= Ministry of Internal Affairs (Transnistria) =

Ministry of Internal Affairs of Transnistria
- Министерство внутренних дел Приднестровской Молдавской Республики
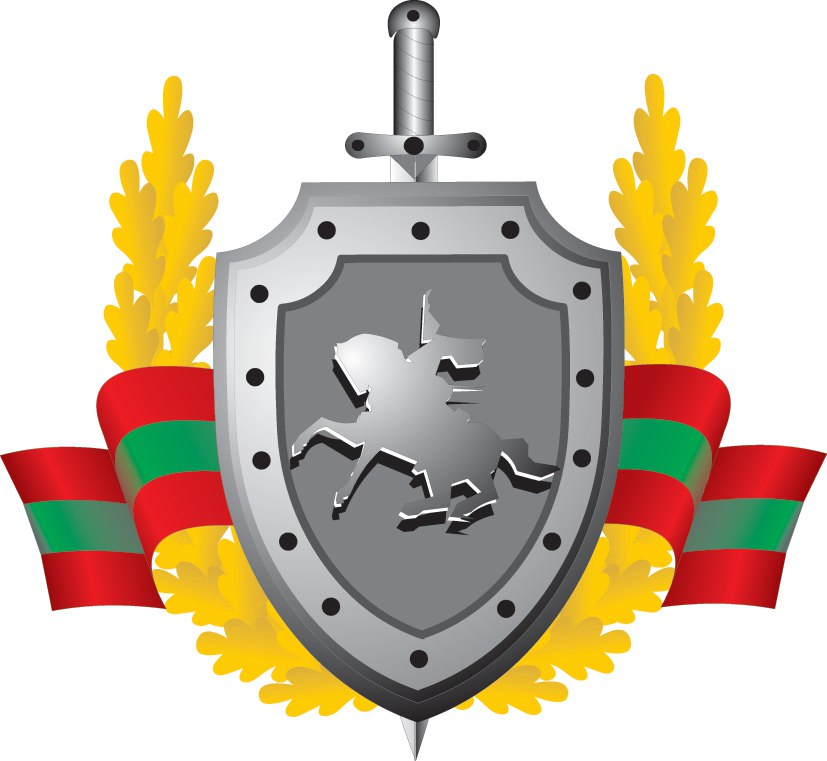
- Formation: 5 March 1991; 35 years ago
- Type: police agency
- Headquarters: 68 Manilov Street, Tiraspol
- Location: Transnistria
- Official language: Russian
- Minister of Internal Affairs: Major General Andrey Barabash (acting)
- Website: MVD PMR

The Ministry of Internal Affairs of Transnistria (Russian: Министерство внутренних дел Приднестровской Молдавской Республики, romanized: Ministerstvo vnutrennikh del Pridnestrovskoy Moldovskoy Respubliki) also known as the Ministry of the Interior is an official government agency of the partially recognized Pridnestrovian Moldavian Republic. It is the executive body in implementing defense policies in of the Armed Forces of Transnistria. It is the successor to the Soviet Department of Internal Affairs Pridnestrovian Moldavian Soviet Socialist Republic (PMSSR). Since 28 January 2026 Major General Andrey Barabash is the acting Minister of Internal Affairs.

== History of the ministry ==
On March 5, 1991, the Government of the PMSSR approved the creation of a Department of Internal Affairs of the PMSSR. Between September and December 1991, Transnistrian cities began to establish local police departments that are affiliated to the national agency. By decree of the Supreme Council of the newly formed Pridnestrovian Moldavian Republic on September 8, 1992, a new structure of the state administration bodies was approved, including the renaming of the Department of Internal Affairs to the Ministry of Internal Affairs of the PMR. Initially, the ministry's headquarters staff was only made up of 18 units.

== Structure ==
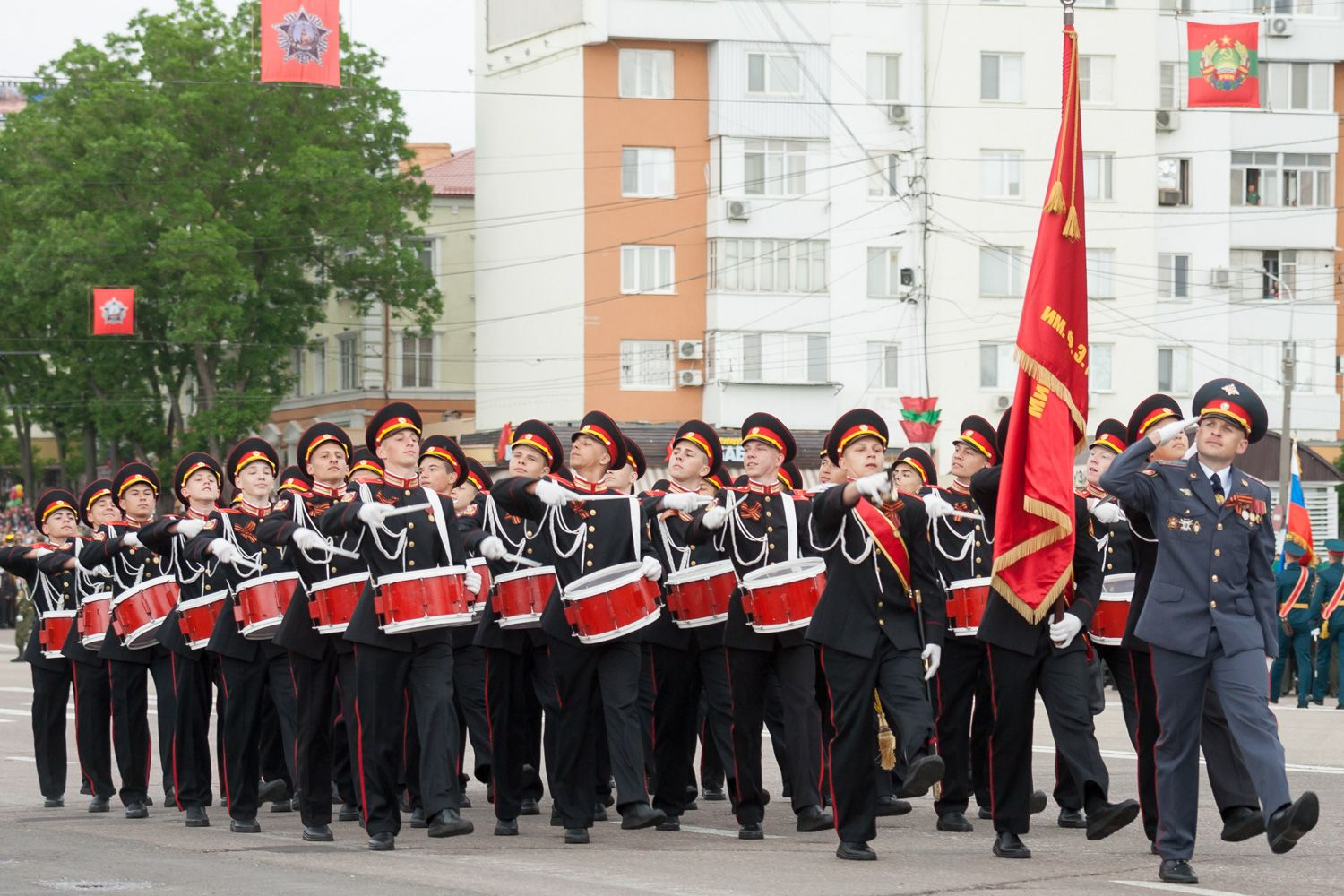
The corps of drums of the Republican Cadet Corps.

The ministry is divided into the following general parts:

- Criminal Police – The main task of which is the suppression and disclosure of crimes, as well as the search for hiding or missing persons;
- Public Security Police – Provides public order protection, personal and public safety, preventive measures for the prevention and suppression of crimes, as well as administrative offenses, the disclosure of crimes and includes a unit of district police inspectors, patrol - guards, road patrol services, inspections for juvenile affairs and administrative units.
- Special Police – Consisting of the state service of private security, the traffic police, registration and examination units and special educational institutions;

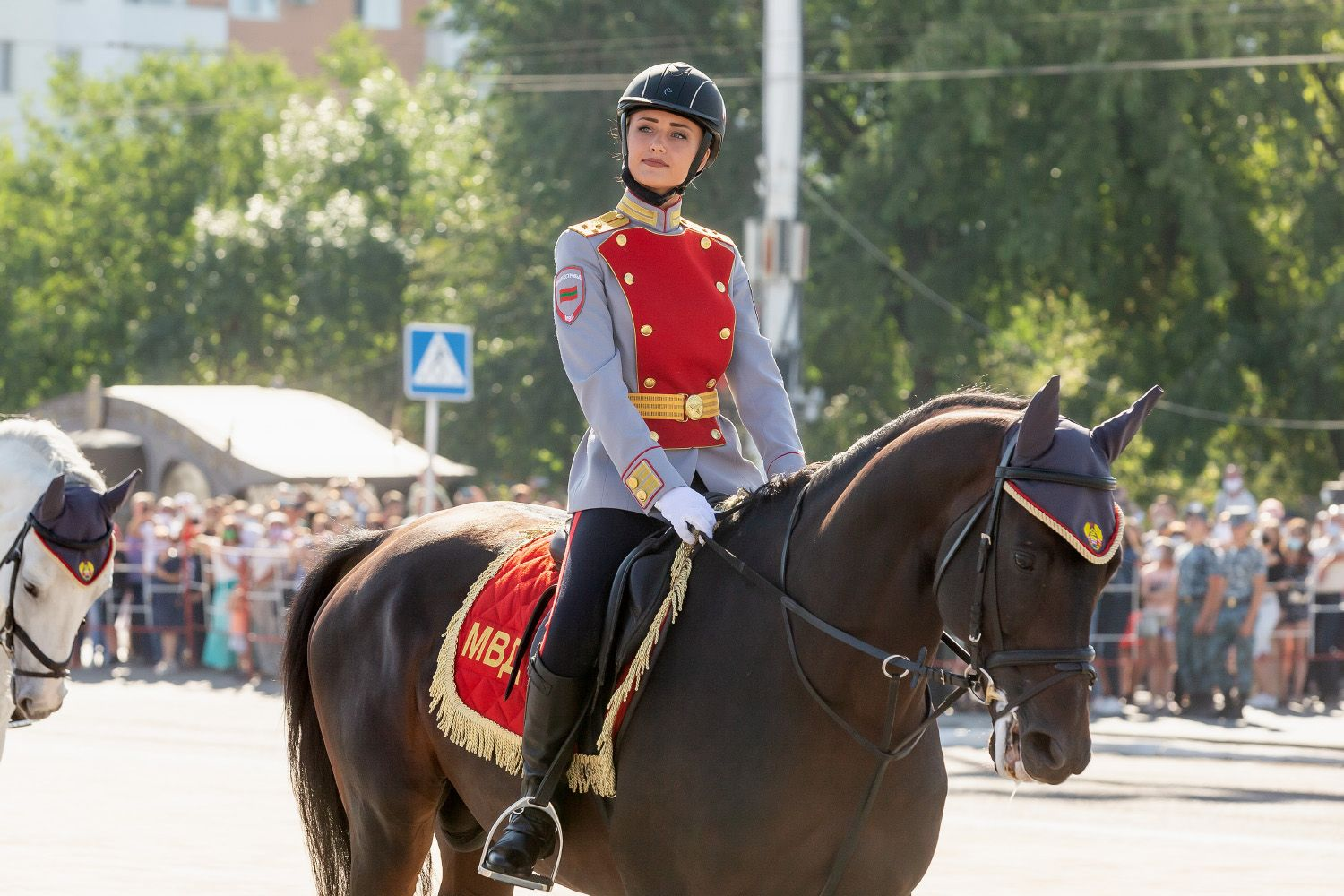
A member of the female cavalry unit of the MVD.

The structure of the Ministry of Internal Affairs is also supplemented by:

- General Directorate for Emergency Situations
  - Staff
    - Analytics Division
  - Press Service
  - Fire Service
  - Civil Defense Department
- Dniester Independent Special Purpose Brigade
- Office for Migration of
- Department of State Automobile Inspection
- Territorial Divisions
- Private Security Forces

== Entities within the MVD ==
=== Educational Institutions ===
- Kutuzov Tiraspol Juridical Institute
- Grigory Potemkin Republican Cadet Corps
- Makarenko Republican Educational Complex

==== Tiraspol Juridical Institute ====
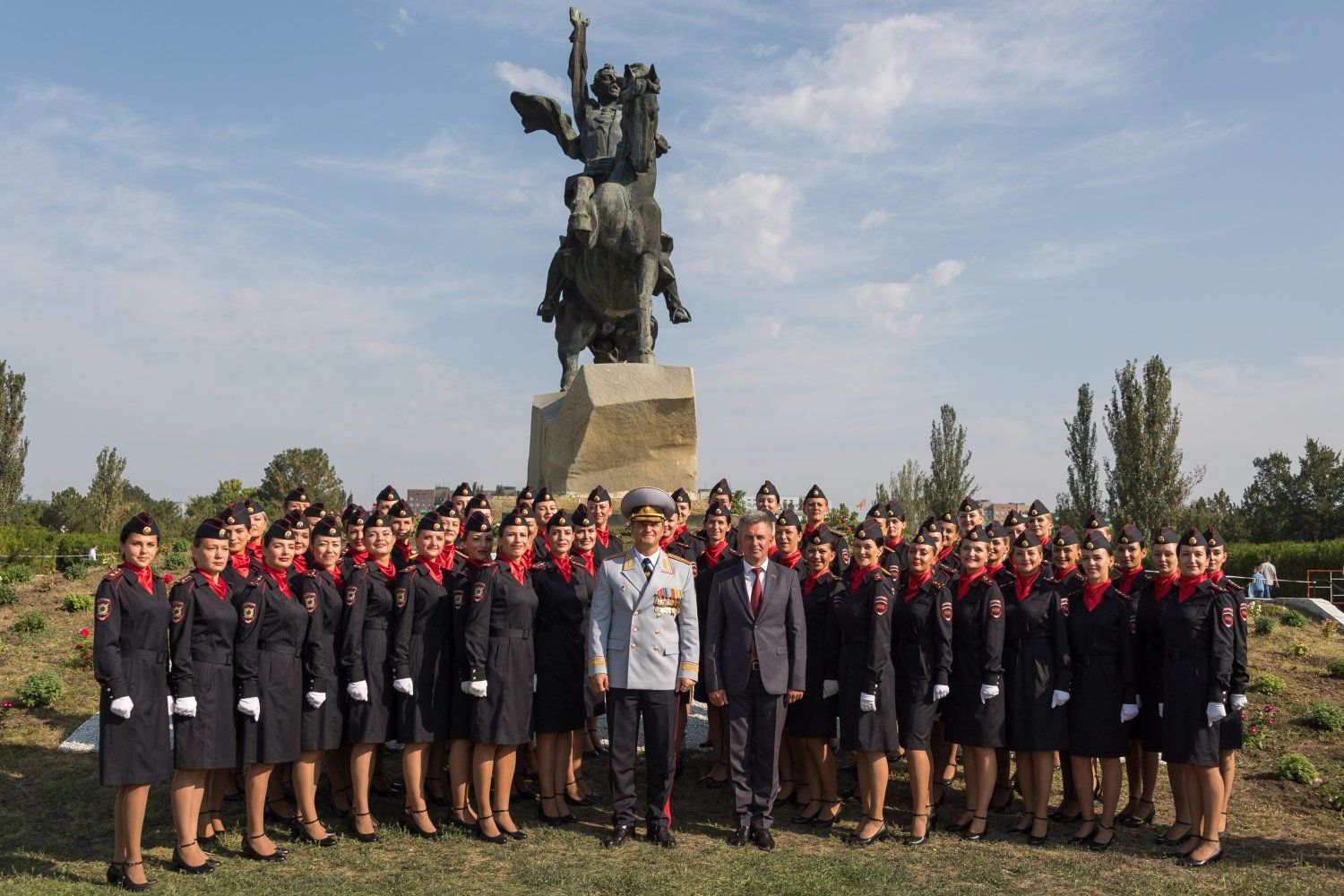
Female cadets of the institute with President Vadim Krasnoselsky on Republic Day.

The Tiraspol Juridical Institute, also known as the Tiraspol Law College, is the higher educational institution of the MVD, akin from the Lebed Military Institute. In the early 90s, with the collapse of the USSR, specialized educational institutions for training personnel for law enforcement agencies became part of the educational system of the newly formed republic. It was founded on 1 March 1993, with the prehistory dating back to December 1991, when a training center was organized at the Tiraspol Municipal Department of Internal Affairs. In May 2009, it was named after Imperial Russian Field marshal Mikhail Kutuzov The institute has the following structure:

- Educational Department
- Service and combat training units
- Logistics Department
- Special library
- Shared library
- Editorial-publishing department
- Chancellery
- Press Service
- Human Resources Department
- Financial and Economic Department
- Security Mode Service

==== Grigory Potemkin Republican Cadet Corps ====
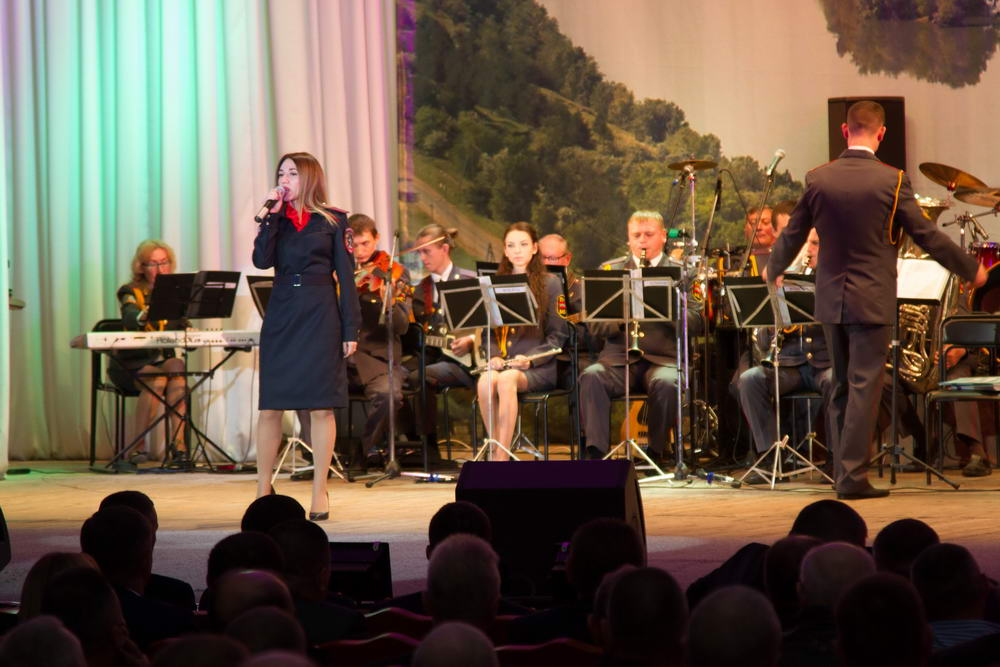
The band performing in October 2018.

The Grigory Potemkin Republican Cadet Corps is a specialized institution for the preparation of minors for professional service in all internal affairs bodies. On 9 July 2002, by a joint order of the Ministry of Education and the Ministry of Internal Affairs, on the basis of the former Railway Boarding School, a Republican boarding school with a sports profile and a cadet department was established in Bender, being named after Bolshevik revolutionary Felix Dzerzhinsky. The first 33 pupils were enrolled in the institution on 23 July. During the entire month of August, cadets were enrolled in the Tiraspol Law College for summer training camps. In September 2002, the cadets began their studies at the school. On 2 September 2003, cadets of the corps opened the military parade of the troops of the Tiraspol Garrison on Republic Day. On 21 February 2004, cadets took part in a military sports festival dedicated to Defender of the Fatherland Day. On 12 April 2004, they also took part in a concert dedicated to the 6th anniversary of the liberation of Tiraspol from the Moldovan National Army.

In early 2015, it was renamed to the Republican Suvorov Military School named after Marshal of the Soviet Union Georgy Zhukov. Two years later, in the fall of 2017, it was given its current name, honoring Prince Grigory Potemkin, an Imperial Russian military leader who died in what is now Moldova during negotiations over the Treaty of Jassy. Since its foundation, over 300 people have become school graduates of the school.

=== MVD Museum ===
On the eve of the 90th anniversary of the Soviet police and the 16th anniversary of the formation of the Transnistrian police, on 9 November 2007, the Central Museum of the Ministry of Internal Affairs was opened at the Tiraspol Law Institute. More than 4 thousand different exhibits are located in five halls located in the building. A collection of firearms was donated to the museum by President Igor Smirnov. Among the 15 exhibits are cars and motorcycles of the State Traffic Inspectorate and some of the first vehicles of fire brigades of the Tsarist Russian Empire. In 2009, the museum was visited by Grand Duchess Maria Vladimirovna of Russia (a claimant to the headship of the imperial family of Russia), who was visiting on a state visit at the invitation of the leadership of the republic.

=== MVD Band ===
The Band of the Ministry of Internal Affairs of Transnistria (Russian: Oркестр Министерства Внутренних Дел Приднестро́вье), also known as the MVD Band (Russian: Oркестр МВД) is the musical ensemble of the Transnistria Ministry of Internal Affairs. Founded in June 1993, the band performs at various official community events. Since its establishment, the band has been headed by Lieutenant Colonel Valentin Memey.

== List of ministers ==
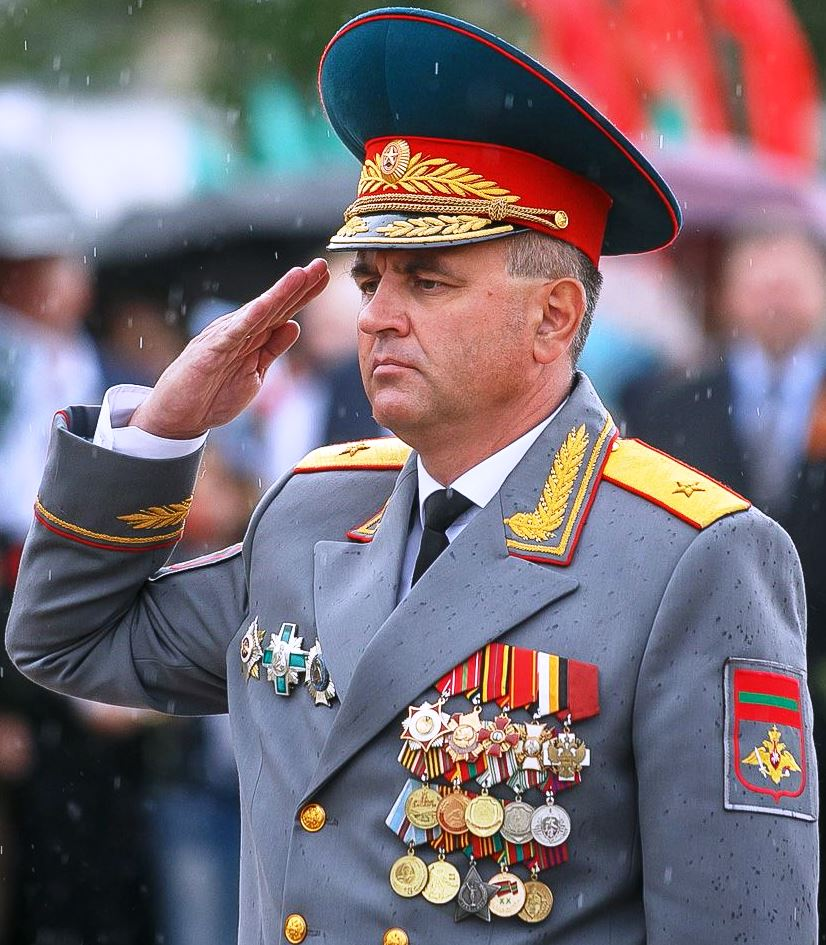
Transnistrian President Vadim Krasnoselsky, who was minister of internal affairs from 2006 to 2012, during a parade in 2018.

The following is a list of ministers of internal affairs of Transnistria from 1991–Present:

- Major General Yuri Grosul (May 6, 1991 – July 1992)
- Lieutenant General Yuri Ovsyannikov (July 1992 – April 1994)
- Colonel Ivan Fuchedzi (April 1994 – February 1997)
- Major General Sergei Petrov (February 1997 – July 1998)
- Colonel Vladimir Kurisko (July 1998 – February 2002)
- Major General Alexander Korolev (February 2002 – December 2006)
- Major General Vadim Krasnoselsky (December 2006 – February 2012)
- Major General Sergei Monul (February 2012 – November 2013)
- Major General Gennady Kuzmichev (November 2013 – December 2015)
- Major General Stanislav Romanyuk (December 2015 – December 2016)
- Lieutenant General Ruslan Mova (December 2016 – 8 July 2021)
- Lieutenant General Vitaly Nyagu (9 July 2021 – 27 January 2026)

== See also ==
- Law enforcement in Transnistria
- Crime in Transnistria
- Ministry of Defence (Transnistria)
  - Armed Forces of Transnistria
  - Operational Group of Russian Forces
  - Joint Control Commission
- Ministry of State Security (Transnistria)
