= Ministry of State Security (Transnistria) =

Transnistrian state security service

- Ministerul Securității Statului; Министерство государственной безопасности
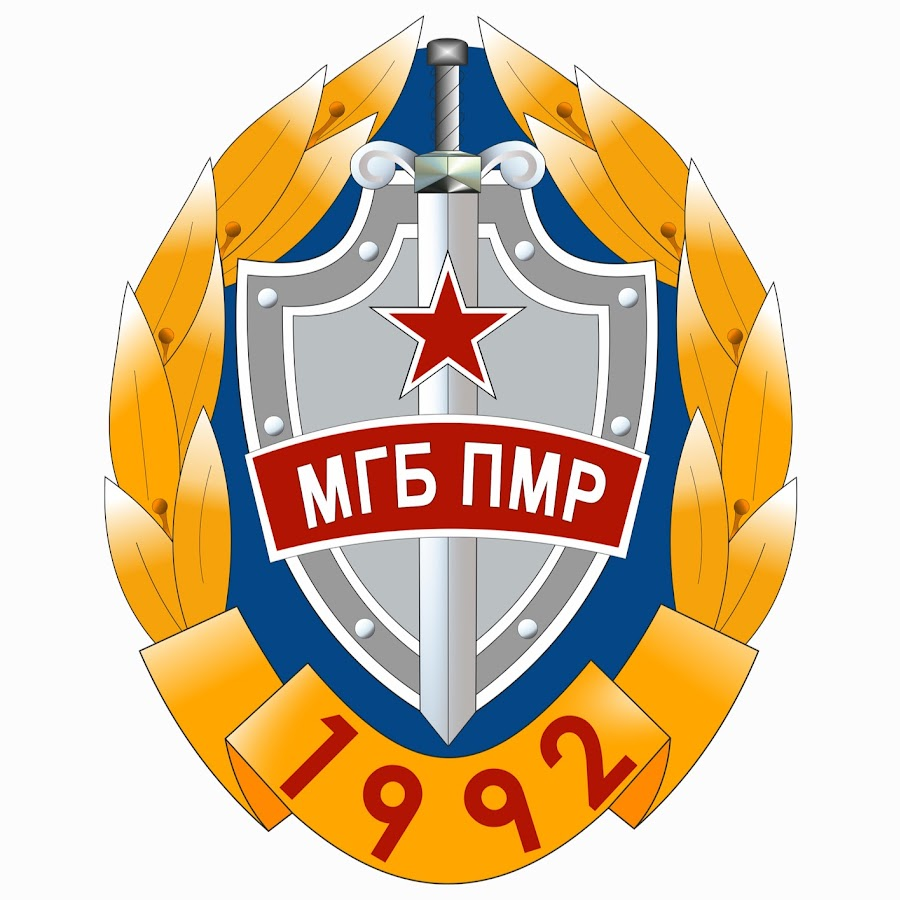

Agency overview
- Formed: 16 May 1992
- Preceding agency: KGB PMR
- Headquarters: Tiraspol

The Ministry of State Security (Romanian: Ministerul Securității Statului; Russian: Министерство государственной безопасности, MGB; Ukrainian: Міністерство державної безпеки) is the secret police agency of the breakaway region of Transnistria.

== History ==
The agency was formed 16 May 1992 and was headed by Vladimir Antyufeyev up to 2012, until he was replaced by Vladislav Finagin. The MGB is headquartered in Tiraspol. Until 11 January 2017, it was known as the Committee of State Security of the Pridnestrovian Moldavian Republic (KGB PMR), which was named after the former Soviet KGB.

The headquarters of the MGB were attacked in 2022 while the Russian invasion of Ukraine was taking place. This was part of a series of attacks of unknown authorship that occurred in Transnistria in that year. The perpetrator is unknown, but it is possible that it was a false flag incident orchestrated by Russia or Transnistria.

== Structure ==
- Territorial security agencies
- Security forces of the Armed Forces of Transnistria
- Service bodies within the ministry
- Support units
- Independent Battalion of Special Operations "Delta"
- Border Detachment
  - Separate Reserve Cossack Border Regiment
- Center for Special Operations

=== Border Detachment ===
The Border Detachment of the MGB tasked with patrolling the regional borders with Moldova and Ukraine. On 14 November 1992, former territorial rescue detachment fighters took the role of protecting of the borders of the republic, along with the Black Sea Cossacks. On 1 March 1993, in the structure of the Ministry of State Security, a reserve cossack regiment was created. The border detachment was formed in September 1993 from the Black Sea Cossacks and soldiers of the TSO. On 14 September 1993, the Border Guard received a battle banner. Today, there are two Cossack border commandant's offices, units of which more than 75% of the personnel are Cossacks.

The border outpost in Bender is named after the Cossack Colonel Driglov, who died defending the during the Transnistria War. Border Guards Day is celebrated on 14 September.

=== Independent Battalion of Special Operations "Delta" ===
The Order of Honor Independent Battalion of Special Operations "Delta" of the Ministry of State Security is a special battalion formed on 31 March 1992 by presidential decree of Igor Smirnov, at the height of the Transnistria War. It is currently subordinate directly to the MGB, and is enlisted in the reserve of the Commander-in-Chief of the Armed Forces, it currently performs tasks of protecting the national border and fight against terrorism.

In late June of that year, the Delta battalion took part in the battle of Bender, driving the forces of the Moldovan National Army from the bridge over the Dnister River. On 4 April 1997, the Delta Battalion was awarded the Order of Honor by President Yevgeny Shevchuk. In 2012, the Delta Battalion was reorganized into the "East" Special Operations Center of the KGB.

== List of leaders ==
- Vladimir Antyufeyev – September 1992 – December 2011
- Vladislav Finagin – January 24, 2012 – May 17, 2013
- Nikolay Zemstov – October 22, 2013 – May 21, 2014
- Mikhail Lapitsky – May 21, 2014 – June 1, 2017
- Valeriy Gebos - June 1, 2017 – present

== See also ==
- KGB
- State Security Committee of the Republic of Belarus
- Ministry of Internal Affairs (Transnistria)
  - Law enforcement in Transnistria
  - Crime in Transnistria
- Ministry of Defence (Transnistria)
  - Armed Forces of Transnistria
  - Operational Group of Russian Forces
  - Joint Control Commission
