= Law enforcement in Transnistria =

Law enforcement in the unrecognized state of Transnistria

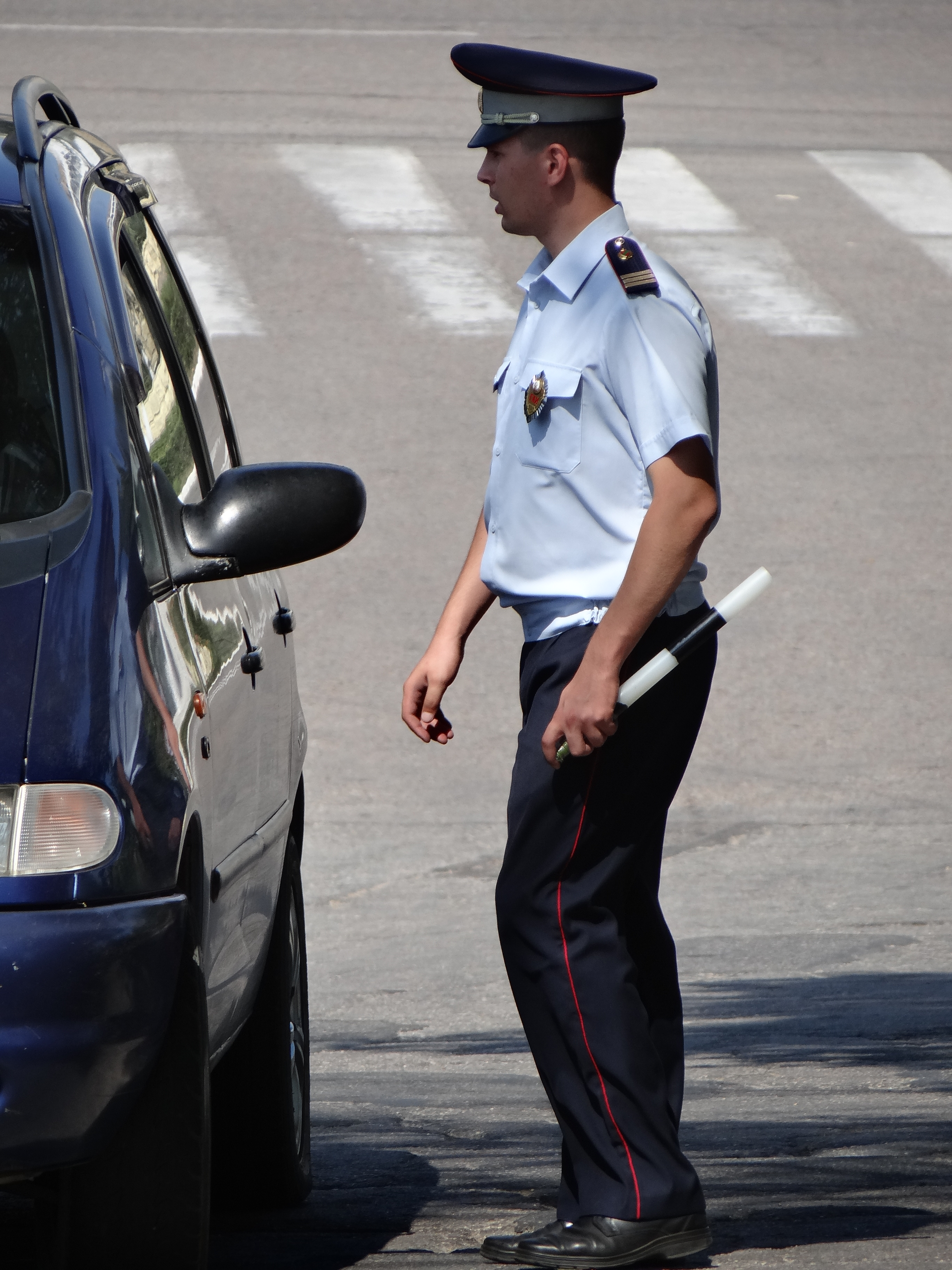
A Transnistrian policeman in Tiraspol.

Law enforcement in Transnistria is administered by the region's own police force (PMR militsiya). Transnistria functions as a presidential republic, with its own government, parliament, military, paramilitary and police (militsiya) force, constitution, currency, postal system and stamps, flag, national anthem, and coat of arms.

International recognition of its sovereignty is limited to Abkhazia and South Ossetia (themselves both only partially recognised as sovereign nations) however, and due to the disputed status of Transnistria, it is subject to the security agencies and concerns of other nations, and both Russian and Transnistrian police officers work side by side patrolling the de facto border between Transnistria and Moldova. The PMR Ministry of Internal Affairs (MVD) is the main governmental body of the law enforcement. Paramilitary security forces such as the Internal Troops reinforce the Militsiya, and act as riot police during internal conflict.

== Russian influence ==
A 2,500-strong Operational Group of Russian Forces, as well as over 20,000 tons of Soviet-era weapons and munition (in the Cobasna ammunition depot) are present in Transnistria. Moldova and the Organization for Security and Co-operation in Europe (OSCE) demand their withdrawal. According to a verdict issued by European Court of Human Rights, the presence of these troops is illegal (breaking the 21 July 1992 Transnistria War ceasefire agreement), and Transnistria is "under the effective authority or at least decisive influence of Russia".

While Russian troops from Moldova proper and from the security zone were evacuated to Russia by January 1993, Russia continued to have a significant military presence in Transnistria. On 21 October 1994, Russia and Moldova signed an agreement that committed Russia to withdrawal of the troops in three years, which however did not come into effect because only Moldova ratified it. Moldovan diplomacy took advantage of the negotiations concerning The Adaptation of the Treaty on Conventional Armed Forces in Europe (CAF), and managed to ensure that a special paragraph about the removal of Russian troops from Moldova's territory was introduced into the text of the OSCE Summit Declaration of Istanbul (1999), through which Russia had committed itself to pulling out its troops from Transnistria by the end of 2002.

However, even after 2002, Russia continued to ignore the agreements made with the government in Chisinau and with the international community regarding the removal of its troops from Moldova. President Vladimir Putin eventually signed the Law on the ratification of the Treaty on CAF in Europe on 19 July 2004, which were committing Russia to remove from Moldova the heavy armaments limited by this Treaty by the end of 2001.

During 2000–2001, to comply to the CAF Treaty, Moscow withdrew 125 pieces of Treaty Limited Equipment (TLE) and 60 railway wagons containing ammunition from the Transnistrian region of Moldova. In 2002, Russia withdrew only 3 military equipment trains (118 railway wagons) and 2 of ammunition (43 wagons) from the Transnistrian region of Moldova, and in 2003, 11 rail convoys transporting military equipment and 31 transporting ammunitions. According to the OSCE Mission to Moldova, of a total of 42,000 tons of ammunitions stored in Transnistria, 1,153 tons (3%) was transported back to Russia in 2001, 2,405 tons (6%) in 2002 and 16,573 tons (39%) in 2003. Removal of troops has been stalled afterwards.

Andrei Stratan, the Minister of Foreign Affairs of Moldova stated in his speech during the 12th OSCE Ministerial Council Meeting in Sofia on 6 – 7 December 2004 that "The presence of Russian troops on the territory of the Republic of Moldova is against the political will of Moldovan constitutional authorities and defies the unanimously recognized international norms and principles, being qualified by Moldovan authorities as a foreign military occupation illegally deployed on the territory of the state[…]" Russia continues to 'sustain the Dniestr region as a quasi-independent entity through direct and indirect means'

== School dispute ==
Through the 1990s the Transnistrian police were involved in a conflict over Romanian-language schools in Transnistria. In September 1996, the Grigoriopol administration used Cossacks and police to stop the activity of the local Romanian-language school. On 2 October 1996 three teachers were arrested and taken to Tiraspol. On 7 October 1996, as a result of a demarche by the President of the Republic of Moldova and the OSCE Mission, the teachers were released. In 2004, the Transnistrian authorities closed four of the six schools in the region that taught Moldovan language using the Latin script, known as Romanian. Some of the 3,400 enrolled children were affected by this measure and the teachers and parents who opposed the closures were temporarily arrested for up to six hours.

An OSCE report from June 2005 states: "If they [Moldovan parents in Transnistria] enroll their children in one of this schools that offer a Moldovan curriculum using a Latin script, they risk being threatened by the regional security service, and seeing their jobs put in jeopardy. Sending their children in one of the 33 Transdniestrian schools they teach in their native language in Cyrillic is, however, hardly an appealing alternative, as the schools follow an out-dated curriculum and use textbooks from the Soviet period".

In November 2006, Luis O'Neill, head of OSCE mission to Moldova, has urged local authorities in the Transnistrian city of Rîbnița to return a confiscated building to the Moldovan Latin-script school located in the city. The building was built by the Government from Chișinău and was almost finished in 2004, when Transnistrian police took it by force, during the school crisis.

== See also ==
- Ministry of Internal Affairs (Transnistria)
  - Crime in Transnistria
- Ministry of Defence (Transnistria)
  - Armed Forces of Transnistria
  - Operational Group of Russian Forces
  - Joint Control Commission
- Ministry of State Security (Transnistria)
