= Public holidays in Transnistria =

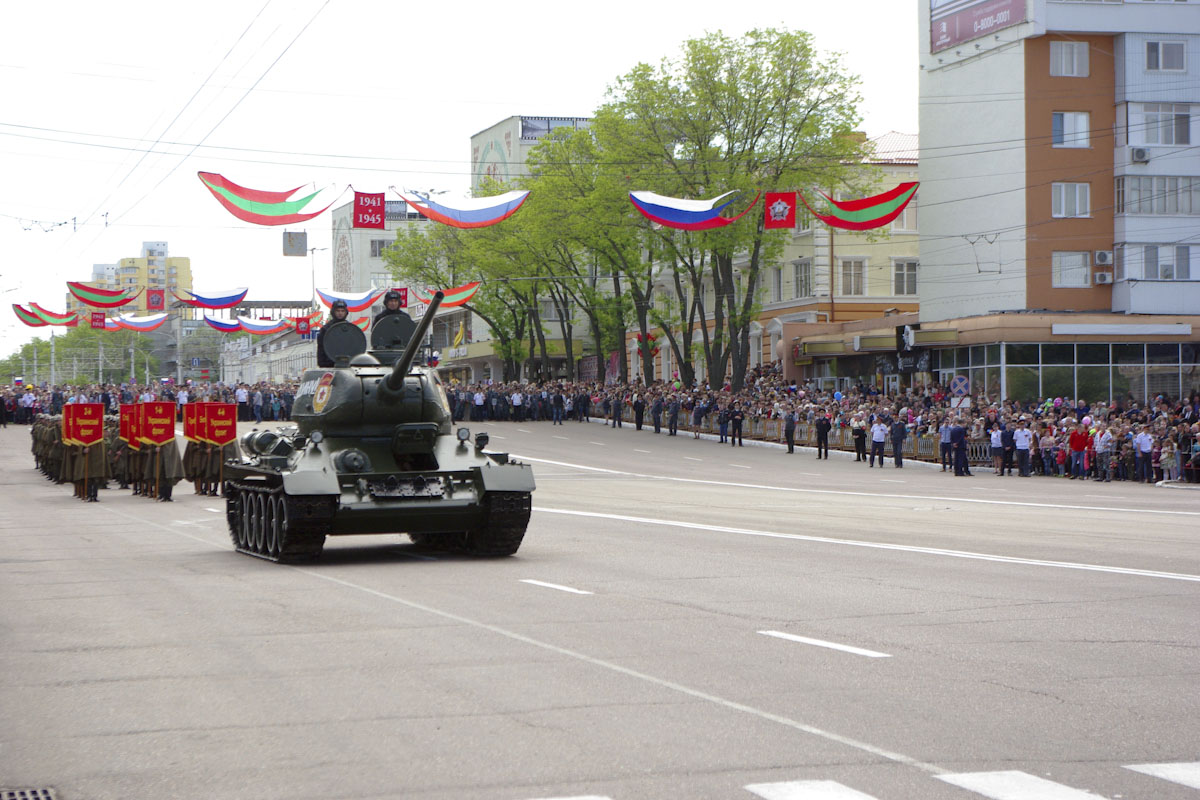
Victory Day celebrations in Tiraspol, 2017.

Public holidays in Transnistria lists the official public holidays recognized by the breakaway Transnistrian government. On these days, government offices, offices of foreign missions (such as the Organization for Security and Co-operation in Europe) and some shops, are closed. If the date of observance falls on a Saturday or Sunday, the following Monday will be a day off in lieu of the holiday.

== Official holidays ==
Date	English name	Russian name	Remarks
1-2 January	New Year's Day	Новый Год	
7 January	Orthodox Christmas	Рождество	
23 February	Defender of the Fatherland Day	День защитника отечества	
8 March	International Women's Day	Восьмое марта	
1-2 May	Labour Day	День международной солидарности трудящихся	It is celebrated over the course of two days.
9 May	Victory Day	День Победы	Denotes the victory against Germany in World War II
2 September	Independence Day	День независимости	
31 December	New Year's Eve	Новый Год	
Movable	Orthodox Easter	Пасха	
9 days after Orthodox Easter	Commemoration Day		

== Professional holidays ==
Date	English name	Russian name	Remarks
10 February	Day of the Diplomatic Service		
12 April	Liberation Day		
17 April	Firefighter Day		
28 April	Labor Protection Day		
16 May	State Security Day		
18 May	Museum Day		
28 July	Peacekeeper Day		
19 August	Civil Protection Day		
6 September	Armed Forces Day		
14 September	Border Guards Day		
17 September	Day of the 2006 Transnistrian independence referendum		
7 November	October Revolution Day		
10 November	Police Day		
24 December	Constitution Day		Adopted in 1996

== See also ==
- Public holidays in Moldova
- Public holidays in Romania
- Public holidays in Russia
