= Memey =

Memey is a given name and surname. Notable persons and characters with the name include:

- Cut Memey (born 1980), Indonesian model, actress and television host
- Memey Suhaiza (born 1988), Malaysian actress, model, presenter and businesswoman
- Valentin Memey, former director of the Military Band of the General Staff of the Armed Forces of Transnistria

== Fictional characters ==
- In Tribu
- In Kung Fu Pocong Perawan
