= Joint Commission (disambiguation) =

Joint Commission is a U.S. health care accreditation association.

It may also refer to:

- International Joint Commission of the United States and Canada
- Joint Commission International, group that provides international health care accreditation services to hospitals

== See also ==
- Joint Control Commission of Russia, Moldova and Transnistria
