= Armed Forces of Transnistria =

Military forces of the state of Transnistria

Armed Forces of the Pridnestrovian Moldavian Republic
- Вооружённые силы Приднестровской Молдавской Республики
- Insignia of the Armed Forces
- Founded: 6 September 1991; 35 years ago
- Headquarters: Tiraspol

Leadership
- Commander-in-chief: Vadim Krasnoselsky
- Minister of Defence: Lieutenant General Oleg Obruchkov
- Chief of the General Staff: Major General Pavel Mikhailov

Personnel
- Military age: 18
- Active personnel: 5,000 (2018)
- Reserve personnel: 16,000 (2018)

Industry
- Domestic suppliers: Transnistria
- Foreign suppliers: Russia; Abkhazia; South Ossetia; Soviet Union (former)

Related articles
- History: Transnistria War

The Armed Forces of the Pridnestrovian Moldavian Republic (Note: Romanian: Forțele armate ale Republicii Moldovenești Nistrene, Moldovan Cyrillic: Форцеле армате але Републичий Молдовенешть Нистрене; Russian: Вооружённые силы Приднестровской Молдавской Республики, romanized: Vooruzhyonnye sily Pridnestrovskoy Moldavskoy Respubliki; Ukrainian: Збройні сили Придністровської Молдавської Республіки, romanized: Zbroini syly Prydnistrovs'koi Moldavs'koi Respubliky) are the military forces of Transnistria, a self-proclaimed and internationally unrecognized breakaway state located within the internationally recognized borders of Moldova. The Armed Forces operate under the authority of the Ministry of Defence. The Armed Forces were established on 6 September 1991, with the stated purpose of maintaining the region's claimed sovereignty and independence, in accordance with Article 11 of the region's constitution.

== History ==
On 6 September 1991, the Supreme Soviet of Transnistria adopted a resolution which called for the formation of a Transnistrian military unit. As a result, the Transnistria Republican Guard (Russian: Республиканская гвардия ПМР) was formed. It was the direct counterpart to the Republic of Moldova's Republican Guard (Romanian: Garda Republicană). Both were the predecessors to their respective countries armed forces. In its first major conflict, the guard repelled Moldovan troops from the city Dubăsari in December 1991. By the end of 1991, the organizational formation of the Transnistrian armed forces was generally completed. Shortly after the outbreak of Transnistrian War in March 1992, the People's Militia was created, having been supported and armed by the Russian Armed Forces 14th Guards Army. By the end of 1992, all main structures of the Ministry of Defence and the General Staff were formed, including individual military units, government agencies, and specialized services. On 14 March 1993, personnel of the new armed forces took the military oath of allegiance to the country.

As of 2021, Transnistria is equipped mainly with Soviet-Era equipment including the T-64BV tank. Infantry fighting vehicles are the BMP-1 and BMP-2 with at least 15 in service as of 2021. APCs include the BTR family of APCs as well as over 70 MT-LBs, GT-MU, and BTRG-127 vehicles. Trucks are typically post-Soviet, Ural-375, GAZ-66, and Zil-131 trucks make up the logistics backbone. Rocket artillery is very important for the Armed Forces, given the limited number of conventional artillery Transnistria has. Rocket launchers include the Grad system, some of which were placed on ZIL-131 trucks. Transnistria also has a domestic rocket launcher industry which has built the Pribor-1 and Pribor-2 rocket launchers with 20 tubes and 48 tubes respectively; both systems are of 122mm caliber. Transnistria does have a small domestic drone industry which has been producing reconnaissance drones for the military since at least 2019. These have been jointly used with the Pribor-2 rocket launch systems in exercises to increase accuracy of the rockets via drone targeting.

== Structure ==
The armed forces are composed of 4,500 to 5,500 active duty soldiers, (with 15,000 - 20,000 personnel in the reserve).

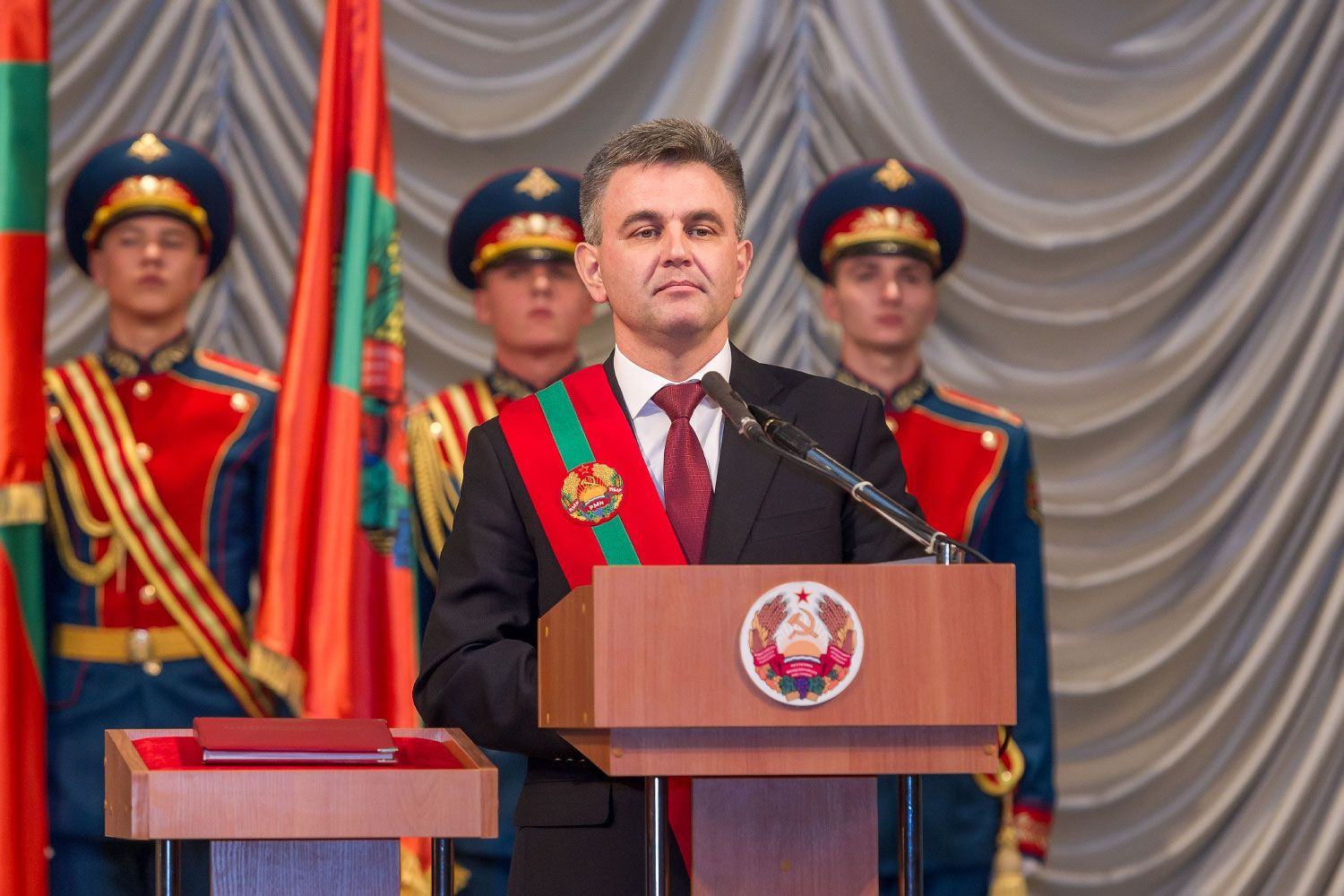
President Vadim Krasnoselsky

In order of precedence, the current military leadership is composed of the following:

- President of Transnistria/Commander-in-Chief – President of Transnistria Vadim Krasnoselsky
- Minister of Defence – Lieutenant General Oleg Obruchkov
- Chief of the General Staff – Major General Pavel Mikhailov

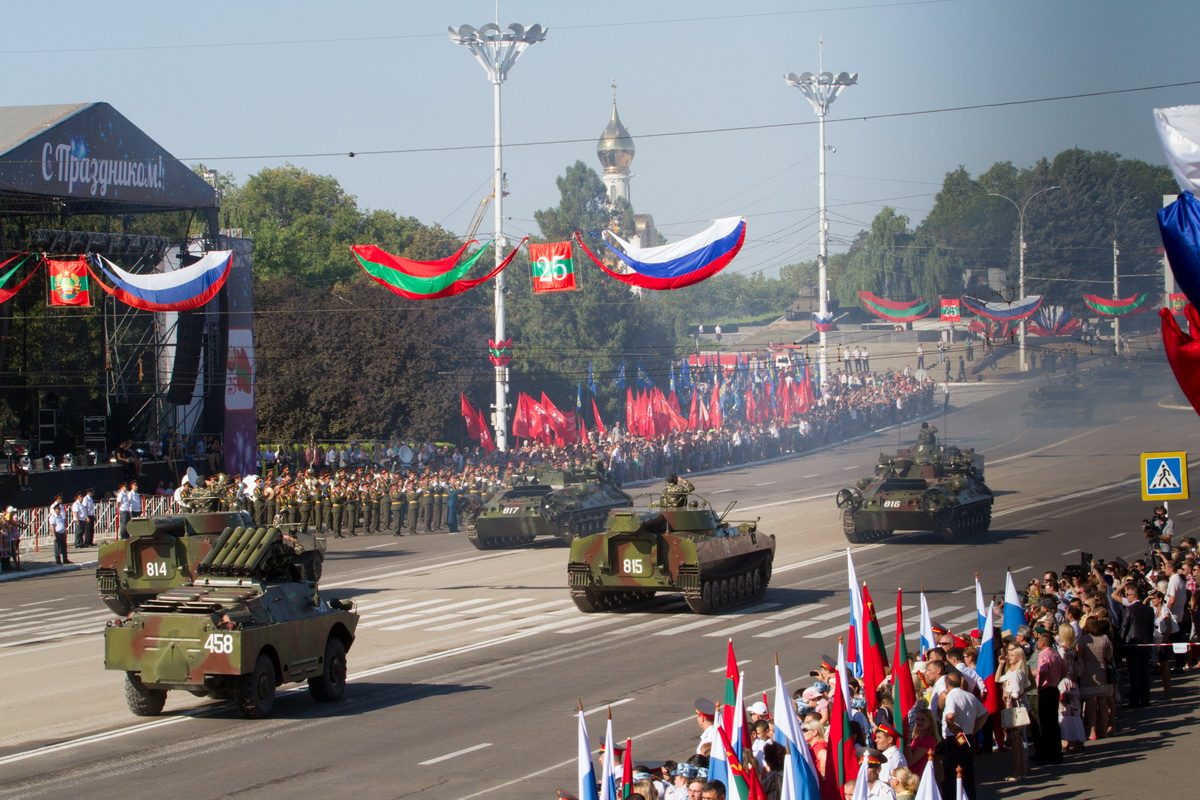
Tiraspol military parade 2015

=== Units ===
==== Regular Army ====
- 1st Guards Motorised Rifle Brigade "Stefan Kitzac" (Tiraspol)
- 2nd Motorised Rifle Brigade (Bender)
- 3rd Motorised Rifle Brigade (Rîbnița)
- 4th Motorised Rifle Brigade (Dubăsari)
- 1st Independent Aviation Detachment
- Tank Battalion
- Artillery Regiment
- Anti-aircraft Regiment
- Special Forces Battalion
- Security Battalion
- Intelligence Company
- Airborne Infantry (VDV)

Additional support is provided by the Operational Group of Russian Forces of the Russian Army, based in the Transnistrian city of Cobasna.

==== Specialized Units ====
- General Staff of the Armed Forces – It is the commanding and managing body of the armed forces. It is tasked with enforcing military strategy which comes from the ministry of defense.
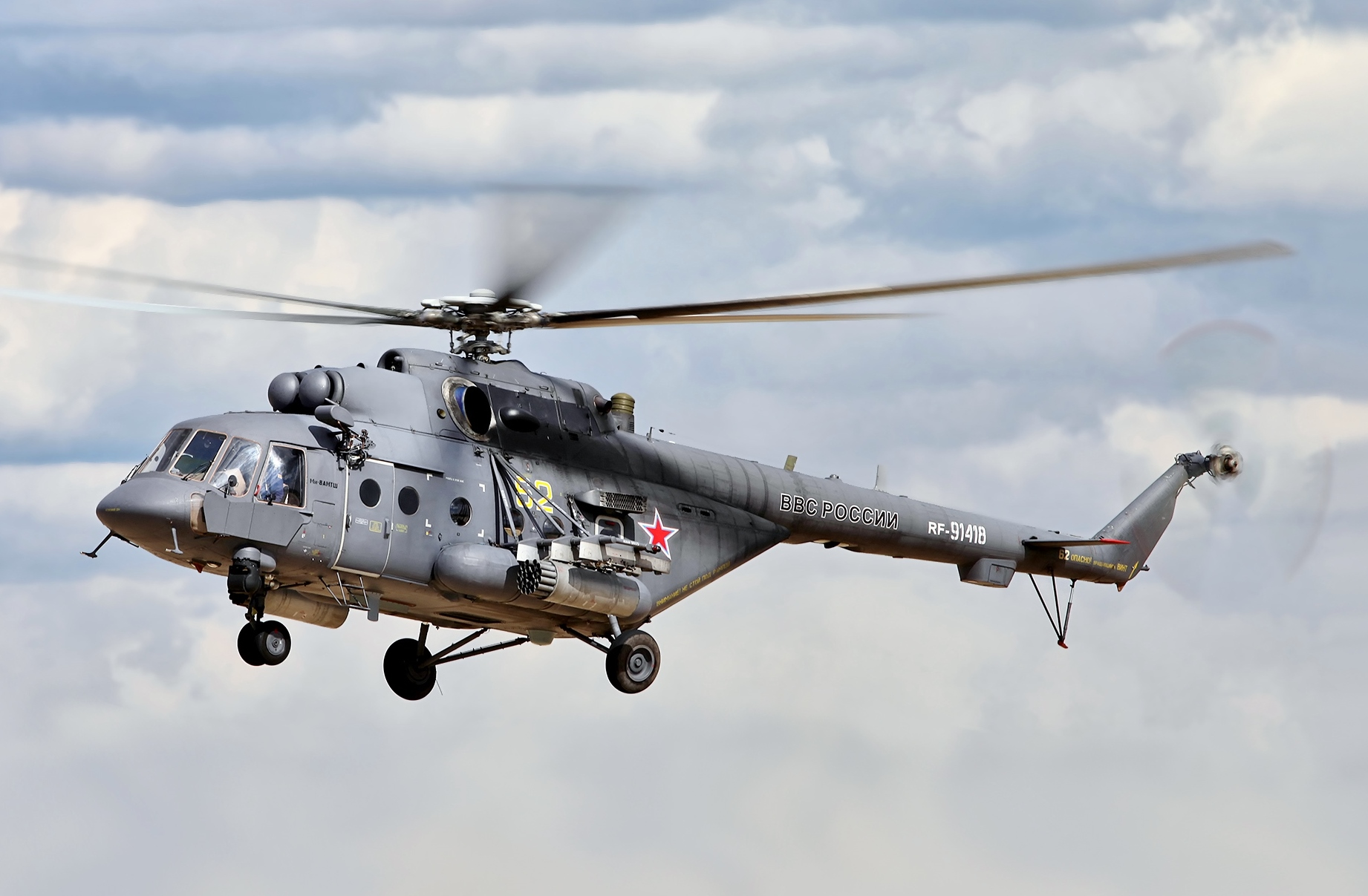
  A Mil Mi-17 similar to this one is used by Transnistria
- PMR Honour Guard – Since its establishment on 6 November 1997, the PMR Honour Guard has taken part in the welcoming of honoured guests and festive and ceremonies. Notable commanders of the unit include Yaroslav Isak, Valentin Rasputin and Artem Chernichenko.
- General Staff Band – The band's musicians must have at least a year of experience in the musical services of the Russian, Moldovan, and Ukrainian armed forces. Their repertoire includes over 500 works by foreign composers. The band is led by Colonel Vitaly Voinov.
- Peacekeeping Force

=== Military education ===
==== Higher education ====
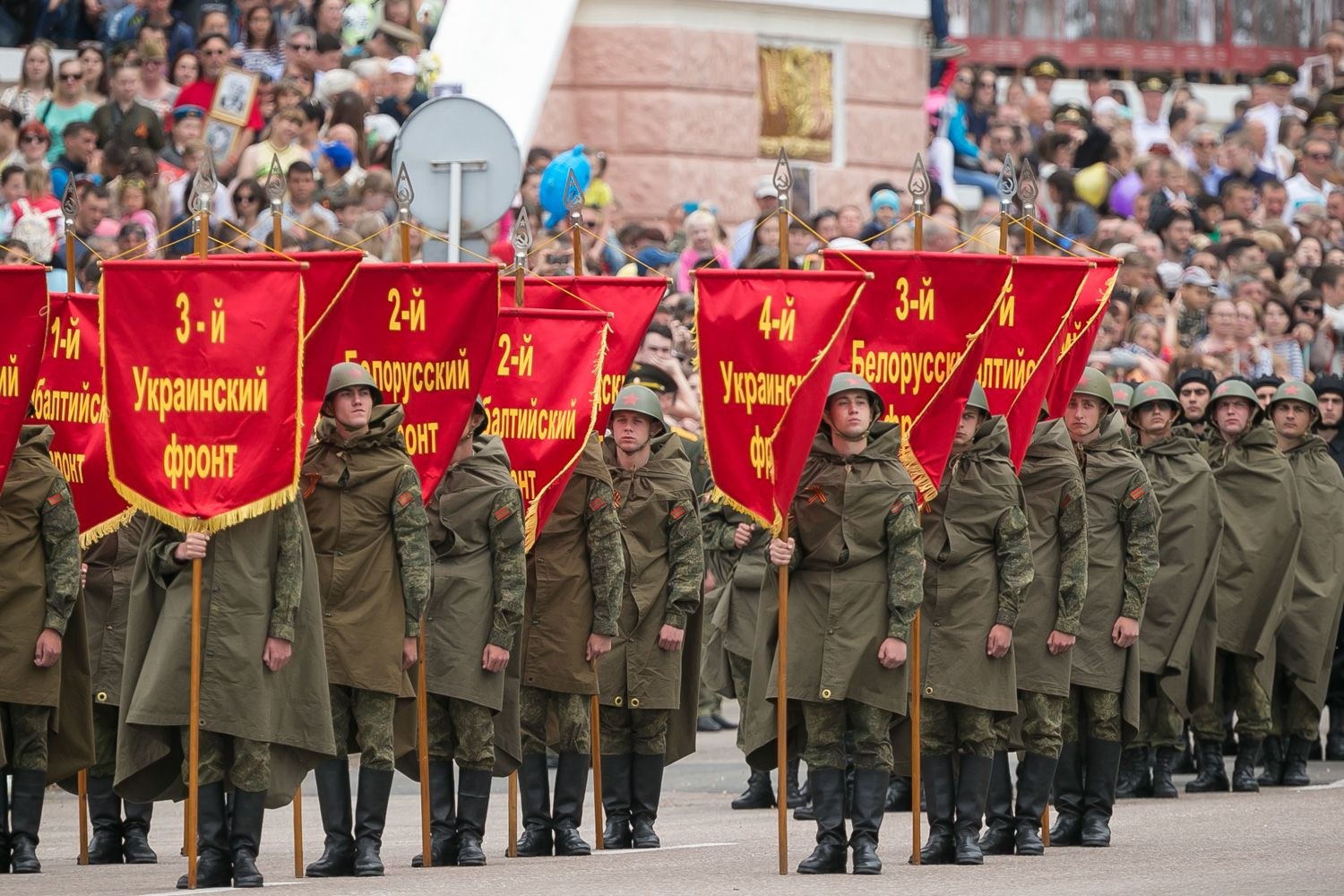
Cadets of the Military Institute of the Ministry of Defense dressed in historical parade uniforms

- Military Institute of the Ministry of Defense – Founded in May 1993, it is the seniormost military institution in the armed forces. It was reorganized as an independent institution from the Shevchenko Transnistria State University on 30 April 2008. In August 2009, the institute was awarded a battle flag and was given the honor of being renamed to honor Alexander Lebed in July 2012.
- Basic training courses for military specialists

==== Cadet schools ====
- Tiraspol Suvorov Military School – It was founded on 1 September 2017 and is based on the Suvorov Military Schools in Russia and Belarus
- Grigory Potemkin Republican Cadet Corps

== Security forces ==
- Ministry of State Security
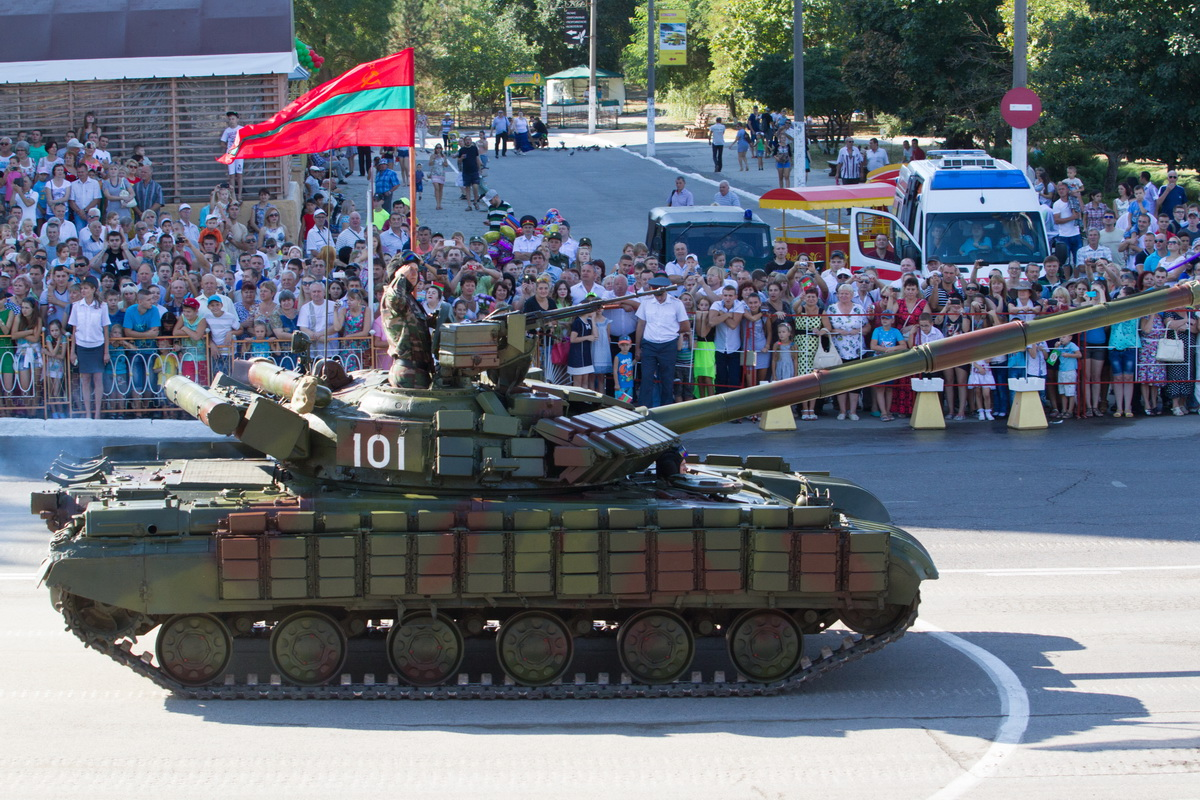
  - A T-64 main battle tank
    PMR Border Guard
  - Independent Battalion of Special Operations "Delta"
- Special Motorized Military Unit of the Ministry of Internal Affairs (formed in 1995)
- Spetsnaz

== Culture ==
=== Events ===
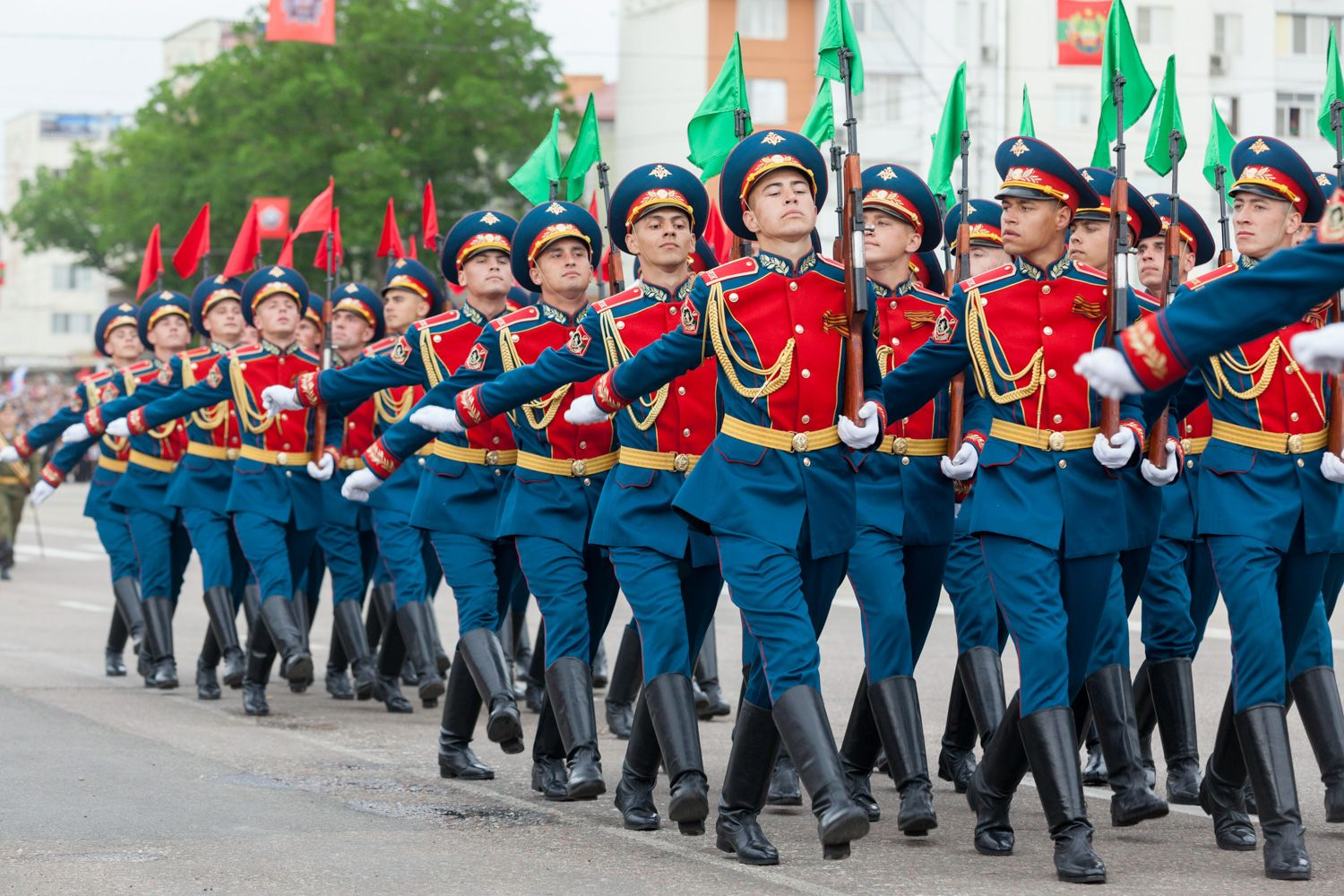
The PMR Honour Guard at the parade.

On Republic Day and Victory Day, two-hour military parades of the Armed Forces of Transnistria is annually held on Suvorov Square, usually featuring over 15 military contingents overseen by the president, the Prime Minister and members of the Supreme Council. A historical mechanized convoy is usually assembled at the parade. In 2020, due to the COVID-19 pandemic, the two jubilee celebrations were merged on 2 September.

The official armed forces holiday is Defender of the Fatherland Day on 23 February, which celebrated similarly to Russia and the Commonwealth of Independent States. Other military holidays include:

- Internal Troops Day (March 24)
- Liberation Day (April 12)
- State Security Day (May 16)
- Peacekeeper Day (July 28)
- Armed Forces Day (September 6)
- Border Guards Day (September 14)

=== Institutions ===
==== Museum ====
The Military History Museum of the Armed Forces was opened on 13 November 1999 by President Smirnov together with Defense Minister Stanislav Hazheev. It has been visited by more than 20,000 servicemen, students, and tourists. The main attraction is the diorama "Storming the bridge over the Dniester", which depicts an episode of the battle on 20 June 1992. The museum is conventionally divided into two parts: exhibits and archival photographs. The central area is occupied by a ring in memory of fallen guardsmen.

==== Sports Club ====
The Army Sports Club in Transnistria is a sports movement in the army that has the involvement of not only active military personnel, but also retired ones, as well as their family members, and pre-conscription youth. Almost anyone who wants to compete under the SKA banner are able to join the club. It was created as part of a return to the traditions of Soviet sports.

== Equipment ==
Military equipment of the Armed Forces of Transnistria
Name	Image	Origin	In service	Notes
Tanks
T-64BV		USSR	18	
Armoured Fighting Vehicles
BRDM-1		USSR	N/A	
BRDM-2		USSR	N/A	
MT-LB		USSR	N/A	
GT-MU		USSR	N/A	
GT-MU With 73mm SPG-9 RCL		USSR; Transnistria	N/A	
Self-Propelled Anti-Tank Missile Systems
9P148 Konkurs		USSR	N/A	
Infantry Fighting Vehicles
BMP-1P		USSR	N/A	(Only a few in possession).
BMP-2 Obr. 1984		USSR	N/A	(Only a few in possession).
Armoured Personnel Carriers
BTR-50		USSR	N/A	
BTR-60PB		USSR	N/A	(Some locally up-armoured examples are also in service).
BTR-70		USSR	N/A	(Some equipped with pintle-mounted ATGMs).
BTR-80		USSR	N/A	
BTRG-127 'Bumblebee'		USSR; Transnistria	N/A	
Infantry Mobility Vehicles
'Transvee'		USSR; Transnistria	N/A	Humvee copy based on the GAZ-66 chassis.
Technicals And Fast Attack Vehicles
Lada Niva		USSR; Transnistria	N/A	
UAZ-469		USSR	N/A	(Armed with ATGMs or SPG-9 RCLs).
Command Posts And Communications Stations
BMP-1KSh Command And Staff Vehicle		USSR	N/A	
R-145BM1 Command Vehicle		USSR	N/A	
BTR-60PU-12M Air Defence Command Vehicle		USSR	N/A	(Some used as driver-trainer vehicles).
R-409 Radio Station		USSR	N/A	
Engineering Vehicles And Equipment
BAT-2 Heavy Engineering Vehicle		USSR	N/A	
IRM 'Zhuk' Engineer Reconnaissance Vehicle		USSR	N/A	
UR-77 'Meteorit' Mine Clearing Vehicle		USSR	N/A	
PTS Tracked Amphibious Transport		USSR	N/A	
PTS-2 Tracked Amphibious Transport		USSR	N/A	
GMZ-3 Minelayer		USSR	N/A	
PMZ-4 Minelayer		USSR	N/A	
PZM-2 Trench Digger		USSR	N/A	
BMK-130M/BMK-150 Towing And Motor Boat		USSR	N/A	
Towed Artillery
85mm D-44 Divisional Gun		USSR	N/A	
100mm MT-12 Anti-Tank Gun		USSR	N/A	
100mm KS-19 AA Gun Used As Howitzer		USSR	N/A	
Multiple Rocket Launchers
122mm 'S1T' or '1ST' ''Pribor-1''		USSR; Transnistria	N/A	
122mm 'S2T' or '2ST' ''Pribor-2''		USSR; Transnistria	N/A	
Towed Anti-Aircraft Guns
14.5mm ZPU-1		USSR	N/A	
14.5mm ZPU-2		USSR	N/A	
14.5mm ZPU-4		USSR	N/A	
23mm ZU-23		USSR	N/A	
57mm AZP S-60		USSR	N/A	
Self-Propelled Anti-Aircraft Guns
MT-LB With Dual 12.7mm NSV Turret		USSR; Transnistria	N/A	
14.5mm ZPU-2 On Ural-4320		USSR; Transnistria	N/A	
23mm ZU-23 On ZiL-131		USSR; Transnistria	N/A	
Radars
P-12 'Spoon Rest A'		USSR	N/A	

=== Aircraft ===
Aircraft	Image	Origin	Type	In service	Notes
Transport
An-2		USSR	Transport	2	
Helicopters
Mil Mi-8		USSR	Utility	1	
Mil Mi-2		USSR	Utility	1	

=== Retired aircraft ===
Previous aircraft operated were the Antonov An-26, Antonov An-2, Yakovlev Yak-52 airplanes, and Mil Mi-2 and Mil Mi-24 helicopters.

== See also ==
- Ministry of Defence (Transnistria)
- Operational Group of Russian Forces
- Joint Control Commission
- Ministry of Internal Affairs (Transnistria)
  - Law enforcement in Transnistria
  - Crime in Transnistria
- Ministry of State Security (Transnistria)
