= Chief of the General Staff (Transnistria) =

Chief of General Staff of the Armed Forces
- Начальники Главного штаба вооружённых сил
- Emblem of the armed forces
- Incumbent; Colonel Sergey Gerasyutenko since 6 September 2016
- Armed Forces of Transnistria
- Reports to: Minister of Defence
- Appointer: The president
- Formation: 22 January 1993
- First holder: Vladimir Evgenievich Prosovetskiy

The chief of the general staff of the Armed Forces of the Pridnestrovskaia Moldavskaia Respublika (Russian: Начальник Главного штаба Вооруженных Сил Приднестровской Молдавской Республики) is the highest-ranking military officer of the Armed Forces of Transnistria. He is responsible for the administration and the operational control of the Transnistria military. The current chief of the general staff is Major General Pavel Mikhailov.

== List of commanders ==
No.	Portrait	Chief of the General Staff	Took office	Left office	Time in office	Ref.
1	Vladimir Prosovetskiy	Major general Vladimir Prosovetskiy	22 January 1993	14 August 1998	5 years, 6 months	-
2	Nikolay Lepikhov [ru]	Major general Nikolay Lepikhov (1947–2006)	August 1998	13 May 2006 †	7 years, 8 months	-
3	Vladimir Atamanyuk [ru]	Major general Vladimir Atamanyuk (born 1943)	10 June 2006	17 January 2012	5 years, 7 months	
4	Valery Orzhekhovsky	Colonel; Valery Orzhekhovsky	17 January 2012	July 2013	1 year, 5 months	
5	Oleg Gomenyuk [ru]	Major general Oleg Gomenyuk (born 1960)	July 2013	30 December 2015	2 years, 5 months	
6	Ruslan Paulesko	Major general Ruslan Paulesko	19 January 2016	18 August 2016	6 months	
7	Sergey Gerasyutenko [ru]	Colonel; Sergey Gerasyutenko (born 1960)	6 September 2016	7 September 2020	4 years	
7	Pavel Mikhailov [ru]	Major General; Pavel Mikhailov (born 1963)	September 2020	Incumbent	6 years	
