= Military Institute of the Ministry of Defense (Transnistria) =

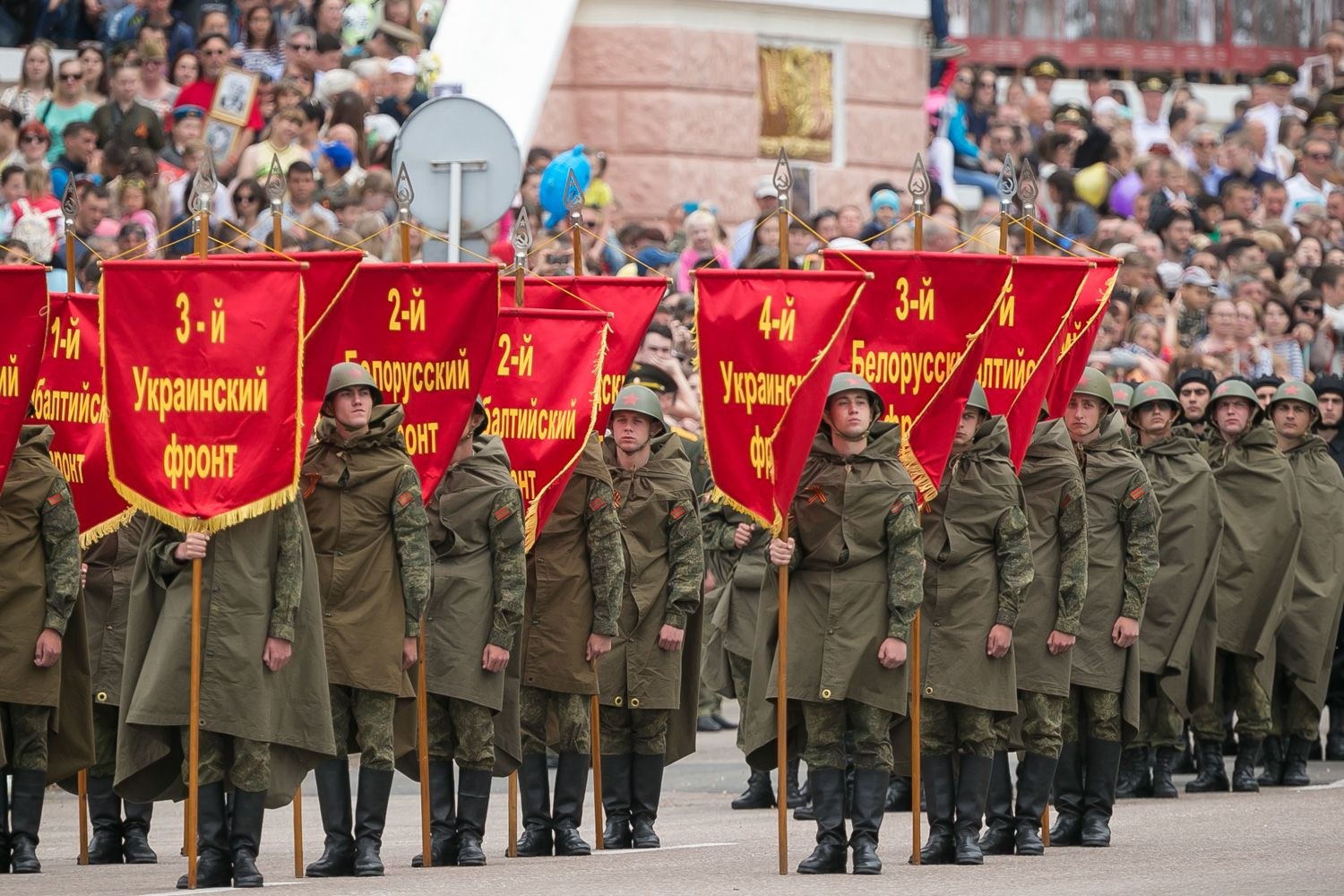
Cadets of the Military Institute of dressed in historical parade uniforms during a Victory Day Parade.

The Alexander Lebed Military Institute of the Ministry of Defense (Russian: Военный институт Министерства обороны имени генерал-лейтенанта Александра Ивановича Лебедя), is a higher military institution based in Tiraspol that is operated by the military department of the Armed Forces of Transnistria. It is the seniormost educational institution in the armed forces. It is headed by Colonel Igor Dovgulich.

== Background ==
It was founded originally on 7 May 1993 and was reorganized as an independent institution from the military faculty of the civilian Shevchenko Transnistria State University on 30 April 2008. In August 2009, the institute was awarded a battle flag and was given the honor of being renamed to honor Alexander Lebed in July 2012. By decree of President Yevgeny Shevchuk on 19 August 2015, it was reorganized into a higher state educational institution.

== Officer training ==
The training of cadets is carried out in a four-year training program in accordance with the established state educational standards of vocational training. The training is conducted in three areas: the commander of a motorized rifle platoon, the commander of an artillery platoon and an officer-educator.

The form of education is full-time, with training being carried out in the Russian language primarily. In addition, the institute provides training for reserve officers from among male students studying in the full-time department of Shevchenko University who are under the age of 27 years. Upon graduation, cadets are assigned an officer rank of Lieutenant. The military institute operates a research laboratory called SEARCH, founded in 2002. The SEARCH research laboratory is aimed at collecting, analyzing the experience of local wars and recent military conflicts, developing and summarizing educational and methodological reference materials, as well as publishing electronic textbooks.

== Activities ==
Cadets have the role of taking part in the historical column of Victory Day Parades and the Republic Day of Transnistria parade. Dressed in the uniforms of the Red Army, they usually carry the standards of all 13 fronts of the Great Patriotic War. They also drive the T-34-85, the Katyusha rocket launcher, and the American Willy car.

== Leaders of the Military Institute ==
- Head of the Military Institute
- First Deputy Head of the Institute - Head of the Educational Unit
- Deputy Head of the Institute for Educational Work
- Deputy Chief of the Institute - Commander of a Cadet Battalion
- Deputy Head of the Institute for Logistics
- Deputy Head of the Institute for Armaments - Head of the Technical Department

== Departments of the Military Institute ==
- Department of Tactics
- Department of Military Use of Weapons
- Department of Armament and Shooting
- Department of Operation of Armored and Automotive Vehicles
- Department of Moral and Psychological Support
- Department of Peacekeeping Management
- Department of Physical Education and Sport
- Department of Special Military Disciplines

== See also ==
- Alexandru cel Bun Military Academy
- Ivan Chernyakhovsky National Defense University of Ukraine
- Military University of the Ministry of Defense of the Russian Federation
