= Tiraspol Suvorov Military School =

Military academy and boarding school

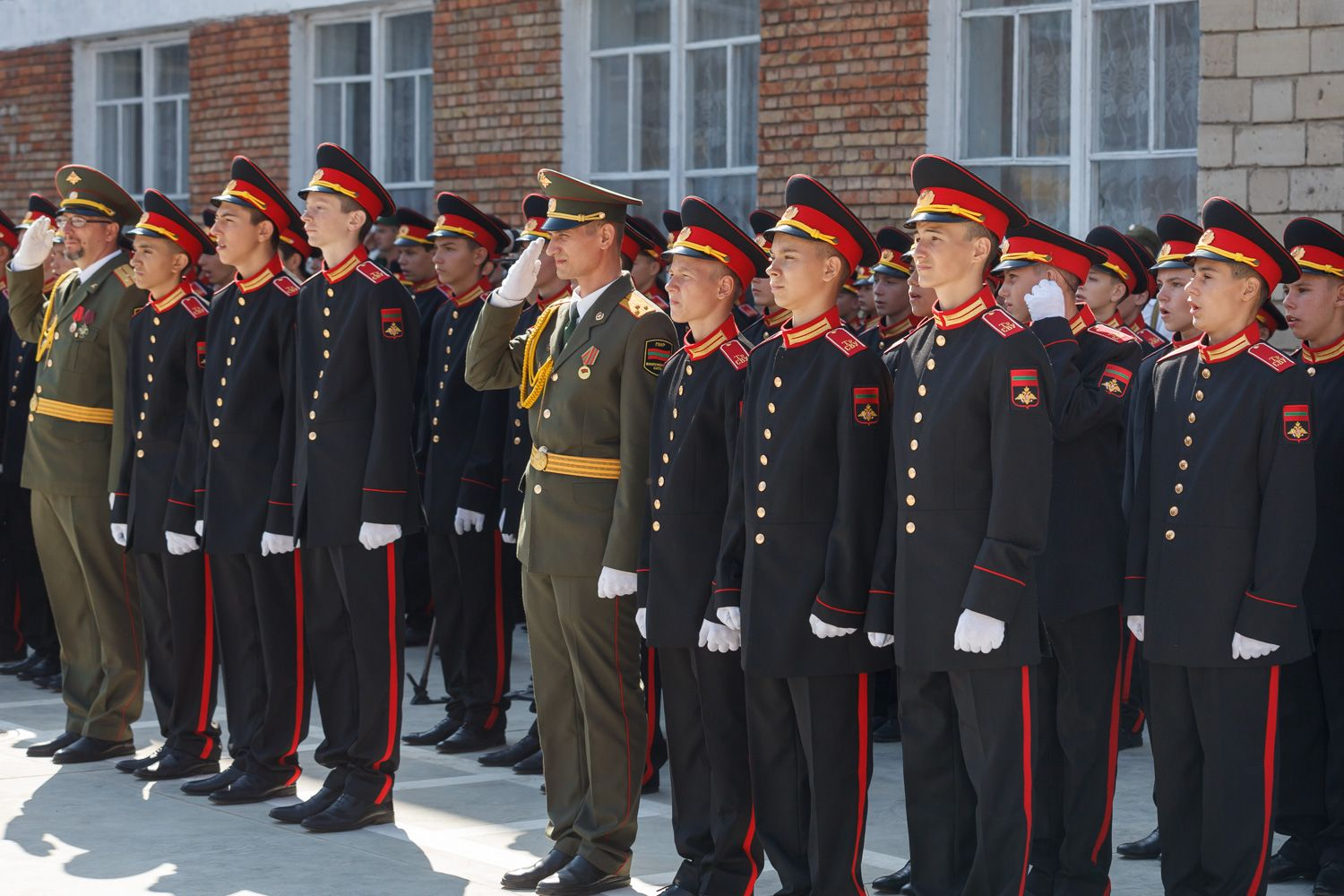
Cadets of the school at its opening ceremony.

The Tiraspol Suvorov Military School (TrSVU) (Note: Russian: Тираспольское Суворовское военное училище, romanized: Tiraspolskoye Suvorovskoye voyennoye uchilishche; Romanian: Școala militară ”Suvorov”; Ukrainian: Тирасполь Суворовська військова школа, romanized: Tyraspol Suvorovska viiskova shkola) is a military academy and boarding school in the breakaway state Pridnestrovian Moldavian Republic that serves as the military school for young adults in the Armed Forces of Transnistria. It is one of two Suvorov Military Schools located in other former Soviet Republics for military cadets. Currently located on Zelinsky Street in Tiraspol, the incumbent officer-in-charge of the school is Sergei Alexandrov.

== History ==
It was officially founded by the Government of the PMR on 1 September 2017. It was opened during a ceremony attended by President Vadim Krasnoselsky. The cadets of the Tiraspol Law Institute dressed in the historical form of musketeers of the Imperial Russian Army were a central part of the opening ceremony. Since then, all open days have taken place in September, attended by all political figures. In 2020, among the honorary guests was the delegation from Nagorno-Karabakh led by the Chairman of the National Assembly Artur Tovmasyan and the commander of the Operational Group of Russian Forces, Colonel Dmitry Zelenkov.

== Anthem ==
An official anthem was authorized in August 2018 by the Defense Minister.

== Gallery ==
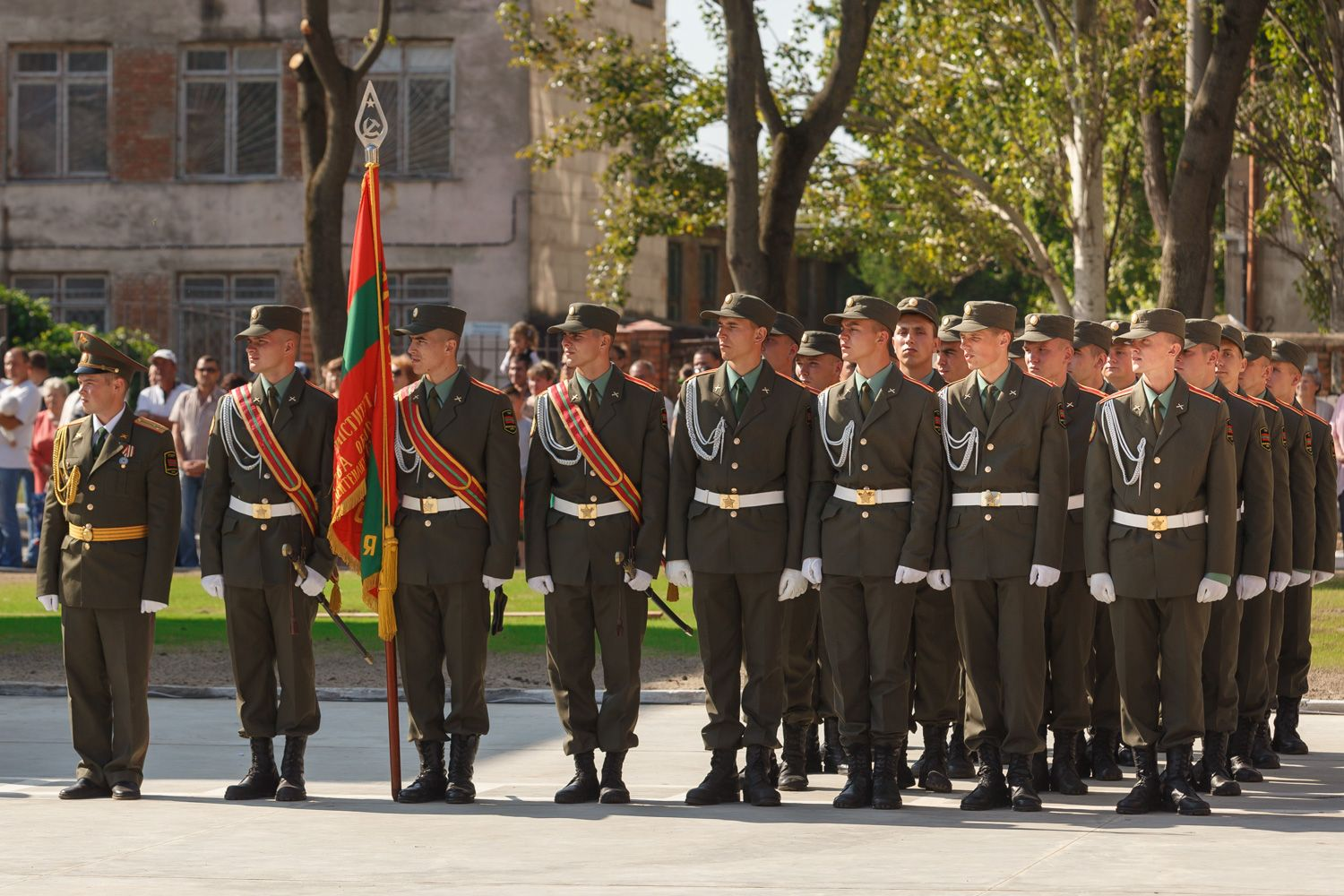

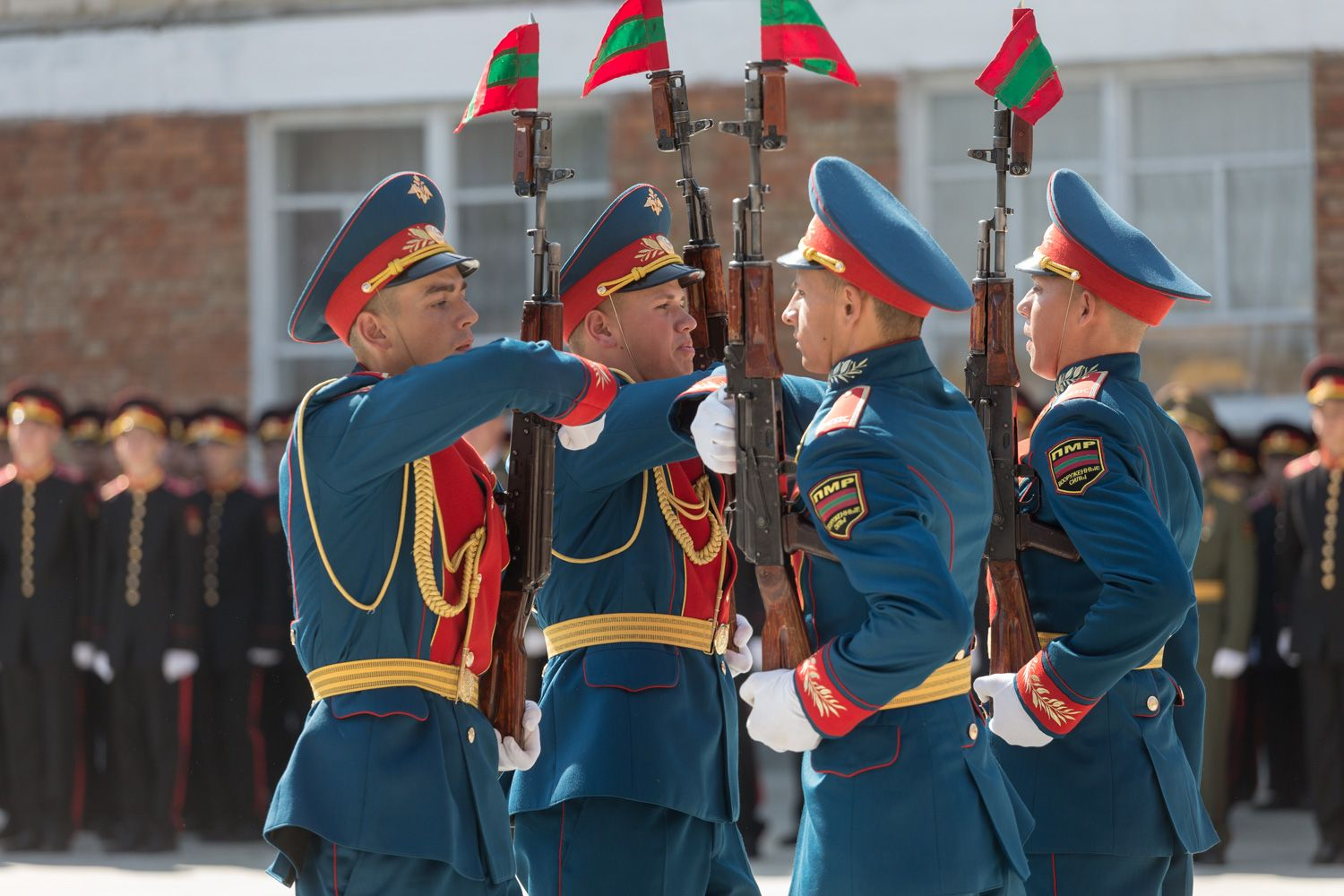

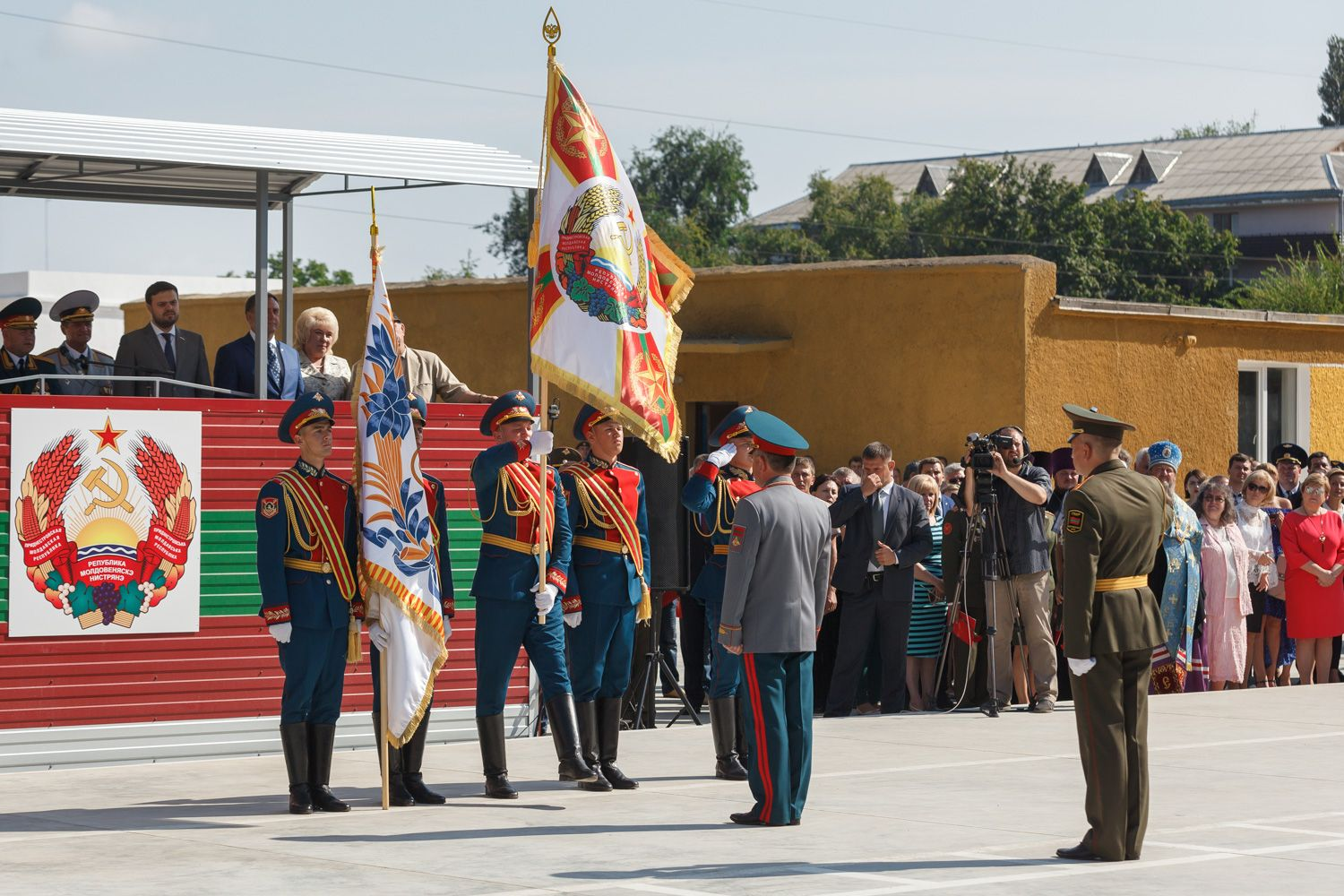

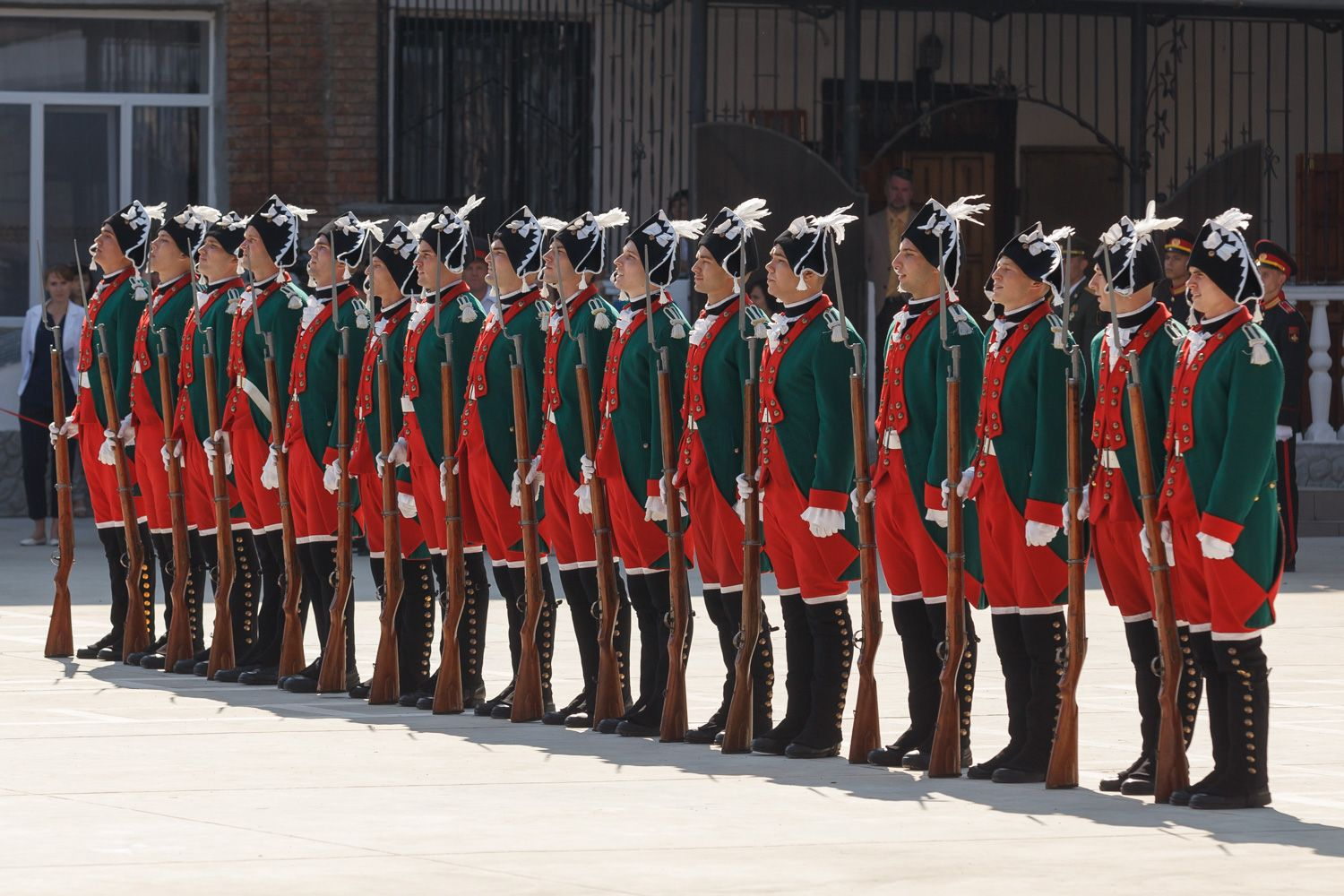
The guard of honor of the academy.

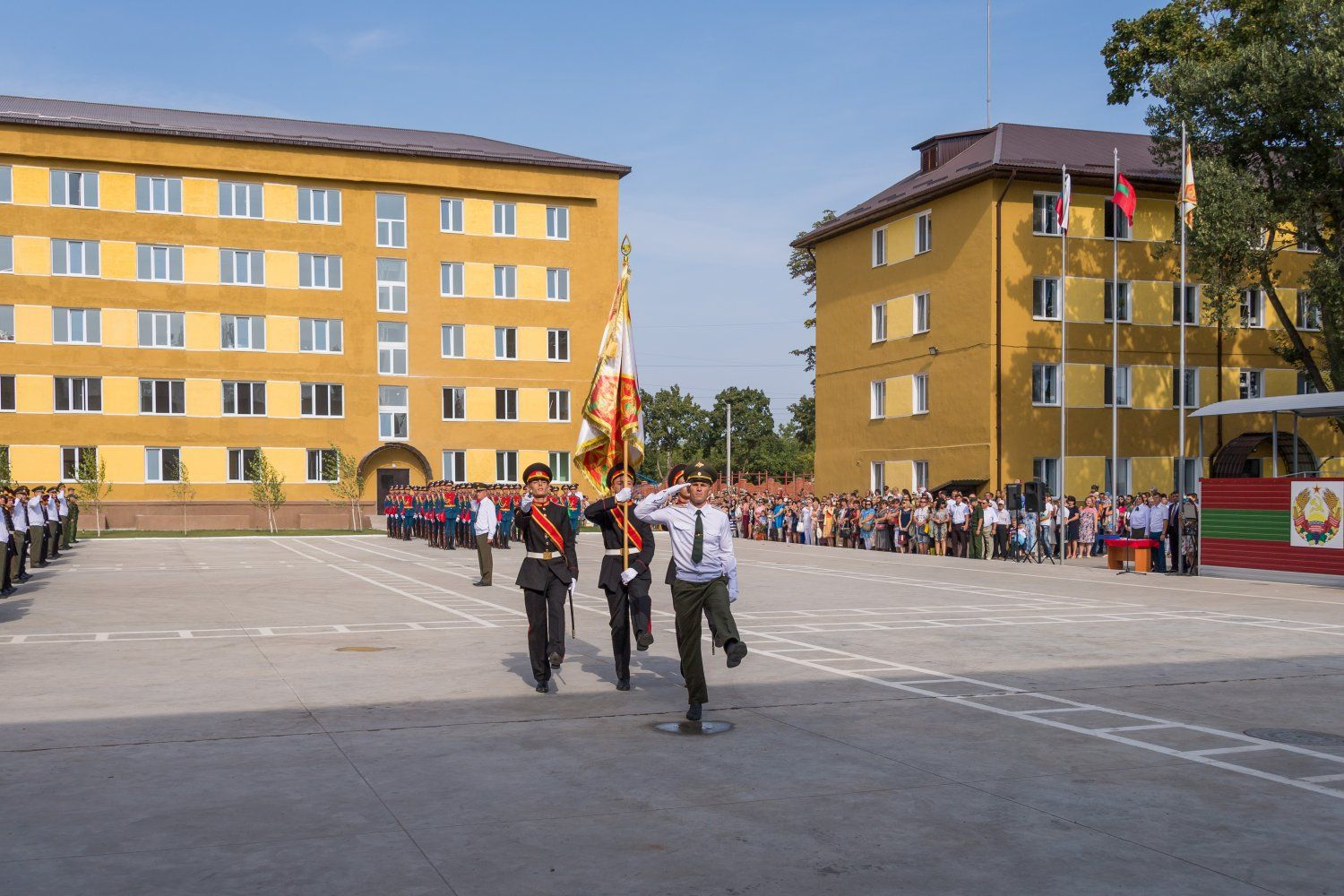
The school color guard.
