= Military Band of the General Staff of the Armed Forces of Transnistria =

Band of the General Staff of the Armed Forces of Transnistria
- Оркестр Главного штаба Вооружённых сил ПМР
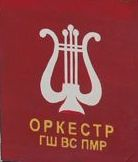
- Active: 29 March 1993 - present
- Country: Transnistria
- Branch: Armed Forces of Transnistria
- Type: Military band
- Part of: General Staff of the Armed Forces
- Headquarters: Tiraspol
- Anniversaries: Day of the Military Musician

Commanders
- Current commander: Colonel Vitaly Voinov
- Notable commanders: Valentin Memey

The Military Band of the General Staff of the Armed Forces of Transnistria (Russian: Оркестр Главного штаба Вооружённых сил ПМР) is the central military band of the Armed Forces of Transnistria. The repertoire of the band includes over 500 works by classical composers, as well as contemporary authors and arrangers.

== History ==
The Band of the General Staff of the Armed Forces of Transnistria was established by order of the Minister of Defense on 29 March 1993. At that time it was led by Vladimir Simachenko who began the formation of the staff and the organization of the creative team. The first serious test of the fledgling band was at a military parade dedicated to the third anniversary of the founding of the PMR held on Republic Day in 1993. In a short time, the band became famous and recognizable. In 1997, Vitaly Voynov was appointed director of music of the band. This period in the band has been known as a turning point. For the first time during his tenure, experienced musicians began to join the band. Most of the new musicians have devoted more than one year to the military band services in the Russian, Moldovan, and Ukrainian armies. In May 2011, the band took part in a review of military bands held in St. Petersburg, one of the few foreign engagements it has taken. It celebrated its silver jubilee in 2018 with a gala concert at its 25th anniversary with a large gala concert in the Aronetskoy Transnistrian State Drama and Comedy Theater.

=== Directors ===
- Vladimir Simachenko (March 29, 1993 – 1996)
- Lieutenant Colonel Valentin Memey (1996 – 1997)
- Colonel Vitaliy Voinov (1997 – Present)

== Gallery ==
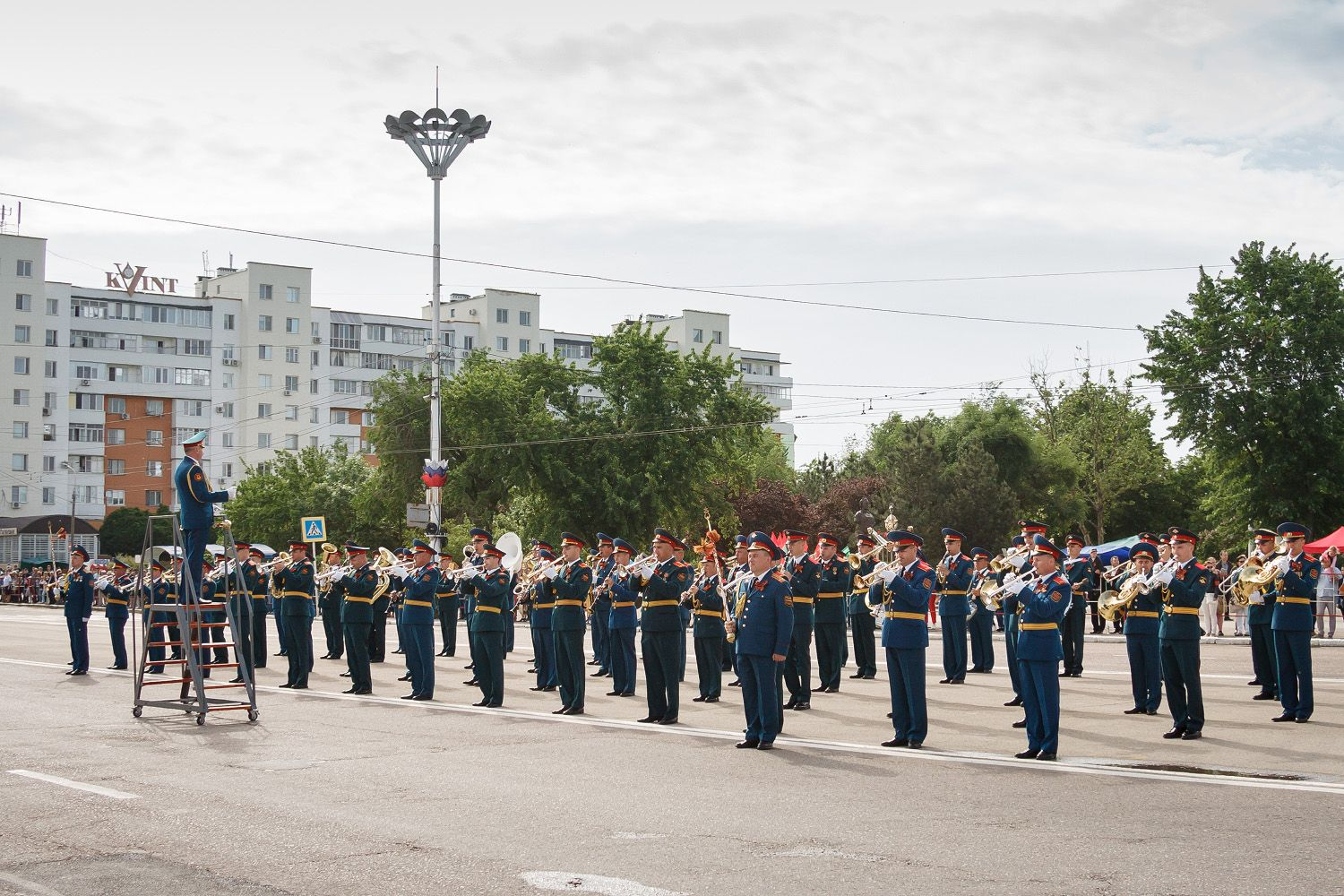
The band on Suvorov Square in 2018.

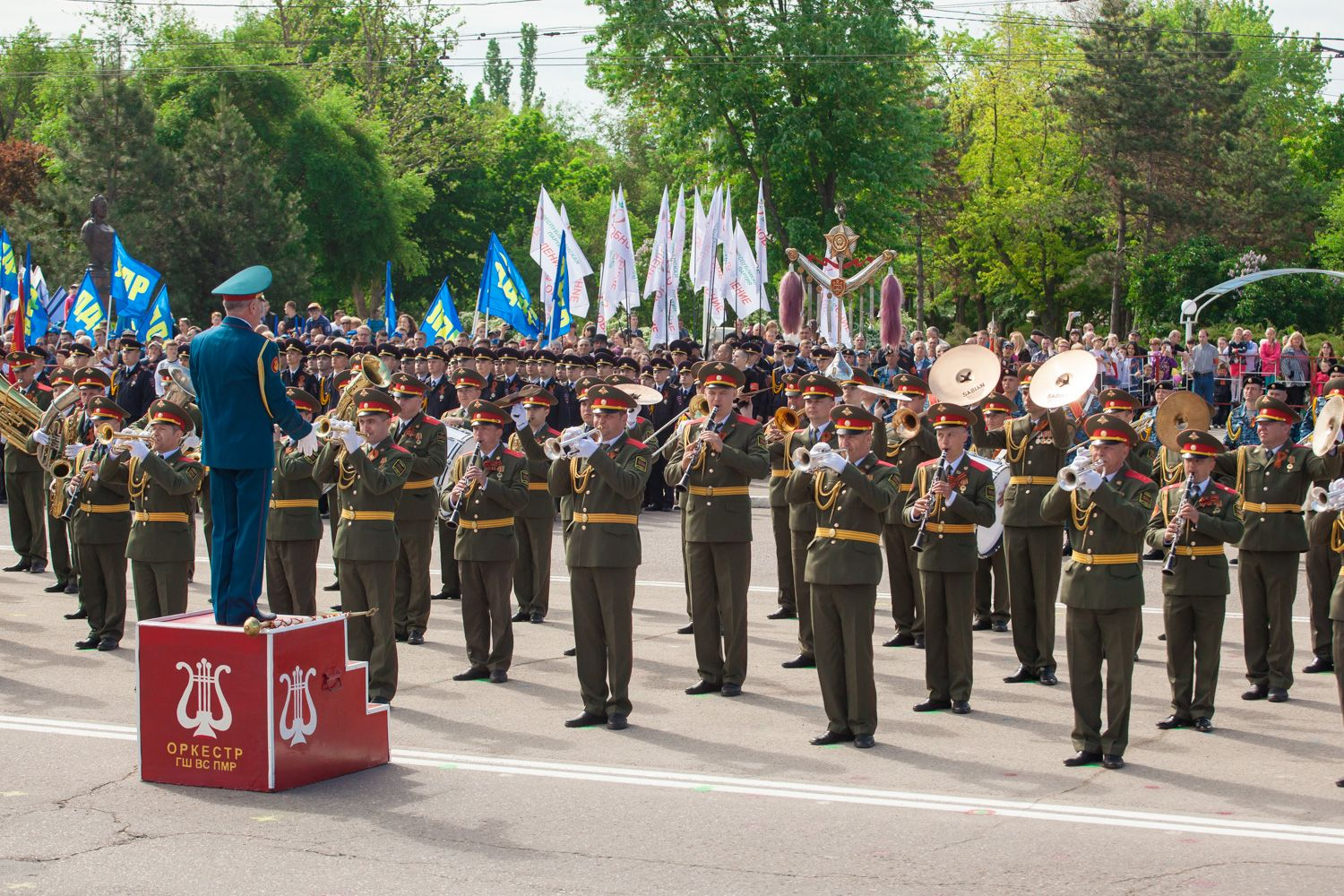

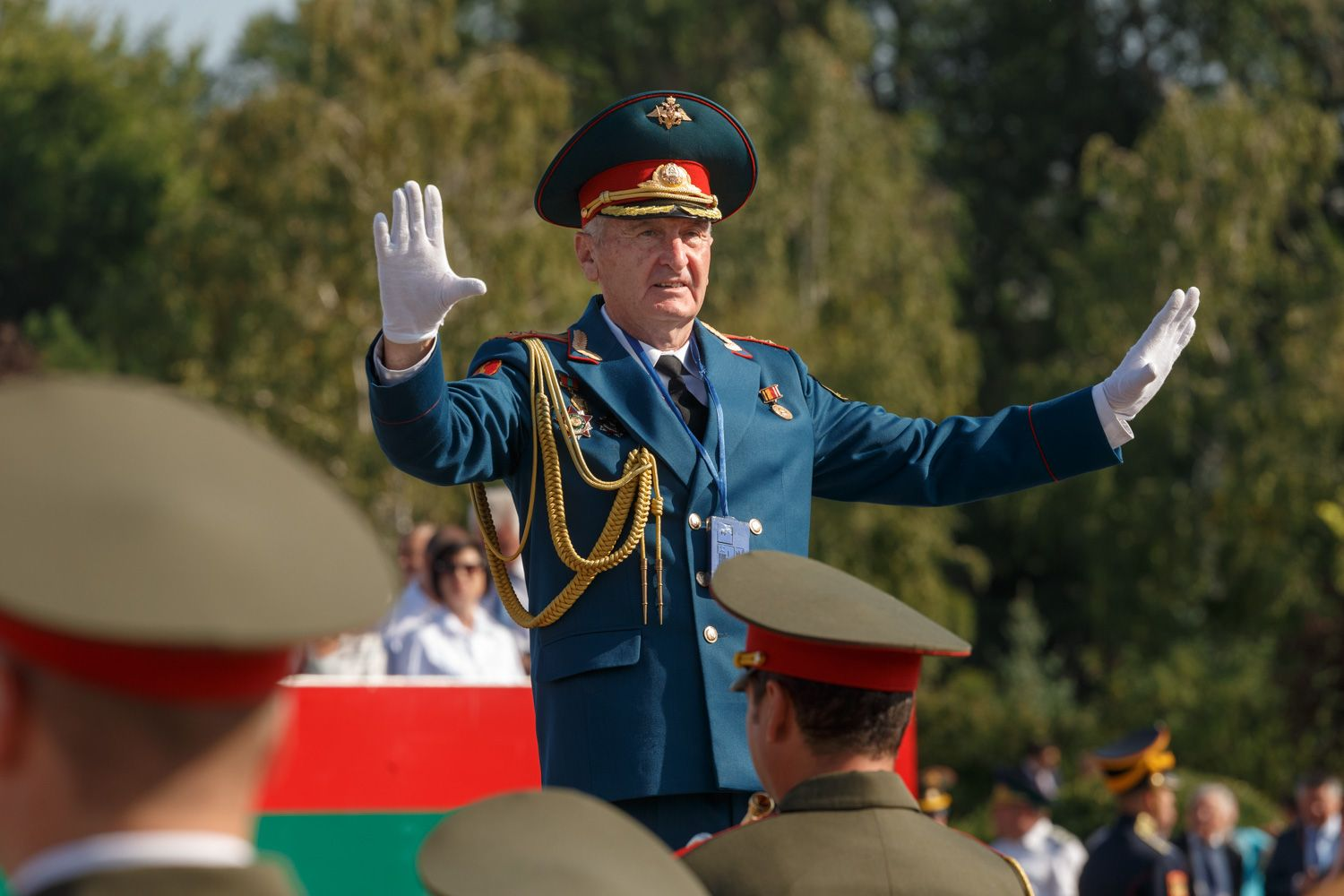
Senior director of the orchestra Colonel Vitaly Voinov.

== See also ==
- Presidential Band of the Republic of Moldova
- National Exemplary Band of the Armed Forces of Ukraine
- Special Exemplary Military Band of the Guard of Honor Battalion of Russia
