= GT-MU =

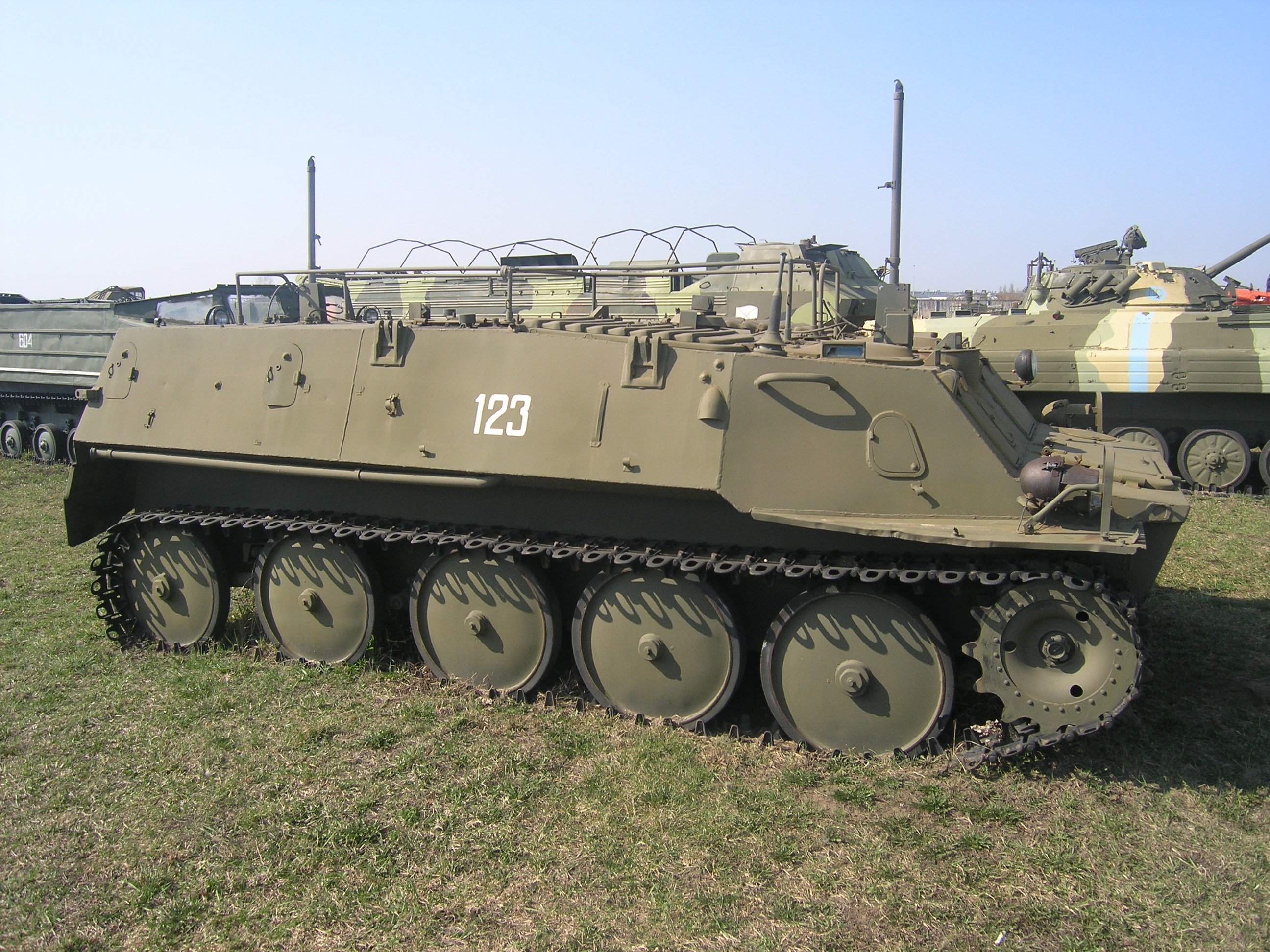
- Type: Amphibious armored personnel carrier
- Place of origin: Soviet Union

Service history
- Used by: See Operators
- Wars: First Nagorno-Karabakh War; Transnistria War

Production history
- Manufacturer: Gorkovsky Avtomobilny Zavod
- Variants: GT-MU-1D; RChM-2; SPR-1

Specifications
- Mass: 5.8 tonnes
- Length: 5.15m
- Width: 2.47m
- Height: 1.7m
- Crew: 2 + 8-10 passengers
- Armor: 6 mm all around
- Engine: GAZ-73 V8 115hp liquid-cooled engine 173 hp
- Suspension: Torsion bar
- Operational range: 500km
- Maximum speed: 60km/h (on road); 5-6km/h (Amphibious speed on water)

The GT-MU (Russian: ГТ-МУ) is an all-terrain, lightly armored and buoyant tracked vehicle developed in the then Soviet Union. The vehicle was developed in the Gorkovsky Avtomobilny Zavod and is a further development of the GT-SM. The vehicle was primarily used by airborne forces as an armoured personnel carrier and carrier for special vehicles.

== Development ==
The GT-MU was derived from the unarmored GT-SM developed at the Gorky Automobile Plant in the 1960s. The reason was the need for a small, light, but armored and all-terrain transport vehicle for the airborne troops. The basic construction was adopted, but the hull was welded from armored steel. Serial production began in 1971 in Zavolzhye, Nizhny Novgorod Oblast by the Zavolzhsky Caterpillar Tractor Factory.

== Construction ==
The hull of the vehicle is welded from armored steel with a thickness of six millimeters. The armor protects the crew from small arms and shrapnel. The tub, which is closed on all sides, is divided into several compartments separated by partitions. The driver and the commander find their place in the front of the vehicle. Both can observe the terrain in front of them through large viewing windows, which can be closed with armor plates if necessary, then the observation takes place via tank periscope. The engine compartment follows immediately, followed by the cargo hold, which can accommodate six to ten soldiers or payloads. Access to the vehicle is through two hatches in the rear wall of the fighting compartment and for the driver and commander through hatches on the hull.

The engine originally used was the GAS-73 four-cylinder carburettor engine, which was also used in the GT-SM and has an output of 113 hp. In the GT-MU-1D (ГТ-МУ-1Д) version, the GAS-5441.10 air-cooled supercharged diesel engine is installed, which has an output of 173 HP. The gearbox has four forward and one reverse gear.

The crawler track has five large rollers on each side, which are spring-loaded with torsion bars. The last roller on each side also serves as an idler wheel, which is also used to tension the chain. The drive wheel is in front. The spring deflection of all rollers is limited by rubber buffers, the first and last rollers are additionally limited by internal telescopic shock absorbers. In the water, the GT-MU is powered by the crawler tracks.

== Modifications ==
=== GT-MU-1D ===
Version with supercharged diesel engine.

== Versions ==
The GT-MU serves as the base vehicle for a number of military systems.

=== RChM-2 ===
Chemical reconnaissance vehicle.

=== SPR-1 ===
The SPR-1 (1L21/1) is a radio measuring detonator jamming station. The station emits targeted Impulse Response Jammers to prematurely detonate projectiles and shells with Radio Distance Fuses. Three entered service with the East German National People's Army (NVA) in 1987.

== Operators ==
=== Current operators ===
- Moldova
- Transnistria
- Ukraine. A Ukrainian GT-MU converted to an armoured personnel carrier was listed as captured by Russian separatist forces in Donbas during the 2022 Russian invasion of Ukraine.

=== Former operators ===
- Azerbaijan
- Soviet Union
