= Republic Day of Transnistria =

State holiday in Transnistria

Republic Day
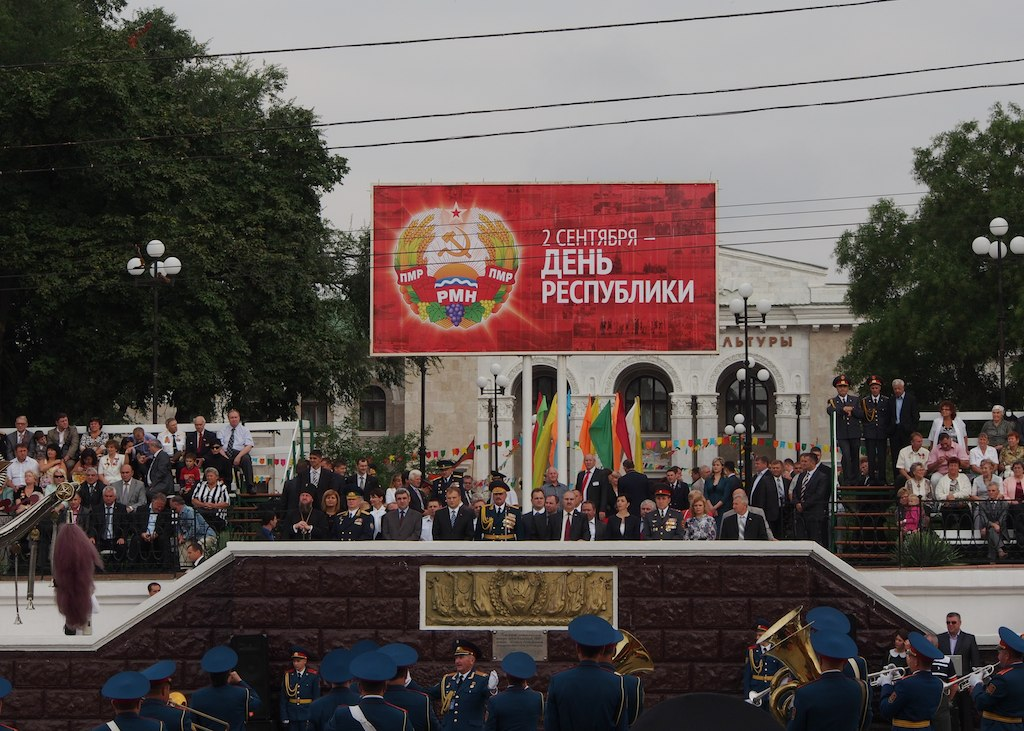
- The political leadership of the PMR observing the parade from a grandstand in 2014.
- Official name: Russian: День Республики; Romanian: Зиуа Републичий / Ziua Republicii; Ukrainian: День Республіки
- Observed by: Transnistria
- Type: State
- Celebrations: Fireworks, Concerts, Parades
- Date: September 2
- Next time: 2 September 2026
- Frequency: annual

Republic Day (Russian: День Республики Приднестровья; Romanian: Ziua Republicii Transnistriei, Moldovan Cyrillic: Зиуа Републичий Нистериеи; Ukrainian: День Республіки Придністров'я) also known in the West as Independence Day or National Day is the main state holiday in the self-proclaimed republic of Transnistria. This date is celebrated annually on September 2.

== History ==
In late April 1990, the Supreme Soviet of Moldova adopted a new national flag based on the Romanian tricolor flag, which set the stage for conflict between the Chişinău government and the government in the Pridnestrovian Moldavian Soviet Socialist Republic (PMSSR). Three days later, the Tiraspol City Council announced that it would not accept the new flag in the PMSSR, instead saying that the Flag of the Moldovan SSR claims precedence in the PMSSR. In the weeks that followed the decision, many cities in the PMSSR sided with the Tiraspol City Council, while enacting their own measures to counteract Chişinău.

The First Congress of People's Deputies of the PMSSR in 1990.

On September 2, 1990, the then PMSSR declared its independence from the Moldovan SSR, becoming the Pridnestrovian Moldavian Republic (PMR). This happened in response to fears of Moldova's unification with Romania following the fall of dictator Nicolae Ceaușescu, as well as hopes of the creation of a pro-Soviet republic that would remain in the USSR. 2 months later, the Moldovan authorities invaded Transnistria in an attempt to take control of the region. The war eventually ended in a ceasefire on July 21, 1992.

== Holiday programme and celebrations ==
Trade fairs, concerts, and cultural dances are held in the major areas of the capital. A two-hour military parade of the Armed Forces of Transnistria is annually held on Suvorov Square in the center of Tiraspol. The parade usually features 19 military contingents led by the Grigory Potemkin Republican Cadet Corps. The first one in the republic's history took place on the third anniversary in 1993. Attendees include the president, the Prime Minister of Transnistria and members of the Supreme Council. Generally, the format of the ceremony is constant, but as to events "we change the program every year" according to a top Transnistrian general. Many of the parades and celebrations are held with the participation and involvement of the Operational Group of Russian Forces in Moldova.

The first major anniversary occurred in 1995, during which students educational institutions in Tiraspol conducted theatrical performance on the history of the country. Transnistrian organizations such as the Black Sea Cossack army, the national militia, and the Union of Women took part in the celebrations. In 2000, during the 10th anniversary celebrations, the first jubilee medal was commissioned during the celebrations. In 2005, Official delegations from Russia, Ukraine, Belarus, South Ossetia, Nagorno-Karabakh, Abkhazia, and Gagauzia attended the celebrations. And in 2010, a bicycle race was held through central Tiraspol.

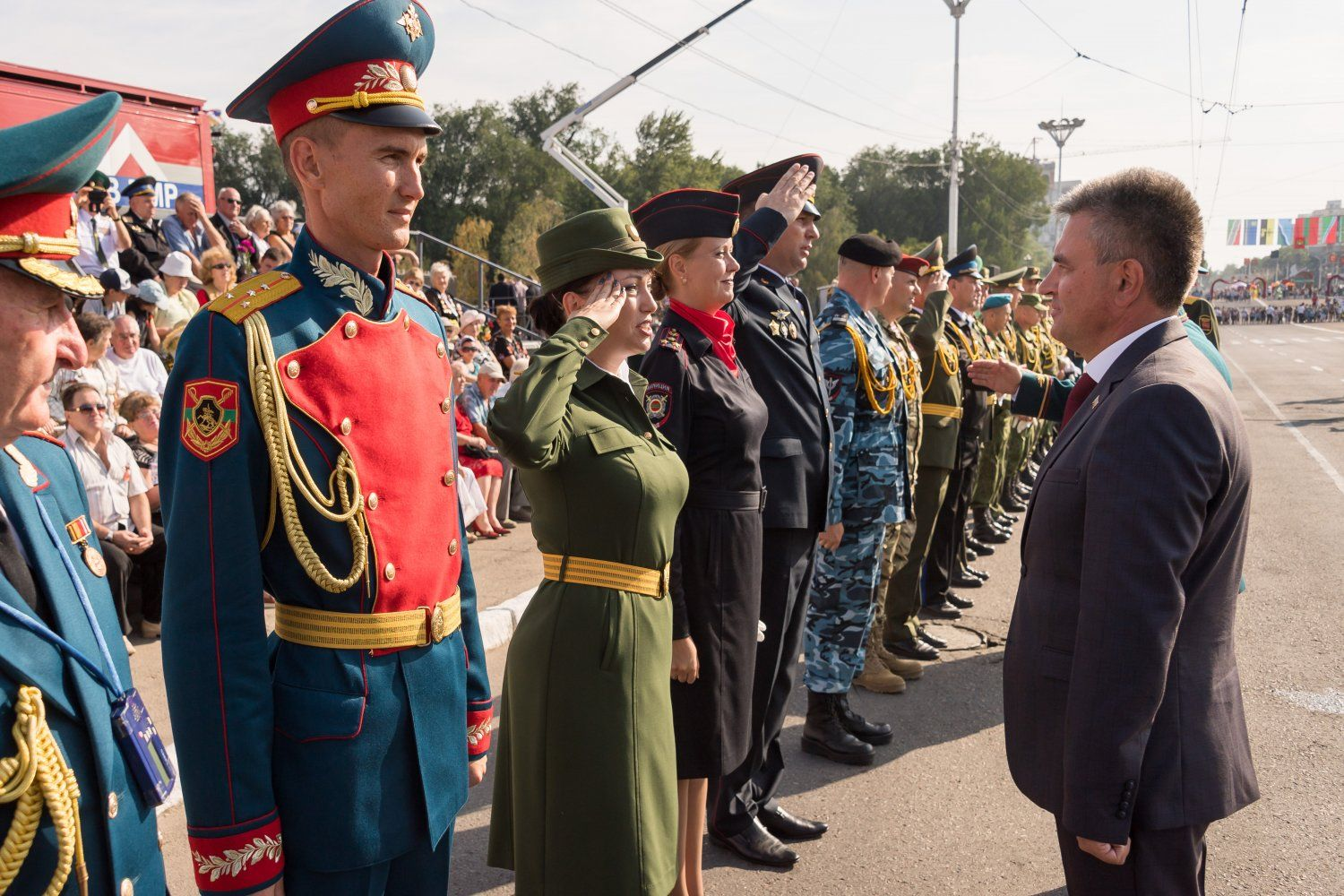
President Vadim Krasnoselsky greeting the commander of a female parade contingent.

2015 celebrated the silver jubilee of Independence. The military parade was the largest ever in the quarter-century history of Transnistria, featuring 38 military formations. A concert featuring Russian singer Polina Gagarina took place later that evening. Moldovan Minister of Defense Anatol Șalaru criticized the presence of the Russian military attaché at the parade, calling it an "unfriendly" action on Moscow's part and suspended all defence ties as a result.

In 2020, due to the COVID-19 pandemic, the Victory Day (9 May) celebrations marking the diamond jubilee of the signing of the German Instrument of Surrender were postponed, with President Krasnoselsky cancelling the Victory Day parade on Suvorov Square in a decree signed on 21 April. On 24 June, the day of the Moscow Victory Day Parade and other regional parades, it was announced that the parade in honor of the 75th anniversary of the victory would be held on Republic Day, timing also for the country's 30th anniversary.

A historical mechanized convoy was assembled (which saw the usage of the T-34-85, the Katyusha rocket launcher, and the American Willy car), with more than a hundred pieces of equipment involved as well as a two dozen horse equestrian column. The stands were also arranged different from the other festive events, with stands installed on both sides of the square, creating conditions for a larger number of spectators. The day before, Catherine Park was opened in central Tiraspol, including a monument marking Catherine the Great. For the first time, an award ceremony for distinguished residents of the republic took place on the open stage.

== Gallery ==
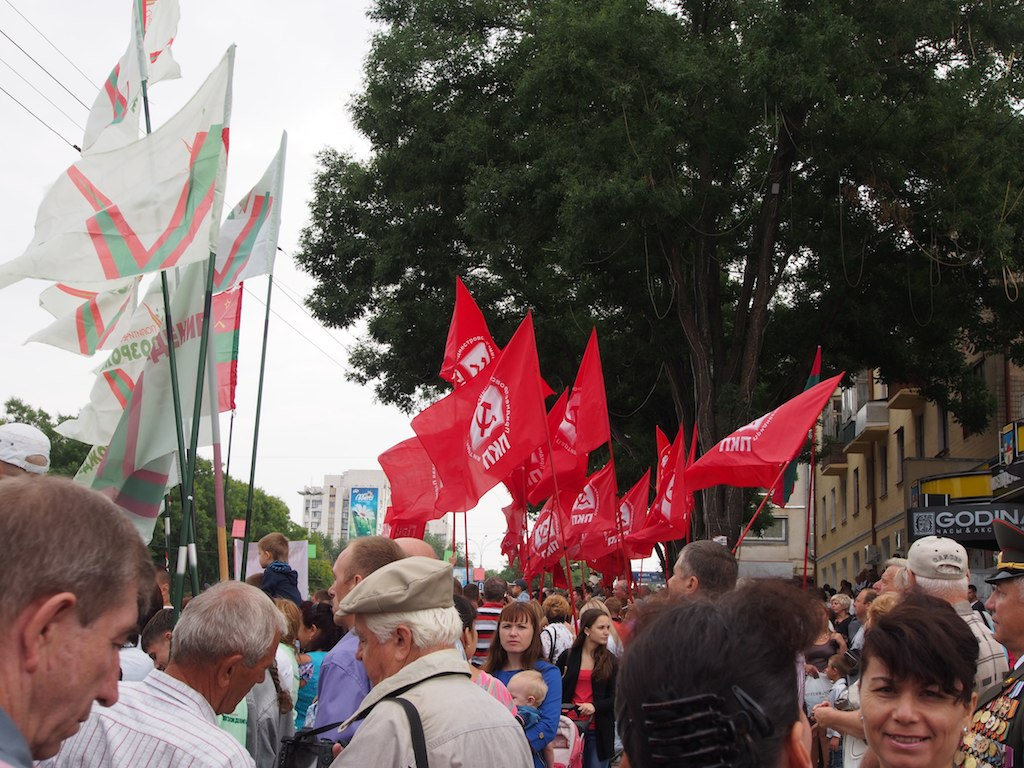

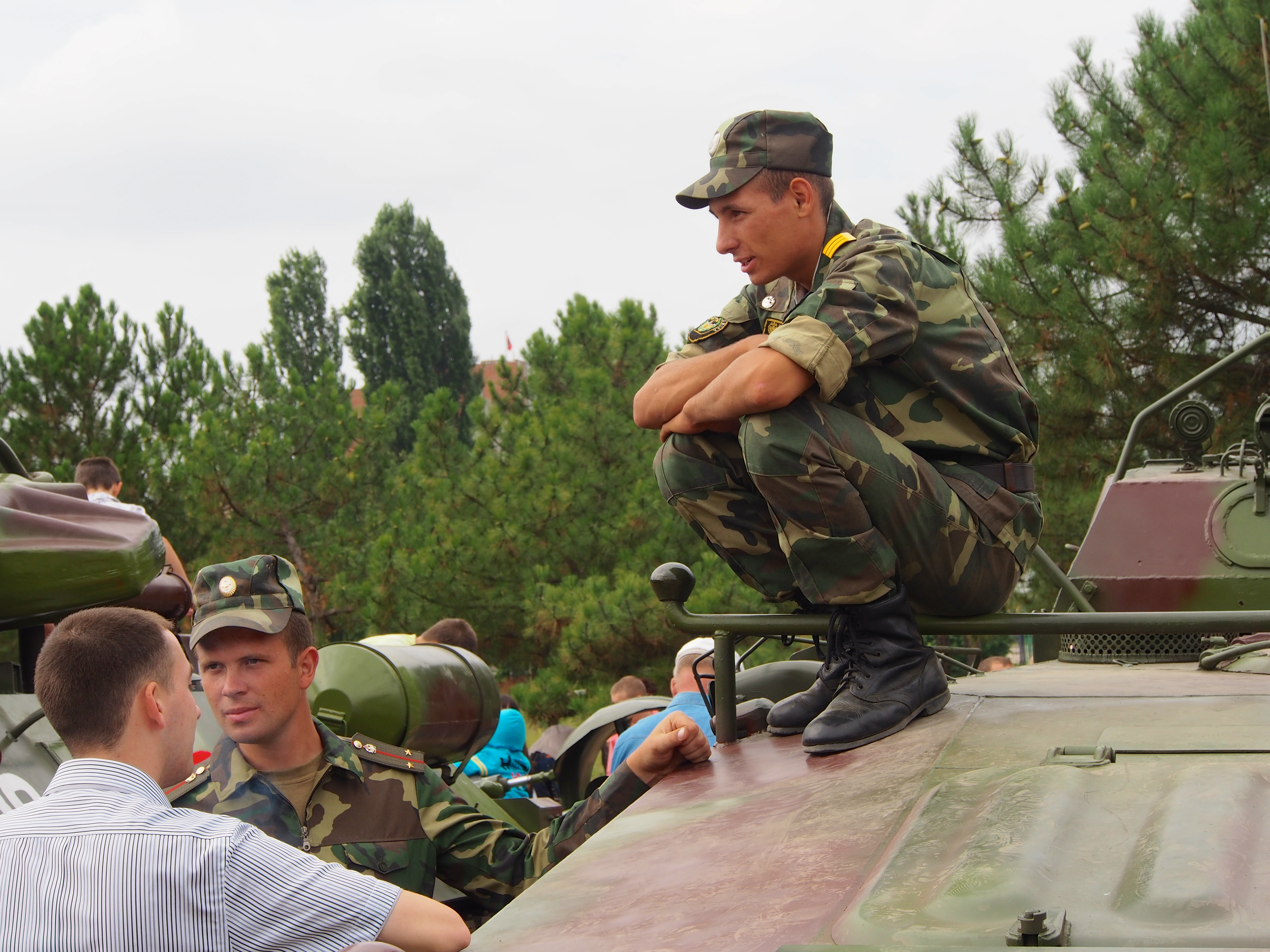

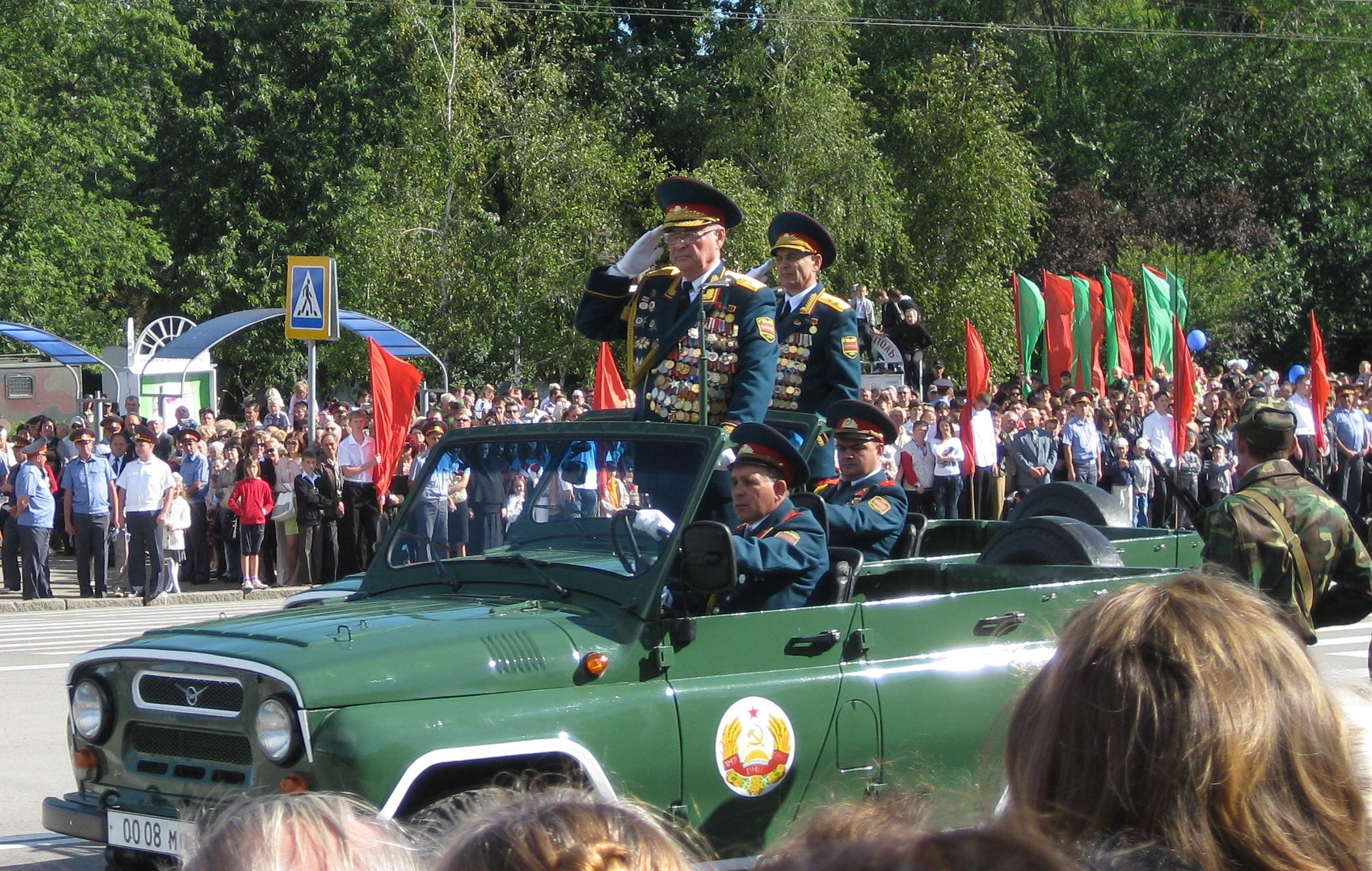
A parade in 2011.

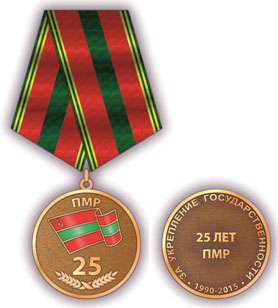
A medal issued for the 25th Anniversary of the independence of the Pridnestrovian Moldavian Republic (Transnistria).

== See also ==
- Public holidays in Transnistria
- Suvorov Square (Tiraspol)
- Independence Day (South Ossetia)
