= Joint Control Commission =

Trilateral peacekeeping force on the Moldova–Ukraine border

The Joint Control Commission (Romanian: Comisia Unificată de Control, CUC; Russian: Объединенная контрольная комиссия, romanized: Obyedinennaya Kontrolnaya Kommissiya, ОКК), also known as the Unified Control Commission, is a trilateral peacekeeping force and joint military command structure from Moldova, Transnistria (Pridnestrovian Moldavian Republic / PMR), and Russia that operates in a demilitarized zone on the border between the Republic of Moldova and Ukraine. The disputed territory between the two is controlled by Transnistria.

== History ==
Following the Transnistria War, the Joint Control Commission was established on the initiative of Moldovan and Russian presidents Mircea Snegur and Boris Yeltsin by the signing of a cease-fire agreement on July 21, 1992. It consists of soldiers and officers from Moldovan, Transnistian and Russian military. In 1998, the commission was enlarged by the addition of 10 Ukrainian officers as military observers. Moreover, the Organization for Security and Co-operation in Europe also has a Transnistria-based observation mission and participates in all JCC meetings. The current peacekeeping mechanism is a multi-state mission equipped with an international mandate that began deployment on 29 July 1992.

Of the three original sides supplying troops, Russia has traditionally provided the most with Moldova second and the smallest contingent provided by Transnistria. As of 2006, however, both Moldova and Transnistria participate with slightly more soldiers than Russia: Moldova currently supplies 403 men to the force, Transnistria 411 men and Russia up to 385 men.

On 1 January 2012 a citizen was fatally wounded by the Russian side. This event and its sequelae are known in these pages as the 2012 Moldova security zone incident.

In April 2023 during the Russian invasion of Ukraine, concern was expressed over an unheralded, and therefore suspicious, Russian troop movement. The Russian side said that it was a mistake while an American expert stated that this event could be a probe.

== Mission ==
The Joint Control Commission is charged with ensuring observance of the ceasefire and security arrangements and has generally been successful, as the armed conflict has not at any time re-erupted since 1992. The demilitarized buffer zone, known locally as the Dniester Valley Security Zone, or simply Security Zone, roughly follows the outline of the Dniester river. It is 225 kilometres long and from 1 to 15 kilometres wide.

As per the 1992 agreement with Moldova, Russia has a right to keep 2,400 troops in Transnistria. However, as of 2006 the number of Russian troops was just 1,500, with between 349 and 385 of those assigned to JCC at any given time. In 2023 the number of troops was reported to be "about 1,500 men".

== See also ==
- Cobasna ammunition depot
- Russian military presence in Transnistria
