= Corruption in Moldova =

Corruption in Moldova describes the prevention and occurrence of corruption in Moldova. The government in Moldova has in recent years taken several steps to fight corruption, including law enforcement and institutional setups. The prosecution of officials who are involved in corruption has also increased in recent years. However, businesses consider corruption a serious problem for doing business, and the business environment continues to be one of the most challenging in the region.

== History ==
According to Transparency International, 37% of Moldovans reported paying a bribe in 2010. One of the most perceived corrupt institutions is the police.

A large anti-corruption protest was held in Chișinău in September 2015 following a $1 billion (£655 million) bank fraud.

A 2020 paper published by the Legal Resources Centre from Moldova and sponsored by USAID analyzed the need for a specialized anti-corruption court.

On 19 April 2021, the Council of Europe Action Plan for the Republic of Moldova 2021–2024 was signed in Strasbourg, France. It is an action plan which, among other things, aims to combat corruption in the country.

In March 2023, President Maia Sandu proposed the creation of a specialized Anti-Corruption Court. She emphasized that establishing such an institution is a crucial requirement for Moldova’s progress toward European Union accession." The ACC was to be the focus of Parliamentary business from April 2023. A white paper document was published in June 2023. The IMF took notice in a March 2024 report. The Council of Europe is involved. In February 2025 Transparency International included Moldova among the "Significant Improvers" for the Eastern European and Central Asian region, (Note: Albania, Armenia, Azerbaijan, Belarus, Bosnia and Herzegovina, Georgia, Kazakhstan, Kosovo, Kyrgyzstan, Moldova, Montenegro, North Macedonia, Russia, Serbia, Tajikistan, Turkey, Turkmenistan, Ukraine, Uzbekistan) attributing the improvement to the reformed judiciary of President Sandu's government, which, spearheaded by the new Anti-Corruption Court, has actively pursued corrupt officials.

On Transparency International's 2025 Corruption Perceptions Index, Moldova scored 42 on a scale from 0 ("highly corrupt") to 100 ("very clean"), a gain of 12 points since its lowest score in 2016. When ranked by score, Moldova ranked 80th among the 182 countries in the Index, where the country ranked first is perceived to have the most honest public sector. For comparison with regional scores, the best score among Eastern European and Central Asian countries was 50, the average score was 34 and the worst score was 17. For comparison with worldwide scores, the best score was 89 (ranked 1), the average score was 42, and the worst score was 9 (ranked 181, in a two-way tie).

On April 22, 2026, a Moldovan court sentenced fugitive oligarch and former politician Vladimir Plahotniuc to 19 years in prison in absentia. He was convicted for his role in the 2014 "theft of the century," where approximately $1 billion was embezzled from Moldovan banks.

== See also ==
- Crime in Moldova
