= Maia Sandu =

President of Moldova since 2020

Her Excellency Maia Sandu
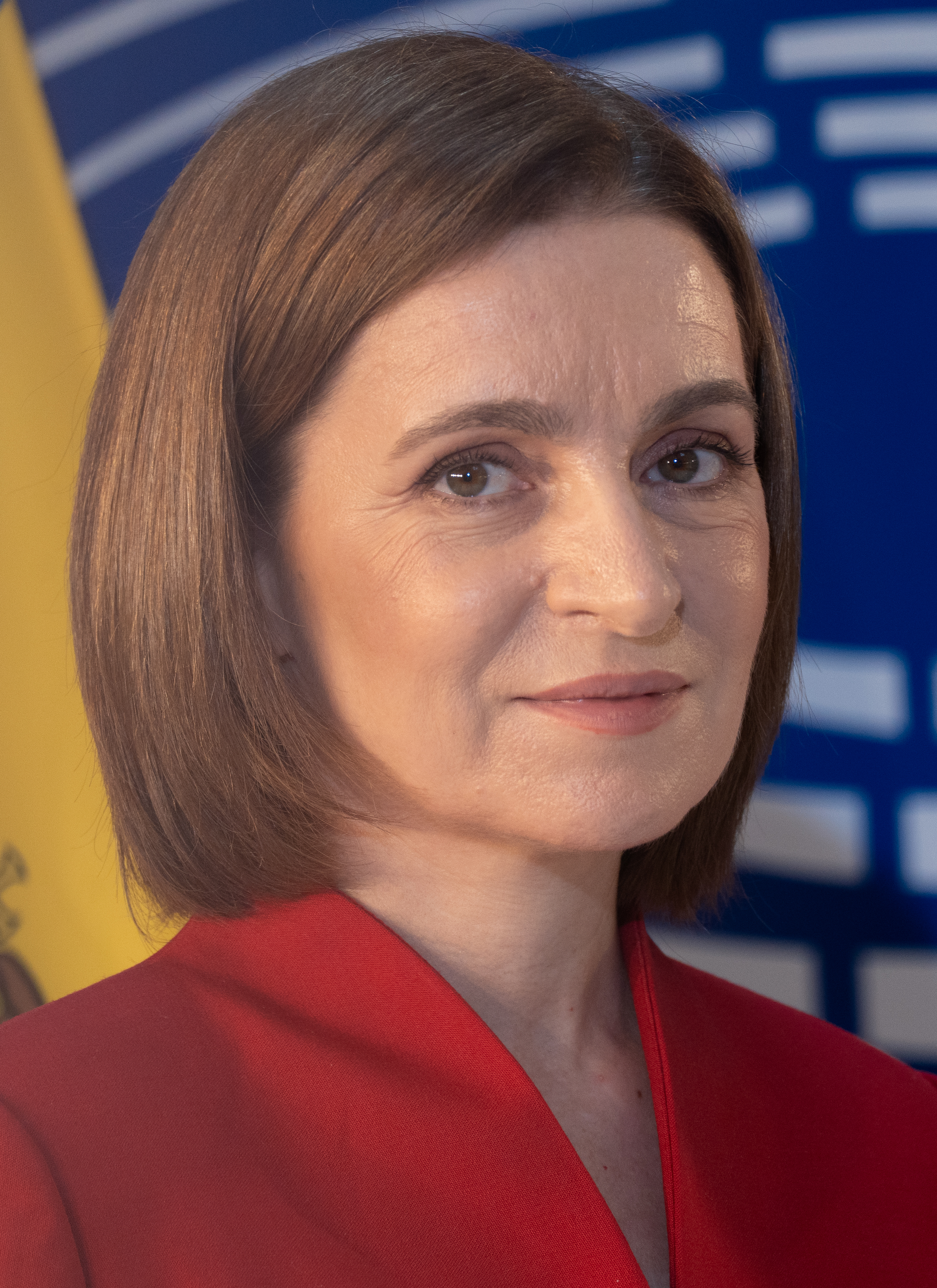
- Sandu in 2025

6th President of Moldova
- Incumbent
- Assumed office 24 December 2020
- Prime Minister: Ion Chicu; Aureliu Ciocoi (acting); Natalia Gavrilița; Dorin Recean; Alexandru Munteanu; Eugen Osmochescu (acting); Vasile Tofan
- Preceded by: Igor Dodon

President of the Party of Action and Solidarity
- In office 15 May 2016 – 10 December 2020
- Preceded by: Position established
- Succeeded by: Igor Grosu

13th Prime Minister of Moldova
- In office 8 June 2019 – 14 November 2019
- President: Igor Dodon
- Deputy: Andrei Năstase; Vasilii Șova
- Preceded by: Pavel Filip
- Succeeded by: Ion Chicu

Member of the Moldovan Parliament
- In office 9 March 2019 – 8 July 2019
- Succeeded by: Galina Sajin
- Parliamentary group: Party of Action and Solidarity
- Constituency: West of Moldova
- Majority: 49,955 (80.8%)
- In office 9 December 2014 – 20 February 2015
- Succeeded by: Petru Știrbate
- Parliamentary group: Liberal Democratic Party

Minister of Education
- In office 24 July 2012 – 30 July 2015
- President: Nicolae Timofti
- Prime Minister: Vlad Filat; Iurie Leancă; Chiril Gaburici; Natalia Gherman (acting)
- Preceded by: Mihail Șleahtițchi
- Succeeded by: Corina Fusu

Personal details
- Born: 24 May 1972 (age 54) Risipeni, Moldavian SSR, Soviet Union (now Moldova)
- Citizenship: Moldova; Romania
- Party: Independent (2020–present)
- Other political affiliations: Liberal Democratic Party (2014–2015); Party of Action and Solidarity (2016–2020)
- Education: Academy of Economic Studies of Moldova (BBM); Academy of Public Administration of Moldova (MIR); Harvard University (MPP)
- Salary: L 244,931 yearly
- Awards: Order of Work Glory; First Class Order of Prince Yaroslav the Wise; Order of Vytautas the Great with the Golden Chain; European Order of Merit
- De facto leader of the Party of Action and Solidarity (since 2020): ← (First in role)

Maia Sandu (Romanian: [ˈmaja ˈsandu]; born 24 May 1972) is a Moldovan politician and economist who, since 2020, has served as the sixth president of Moldova. She is the founder and former leader of the Party of Action and Solidarity (PAS) and was prime minister of Moldova from June to November 2019, when her government collapsed after a vote of no-confidence. Sandu was minister of education from 2012 to 2015 and member of the parliament of Moldova from 2014 to 2015, and again in 2019.

Sandu was elected president of Moldova during the 2020 Moldovan presidential election. The first female president of Moldova, Sandu is a strong supporter of the accession of Moldova to the European Union, overseeing Moldova's granting of candidate status, and is widely considered "pro-Western". She has criticised and opposed Russia's invasion of Ukraine and supported subsequent steps to reduce Moldova's economic dependence on Russia, frequently expressing sympathy and support for Ukraine in the conflict. Sandu has made anti-corruption, economic reform and liberalisation a central part of her political platform, as well as closer integration with Europe. In February 2023, she accused Russia of seeking to stage a coup of the Moldovan government and has continued to seek to reduce Russia's influence over the country.

Sandu was re-elected president in the 2024 Moldovan presidential election following an electoral campaign defined by geopolitical issues, such as the referendum on amending the constitution to include the desire for EU membership, as well as an unprecedented level of Russian electoral interference.

== Early life and career ==
Sandu was born on 24 May 1972, in the commune of Risipeni, located in the Fălești District of the Moldavian SSR, which was part of the USSR at the time. Her parents were Grigore and Emilia Sandu, a doctor and a teacher, respectively. Her father died before she became involved in politics. From 1988 to 1994, she majored in management at the Academy of Economic Studies of Moldavia/Moldova (ASEM). From 1995 to 1998, she majored in international relations at the Academy of Public Administration (AAP) in Chișinău. In 2010, she was awarded a Master's degree in public policy from the John F. Kennedy School of Government at Harvard University. From 2010 to 2012, Sandu served as an adviser to the Executive Director at the World Bank.

== Political career ==
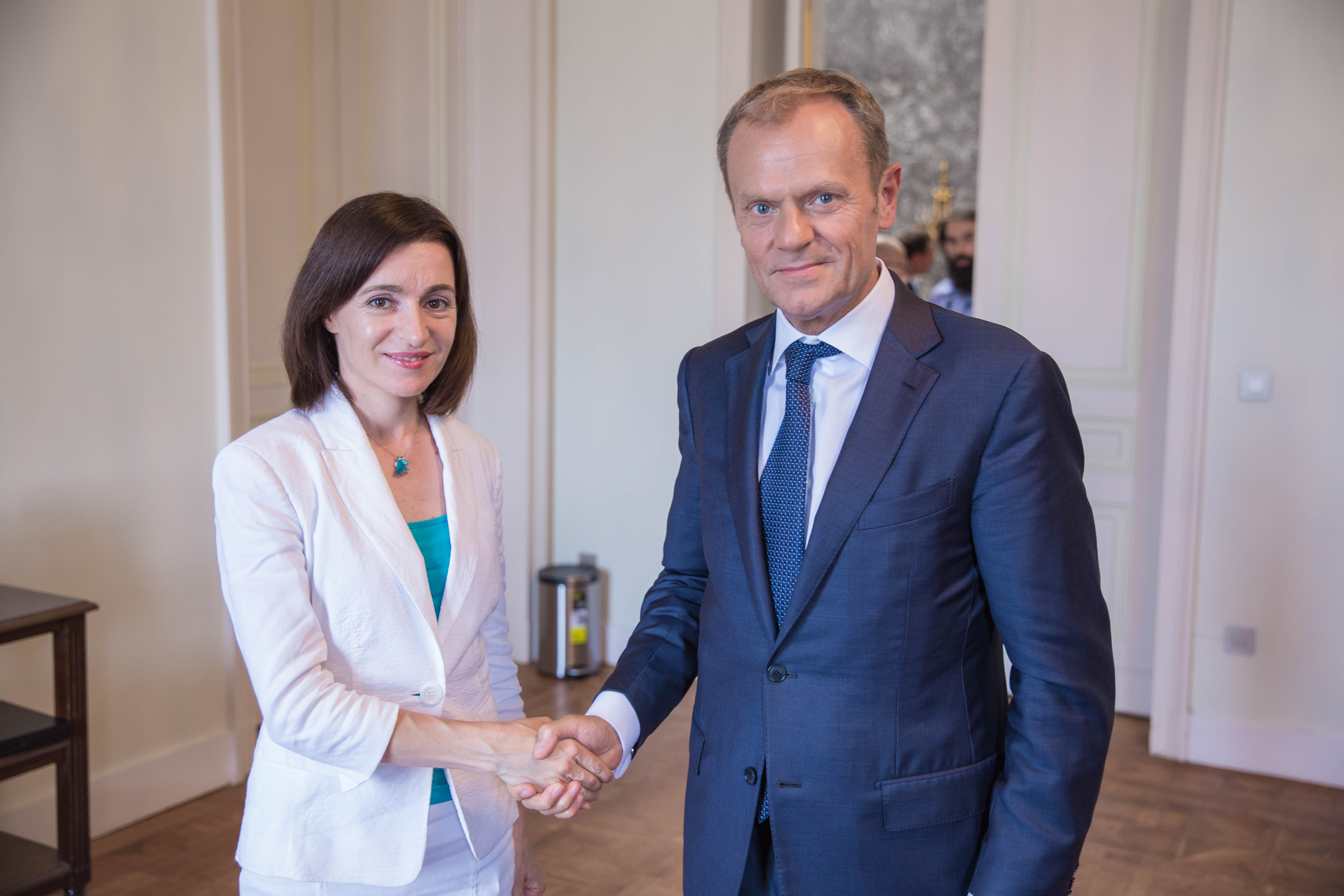
Sandu with the President of the European Council, Donald Tusk, at the EPP Summit in Brussels, 22 June 2017

From 2012 to 2015, Sandu served as Minister of Education of Moldova. She was considered on 23 July 2015 by the Liberal Democratic Party as a nominee to serve as the next Moldovan Prime Minister, succeeding Natalia Gherman and Chiril Gaburici.

A day after being proposed by a renewed pro-European coalition, Sandu set the departure of the Head of the National Bank of Moldova, Dorin Drăguțanu, and the State Prosecutor Corneliu Gurin as conditions for her acceptance of the office. Ultimately, Valeriu Streleț was nominated over Sandu by the president of Moldova.

On 23 December 2015, she launched a platform "În /pas/ cu Maia Sandu" ("In step with Maia Sandu") that later became a political party called Party of Action and Solidarity (Romanian: Partidul Acțiune și Solidaritate).

In 2016, Sandu was the pro-European candidate in the Moldovan presidential election. She was selected as the joint candidate of the pro-European PPDA and PAS parties for president of Moldova in the 2016 election. Running on a pro-EU action platform, she was one of the two candidates who managed to reach the runoff of the election. Sandu faced a significant amount of discrimination during the race, including being a target of insults and harassment for being a single woman, as well as being openly attacked by former Moldovan president Vladimir Voronin, who accused her of betraying "family values", alongside describing her as "a laughingstock, a sin, and a national disgrace of Moldova" in remarks that were widely considered as profoundly misogynistic. She rejected the insults in an interview, replying that "I never thought being a single woman is a shame. Maybe it is a sin even to be a woman?" Eventually, Sandu was defeated in the subsequent runoff by the pro-Russian PSRM candidate, Igor Dodon, losing the popular vote by a margin of 48% to 52%.

As of December 2022, Sandu ranks as the most trusted politician in Moldova, polling at 26%, with Igor Dodon following behind at 19%. According to the 2019 opinion polls conducted by Public Opinion Fund, Sandu was ranked as the second most trusted political personality in the country, polling at 24%, closely following Igor Dodon, who polled at 26%, while older polls that year placed her lower, in sixth place.

=== Controversies ===
In September 2016, Sandu instituted proceedings against the State Chancellery, demanding that she be given an insight into the minutes of the Cabinet meeting at which the state guarantees for the three bankrupt banks (the Bank of Savings (Romanian: Banca de Economii), Unibank, and the Banca Socială) had been approved. Prime Minister Pavel Filip published on his Facebook page the minutes of the last Cabinet meeting, at the time when the decision on granting the emergency credit to Banca de Economii was adopted. The minutes included the speeches of former Governor of NBM, Dorin Drăguțanu, former Prime Minister Chiril Gaburici, and Sandu's own speeches (from the time when she served as Moldova's minister of education). It is mentioned that, in the end, the decision was voted on unanimously. The minutes were not signed.

Regarding the former leader of Romania, Ion Antonescu, Sandu remarked in 2018 that he was "a historical figure about whom we may say both good and bad things." Her statements were sharply criticised by the Jewish Community of Moldova (CERM). Sandu replied to this in later interviews by stating: "I regret that my words about the dictator Ion Antonescu were made an object of interpretation. [...] Antonescu was a war criminal, rightly condemned by the international community for war crimes against Jewish and Roma people."

On 21 February 2019, Sandu and the candidates of the ACUM electoral bloc, both of the national and uninominal constituency, signed a public commitment according to which, after the Parliamentary elections of 24 February 2019, they would not make any coalition with the Party of Socialists, Democratic Party and Shor Party, while if this commitment were violated they would resign as MPs. She violated this self-imposed commitment after agreeing to form a coalition government along with the Party of Socialists in early June 2019 as the only way forward to create a legitimate and democratic government.

=== As Prime Minister ===
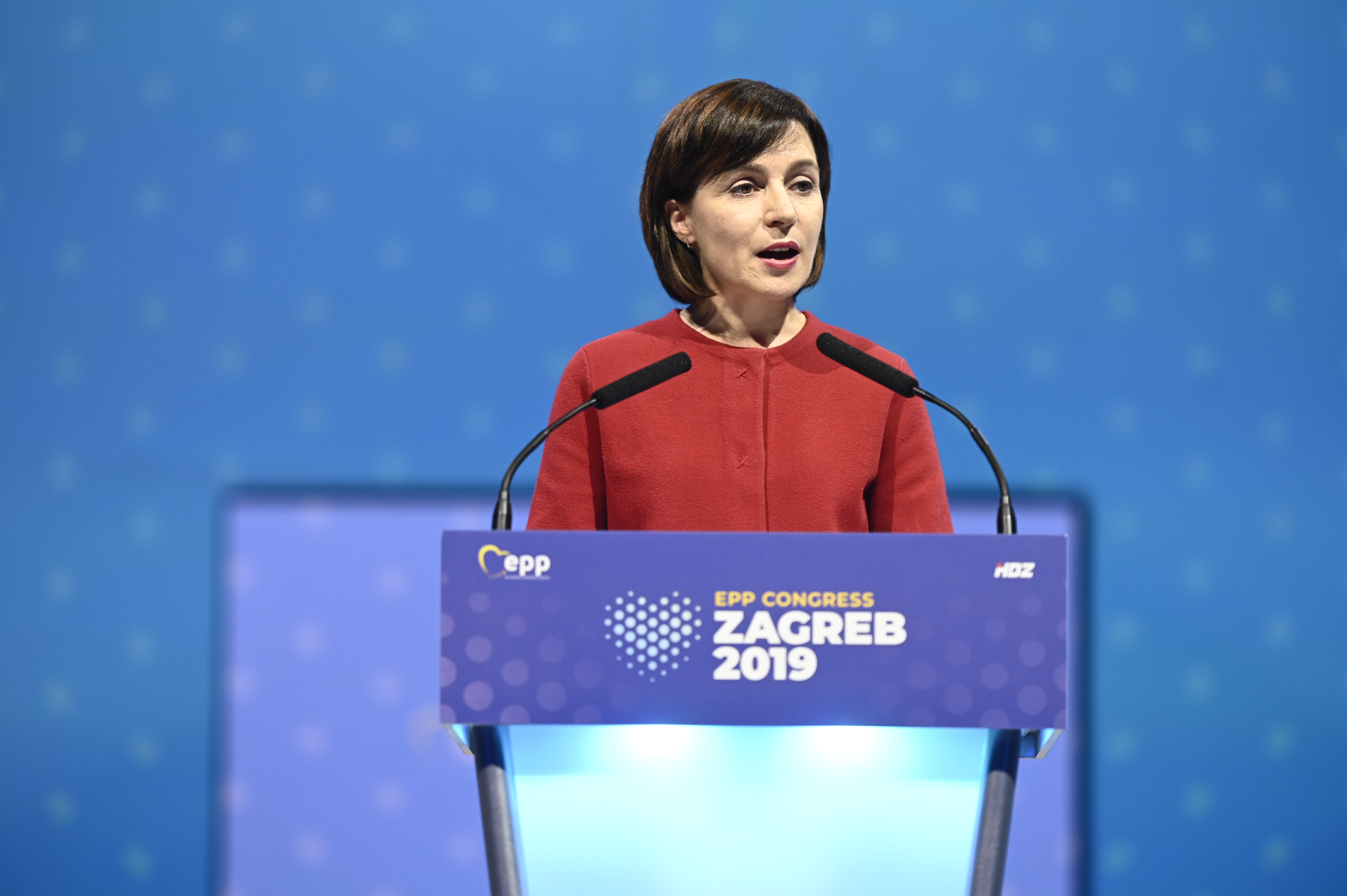
Sandu at the European People's Party Congress in Zagreb in 2019

In the 2019 parliamentary election, Sandu's PAS, together with its ally, PPDA, led by Andrei Năstase, formed the ACUM Electoral Bloc and secured 26 of the 101 seats in the Parliament of Moldova. On 8 June 2019, Sandu was elected Prime Minister of Moldova in a coalition government with PSRM. On the same day, the Constitutional Court of Moldova declared unconstitutional her designation for this position as well as the appointment of the Government of the Republic of Moldova, which sparked the 2019 constitutional crisis. However, on 15 June 2019, the Constitutional Court revised and repealed its previous decisions, declaring the Sandu Cabinet to have been constitutionally created.

The next day, she called for the restoration of public order, discouraging citizens from attending local rallies. In June 2019, she lifted a March 2017 ban by former Prime Minister Filip on official visits by government officials to Russia. In one of her first interviews with foreign media, she announced her intention to request that the United States Treasury add Vlad Plahotniuc to the Magnitsky List. In August, Sandu requested that the State Chancellery prepare a draft decree, which would officially declare 23 August as the European Day of Remembrance for Victims of Stalinism and Nazism, instead of the regular Liberation Day. The decree was opposed by her coalition partner, the PSRM, with Moldova's president and ex-PSRM leader Igor Dodon announcing that he would celebrate the date in the old style, rejecting Sandu's proposal.

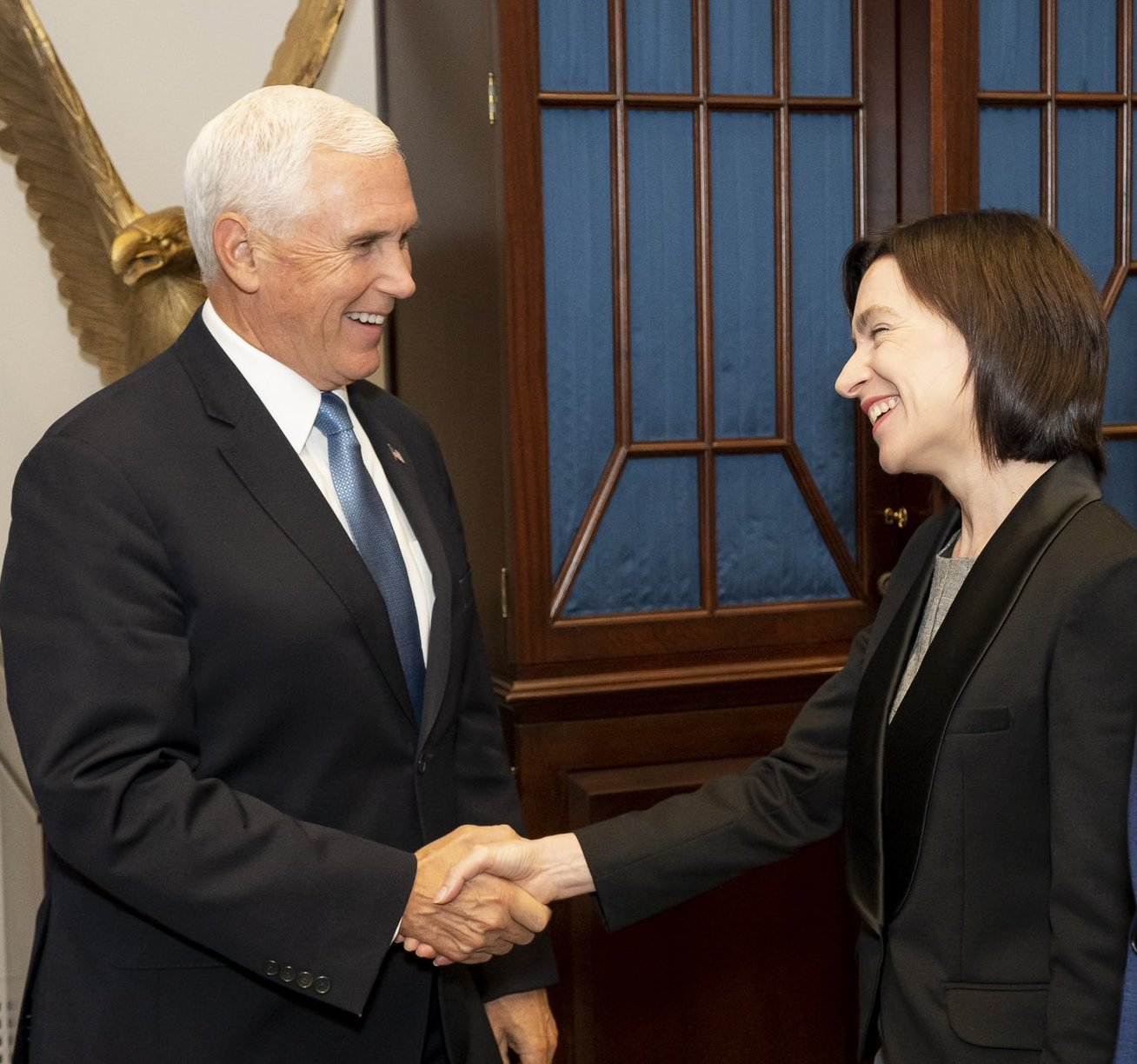
Sandu with US Vice-President Mike Pence in Washington, D.C., 18 September 2019

Under Sandu, Moldova began taking steps towards the European Union, as Sandu herself is pro-EU. Sandu was ousted as prime minister on 12 November 2019, following a vote of no confidence. She remained as a caretaker of the office until the formation of a new government. However, on 24 December 2020, Sandu took office as state president, after winning a landslide election against the pro-Russian Igor Dodon, and again on a pro-EU and anti-corruption platform. Under Sandu's leadership, Moldova is once more in a position to resume moving forward towards European integration.

=== 2020 presidential campaign ===
Sandu announced her candidacy for the 2020 presidential election on 18 July, declaring that a joint pro-European candidate would not be required as there was no risk of there being no pro-European candidates in the second round. Sandu officially launched her campaign on 2 October 2020, giving two speeches in Romanian and Russian, both times promising to fight corruption and poverty, alongside reforming the country's criminal justice system, while accusing President Dodon of deliberately hindering the latter. Considering that no candidate received a majority of votes in the first round of the election, a run-off between Sandu and Dodon was held on 15 November, in which Sandu won with 57.75% of the popular vote.

She was congratulated on her win by senior leaders of the European Union, as well as Presidents Volodymyr Zelenskyy of Ukraine, Kassym-Jomart Tokayev of Kazakhstan, Ilham Aliyev of Azerbaijan, and Klaus Iohannis of Romania. In her press conference, she declared that Moldova under her leadership "will secure real balance in the foreign policy, being guided by Moldova's national interests, we will have a pragmatic dialogue with all the countries, including Romania, Ukraine, European nations, Russia, and the United States."

=== 2024 presidential campaign ===
Launching her re-election campaign, Sandu condemned Russia's war in Ukraine as a threat to regional stability and Moldova's sovereignty. She identified both Russia and corruption as the biggest challenges facing Moldova, emphasizing that addressing these issues is crucial for Moldova's security and its aspirations for closer integration with the European Union. In the presidential debate, Sandu accused her main opponent, Alexandr Stoianoglo of the PSRM, of being a "Trojan horse" candidate for outside interests wanting control of Moldova. She said she would continue her pro-European course, saying, "Joining the European Union is Moldova's Marshall Plan". After winning a plurality of the vote in the first round, Sandu won the second round over Stoianoglo with 55.35% of the vote. Sandu declared in her victory speech; "Moldova, you are victorious! Today, dear Moldovans, you have given a lesson in democracy, worthy of being written in history books. Today, you have saved Moldova."

The 2024 Moldovan European Union membership constitutional referendum was held on the same day as the first round in the presidential election. Sandu actively campaigned for the 'Yes' vote supporting European integration, which ultimately won by a narrow margin. Sandu attributed the result of the first round and the referendum to foreign interference and described it as an "unprecedented assault on democracy", adding that her government had evidence that 150,000 votes had been bought, with an objective of 300,000. The European Union also said that the two exercises had taken place "under unprecedented interference and intimidation by Russia and its proxies".

== Presidency (2020–present) ==
- Presidency of Maia Sandu; 24 December 2020 – present
- President: Maia Sandu
- Prime Minister: Ion Chicu Aureliu Ciocoi (acting) Natalia Gavrilița Dorin Recean Alexandru Munteanu Eugen Osmochescu (acting) Vasile Tofan
- Cabinet: Gavrilița Cabinet Recean Cabinet Munteanu Cabinet Tofan Cabinet
- Party: Party of Action and Solidarity
- Election: 2020; 2024
- Seat: Presidential Palace 164 Stephen the Great Boulevard, Chișinău

Sandu was sworn in on 24 December 2020 in the Palace of the Republic. During the ceremony, she appealed for national unity, speaking in Russian, Ukrainian, Gagauz, and Bulgarian towards the end of her remarks. Thousands of her supporters greeted her outside the palace, chanting slogans like "Maia Sandu and the people!" and "The people love you!" After the ceremony, she met Dodon at the Presidential Palace for a ceremony in which Dodon officially transferred presidential power to her. That day, she met with acting Prime Minister Ion Chicu. Before taking office, she suspended her PAS membership; recent convention calls for the president to not be a formal member of a party.

Sandu ran again for president in the 2024 Moldovan presidential election, where she won 42% of the vote in the first round. She defeated former prosecutor-general Alexandr Stoianoglo in a runoff on 3 November.

=== Domestic policy ===
==== Parliament ====
On 28 December, she met the parliamentary factions for consultations. On 31 December, Sandu named Foreign Minister Aureliu Ciocoi acting prime minister after Chicu refused to stay on in an acting capacity. The ex-president of the country, leader of the Party of Communists, Vladimir Voronin, and the Leader of Our Party, Renato Usatii, proposed their candidacies for the post of prime minister. At a briefing following her visit to Ukraine, Sandu also touched upon the appointment of the prime minister, stating that "Neither Voronin nor Usatii is suitable for the role of prime minister. We need a serious government, created following early elections." On 27 January 2021, she nominated Natalia Gavrilița as a candidate for the position of Prime Minister, saying that she has the "task of creating the government team and preparing a government program focused on economic development and cleaning up the institutions of the state of corruption." The very next day, Sandu asked MPs to reject her proposed Prime Minister in order to speed up the process of dissolution and early elections.

Sandu re-nominated Gavrilița on 11 February. The Constitutional Court of Moldova declared the decree unconstitutional, reasoning that Sandu should have accepted a proposal from 54 MPs (primarily from PSRM) to instead nominate Mariana Durleșteanu, a former Moldovan ambassador to the United Kingdom. Sandu refused the proposal of the Constitutional Court and Parliament, saying, "I have said repeatedly that the only way for Moldova to move forward is to organise new parliamentary elections."

Before the Gavrilița Government could be voted on, some PSRM deputies presented a list signed by PSRM, Pentru Moldova (including the Șor Party), and another 3 unaffiliated MPs for supporting the candidature of Mariana Durleșteanu. Sandu declared afterwards that she would not continue consultations, but would not nominate another candidate for Prime Minister. Two options remained: snap elections or a referendum for Sandu's impeachment. On 16 March, she again met with parties in the Parliament for consultations. The PSRM delegation was led by Igor Dodon, the president of the party, but not a deputy in the Parliament. At the same time, without Dodon's knowledge, Durleșteanu announced that she was withdrawing her candidature. After the consultations, Sandu announced that it was impossible to form a parliamentary majority, and in order to end the political crisis, she nominated Igor Grosu as Prime Minister.

More political figures, such as Pavel Filip and Andrian Candu claimed that Sandu had reached an agreement with Igor Dodon in order to hold early parliamentary elections. Some political analysts stated that the withdrawal of Durleșteanu was planned in order to get closer to snap elections.

On 25 March, Parliament did not vote for Grosu, and the majority of the deputies left the building. Sandu had consultations with all parliamentary forces on 26 and 29 March. After the Constitutional Court declared the state of emergency unconstitutional, she dissolved the Parliament and called for an early snap parliamentary election on 11 July.

The 2021 Moldovan parliamentary elections ended in a victory for Sandu's Party of Action and Solidarity, winning 52.8% of the overall vote. The Constitutional Court of Moldova recognised the election results on 23 July.

The 2025 Moldovan parliamentary elections again returned the PAS to a majority government after winning 50.2% of the vote.

==== COVID-19 ====
During the visit of President of Romania Klaus Iohannis, he promised Romania would donate 200,000 doses of the Pfizer–BioNTech COVID-19 vaccine to Moldova. On 16 January, Sandu said that Moldovan authorities would allow residents of Transnistria to be vaccinated with the Russian Sputnik V COVID-19 vaccine. The first 21,600 doses of the Oxford–AstraZeneca COVID-19 vaccine promised by Romania arrived in Moldova on 28 February, with the first administrations on 2 March. Romania subsequently made more donations on 27 March 2021 with 50,400 vaccine units; on 17 April 2021 with 132,000 vaccine doses, fulfilling its promise to Moldova; and on 7 May 2021 with 100,800 vaccine units even though this surpassed the promised 200,000 vaccine doses. Moldova became the first country in Europe that received vaccines from the COVAX platform. The first shipment delivered in early March arrived with more than 14,000 doses of Oxford–AstraZeneca vaccine.

Sandu received her vaccination on 7 May with the Oxford–AstraZeneca vaccine after Romania stated its intention to donate thousands of vaccines to Moldova. Sandu had previously stated she would only receive vaccination when it was certain Moldova would have enough vaccines to vaccinate its entire population.

According to the World Health Organization, between 3 January 2020 and 28 June 2023, there have been 620,717 confirmed cases of COVID-19 with 12,124 deaths. As of 11 June 2023, a total of 2,288,948 vaccine doses have been administered. Moldova is among the first countries in the WHO European Region to conduct a COVID-19 intra-action review (IAR) upon the request of Moldova's Ministry of Health, Labour and Social Protection.

==== Supreme Security Council ====
In mid-January 2021, Sandu announced that the Supreme Security Council would be reorganised. On 21 January 2021, human rights activist Ana Revenco was appointed Secretary of the Supreme Security Council and concurrently adviser to Sandu in the field of defence and national security. Revenco's predecessor in these posts, Defense Minister Victor Gaiciuc, remained a member of the Security Council. The renewed Security Council did not include the Minister of Justice Fadei Nagacevschi, the Governor of Gagauzia Irina Vlah, or the director of the National Centre for Combating Corruption Ruslan Flocha. Nagacevschi, commenting on this situation, said: "I am glad that I was inconvenient". Former President Dodon declared the Supreme Security Council to be a threat to national security. His political opponent, former Prime Minister and leader of the Democratic Party Pavel Filip, was in solidarity with the ex-president, saying that "we are seeing double standards".

==== Dismissal of Octavian Armașu ====
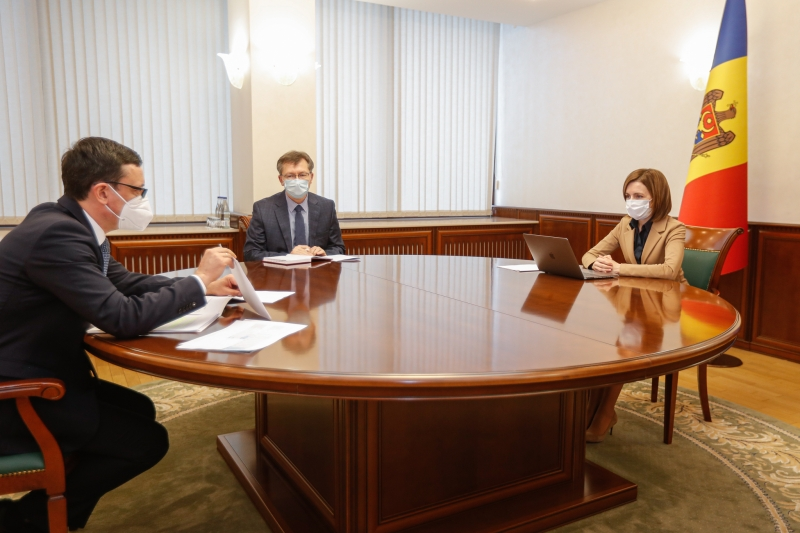
Sandu meeting with NBM governor Octavian Armașu, 23 March 2021

On 21 December 2023, Dodon's PSRM party joined Sandu's PAS party to secure a two-thirds majority for dismissing Octavian Armașu as governor of the National Bank of Moldova. In its June 2024 EU enlargement report, the European Commission described the dismissal as "sudden and unexpected" and expressed concern that the procedure, fell short of international best practices, underscoring potential risks to good governance and central bank independence. The decision was also scrutinised by the International Monetary Fund (IMF), referring to it as abrupt and course for concern over the political independence of the national bank.

==== Anti-corruption ====
Implementing anti-corruption measures was one of the central policies of Sandu's presidential election campaign and of her Party of Action and Solidarity. Since 2020, Moldova's CPI (Corruption Perceptions Index) has improved from 32 points to 39, ranking 91/180 among Eastern European and Central Asian countries. Transparency International cautioned in 2022 that "despite some progress in improving technical compliance with recommendations from the Group of States against Corruption and other bodies, much remains to be done to overcome the legacy of state capture still visible in many organs of state." They nevertheless praised efforts made under Sandu's presidency, and concluded that "the election of PAS, which ran above all on an anti-corruption platform, can be interpretated as a positive sign for this change as there is a widespread consensus among the population that corruption needs to be curbed."

Reporters Without Borders improved Moldova's Press Freedom Index ranking from 89th in 2020 to 28th in 2023, while cautioning that "Moldova's media are diverse but extremely polarised, like the country itself, which is marked by political instability and excessive influence by oligarchs." In 2022 the European Union's anti-money laundering body MONEYVAL upgraded Moldova from 'partially compliant' to 'largely compliant' due to significant improvements in the country's legal measures to prevent money laundering and terrorist financing.

On 8 June 2021, Sandu signed off on the creation of an extra-governmental corruption monitoring body after declaring the state's own institutions "too slow". The six-member panel of the 'Anticorruption Independent Consultative Committee' will be co-chaired by United States diplomat James Wasserstrom, includes economists, jurists and journalists and is partially funded by the European Union and United States.

On 5 October 2021, the Moldovan government suspended the Prosecutor General Alexandru Stoianoglo in relation to charges of corruption, passive corruption, illicit enrichment, and abuse of office in favour of criminal groups. The European Court of Human Rights later ruled that Stoianoglo's right to a fair trial had been violated. A Moldovan court cleared him of one of the accusations, with four other cases awaiting trial as of October 2024.

On 2 May 2022, former Moldovan Prime Minister Iurie Leancă was charged with abuse of power over a concession that gave control of the country's main airport to a businessman now in exile. The 2013 concession handed control of Chişinău International Airport for a 49-year term to a company associated with politician and businessman Ilan Shor, who fled Moldova in 2019 after the election of pro-Western Sandu. An appeals court ruled in November 2021 that control of the airport should return to the state. Veronica Dragalin, head of Moldova's anti-corruption prosecution office, said a former economy minister and six other former officials also faced similar charges in a criminal case which she said had been referred to court.

On 24 May 2022, former president Igor Dodon was arrested by the Moldovan authorities on charges of corruption for the receipt of bribes, illegal financing of his political party, and high treason against Moldova through links to fugitive Moldovan politician Vlad Plahotniuc. He was placed under house arrest on 26 May in order to allow prosecutors to investigate the allegations further. He was released from house arrest on 18 November 2022 pending a court trial on all charges.

On 21 March 2023, Sandu announced the creation of a new Anti-Corruption Court which will be set up to try major corruption cases, as well as cases of crime within Moldova's judicial system, as part of a broader move to tackle endemic corruption in the country. As of 15 June, Sandu has continued to hold consultations and discussions with representatives on the text of the court's concept paper. Sandu has also expressed her support for the establishment of an international anti-corruption court.

Analysts argue that since Russia's invasion of Ukraine, Moldova has been "flooded" with Russian propaganda and disinformation. The United States has accused Russia of "deliberately stirring unrest" within Moldova, stating that intelligence showed "that actors, some connected with Russian intelligence, are seeking to stage and use protests in Moldova as a basis to foment an insurrection against Moldova's new pro-Western government." White House National Security Minister John Kirby stated that "As Moldova continues to integrate with Europe, we believe Russia is pursuing options to weaken the Moldovan government probably with the eventual goal of seeing a more Russian- friendly administration in the capital".

In 2023, Sandu announced the creation of an anti-propaganda centre to counter this disinformation and to improve the country's hybrid threat response capabilities.

On 19 June 2023, the pro-Russian Șor Party was banned by the Constitutional Court of Moldova after months of anti-government protests, which the Moldovan government said was an attempt to destabilise it. The court declared the party unconstitutional, with court chairman Nicolae Roșca citing "an article in the constitution stating that parties must through their activities uphold political pluralism, the rule of law and the territorial integrity of Moldova." The party was led by Ilan Shor, a fugitive businessman who fled to Israel in 2019 after being convicted of fraud and money-laundering and sentenced to 15 years in prison in absentia. Sandu welcomed the court's decision.

==== Climate change ====
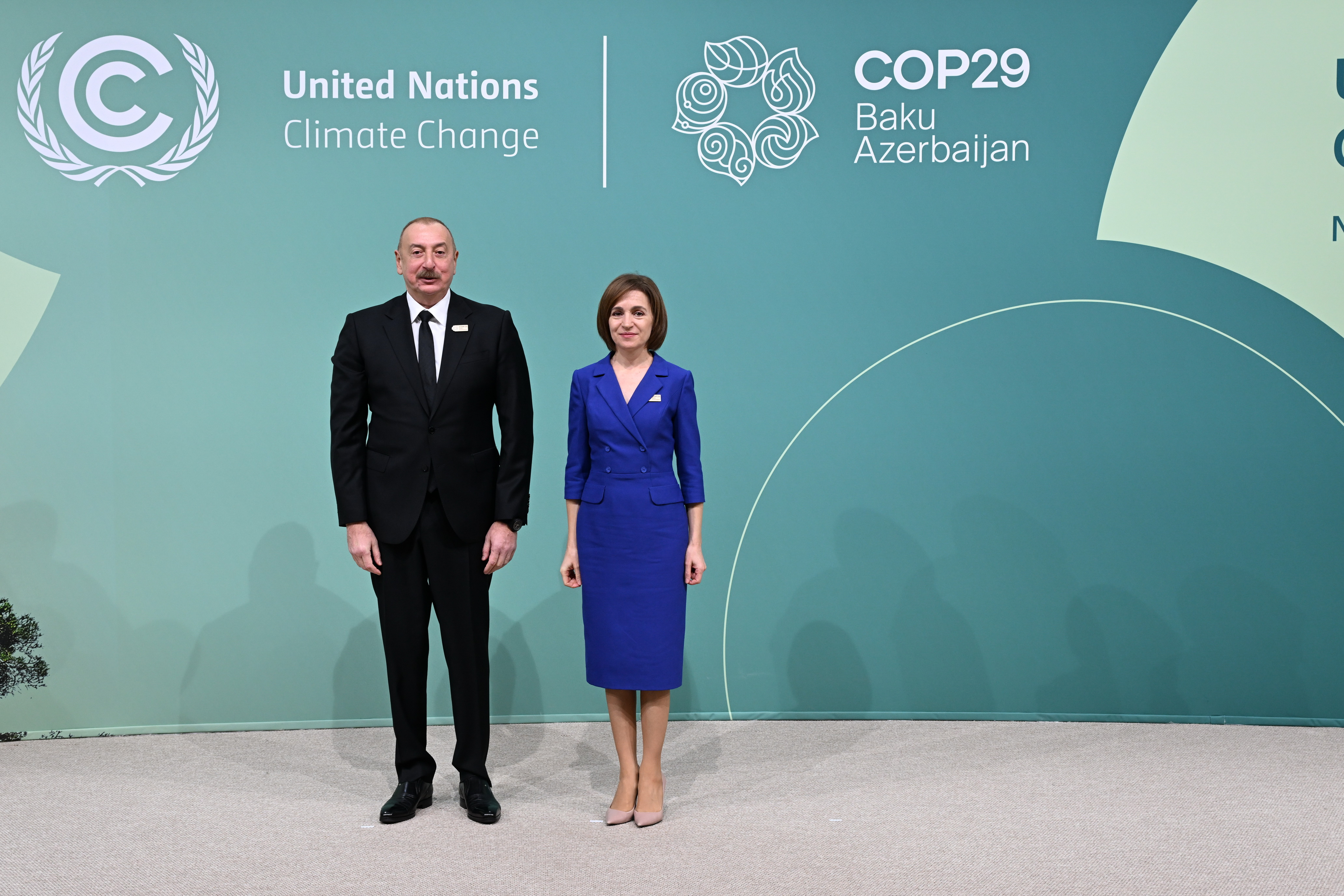
Sandu with Azerbaijan's President Ilham Aliyev at the COP29 climate conference in Baku, Azerbaijan, 12 November 2024

Moldova is highly vulnerable to climate change and related disasters, with an average annual economic loss of 2.13% GDP. Additionally, the country's unique biodiversity is currently threatened by climate change, habitat fragmentation and over-exploitation. Moldova is the European nation most vulnerable to the impacts of climate change. "In Moldova, 60 percent of the population doesn't have access to safe drinking water and droughts are becoming more and more frequent. According to the United Nations, the country suffered eleven droughts between 1990 and 2015, which had a significant impact on harvests. In 2012, the resulting losses amounted to €1 billion."

On 25 November 2022, Maia Sandu addressed the 76th Session of the United Nations General Assembly on the challenge of climate change. She announced that with assistance from United Nations Development Programme, they would be developing and setting out the commencement of a National Climate Change Adaptation Programme, with a focus on the specific risks and vulnerabilities induced by climate change, and the opportunities to respond to them. She highlighted that "For the Republic of Moldova, climate change means severe droughts every few years, floods, ruined crops and livelihoods of people."

The UNDP, Green Climate Fund, and Embassy of Sweden in Chișinău are assisting in developing a transition plan towards low-emission, green and climate-resilient development. She is quoted as saying, "climate change does not ask whether we are ready for it, whether we have the resources to respond to it, or whether it has come at the right time. Adapting to these changes will be hard. Building resilience will be difficult. Especially for us, because we have fewer resources, we are less prepared, and we have weaker institutions. But we have no choice, we must adapt. To resist. For our future and that of our children, here in Moldova."

According to the UNDP, "A special focus is placed on exploring the mitigation potential through promotion of renewable energy solutions, which currently is standing at 25,06% in the total energy mix, energy efficiency measures and resource efficiency production and consumption. At the same time, support to the reform and modernization of environmental management systems conducive to green development and EU standards are being provided."

==== Transnistria ====
Sandu has expressed her view that Operational Group of Russian Forces (OGRF) should withdraw from the breakaway region of Transnistria, saying to RBK TV that, although they guard ammunition depots, "there are no bilateral agreements on the OGRF and on the weapons depots". She also stated that it's her position that the "mission should be transformed into an OSCE civilian observer mission".

In September 2021, during an interview at a local television station, Sandu was asked to describe the events that took place in 1992 and led to the Transnistria War, to which she replied:

During the process through which we were trying to gain our independence, to become independent state, obviously foreign forces opposing our wish came to stop us, trying to create this danger. Things, obviously, have been planned from before, because if we look back in history that is how things have been arranged and organized so that we would always be dependent on the former USSR.

She further explained that the Transnistria conflict was an artificial problem created in order to stop Moldova from gaining its independence and that other former Soviet countries experienced the same thing. Sandu also stated that Moldova is looking exclusively for a peaceful and diplomatic solution in the conflict.

Asked about her position on opinions which suggest that Moldova should recognise the independence of Transnistria due to the conflict's role in delaying Moldova's EU integration, Sandu replied that she totally disagrees with such opinions.

In May 2026, President Vladimir Putin signed a decree facilitating the process for residents of Transnistria over the age of 18 to obtain Russian citizenship, allowing them to skip proving proficiency in the Russian language and the five-year Russian residency requirement for naturalisation cases. Sandu decried Putin's decree and asked citizens of Transnistria to "think twice," arguing that Russia "probably need(s) more people to send to the war in Ukraine."

=== Foreign policy ===
==== European Union and the West ====
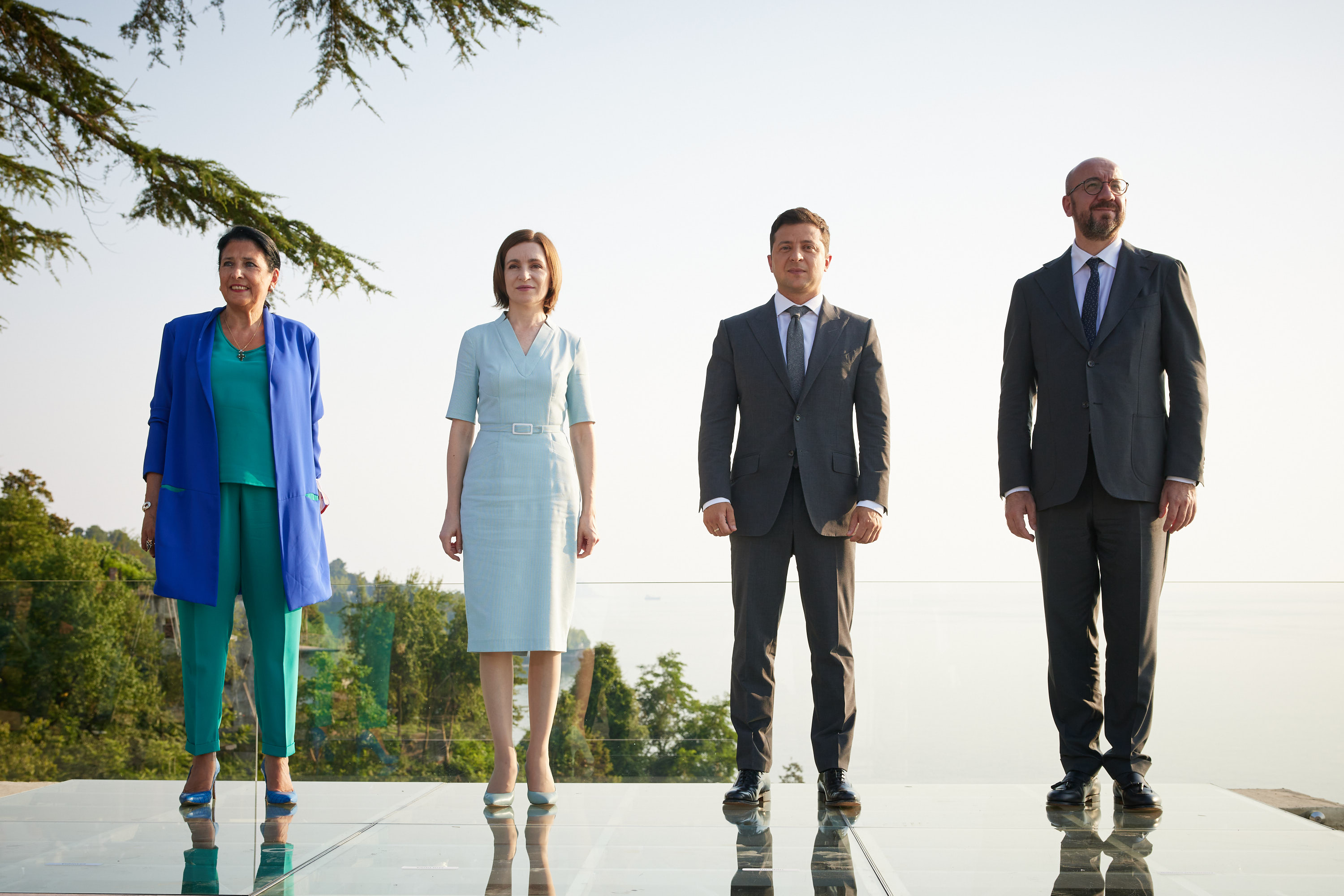
Salomé Zourabichvili, Maia Sandu (second left), Volodymyr Zelenskyy and Charles Michel at the 2021 Batumi International Conference

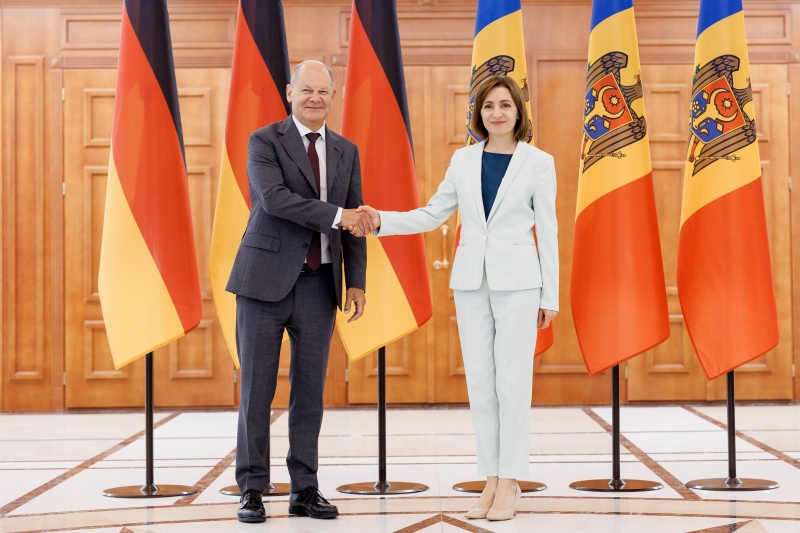
Sandu meets with German Chancellor Olaf Scholz in Chișinău, 21 August 2024.

Sandu is a supporter of Moldova's European integration, the country's entry into the European Union, and the resumption of cooperation with the IMF. When she received the president of Romania, she declared that "the Republic will integrate into the European space with the help of Romania". Maia Sandu met EU and Belgian political figures in Brussels in January 2021.

On 19 April 2021 in Strasbourg, France, she signed the Council of Europe Action Plan for the Republic of Moldova 2021–2024, an action plan of the Council of Europe with the aim of reforming Moldova's legislation and state institutions and introducing improvements on the country's democracy, human rights, and rule of law.

After the outbreak of the 2022 Russian invasion in Ukraine, Sandu signed the application for EU membership on 3 March 2022, together with Igor Grosu, the president of the Moldovan parliament, and Natalia Gavrilița, the country's prime minister.

Sandu actively campaigned for the 'Yes' vote supporting European integration in the 2024 Moldovan European Union membership constitutional referendum held on the same day as the first round of the 2024 presidential election on 20 October, which won by a narrow margin. Sandu attributed the result to an "unprecedented assault on our country's freedom and democracy" following allegations of interference by "criminal groups" and pro-Russian interests.

==== Romania ====
Romanian President Klaus Iohannis became the first foreign leader to visit Sandu in Moldova, arriving on 29 December. As part of the Moldovan–Romanian collaboration during the COVID-19 pandemic, Iohannis promised that Romania would aid Moldova with medicines, medical and sanitary protection equipment and 200,000 vaccine units. When going to Paris, in a stopover in Bucharest, she met with the Prime Minister of Romania, Florin Cîțu.

Furthermore, when asked about how she would vote in case there was a referendum on the unification of Moldova and Romania, Sandu replied that she would personally vote "yes".

==== Ukraine ====
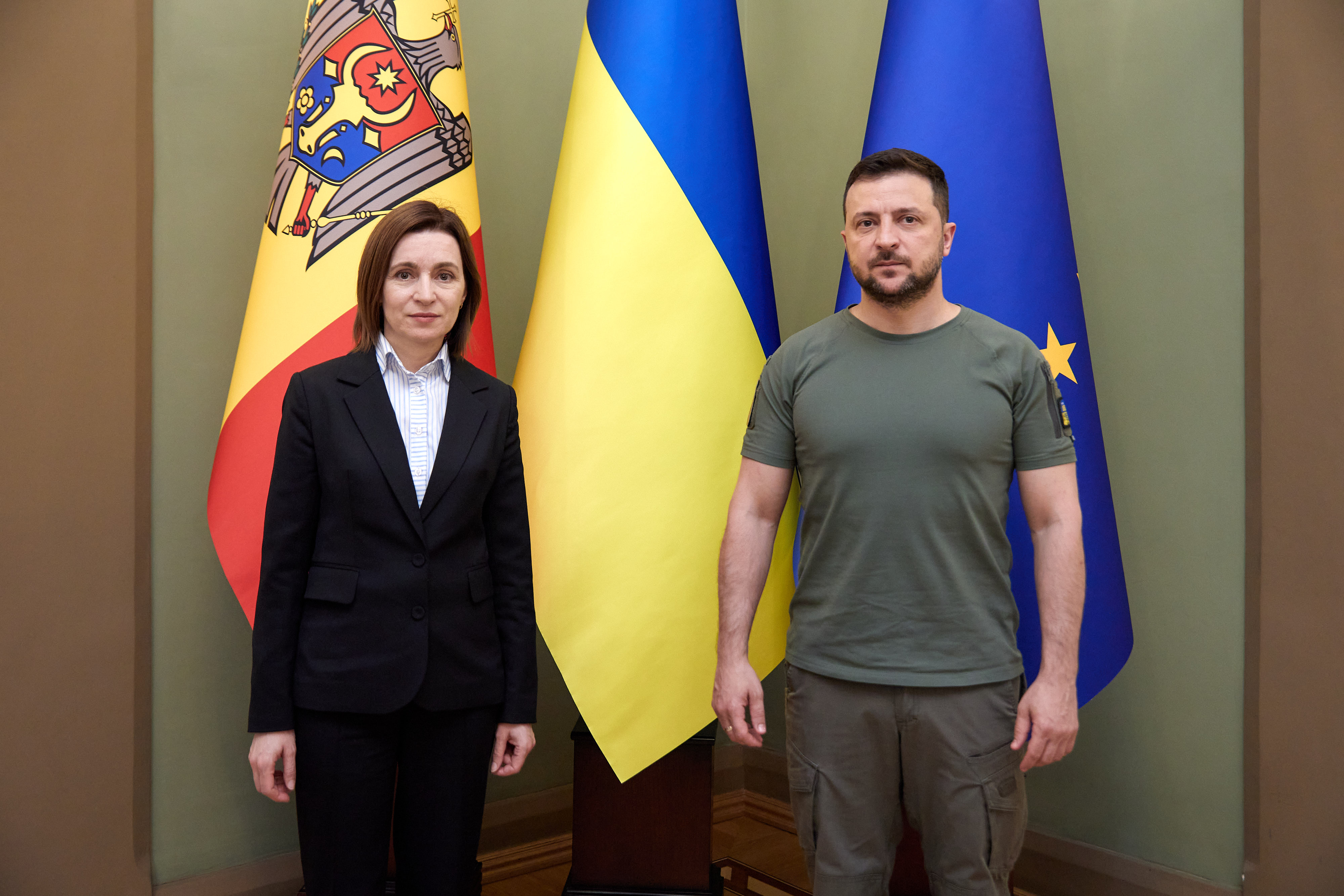
Sandu meets with Ukrainian President Volodymyr Zelenskyy in Kyiv, 27 June 2022.

In a meeting with Ukrainian Foreign Minister Dmytro Kuleba, she confirmed that a visit to Kyiv in January 2021 would become the first foreign trip she will take as president. During her visit on 12 January, she met with President of Ukraine Volodymyr Zelenskyy, where they agreed to create a Presidential Council to address issues of bilateral relations. She also met with prime minister Denys Shmyhal and parliament speaker Dmytro Razumkov. She paid tribute to fallen Ukrainians at the Tomb of the Unknown Soldier and the National Museum of the Holodomor-Genocide.

On 24 February 2022, Moldova announced it was closing its airspace because of the Russian invasion of Ukraine. Shortly after President Sandu condemned the act of war by Russia against Ukraine, saying, "a blatant breach of international law and of Ukrainian sovereignty and territorial integrity." She added that Moldova was ready to accept tens of thousands of people fleeing Ukraine after the Russian attack and vowed to keep the borders open to help, saying, "we will help people who need our help and support." As of 6 March over 100,000 Ukrainian citizens had crossed the border into Moldova.

==== Russia ====
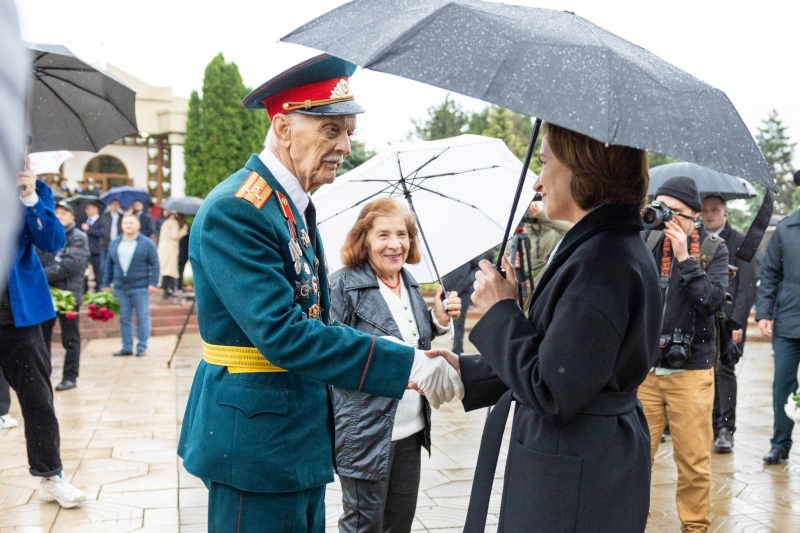
Maia Sandu celebrating the Soviet Victory Day with a veteran of the Red Army at the Eternity Memorial Complex, Chișinău (9 May 2025)

In an interview on TV8, Sandu declared that she is "ready to go to Russia" to discuss issues "concerning trade, exports, settlement of the Transnistria conflict" and others. She also noted that she intends to visit Kyiv and Brussels before going to Moscow, highlighting her more pro-EU stance. On 11 August 2021, Sandu, alongside other officials, met with Dmitry Kozak, the Deputy Kremlin Chief of Staff, where they agreed to lift all economic barriers between the two nations and look into the removal of ammunition depots from Transnistria.

In February 2023, Sandu stated that Moscow had sought to overthrow her country's government, echoing accusations made by Ukraine's president Volodymyr Zelenskyy. Sandu alleged details of Russia's plan of trying to orchestrate violent attacks in Moldova to overthrow the government and institute a government that would be more friendly to Russia and derail the plans to join the European Union. The pro-Russian Șor Party was dissolved and banned by Moldova's Constitutional Court in June 2023.

In September 2025, an investigation by the BBC revealed a secret Russian-backed network trying to disrupt the 2025 Moldovan parliamentary elections. According to the BBC, sanctioned Russian groups recruited operatives on Telegram, then trained them to spread fake news. They posted pro Russian content, attacked the pro EU ruling party, and ran fake polls to question the results. The operation, linked to fugitive oligarch Ilan Shor and the banned NGO Evrazia, reached millions on TikTok and Facebook. Recruits used ChatGPT to create false content after filming opposition supporters. The investigation claims the funding comes from Moscow and is part of wider Kremlin efforts to destabillise Moldova.

On 8 April 2026, Sandu promulgated a law withdrawing Moldova from the Commonwealth of Independent States.

== Personal life ==
Sandu is unmarried and has no children, lives in an apartment in Chișinău, and used to own a Toyota RAV4 as means of transportation. She briefly considered adopting a child. In addition to her native Romanian, she is fluent in English and Russian.

Sandu is a dual Moldovan and Romanian citizen.

== Electoral results ==
=== Parliamentary ===
Election	Party	Votes	Percentage	Position
2019 (50th Constituency)	ACUM Electoral Bloc (DA and PAS)	380,181	26.84%	2nd

=== Presidential ===
Election	Party	First round			Second round		
Election	Party	Votes	Percentage	Position	Votes	Percentage	Position
2016	Party of Action and Solidarity (PAS)	549,152	38.71%	2nd	766,593	47.89%	2nd
2020	Party of Action and Solidarity (PAS)	439,866	36.16%	1st	943,006	57.72%	1st
2024	Party of Action and Solidarity (PAS)	656,354	42.45%	1st	930,238	55.35%	1st

== Honours and awards ==
=== Honors ===
- Moldova:
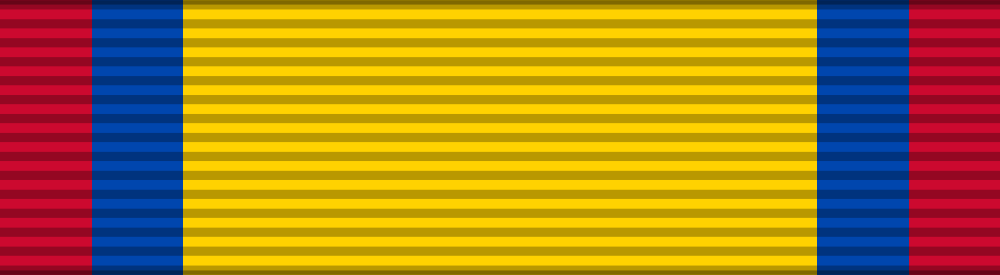
  - Order of Work Glory (23 July 2014)
- Ukraine:
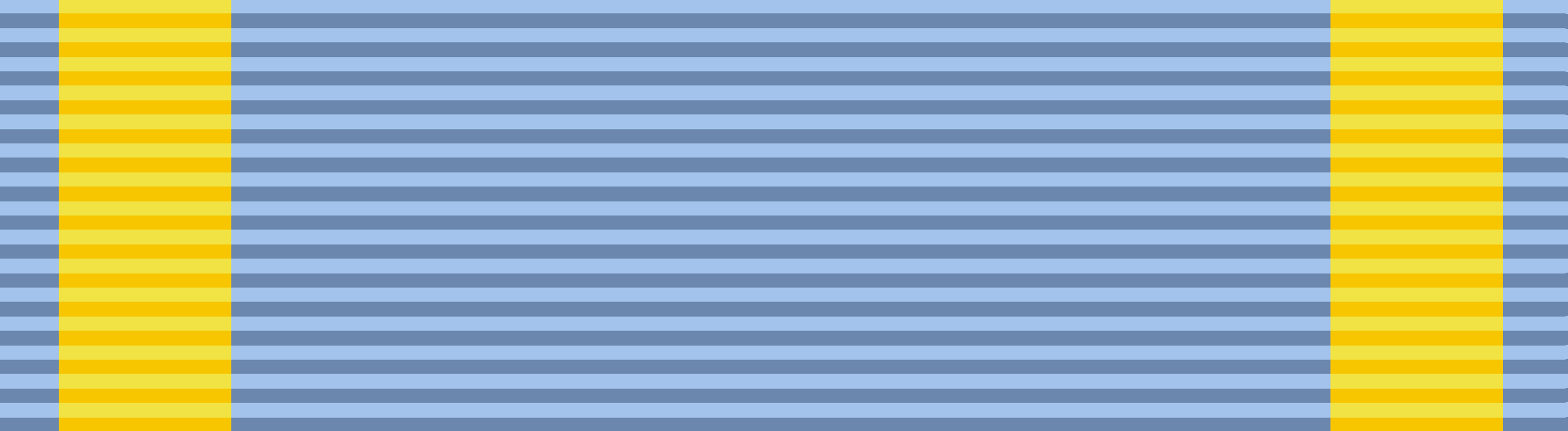
  - First Class of the Order of Prince Yaroslav the Wise (23 August 2021)
  - First Class of the Order of Princess Olga (24 August 2026)
- Lithuania:
  - First Class of the Order of Vytautas the Great (6 July 2022)
- France:
  - Grand Cross of the Legion of Honour (7 March 2024)
- European Union
  - Honourable Member European Order of Merit (19 May 2026)

=== Awards ===
- 2020 Award of the Group for Social Dialogue (Romania, 27 January 2021)
- 2026 GLOBSEC price award (Prague, Czechia, 21 May 2026)

== See also ==
- List of current heads of state and government
- List of heads of the executive by approval rating

Political offices
Preceded by Pavel Filip	Prime Minister of Moldova; 2019	Succeeded by Ion Chicu
Preceded by Igor Dodon	President of Moldova; 2020–present	Incumbent
