= Council of Europe Action Plan for the Republic of Moldova 2021–2024 =

Action plan of the Council of Europe for reforms in Moldova from 2021 to 2024

The Council of Europe Action Plan for the Republic of Moldova 2021–2024 (Romanian: Planul de Acțiuni al Consiliului Europei pentru Republica Moldova 2021–2024) was a strategic initiative of the Council of Europe (CoE) and the Moldovan authorities with the aim of improving the legislation and state institutions of Moldova and applying reforms on the issues of democracy, human rights and the rule of law in the country in accordance with common European practices, such as the implementation of the European Convention on Human Rights. It was signed in Strasbourg, France, on 19 April 2021, in the presence of the President of Moldova Maia Sandu and the Secretary General of the Council of Europe Marija Pejčinović Burić. This action plan lasted from 2021 to 2024 and had a price of 13.65 to 13.70 million euros at the time of its signing. The Council of Europe had already adopted this action plan on 26 November 2020. The 2021–2024 Action Plan for Moldova was only the third one of the Council of Europe for the country, with previous action plans having been implemented on 2013–2016 and 2017–2020.

Before the formal signing of the action plan, Sandu and Burić discussed at a meeting about the situation of human rights in the breakaway Moldovan region of Transnistria, the future of Moldovan politics and Sandu's mandate and the situation of the COVID-19 pandemic in Moldova. Sandu also thanked Burić for the support provided by the Council of Europe to Moldova for years to help it become a functional democratic state, while Burić expressed her support for Moldova's anti-corruption policies, which she described as fundamental. Some of the first projects of the Council of Europe financed by the action plan were announced on 22 April 2021. These are two, and are called "Strengthening the prison and probation reforms, provision of health care and the treatment of patients in closed institutions in the Republic of Moldova" ("SPPRH Project") and "Strengthening the human rights compliant criminal justice system in the Republic of Moldova" ("SHRCCJ Project"), with a duration of 36 and 30 months respectively.
