= Risipeni =

Village in Moldova

- Commune
- Location in Moldova
- Coordinates: 47°27′36″N 27°39′58″E
- Country: Moldova
- District: Fălești District

Population (2014)
  - Total: 1,913
- Time zone: UTC+2 (EET)
  - Summer (DST): UTC+3 (EEST)

Risipeni is a village in Fălești District, Moldova with two constituent villages, Bocșa and Risipeni.

== Notable people ==
- Diomid Gherman, Moldovan researcher and professor;
- Maia Sandu, Moldovan economist, Minister of Education (2012–2015), Prime Minister (2019) and President of Moldova (2020–current).
