= Ministry of Defence (Transnistria) =

Ministry of Defence of Transnistria
- Emblem of the armed forces
- Formation: 6 September 1991; 35 years ago
- Headquarters: Tiraspol
- Location: Transnistria
- Official language: Russian
- Minister of Defence: Lieutenant General Oleg Obruchkov

The Ministry of Defence of Transnistria (Russian: Министерство обороны Приднестровской Молдавской Республики) is a government agency of the partially recognized Pridnestrovian Moldavian Republic. It is the executive body in implementing defence policies in of the Armed Forces of Transnistria. The current Minister of Defence is Lieutenant General Oleg Obruchkov.

== Tasks ==
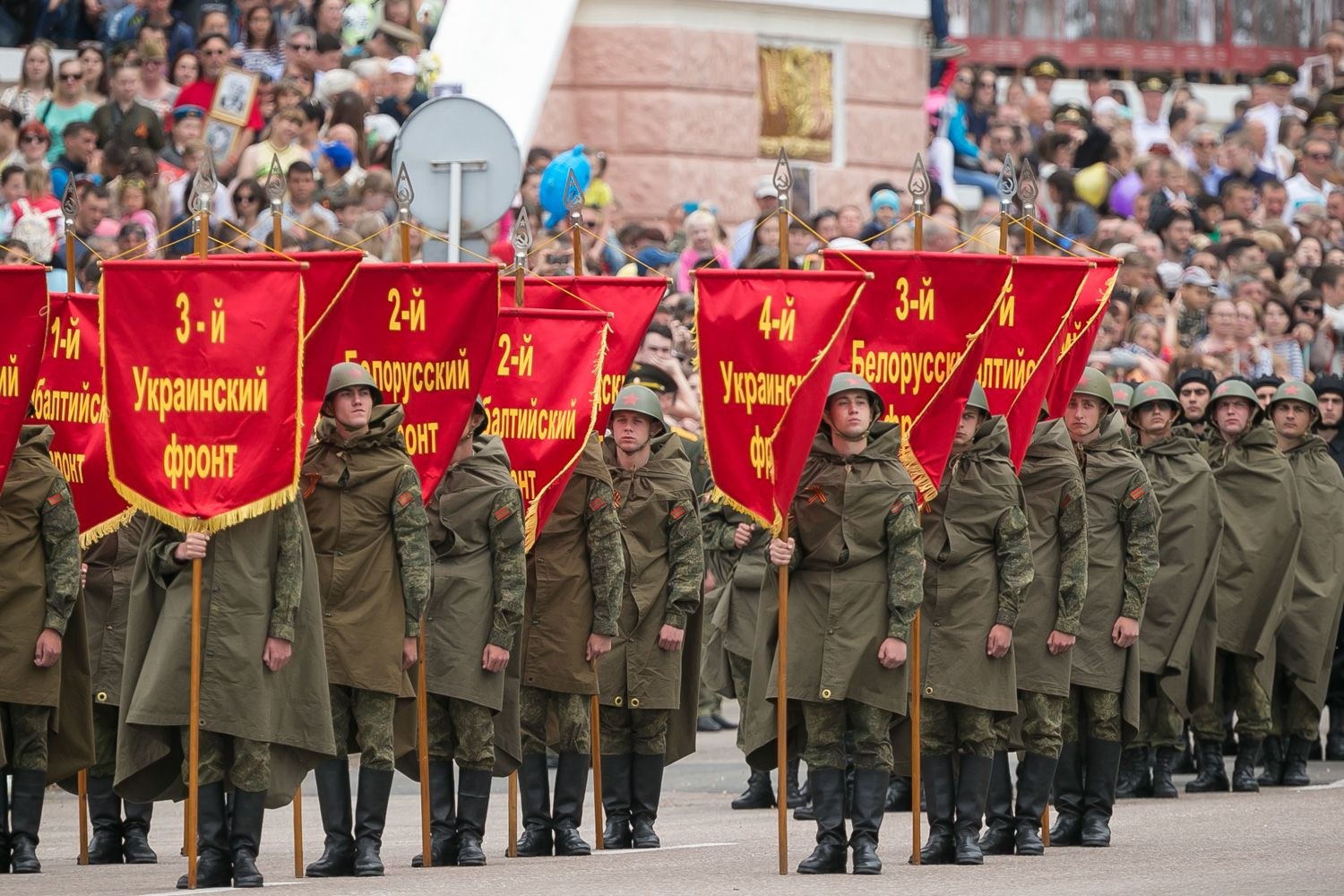
Cadets of the Military Institute of the Ministry of Defence.

- To implement state policy on defence and military development
- To coordinate the activities of state bodies and local self-government bodies from the preparation of the state for defence
- To ensure the combat readiness, and capability of the armed forces to perform their functions and tasks
- To interact with state bodies, public organizations and citizens, international organizations to provide training and education in the military

== History ==
On September 6, 1991, a year after the formation of the PMR, the Supreme Soviet adopted a decree "On measures to protect the sovereignty and independence of the republic", which determined the creation of the Republican Guard. On September 3, 1992, the Supreme Council approved a concept by the military agencies and organizations. By the end of 1992, all the main structures within the defence ministry were formed, including departments, units and subunits. On March 14, 1993, the entire staff of the defence ministry took an oath of allegiance to the country. The professional holiday of the ministry is on 6 September, days after the Republic Day celebrations.

== Leadership ==
=== Minister of Defence ===
Minister of Defence of Transnistria
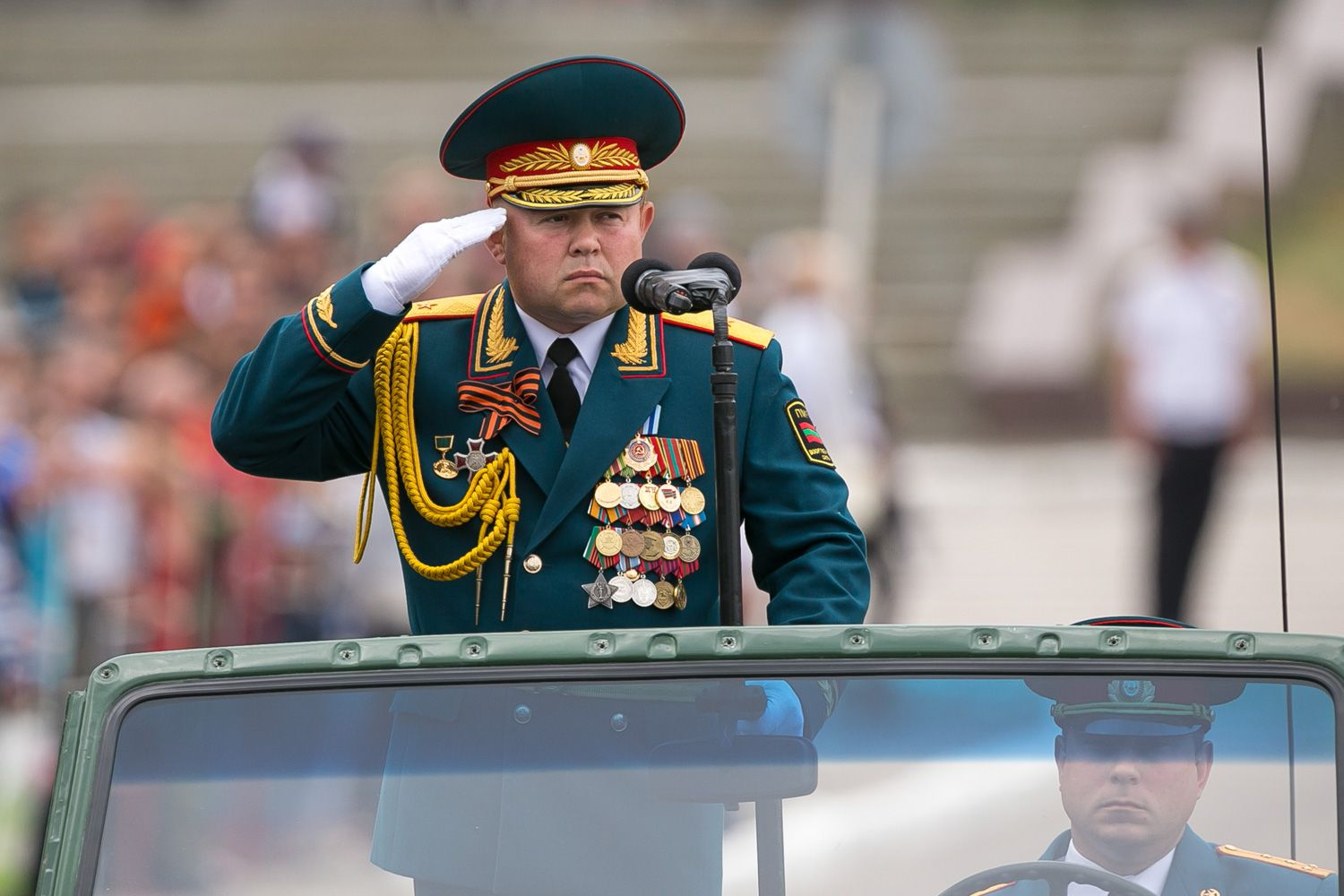
- Incumbent; Lieutenant General Oleg Obruchkov since 26 December 2016
- Appointer: President of Transnistria
- Formation: 1991
- First holder: Stefan Kitzac
- Deputy: Chief of the General Staff

The minister of defence is the executive minister responsible for the management of the ministry as well as the armed forces.

| No. | Portrait | Minister of Defence | Took office | Left office | Time in office | Ref. |
|---|---|---|---|---|---|---|
| 1 | Stefan Kitzac | Major general Stefan Kitzac | January 24, 2012 | September 1992 | 1 year | - |
| 2 | Stanislav Hazheev | Colonel General; Stanislav Hazheev (born 1941) | September 1992 | January 24, 2012 | 19 years, 4 months | |
| 3 | Alexander Lukyanenko | Major General; Alexander Lukyanenko (born 1961) | January 24, 2012 | December 30, 2015 | 3 years, 11 months | - |
| 4 | Oleg Gomenyuk | Major General; Oleg Gomenyuk | December 30, 2015 | August 18, 2016 | 8 months | - |
| 5 | Ruslan Paulesko | Major General; Ruslan Paulesko | August 18, 2016 | December 26, 2016 | 3 months | - |
| 6 | Oleg Obruchkov | Lieutenant general Oleg Obruchkov | December 26, 2016 | Incumbent | 9 years, 10 months | |

== See also ==
- Armed Forces of Transnistria
- Operational Group of Russian Forces
- Joint Control Commission
- Transnistria War
- Ministry of Internal Affairs (Transnistria)
  - Law enforcement in Transnistria
  - Crime in Transnistria
- Ministry of State Security (Transnistria)
