= Diomid Gherman =

Moldovan physician

Diomid Gherman OR
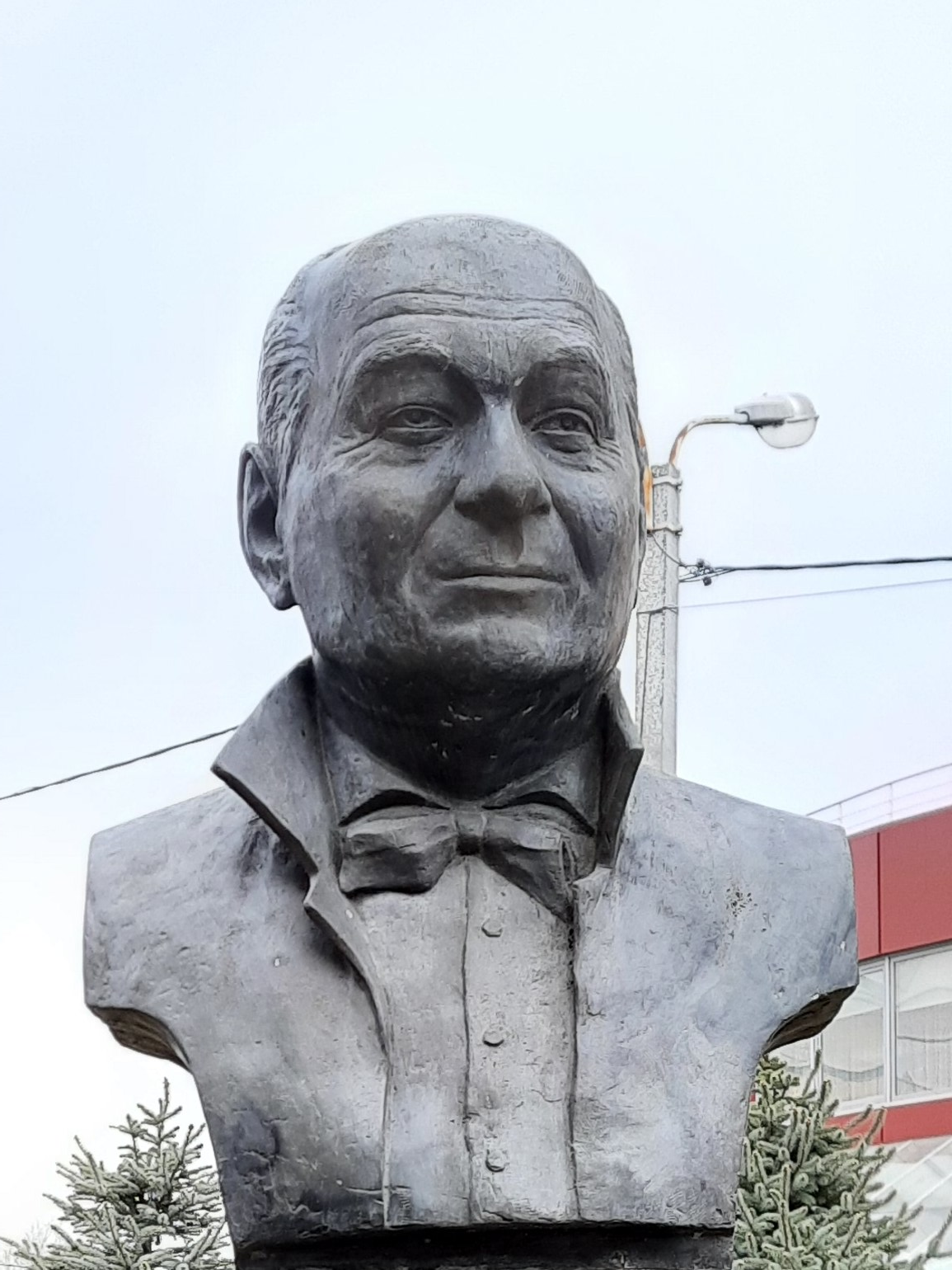
- Bust of Gherman in Chișinău
- Born: April 10, 1928; Bocșa, Kingdom of Romania
- Died: April 19, 2014; Chișinău, Moldova
- Occupation: Professor
- Parent: Grigore Gherman
- Awards: Om emerit al Republicii Moldova (1984)

Diomid Gherman (10 April 1928 – 19 April 2014) was a professor and researcher from Moldova and a corresponding member of the Academy of Sciences of Moldova. He was a leader of the Democratic Forum of the Romanians of Moldova.

== Biography ==
Gherman was born on April 10, 1928, in the village Bocșa, Fălești district, in a family of teachers. After graduating the school of his village, he continued his studies at Commercial High School, then at General School no. 1 in Bălți, which he graduated in 1946. Between 1946 and 1951 he studied at the State Medical Institute in Chișinău. After graduating from the institute, he became head physician at the Chirileni village Hospital of Ungheni district (1951–1952). In 1952, he was admitted to clinical neurology at the Department of Neurology. Consecutively, he served as the Head of Hospital of Congaz District (1954–1956), Inspector of the Ministry of Health and Chairman of the Central Committee of the Red Cross in Moldova.

In 1962, Gherman received a Postgraduate diploma in medical sciences, and a decade later - a PhD. In 1961, Gherman was an assistant, then lecturer at the Department of Neurology. In 1973, he obtained his professorship. During 1969–1998, Gherman was head of the Department of Neurology of the State University of Medicine and Pharmacy "Nicolae Testemitanu". Later, he worked as a university professor at the same university and as a senior collaborator in the Vertebra-neurology Laboratory of the Institute of Neurology and Neurosurgery. In 1993, Gherman was elected to the Academy of Sciences of Moldova. Gherman is the founder of the National School of Neurology and Neurosurgery.

Gherman taught for over 55 years. His research in the field of neurology has been included in about 400 publications, including 12 journals.

Gherman promoted home neurologya at the international level. Since 1989, he organized 12 scientific meetings of neurologists and neurosurgeons from the Republic of Moldova and România. Gherman was honored with the titles of emeritus Scholar of RM, the State Award, the Man of the Year and the Citizen of Honor of Falești town. The high school in his native village was named after him. Gherman died on April 19, 2014.

== Awards ==
- Emeritus of the Republic of Moldova (1984),
- titular member of the Academy of Sciences of Moldova (1993),
- member of the Euro-Asian Academy of Sciences,
- honorary member of the Romanian Medical Academy (1994).
- "Scientist Emeritus from Moldovan SSR" (1984),
- "Civic Merit" (1995),
- order "Gloria Muncii" (1998), "For bravery in work", "Dimitrie Cantemir", "Nicolae Testemitanu",
- Laureate of the State Prize of the Republic of Moldova (1998)
- "Civic Merit" medal.
- A bust of the figure has been erected on the Alley of Distinguished Doctors and Scientists, next to the Chisinau University of Medicine and Pharmacy. It was created by Moldovan sculptor Veaceslav Jiglițchi.
