= Human rights in Transnistria =

The state of affairs with human rights in Transnistria has been criticized by several governments and international organizations. The Republic of Moldova, and other states and non-governmental organizations (NGOs) claim that the government of Transnistria is authoritarian and has a record of arbitrary arrest and torture.

With the stated aim of rectifying its human rights record and bringing it in line with European standards, Transnistria established an ombudsman's office in 2006.

The 2007 Freedom in the World report, published by the US-based Freedom House, described Transnistria as a "non-free" territory, having an equally poor record in both political rights and civil liberties.

== Overview ==
In July 2007 the European Parliament, in a decision without juridical power, condemned the “strict and frequent” violation of human rights by the Transnistrian separatist authorities. The European Parliament "deplores the lack of respect for human rights and human dignity in Transnistria" and "condemns the continued repression, harassment and intimidation of representatives of the independent media, NGOs and civil society".

According to a U.S. Department of State report referring to year 2006, "The right of citizens to change their government was restricted... Authorities reportedly continued to use torture and arbitrary arrest and detention.... In Transnistria authorities limited freedom of speech and of the press.... Authorities usually did not permit free assembly.... In the separatist region of Transnistria the authorities continued to deny registration and harassed a number of minority religions groups.... The separatist region remained a significant source and transit area for trafficking in persons.... Homosexuality was illegal, and gays and lesbians were subject to governmental and societal discrimination."

The Republic of Moldova accuses the PMR administration of organizing incursions into some of the left-bank villages controlled by the Moldovan government such as Vasilevca, which they claim also result in arbitrary arrests, beatings and sometimes even deaths.

Several alleged crimes by the paramilitary forces of the Transnistrian government remained uninvestigated. The chairman of the Moldovan Helsinki Committee for Human Rights claimed that 20 people were killed in the village of Chiţcani, 5 km south of Tiraspol, between 1996 and 2000. He said that no government authority investigated these deaths because Moldova has no access to the village and Transnistrian authorities do not wish to investigate.

According to a human rights report by the US Department of State, prisons in Transnistria are said to be harsh.

According to US Department of State human rights reports for 2003–2004 and 2005, the right of citizens to change their government is severely restricted; authorities reportedly continued to use torture and arbitrary arrest and detention. Transnistrian authorities harassed independent media and opposition lawmakers, restricted freedom of association and of religion, and discriminated against Romanian-speakers.

The police investigation into the July 2004 disappearance of Sergei Gavrilov, who was imprisoned in Transnistria during the early 1990s and allegedly witnessed the mistreatment of members of the "Ilascu Group", was not solved. Transnistrian authorities have regularly harassed and often detained persons suspected of being critical of the regime for periods of up to several months. For example, Transnistrian authorities detained for several hours and reportedly abused two brothers, aged 12 and 15, who were the sons of a teacher at one of the Latin script schools in Transnistria. The Transnistria militia had reportedly explained they had detained the boys to clean the city of homeless people before the December legislative elections.

== Situation of the media ==
According to Organization for Security and Co-operation in Europe (OSCE), the media climate in Transnistria is restrictive and the authorities continue a long-standing campaign to silence independent opposition voices and groups. Alternative viewpoints were stifled by widespread censorship

According to the same U.S. Department of State report for 2006, "Both of region's major newspapers were controlled by the authorities. There was one independent weekly newspaper in Bender and another in the northern city of Rîbniţa.... Separatist authorities harassed independent newspapers for critical reporting of the Transnistrian regime.... Most television and radio stations and print publication were controlled by Transnistrian authorities, which largely dictated their editorial policies and finance operations. Some broadcast networks, such as the TSV television station and the INTER-FM radio station, were owned by Transnistria's largest monopoly, Sherriff, which also holds a majority in the region's legislature.... In July 2005 the Transnistrian Supreme Soviet amended the election code to prohibit media controlled by the Transnistrian authorities from publishing results of polls and forecasts related to elections."

== Situation of Romanian-language schools ==
Transnistrian local authorities insist that public education for ethnic Moldovans in their mother tongue be done using the Soviet-originated Moldovan Cyrillic, and have restricted the usage of the Latin script for the Moldovan language to only six schools. Four schools of the six that taught the Moldovan language using Latin script were closed by the authorities, who claimed the schools refused to apply for official accreditation. The schools were later reopened amid pressure from the European Union, but as private institutions.

In 2010, the European Court of Human Rights declared partly admissible applications of more than 100 local residents regarding closing of three Moldovan schools in Transnistria (Tighina, Rîbniţa and Grigoriopol), alleging the violation of their right to protection of private life, education and non-discrimination.

The OSCE mission to Moldova urged local authorities in the Transnistrian city of Rîbniţa to return a confiscated building to the Moldovan Latin script school located in the city. The unfinished building was nearing completion in 2004, when Transnistria took control of it during that year's school crisis.

== Political prisoners ==
In early August 2019, a couple of pensioners and Cioburciu residents, Tatyana Belova and Sergei Mirovich, were arrested and sentenced to three years in prison for publicly insulting Vadim Krasnoselsky, then Transnistria's de facto president. The insults had reportedly been posted on social media. Moldovan news website NewsMaker later reported that Belova was released in July 2020 because she "admitted her guilt", which Mirovich would have refused to do. Krasnoselsky pardoned Mirovich on 29 December 2021. He was due to remain in prison until August 2022. Mirovich had at that time been on hunger strike for a month alongside Oleg Khorzhan, chairman of the Transnistrian Communist Party. Both men had been demanding, among other things, that the result of the 2021 Transnistrian presidential election not be recognised.

=== Ilie Ilașcu Group ===
One of the most high-profile cases involved Ilie Ilașcu, who was convicted in 1993 of killing two Transnistrian officials. He was initially sentenced to death by Transnistria's Supreme Court. This was commuted to a life prison sentence. Three other associates were sentenced to 12 to 15 years’ imprisonment and confiscation of their property.

Ilașcu was released in 2001, following a decision of the European Court of Human Rights (ECHR), while the other three were released in 2004 and 2007 when they finished serving their sentences.

In the case of Ilaşcu and Others v. Moldova and Russia (2004), the European Court of Human Rights found their detention arbitrary and did not recognize the sentence. It also demanded that Moldova and Russia release the other Ilie Ilașcu Group members, Andrei Ivanțoc and Tudor Petrov-Popa, at that time still imprisoned in Transnistria.

ECHR stated the authorities had broken the right of freedom and safety to all four members of the group, and that the treatment Ilie Ilașcu suffered qualified as torture. The court also ordered Moldova and Russia — which backs Transnistria — to pay the four a total of €750,000 (US$1,000,000) in compensation for the deprivation of their freedom, and for ill treatment while in custody.

== Religious groups ==
Some organizations claim that the right of free assembly or association is not fully respected and that religious freedom is limited by denying registration to Baptists, Methodists, and the Church of the Living God. Transnistrian authorities also reportedly accused Jehovah's Witnesses of lacking patriotism and spreading Western influence, and developed school teaching aids along those lines containing negative and defamatory information regarding Jehovah's Witnesses. In 2007, the US-based Christian Broadcasting Network denounced Transnistrian KGB persecution of Protestants.

== Profanation of military cemetery ==
According to the Moldavian and Romanian press, in February 2007, Transnistrian authorities destroyed and profaned the Drăgalina cemetery in Tighina (also known as the Romanian cemetery, which contains/contained the tombs of many World War II soldiers), thus violating Articles 34 and 130 of the 4th Geneva Convention. The Transnistrian authorities did not exhume the bodies but removed the crosses and leveled the terrain with bulldozers.

According to the Romanian edition of Deutsche Welle, the Transnistrian authorities announced that the crosses would be blown up and mixed with asphalt to repair the roads of the city. According to PMR News, the authorities in Transnistria are to rebury the exhumed soldiers outside of the city and authorities have taken steps so that the identities of these exhumed soldiers are not lost. No such steps have been taken to date and locals have reported bones being moved with bulldozers. A monument to Soviet soldiers was proposed to be built over the leveled graves. According to the official Transnistrian press, "Memorials dedicated to glory and monuments play an important role in the education of the young generation."

The cemetery was founded in 1812, when the graves of Swedish and Russian soldiers that died near the Tighina Fortress in 1709 were relocated. In the 19th century, several leaders of Don Cossacks, local boyars and city councilmen were buried in the cemetery. During World War II, Romanian (the majority of the graves), German and Soviet soldiers, and Soviet POWs were buried there. Soviet graves are located in one part of the cemetery, called Borisovskoe, while the 333 Romanian graves were located in the now destroyed part, called Drăgalina. 319 identified Romanian and 14 unidentified soldiers, as well as 13 Soviet prisoners were buried at this cemetery.

== 2007—2010 ==
In March 2007, several opponents of Transnistrian regime were arrested as they made public appeals for a protest rally against the Tiraspol regime's policy. On March 19, 2007, Transnistrian authorities also arrested Ştefan Urîtu, the head of the Moldovan Helsinki Committee for Human Rights, and two of his aides, despite the fact that Urîtu has a residence in Transnistria They were later released.

Transnistrian residents with automobiles registered in Moldova have seen their cars confiscated by Transnistrian authorities.

During the Moldovan municipal elections on June 3, 2007, the Transnistrian authorities prevented the inhabitants of Corjova, a village in the security zone under the administrative control of Chişinău, from participating in the elections. A local councillor, Iurie Cotofana, was arrested and beaten badly enough to require hospitalization. Corjova's mayor, Valeriu Miţul, - who was up for re-election - received death threats. Valentin Besleag, a candidate for Corjova's mayoral office was also arrested.

In April 2010 the journalist Ernest Vardanean was arrested, being accused of espionage in favour of Moldova.

A similar case was that of Ilie Cazacu from Bender, arrested on 19 March 2010 for high treason and espionage in favour of Moldova. As the parents of Ilie Cazacu did not receive news about him, they started in June 2010 a hunger strike in front of the Russian Embassy in Chişinău. On 31 October 2011 Ilie Cazacu was pardoned by President Smirnov and released.

On 18 June 2010 Moldovan human rights organization Promo-Lex accused authorities of Transnistria in detaining Elena Dobroviţcaia from Bender, who was arrested allegedly because her mother went to a hospital in Chişinău instead of presenting herself at the request of the authorities from Bender. Attempts were made by Moldova's mass media to connect this situation with case of Ilie Cazacu. On 2 July 2010 Ministry of Interior of Transnistria published refutation, stating that Elena Dobroviţcaia was detained in temporary detention facility for 72 hours because during search at her flat 40 thousands rubles were found, probably belonging to her mother who was accused in fraud and theft. According to Ministry of Interior Elena was released after 72 hours of detainment.

== Restriction on the redress for violation of human rights ==
The Criminal Code of Transnistria criminalises the denial of the 'positive role' of the peacekeeping mission of the Russian Federation in the Pridnestrovian Republic under Article 278-3 through the use of public actions, statements, or use of media, information, telecommunication networks by a fine of 500-1000 roubles or a term of imprisonment of up to three years. Likewise the publication of propaganda or public display of paraphernalia, symbolism attributed to extremist organisations is punished under Article 278-4. Concerningly, to 'knowingly submit a false application to law enforcement agencies of foreign states' is also prohibited under Article 280-1. This theoretically restricts a person the ability to make a complaint to international bodies for adjudication. The punishment is 2500-3500 roubles or a term of imprisonment of up to 5 years and a ban on holding a position or participation in the Transnistrian government.

== See also ==
- Media in Transnistria
- Romanian-language schools in Transnistria
- Russification
- Anti-Romanian sentiment
- Crime in Transnistria
- LGBT rights in Transnistria
- Human rights in Moldova
