= Valeriu Mițul =

Transnistrian politician (1961–2021)

Valeriu Mițul OR
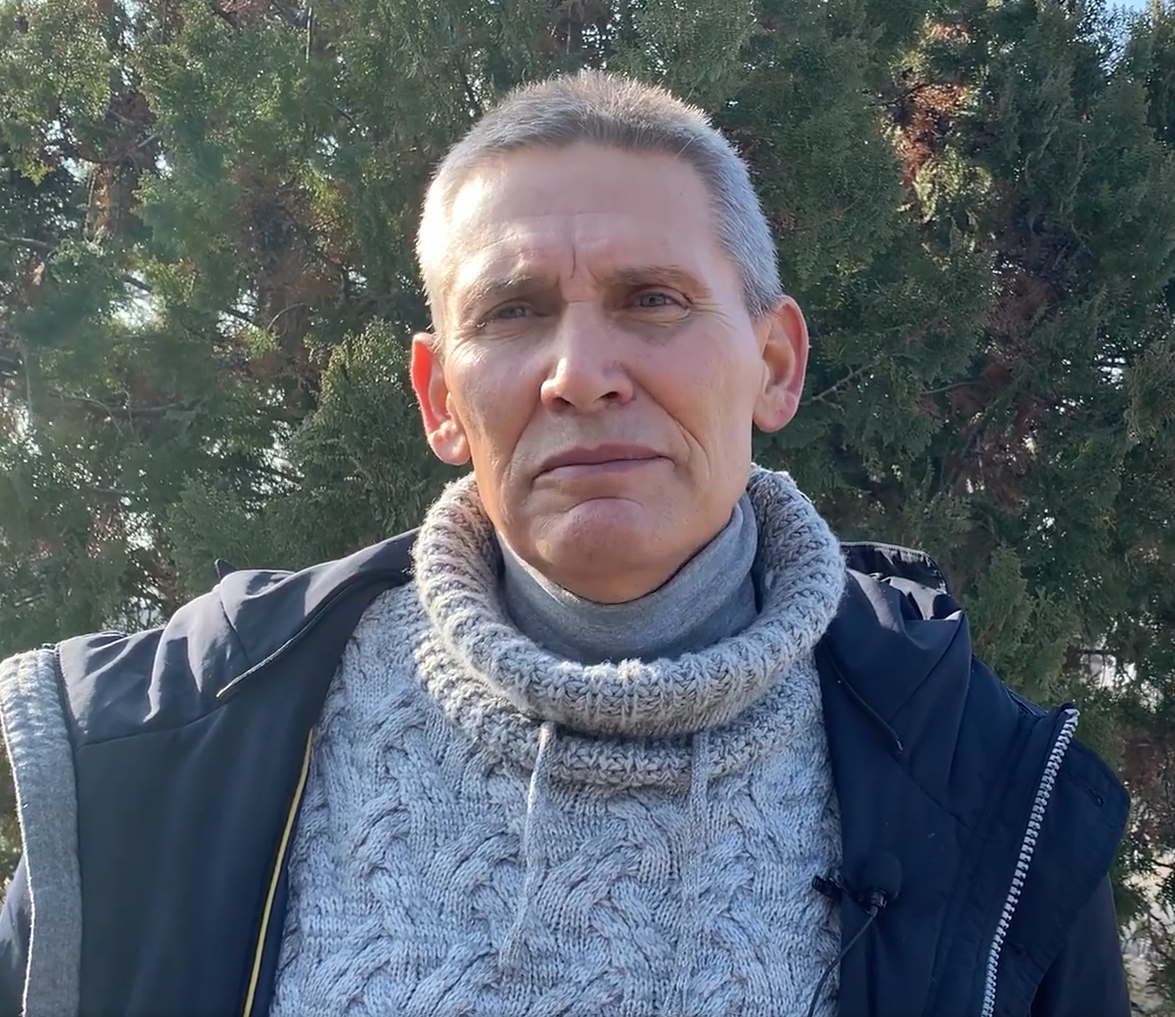

Mayor of Corjova
- In office 25 May 2003 – 5 June 2011
- Succeeded by: Sergiu Oprea

Personal details
- Born: 9 March 1961 Corjova, Moldavian SSR, Soviet Union
- Died: 2 October 2021 (aged 60)

Valeriu Mițul (9 March 1961 – 2 October 2021) was a Moldovan politician, an opponent of the separatist regime that is in power in Transnistria.

== Political activity ==
Mițul was a participant in the 1992 War of Transnistria on behalf of Moldovan governmental forces. He was the mayor of Corjova village, considered by separatist authorities as a suburb of Dubăsari.

As a result of his opposition to authorities from Tiraspol, he was arrested several times by Transnistrian police, most recently on 13 May 2007.

Mițul was elected mayor of Corjova in the Moldovan local election, 2003, as a candidate representing the ASLMN party.

During the Moldovan municipal elections on 3 June 2007, the Transnistrian authorities prevented the inhabitants of Corjova from participating in the elections. Mițul, who was up for re-election, received death threats.

== See also ==
- Human rights in Transnistria
