= Stefan Kitzac =

Transnistrian politician

Colonel General Stefan Florovich Chițac (Russian: Стефан Флорович Кицак; Romanian: Ștefan Florovici Chițac; December 28, 1933 - August 7, 2011) was a Transnistrian politician who served as the 3rd Minister of Defence of Transnistria from 1991 to 1992 and the Chief Military Inspector of the Commander-in-Chief of the Armed Forces of the PMR from October 1992 to his death in 2011.

== Early life and education ==
He was born into a family of Romanian peasants on December 28, 1933, in the village of Ostrița (now Ostrytsia), in the then Kingdom of Romania (now a village in the Chernivtsi Raion of the Chernivtsi Oblast of Ukraine). After graduating from a 7-year school in his native village and the Chernivtsi Pedagogical College (now part of the Chernivtsi University), he worked as a mathematics teacher at the Dibrovskaya Secondary School in Transcarpathia. In 1952 he was called up for active military service in the Soviet Army and sent to study at the Vinnytsia Machine Gun School. In 1965, he graduated in absentia from the Faculty of Economics and Geography at Moscow State University, specializing in geography. In 1966 he graduated from the Frunze Military Academy.

== Military experience ==
=== Soviet Army ===
From 1954 to 1963, he served as a platoon commander and company commander in the Kiev Military District, the Northern Military District, the Leningrad Military District, and the Carpathian Military District. He participated in combat operations against Ukrainian Insurgent Army units in 1953 in the Ukrainian SSR. From 1966 to 1971, he served as a motorized rifle battalion commander, operations officer, and regiment commander in the Southern Group of Forces in Hungary (Budapest) and Czechoslovakia (Szeged). He participated in the Soviet invasion of Czechoslovakia. Upon returning to the USSR, he was sent to the Turkestan Military District, in the city of Tashkent. From 1980 to 1989, he participated in the Soviet–Afghan War. From 1986 to 1989, he was deputy chief of staff of the 40th Army in Kabul. From 1989 to 1990, he served as Deputy Chief of Staff of the 14th Guards Combined Arms Army in Tiraspol. He retired in May 1990.

=== Transnistria ===
From September 30, 1991, to September 1992, he was Commander of the Republican Guard and Minister of Defense of the PMR.

From the end of 1992 until the last days of his life, he was the chief military inspector of the Commander-in-Chief of the Armed Forces. He was also an advisor to the President of Transnistria and Secretary of the Security Council of Transnistria. On December 19, 2003, by decree of the President Igor Smirnov, he was awarded the military rank of lieutenant general.

== Death and legacy ==
He died on August 7, 2011, in the Republican Clinical Hospital in Tiraspol, at the age of 78. The 1st Guards Motorised Rifle Brigade "Stefan Kitzac" of the Armed Forces of Transnistria based in Tiraspol is named in his honor.
