= Corjova, Dubăsari =

Corjova
- Commune
- Location in Moldova
- Coordinates: 47°18′N 29°08′E
- Country: Moldova
- District: Dubăsari

Government
  - Mayor: Sergiu Oprea

Population (2004 census)
  - Total: 3,231
- Time zone: UTC+2 (EET)
  - Summer (DST): UTC+3 (EEST)

Corjova is a commune in Dubăsari District, Moldova. Located on the eastern bank of the River Dniester, it consists of two villages, Corjova and Mahala, with a total population of 3,231.

The Romanian language Mihai Eminescu Lyceum is located in Corjova village.

== History ==
During the Soviet period, it was considered a suburb of the nearby city of Dubăsari, but has since separated from the city and elects its own mayor. During the 1992 War of Transnistria the village was the scene of heavy fighting. After the war it was divided between a part controlled by the government of Moldova and a part controlled by the secessionist government of Transnistria.

On 13 May 2007, Transnistrian separatist authorities briefly detained Valeriu Mițul, the mayor of Corjova, and Iurie Coțofan, a Dubăsari district councillor. On 3 June 2007, Iurie Coțofan was again detained. Transnistrian militsiya (police force) did not allow the inhabitants to participate in Moldovan elections. Valentin Besleag, a candidate for mayoral office, was also detained by the separatist authorities on 2 June.

In February 2023, the mayor of the commune, Sergiu Oprea, said in an interview with Vocea Basarabiei that the work of local Moldovan police and attempts to organize a census of the population are restricted by Transnistrian authorities.

== Population ==
Ethnic composition
Ethnic group	2004 census		
Ethnic group	Corjova	Mahala	Total
Moldovans	1,732	962	2,694
Ukrainians	142	126	268
Russians	170	78	248
Jews	1	5	6
Gagauzians	3	1	4
Poles	2	-	2
others and undeclared	5	4	9
Total	2,055	1,176	3,231

== Notable natives ==
- Isidor Sârbu (1886–1980), victim of Soviet repression, Mayor of Corjova
- Nichita Smochină (1894–1980), scholar and political figure
- Timofei Moșneaga (1932–2014), physician, Minister of Health of Moldova
- Vladimir Voronin (born 1941), 3rd President of Moldova
- Vasile Iovv (1942–2025), engineer, First Deputy Prime Minister of Moldova
- Valeriu Mițul (1961–2021), mayor of Corjova
