= Alexander Lukyanenko =

Transnistrian politician

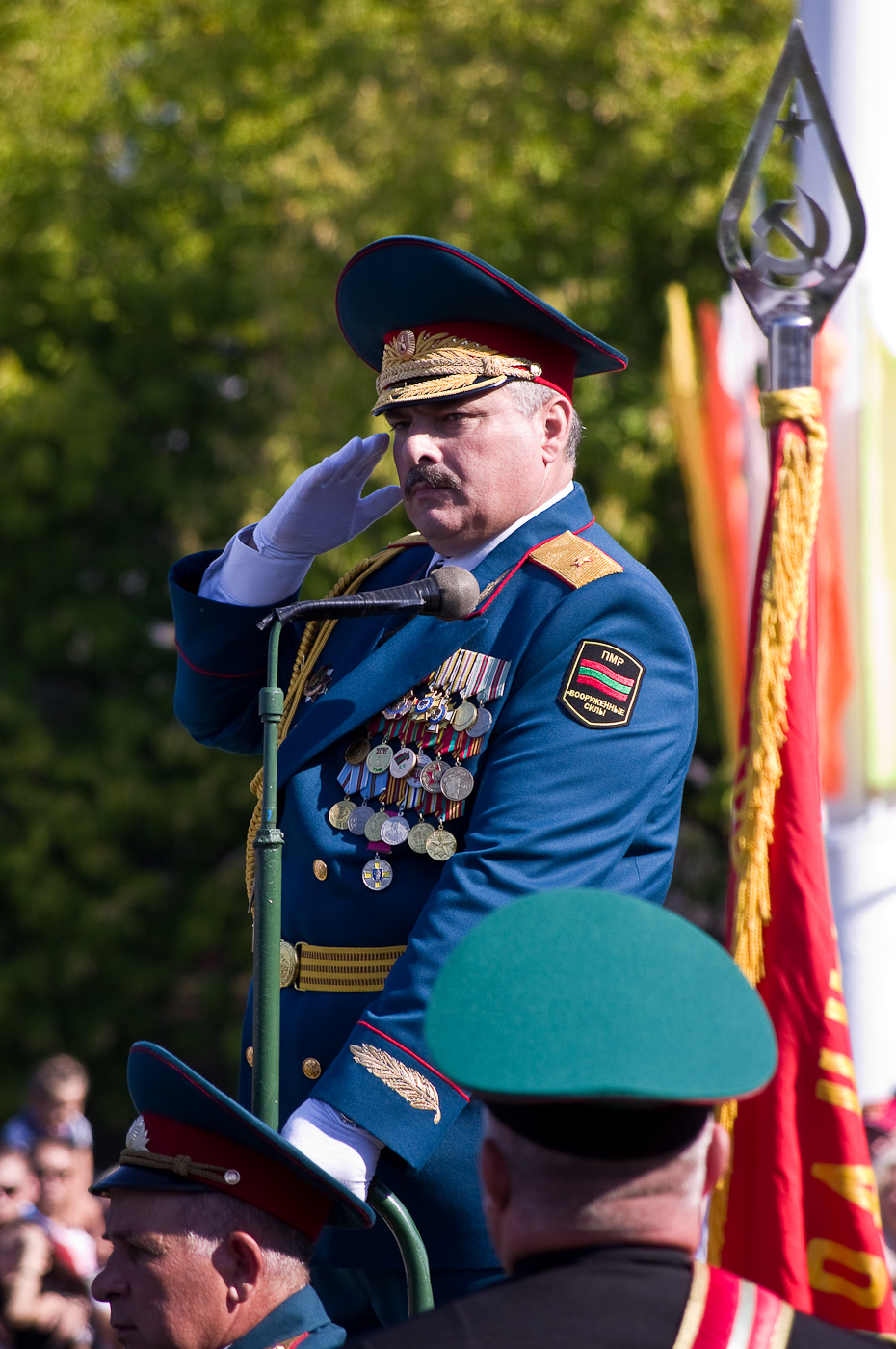
Lukyanenko during a parade in 2012

Major General Alexander Alexeyevich Lukyanenko (Russian: Александр Алексеевич Лукьяненко) (born 13 September 1961 in Budapest, Hungary) is a Transnistrian politician who served as the 3rd Minister of Defence of Transnistria from 2012 to 2015 in the government of President Yevgeny Shevchuk.

He was born in Budapest, the capital of Hungarian People's Republic, as the son of a soldier serving with the Central Group of Forces. In 1978, he graduated from a Suvorov Military School in Ussuriysk and then at the Tashkent Higher All-Arms Command School in 1982. Throughout the next 30 years, he served in various units within the Soviet Army and the Armed Forces of Transnistria. On 26 January 2012, he was appointed Minister of Defense of the PMR. In August of that year, he was promoted to Major General. On 30 December 2015, he was dismissed from military service and was transferred to the reserve.

He is married and has a son and a daughter.
