= Stanislav Hazheyev =

Transnistrian military officer

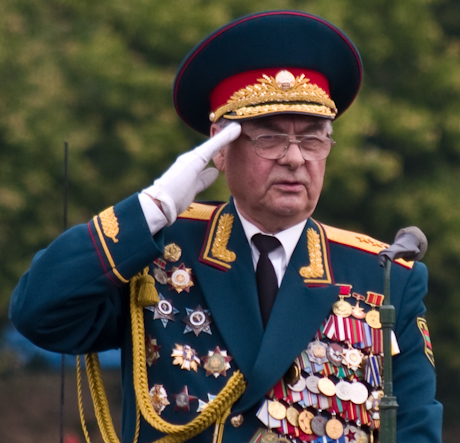
Hazheev during a parade in 2011

Stanislav Galimovich Hazheyev (Russian: Станислав Галимович Хажеев; born 28 December 1941) is a Transnistrian military officer who served as the Minister of Defence.

== Early life and career ==
Hazheyev was born in Kashtak, now a neighborhood in the north of Chelyabinsk, in Russia. He is of Belarusian ethnicity. Hazheev is a career soldier, and studied first at the Suvorov Military School in Sverdlovsk, then at the Tashkent Higher All-Arms Command School, where he graduated in 1963, and finally at the Frunze Military Academy in Moscow.

He held various command positions in the Soviet Army, first in the Turkestan Military District, then in the Odessa Military District and after that in the Transbaikal Military District. From 1983 until 1986, Hazheev served as chief adviser to the Soviet military mission in the Socialist Republic of Vietnam. Back in the Soviet Union, he was assigned to the post of Deputy Commander of the Higher Military School of Vladikavkaz.

== Transnistria ==
Hazheyev and has worked in the armed forces of Transnistria since 1992, in that same year, he also became Minister of Defence. His first rank in the Transnistrian Army was lieutenant general, but he currently holds the rank of colonel general.

== Personal life ==
He has an adult son.
