= Oleg Obruchkov =

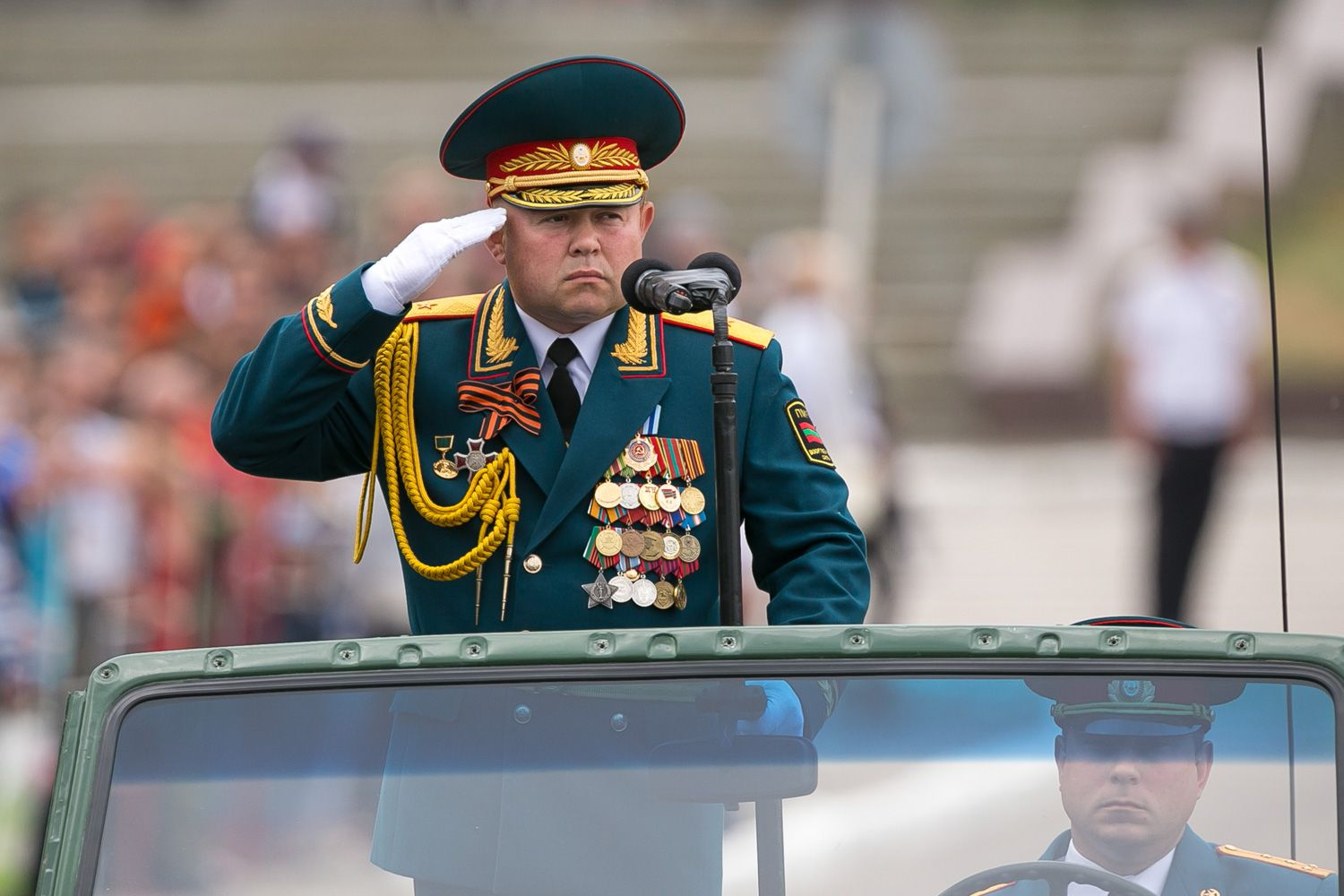
Obruchkov during a Victory Day parade in Tiraspol in 2018.

Lieutenant General Oleg Alexandrovich Obruchkov (Russian: Олег Александрович Обручков, born on June 4, 1975 in Parcani, Slobozia District, Moldovan SSR, USSR) is the current Minister of Defence of Transnistria (officially the Pridnestrovian Moldavian Republic), serving in that position since December 26, 2016.
