= Human rights in Moldova =

Overview of human-rights abuses in Moldova

The condition of human rights in Moldova has come under scrutiny since 2002, and human rights organizations within Moldova and around the world have spoken out against what they feel to be unfair suppression of the independent media, as well as other abuses.

As of 2024, the U.S. State Department's Office to Monitor and Combat Trafficking in Persons places Moldova on the "Tier 2 Watch List", indicating that while the government is making significant efforts to combat human trafficking, it does not yet fully meet the minimum standards for elimination.

== History ==
State media coverage of the street protests in 2002 regarding the Communists’ attempt to reinstate obligatory study of the Russian language and to defend the cultural identity that the majority of Moldovans share with neighboring Romania was censored. In February 2002, in response to severe censorship of the state broadcast station Teleradio-Moldova (TVM), hundreds of TVM journalists went on strike in solidarity with the anti-communist opposition. In retribution, a few journalists and staff members were dismissed or suspended from the station in March.

However, in 2004 an improvement was made and the Moldovan Parliament removed Article 170 from the country's Criminal Code. Article 170 called for up to five years imprisonment for defamation.

According to the Organization for Security and Co-operation in Europe, the media climate in Moldova remained restrictive as of 2004. Authorities continued a long-standing campaign to silence independent opposition voices and movements. In a case widely criticized by human rights defenders, opposition politician Valeriu Pasat was sentenced to a ten-year prison term. The United States and human rights defenders from the European Union consider him a political prisoner, and an official statement from Russia's Ministry of Foreign Affairs called the judgment "striking in its cruelty".

According to Amnesty International's 2007 annual report, the state of human rights in Moldova was poor. Torture and ill-treatment were widespread and conditions in pre-trial detention were poor. A number of treaties protecting women's rights were ratified, but men, women and children continued to be trafficked for forcible sexual and other exploitation. Measures to protect women against domestic violence were inadequate. Constitutional changes to abolish the death penalty were made. Freedom of expression was restricted and opposition politicians were targeted.

In 2009, when Moldova experienced its most serious civil unrest in a decade, several civilians like Valeriu Boboc were killed by police and many more injured. According to Human Rights Report of the United States Department of State, released in April 2011, "In contrast to the previous year, there were no reports of killings by security forces. During the year reports of government exercising undue influence over the media substantially decreased." But "Transnistrian authorities continued to harass independent media and opposition lawmakers; restrict freedom of association, movement, and religion; and discriminate against Romanian speakers." Moldova "has made “noteworthy progress” on religious freedom since the era of the Soviet Union, but it can still take further steps to foster diversity," said the UN Special Rapporteur on freedom of religion or belief Heiner Bielefeldt, in Chişinău, in September 2011.

On 19 April 2021, the Council of Europe Action Plan for the Republic of Moldova 2021–2024, which had among its objectives working on the situation of human rights in Moldova, was signed on Strasbourg, France.

== Rights of vulnerable groups ==
=== Romani people ===
Discrimination against Romani people is a systemic problem in Moldovan society. Law enforcement bodies, the police in particular, show a discriminatory attitude, hostility, abusive behavior, and physical and psychological violence towards them. Bad treatments usually take place during detention and aim to obtain testimonies and statements. There were also cases where state authorities refused to investigate or sanction cases of physical abuse committed by individuals against Romani people. The Romani people literacy level is below the national average, and some communities do not have running water, plumbing and heating.

== Freedom of expression and of the press ==
Moldovan Constitutions and laws protect freedom of expression and media freedom, and forbid censorship. Still, direct and indirect censorship is practiced, and Moldova is ranked as "partly free" in Freedom House 2016 Freedom of the Press report.

In 2020, freedom house said that while on paper there was strong media protection, the defamation laws allow for rights to be stripped, which becomes " an easy and comfortable mechanism for exerting pressure on the media as people acting in bad faith can influence official examiners, particularly at the local level."(e.g. in 2020, president Igor Dodon filed a defamation case against Ziarul de Gardă for reporting on his holidays.)

== Historical situation ==
The following chart shows Moldova's ratings since 1991 in the Freedom in the World reports, published annually by Freedom House. A rating of 1 is "free"; 7, "not free".^{1}

The 2021 ratings were for Political rights 3, and for Civil Liberties 3.

Historical ratings

Year	Political Rights	Civil Liberties	Status	President^{2}^{3}
1991	5	4	Partly Free	Mircea Snegur
1992	5	5	Partly Free	Mircea Snegur
1993	5	5	Partly Free	Mircea Snegur
1994	4	4	Partly Free	Mircea Snegur
1995	4	4	Partly Free	Mircea Snegur
1996	3	4	Partly Free	Mircea Snegur
1997	3	4	Partly Free	Mircea Snegur
1998	2	4	Partly Free	Petru Lucinschi
1999	2	4	Partly Free	Petru Lucinschi
2000	2	4	Partly Free	Petru Lucinschi
2001	2	4	Partly Free	Petru Lucinschi
2002	3	4	Partly Free	Vladimir Voronin
2003	3	4	Partly Free	Vladimir Voronin
2004	3	4	Partly Free	Vladimir Voronin
2005	3	4	Partly Free	Vladimir Voronin
2006	3	4	Partly Free	Vladimir Voronin
2007	3	4	Partly Free	Vladimir Voronin
2008	4	4	Partly Free	Vladimir Voronin
2009	3	4	Partly Free	Vladimir Voronin
2010	3	3	Partly Free	Mihai Ghimpu (acting)
2011	3	3	Partly Free	Marian Lupu (acting)
2012	3	3	Partly Free	Marian Lupu (acting)
2013	3	3	Partly Free	Nicolae Timofti
2014	3	3	Partly Free	Nicolae Timofti
2015	3	3	Partly Free	Nicolae Timofti
2016	3	3	Partly Free	Nicolae Timofti
2017	3	3	Partly Free	Igor Dodon
2018	3	4	Partly Free	Igor Dodon
2019	3	4	Partly Free	Igor Dodon
2020	3	3	Partly Free	Igor Dodon
2021^{4}	3	3	Partly Free	Maia Sandu
2022	3	3	Partly Free	Maia Sandu
2023	3	3	Partly Free	Maia Sandu

== See also ==
- LGBT rights in Moldova
- Crime in Moldova
- Human rights in Romania
- Human rights in Transnistria
- Human rights in Ukraine

== Notes on Historical Ratings Table above ==
1. Note that the "Year" signifies the "Year covered". Therefore the information for the year marked 2008 is from the report published in 2009, and so on.
2. As of January 1.
3. Moldova is a parliamentary republic; the presidency is considered a ceremonial position, with the prime minister and parliament holding most of the legislative power.
4. On the Freedom House spreadsheet, the ratings for every country from North Macedonia through North Korea are applied to the country that precedes it alphabetically, with North Macedonia's ratings (3 for both civil and political rights) being applied to North Korea. North Macedonia is listed as beginning with the letter “M” (as in “Macedonia, North”), whereas North Korea is listed as beginning with the letter “N”; hence, every country beginning with the letters "M" and "N" (excluding Norway) are affected.
