= Crime in Moldova =

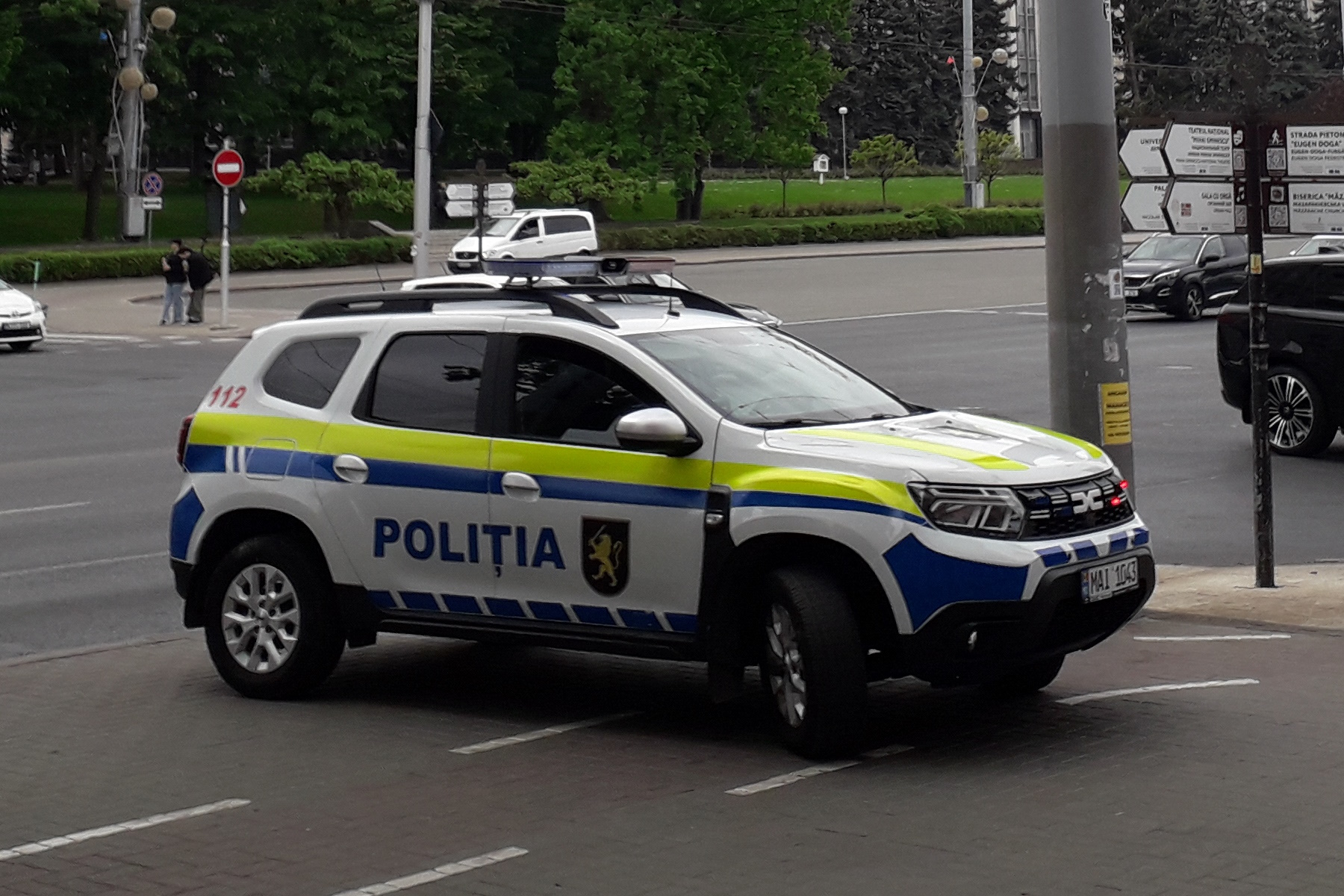
A car of the Moldovan Police

Crime in Moldova rose following the fall of Soviet Union although in recent years there has been an improvement. Corruption in Moldova, economic and drug-related crimes are the most visible and predictable results of the deteriorating economic situation. Racketeering and the mafia have also risen up during the 1990s and 2000s. Petty crimes, such as pickpocketing and street thefts, are also common.

== Crime by type ==
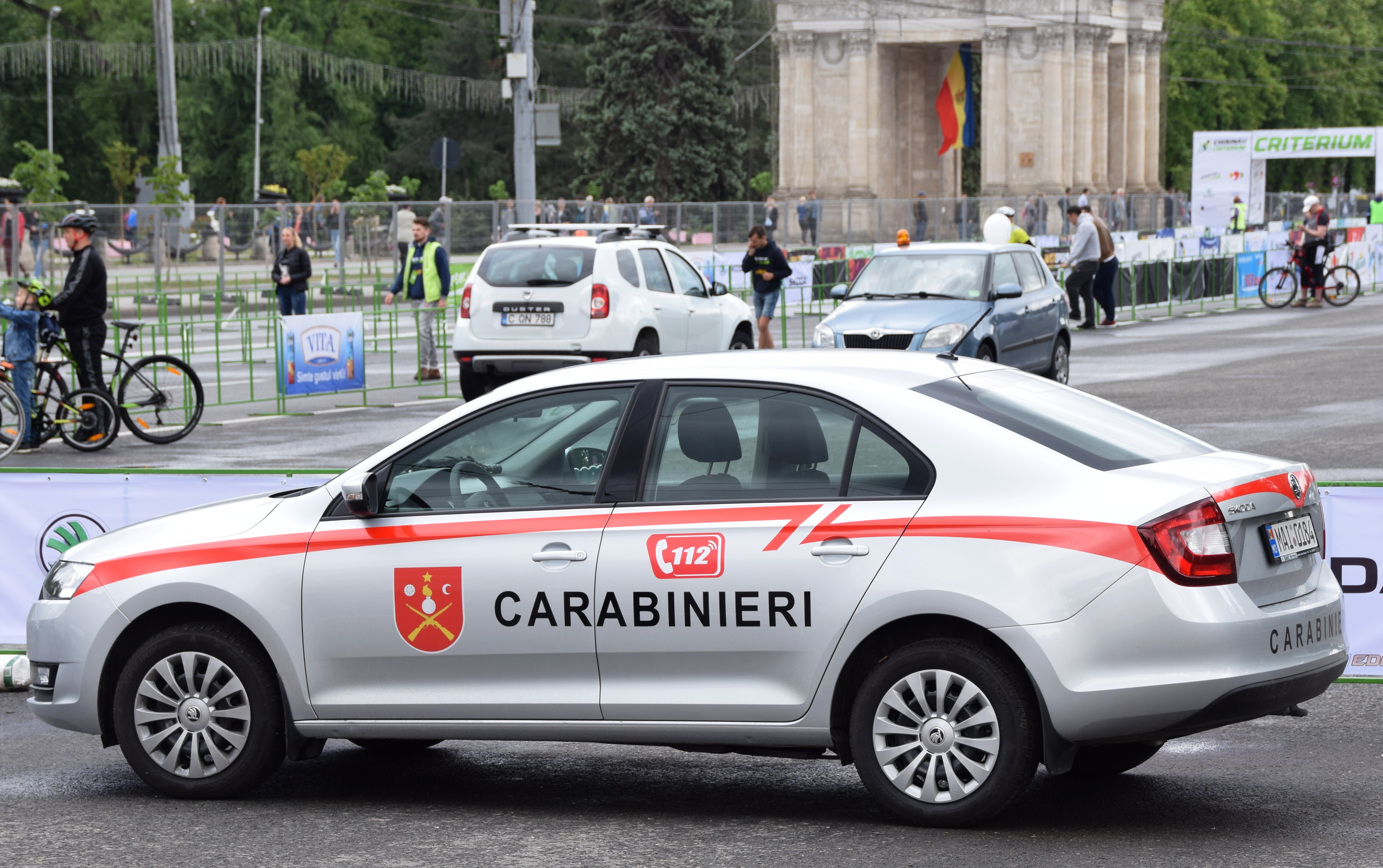
A gendarmerie car of the Moldovan Carabinieri Troops

=== Corruption ===
Corruption in Moldova is one of the country's most serious problems. In 2014, $1bn has vanished from three of Moldova's leading banks.

=== Murder ===
In 2023, Moldova had a murder rate of 2.27 per 100,000 population. There were a total of 78 murders in Moldova in 2023.

Akin to other former Soviet states, Moldova has experienced high crime rates in the 1990s after its independence, with the murder rate reaching a high of 11.4 per 100,000 people in 1992, as well as a value of 10.18 per 100,000 people in 2000, being typically in the range of 8-9 per 100,000 people during the first decade after independence.

=== Drug trade ===
Illicit cultivation of opium poppies and cannabis is carried out in Moldova, mainly for consumption in CIS countries. According to NATO, drug trafficking in Moldova is valued between $200 million to $250 million per year.

Moldova is a transshipment point for illegal drugs to Western Europe.

=== Human trafficking ===
The CIA names human trafficking, widespread crime and underground economic activity among major crime issues of Moldova. Moldova is a source and transit nation in the trafficking in human beings, in particular women and girls into forced prostitution. The annual country human rights report from the United States Department of State pinpoints some involvement by government officials and Moldovan law enforcement in human trafficking.

According to the United States Department of State Trafficking in Persons Report of 2018:

"The Government of Moldova does not fully meet the minimum standards for the elimination of trafficking; however, it is making significant efforts to do so. The government demonstrated increasing efforts compared to the previous reporting period; therefore Moldova was upgraded to Tier 2. The government demonstrated increasing efforts by investigating and prosecuting more suspected traffickers, including complicit officials, and increasing budgets for victim protection. However, the government did not meet the minimum standards in several key areas. Identifying victims and conferring official victim status continued to be a challenge. Corruption, particularly in law enforcement and the judiciary, impeded prosecutions and influenced the outcomes of cases, including cases against complicit officials. Victims continued to suffer from intimidation from traffickers, and authorities provided uneven levels of protection during court proceedings."

E. Benjamin Skinner in his book "A Crime So Monstrous", on page 156, speculates that between 1991 and 2008, up to 400,000 women were trafficked from Moldova.

=== Human rights violations ===
According to Amnesty International, the most common human rights abuses in Moldova are restrictions on freedom of association, unfair trials, torture and other ill-treatment in places of detention, and discrimination against LGBT and Roma minority.

== See also ==
- Corruption in Moldova
- Crime in Transnistria
