= Crime in Transnistria =

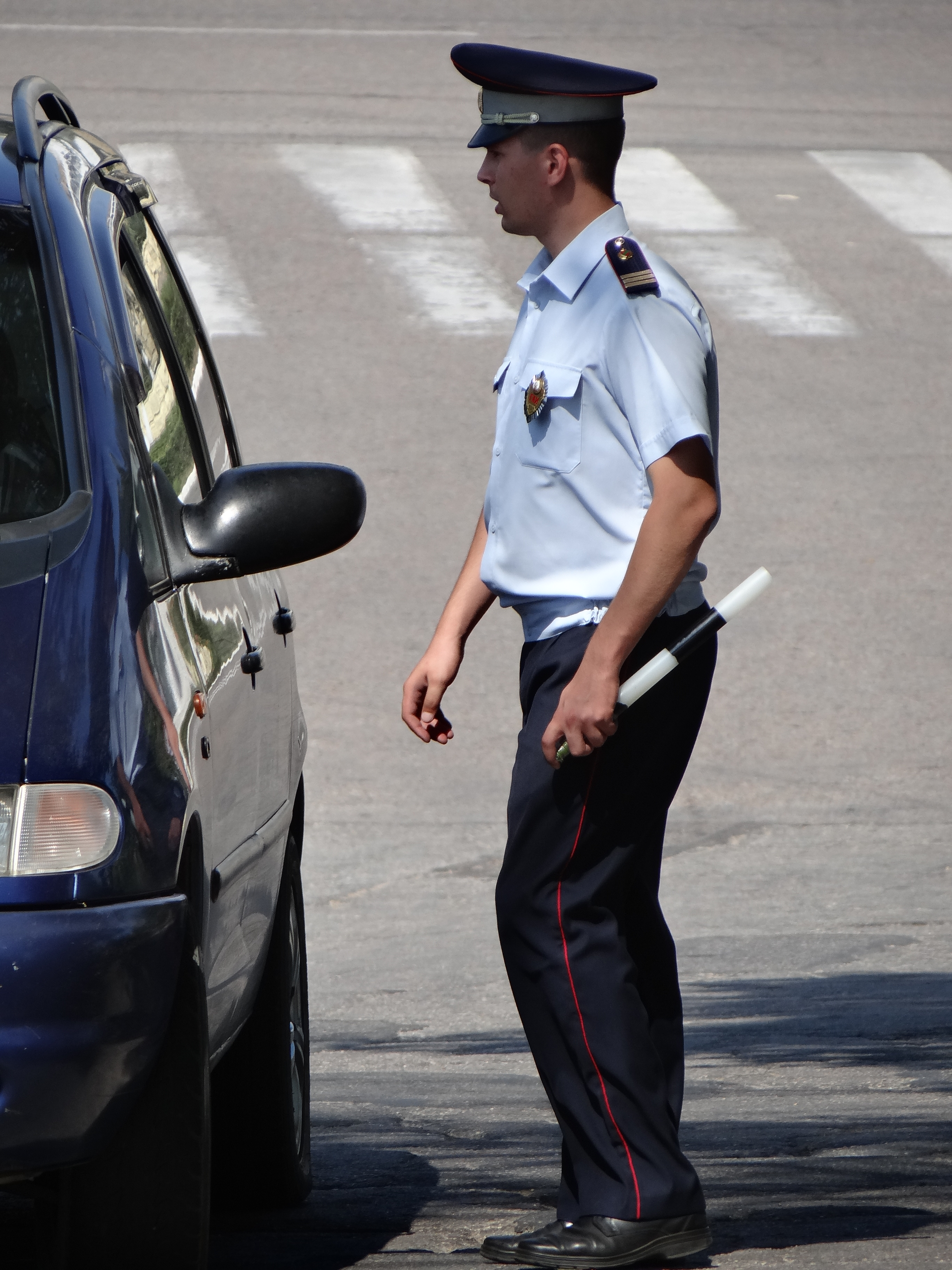
A Transnistrian policeman in Tiraspol.

Crime in Transnistria covers criminality-related incidents in the breakaway Republic of Transnistria, still nominally part of Moldova. The police organisations of Transnistria are tasked with fighting crime in the republic.

== EUBAM border controls and smuggling issues ==
Transnistria has a reputation of being a haven for smuggling. In 2002, the European Parliament's delegation to Moldova named Transnistria "a black hole in which illegal trade in arms, the trafficking in human beings and the laundering of criminal finance was carried on". In 2005, The Wall Street Journal called Transnistria "a major haven for smuggling weapons and women". However, in more recent statements, OSCE and European Union diplomats cited by Radio Free Europe called the smuggling claims "likely exaggerated".

Since 30 November 2005 the European Union has had a Border Assistance Mission (EUBAM) on Transnistria's borders with the United Nations Development Programme as implementing partner. In its official statements, the EU mission repeatedly confirmed an absence of any signs of weapons smuggling from Transnistria.

== Arms trafficking allegations ==
Foreign experts working on behalf of the United Nations confirm that the current situation in the region "has prevented effective small arms control and undermined reform of the security sector".

In 2004, an article in The Washington Times claimed that a cache of surface-to-air missile launchers, and other weapons, may have disappeared from a former Soviet stockpile, and that officials were at the time unable to account for their whereabouts. The OSCE and European Union officials state that there is no evidence that Transnistria has ever, at any time in the past, trafficked arms or nuclear material.

Foreign experts working on behalf of the United Nations say that the historically low levels of transparency and continued denial of full investigation to international monitors has reinforced negative perceptions of the Transnistrian regime, although recent good levels of cooperation on the part of Transnistrian authorities in some areas may reflect a shift in the attitude of PMR. Also it says that the evidence for the illicit production and trafficking of weapons into and from Transnistria has in the past been exaggerated, that although the trafficking of light weapons is likely to have occurred before 2001. The last year when export data showed US$900,000 worth of 'weapons, munitions, their parts and accessories' exported from Transnistria.

In 2006 special monitoring mission of Russia and Ukraine headed by deputy secretary of the Security Council of Russia Yuri Zubakov and deputy secretary of the National Security and Defense Council of Ukraine Serhiy Pirozhkov visited Transnistria and inspected enterprises, suspected in arms production. Based on the results of the inspection Zubakov and Pirozhkov stated that there have been no signs that any of the enterprises ever produced armaments or their components.

In 2013 Ukrainian Foreign Minister and Acting Chairman of the OSCE Leonid Kozhara gave an interview to El País newspaper, commenting on situation in Transnistria and results of work of the EUBAM mission. According to Kozhara, there have been no cases of arms traffic found.

== Antisemitic incidents ==
About 20 years ago, there were several antisemitic incidents in Transnistria.

- 14–15 April 2001 – the Synagogue of Tiraspol suffered a pipe bomb attack. The building was damaged, but the guard was not hurt.
- 13–30 March 2004 – over 70 tombstones in the Jewish cemetery of Tiraspol were vandalized. Local community leaders said the authorities refused to help clean up the antisemitic graffiti painted over the tombstones
- In May 2004, there was an attempt by a Russian neo-Nazi organization to set on fire a synagogue in Tiraspol, using a Molotov cocktail and a flammable liquid near a gas pipe. The attack failed when passers-by extinguished the fire.

== Terrorist incidents ==
- In July 2006, a bomb killed eight in a Tiraspol minibus.
- In August 2006, a grenade explosion in a Tiraspol trolleybus killed two and injured ten.
- In 2022, several incidents happened during the 2022 Transnistria attacks between 25 and 27 April and again on 6 May. No civilians were killed, but material damage did occur.

Certain countries, including the United States, the United Kingdom, Australia, Spain, Bulgaria and Israel caution their citizens from traveling to both Moldova and Transnistria, especially after the 2022 Russian invasion of Ukraine.

== Espionage ==
In April 2010 the journalist Ernest Vardanean was arrested on accusations of espionage in favour of Moldova. In May 2011 Igor Smirnov signed a decree stating that Vardanean could be released from jail.

== See also ==
- Crime in Moldova
- Ministry of Internal Affairs (Transnistria)
  - Law enforcement in Transnistria
- Ministry of Defence (Transnistria)
  - Armed Forces of Transnistria
  - Operational Group of Russian Forces
  - Joint Control Commission
- Ministry of State Security (Transnistria)
