= Action plan =

Document describing actions to reach a goal

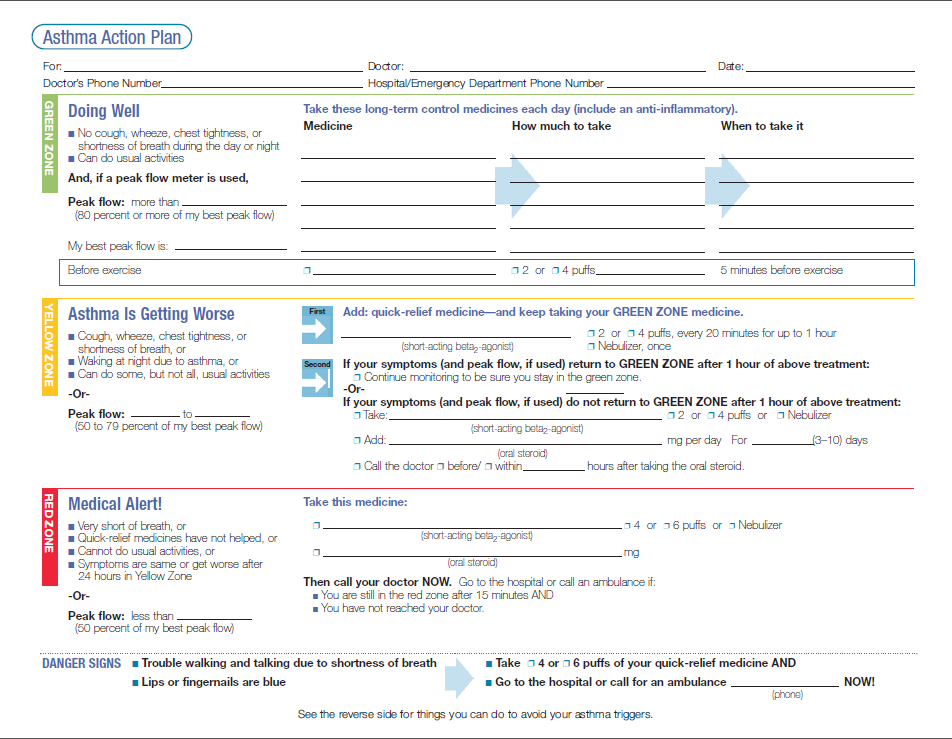

An action plan is a detailed plan outlining actions needed to reach one or more goals. Alternatively, it can be defined as a "sequence of steps that must be taken, or activities that must be performed well, for a strategy to succeed".

== Process ==
=== Origin ===
An action plan is a tool in social planning. It is an organizational strategy to identify necessary steps towards a goal. It considers details, may help limit setting for an organization, and is efficient in that it saves resources over trial and error. A written action plan also serves as a token for an organization's accountability.

=== Setting goals ===
A goal is the primary objective of an action plan. Setting goals gives the possibility of your dreams and prospects being brought to life. It creates motivation and provides you with a certainty that the final outcome will be worthwhile, preventing any wasted time and effort. This is achieved by being fully dedicated to the process and using the structured guide to accomplishing it. Although hard work may be produced, without a successful end goal the ideal result you set to achieve, will not prevail.

=== Creation ===
When creating action plans there are guided steps that need to be followed to ensure success, however the structure can be altered in the process. Firstly, you will need to outline what you want to achieve from the project, by doing this you set yourself targets. After this the specific roles will need to be allocated ensuring sufficient amount of training, resources and issues have been considered to ensure solving any problems that may occur. The next stage allows members of the group to analyse the progress by outlining milestones, solving any issues and making any necessary changes. Lastly once the project has come to an end the final stage can be examined to ensure future success.

=== Execution ===
Mike Desjardins has suggested the following

- Ownership: one person must be responsible and accountable for tracing the progress, keeping team informed, ensuring timely action steps are occurring and adjusting the actions.
- Action steps should be clear and actionable versus vague ideas or thoughts.
- Responsibility: each action step needs to have one person responsible.
- Support: For each action step, determine who will support the person responsible. This can be multiple people. The key is that they're not responsible for the action or outcome.
- Informed: keeping the right people in the communication loop for each action is critically important. Key people might need to understand the state of progress around your actions to see how they affect other actions and objectives.
- Metrics and budget: each action step must have a metric that tells us that the action is complete. For example, if you needed to survey your customers and don't have the internal resources to run the survey or want to protect anonymity, using an outside resource will require money that might not be included in your current operating budget
- Completion date

== Context ==
=== Advantages ===
Producing an action plan can be beneficial not only for individual basis but also for businesses. For example, it allows project managers or any member of a group to monitor their progress and take each task step-by-step, therefore allowing them to handle the project efficiently. The advantage of doing this is, it allows you to execute a structured plan for the end goal you intend to achieve. Furthermore, it provides the team with appropriate foundations, therefore prioritising the amount of time you spend on each task. This will then prevent any sidetracking that may occur. Lastly, it creates a bond within a team, as each member is aware of their individual role, as well as providing necessary information to ensure success of the project.

=== Issues ===
When using action plans limitations will need to be considered. Firstly, each member of the team will need to be allocated individual roles and tasks which will require completion by a set date. This can be demanding for some, due to coping with the stress and distractions that may occur. Another issue is not being guided thoroughly and effectively, leading to the lack of effort and passion a member has for the project. In addition to this, if the communication throughout the team is non-existent, key information will not reach members of the group, causing lack of confidence. Lastly failing to obtain the goal you set to reach can lead to frustration and in turn the planning would have been a waste of time. There can be more addition to this article.

=== Risk management ===
To benefit from risk management action plans, you need to examine certain possibilities that could affect the process, such as observing any threats and correcting them. For example, key aspects of risk management are to ensure you allocate members specific roles and monitor the risks throughout, to ensure tasks are completed with efficiency. This being a major factor, as evaluating what happens during and after the project, will allow finding the positive and negative elements of each stage in the planning, providing you the ability to develop on the risks further.

== Examples ==
=== Council of Europe ===
The Council of Europe has organized some action plans for helping its member states. An example of this is the Council of Europe Action Plan for the Republic of Moldova 2021–2024, created with the purpose of improving Moldova's situation on democracy, human rights and rule of law and its state institutions and legislation.

=== European Union ===
Some European Union directives describe action plans in order to reach a defined target in air quality or noise reduction. If the target cannot be reached by a member state, the member needs to write a report. Sometimes action plans contain deadlines by which the plan must be ready to start the action(s) and the targets are to be reached.

== See also ==
- Climate Action Plan
- Biodiversity action plan
