= Vardanyan =

Vardanyan (Armenian: Վարդանյան), also spelled Vardanean or Vardanian, and in Western Armenian spelled Vartanian or Vartanyan, is an Armenian surname, from the Armenian given name Vardan and Vartan with the addition of -ian.

== Persons ==
Notable people with the surname include:

=== Vardanyan ===
(Armenian / Eastern Armenian)

- Aghvan Vardanyan (born 1958), Armenian politician
- Ara Vardanyan, multiple people
- Aram Vardanyan (born 1995), Uzbek wrestler
- Armen Vardanyan (born 1982), Armenian wrestler
- David Vardanyan (1950–2022), Armenian politician
- Elena Vardanyan (born 1984), Armenian actress
- Erik Vardanyan (born 1998), Armenian footballer
- Ernest Vardanean (born 1980), Moldovan journalist
- Gegham Vardanyan (born 1988), Armenian figure skater
- Gevork Vartanian (1924−2012), Soviet spy
- Gor Vardanyan (born 1972), Armenian actor
- Greta Vardanyan (born 1986), Armenian powerlifter and para-alpine skier
- Harutyun Vardanyan (born 1970), Armenian footballer
- Hrant Vardanyan (1949–2014), Armenian businessman and philanthropist
- Julietta Vardanyan (born 1983), Armenian pianist, harpsichordist and organist
- Kamo Vardanyan (born 1966), Armenian military officer
- Karen Vardanyan (born 1976), Armenian businessman, philanthropist, son of Hrant
- Karen Vardanyan (footballer) (born 2003), Belarusian footballer
- Knarik Vardanyan (1914–1996), Soviet Armenian painter and printmaker
- Mikael Vardanyan (born 1973), Armenian businessman and philanthropist
- Norayr Vardanyan (born 1987), Armenian weightlifter
- Pargev Vardanyan (born 1996), Armenian singer and songwriter
- Ruben Vardanyan, multiple people
- Tsovinar Vardanyan (born 1980), Armenian economist and politician
- Varduhi Vardanyan (1976–2006), Armenian singer
- Yurik Vardanyan (1956−2018), Soviet Armenian weightlifter

=== Vardanian ===
- Mariam Vardanian (1864−1941), Armenian political activist and revolutionary

=== Vartanian ===
(Western Armenian)

- Ara Vartanian, Brazilian-Armenian jeweller
- Elsie Vartanian (1930–2019), American politician from New Hampshire
- Gevork Vartanian (1924−2012), Soviet intelligence officer
- Goar Vartanian (1926–2019), Soviet intelligence officer
- Hrag Vartanian (born 1973/74), American writer
- Mark Vartanian, American professional wrestler
- Mariam Vardanian (1864−1941), Armenian activist and revolutionary
- Ara Vartanian (born 1975), Brazilian jeweler
- Sylvie Vartan (born 1944), born Vartanian

=== Vartanyan ===
- Aksel Vartanyan (born 1938), Georgian-Russian journalist and sports historian
- Eduard Vartanyan (born 1991), Russian mixed martial artist

=== Vardanjan ===
- Gurgen Vardanjan (born 1963), Armenian-Hungarian figure skating coach
- Tigran Vardanjan (born 1989), Hungarian figure skater of Armenian descent

=== Vardanean ===
- Ernest Vardanean (born 1980), Armenian-Moldovan journalist and political scientist

=== Vartanean ===
- Gaik Vartanean (born 1979), Armenian-Moldovan politician

== Places ==
- Vardanjan Rural District, in Shahrekord County, Chaharmahal and Bakhtiari Province, Iran
  - Vardanjan, Iran, a village in Shahrekord County, Chaharmahal and Bakhtiari Province, Iran (aka Vardaniān, Vardangūn and Wardangun)
  - Vardanjan, Farsan, a village in Farsan County, Chaharmahal and Bakhtiari Province, Iran

== See also ==
- Vardan (disambiguation)
- Vartan (disambiguation)
