= Vartanov =

Vartanov (feminine: Vartanova) is a Russian patronymic surname derived from the Armenian given name Vartan

- Mikhail Vartanov (1937–2009), Soviet cinematographer
- Ruslan Vartanov (born 1971), Lithuanian wrestler

== Other uses ==
- Vartanian
