= Ara Vardanyan =

Ara Vardanyan may refer to:

- Ara Vardanyan (administrator) (born 1977), executive director of the Hayastan All Armenian Fund
- Ara Vardanyan (weightlifter) (born 1974), Armenian weightlifter

See also

- Vardanyan (disambiguation)
- Ara Vartanian, Brazilian-Armenian jeweller
