= Morut =

Morut may refer to:

- Aknaghbyur, Armenia, formerly Morut
- Moruț (disambiguation), villages in Romania
