= Jrambar =

Jrambar Ջրամբար
- Location within Armenia Location within Aragatsotn
- Coordinates: 40°28′55″N 44°25′59″E
- Country: Armenia
- Province: Aragatsotn
- Municipality: Aparan

Population (2011)
  - Total: 146
- Time zone: UTC+4
  - Summer (DST): UTC+5

Jrambar (Armenian: Ջրամբար) is a village in the Aparan Municipality of the Aragatsotn Province of Armenia. The local economy is based on the nearby Aparan dam and reservoir, which supplies the capital Yerevan with drinking water. Prior to the construction of the dam, the cultural monuments of the historic village of Zovuni (Poghos-Petros Church, Tukh Manuk shrine, and the S. Zoravar (General) Vardan Momikonyan Mausoleum) were moved stone-by-stone to higher ground to the east of the reservoir. The Zovuni cemetery sits to the east of the church, across a ravine.

== Gallery ==
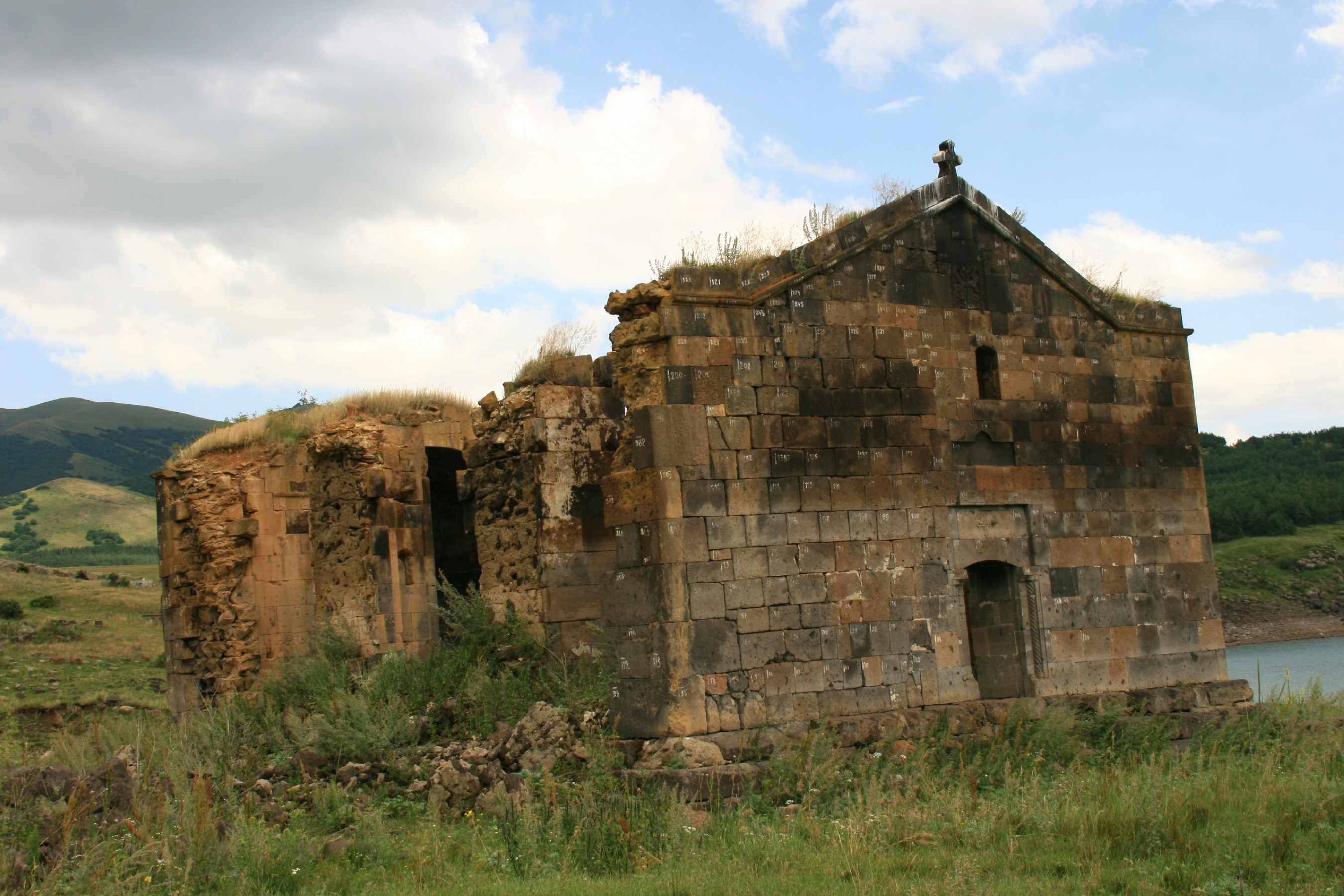
Zovuni Poghos-Petros Church

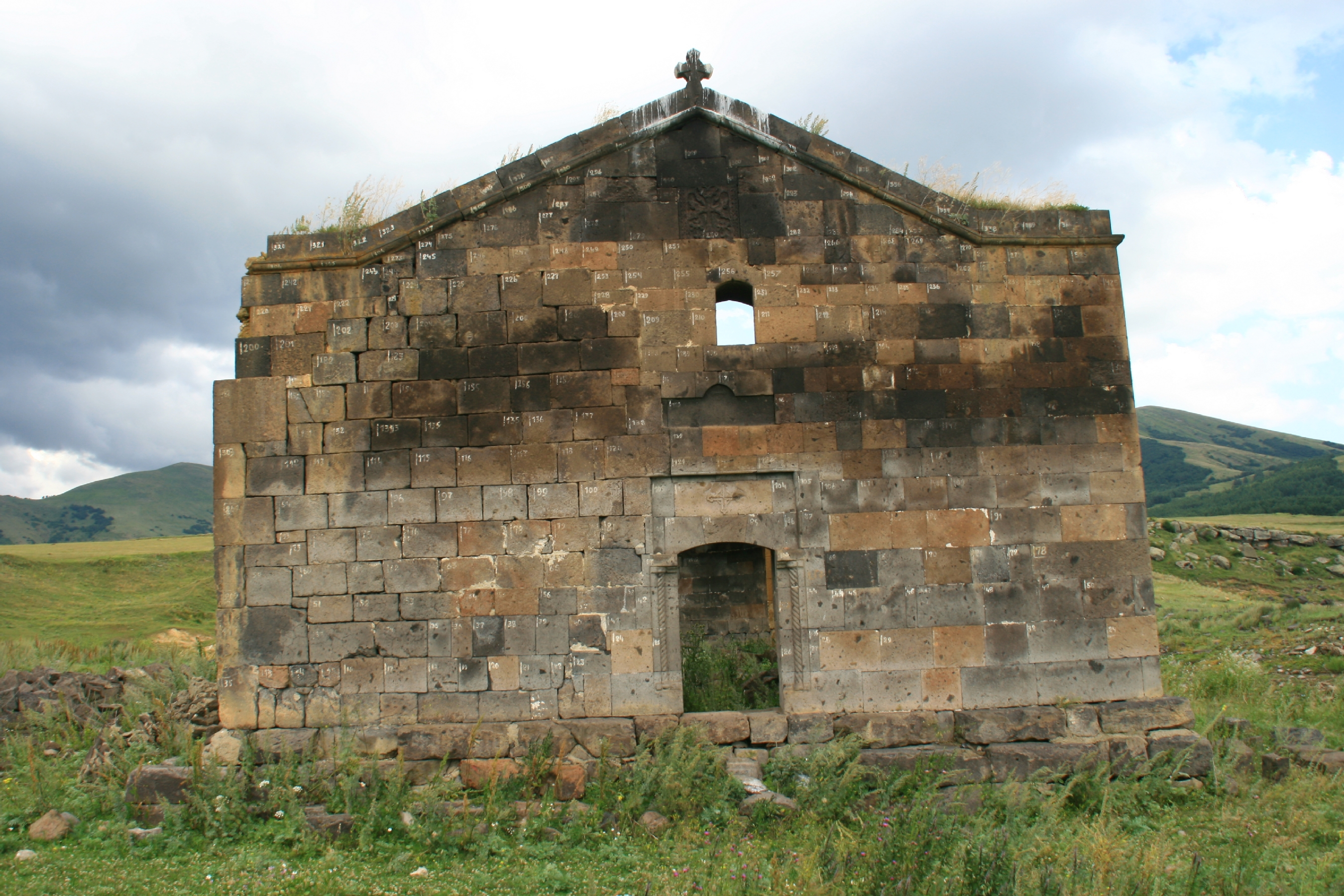
Zovuni Poghos-Petros Church

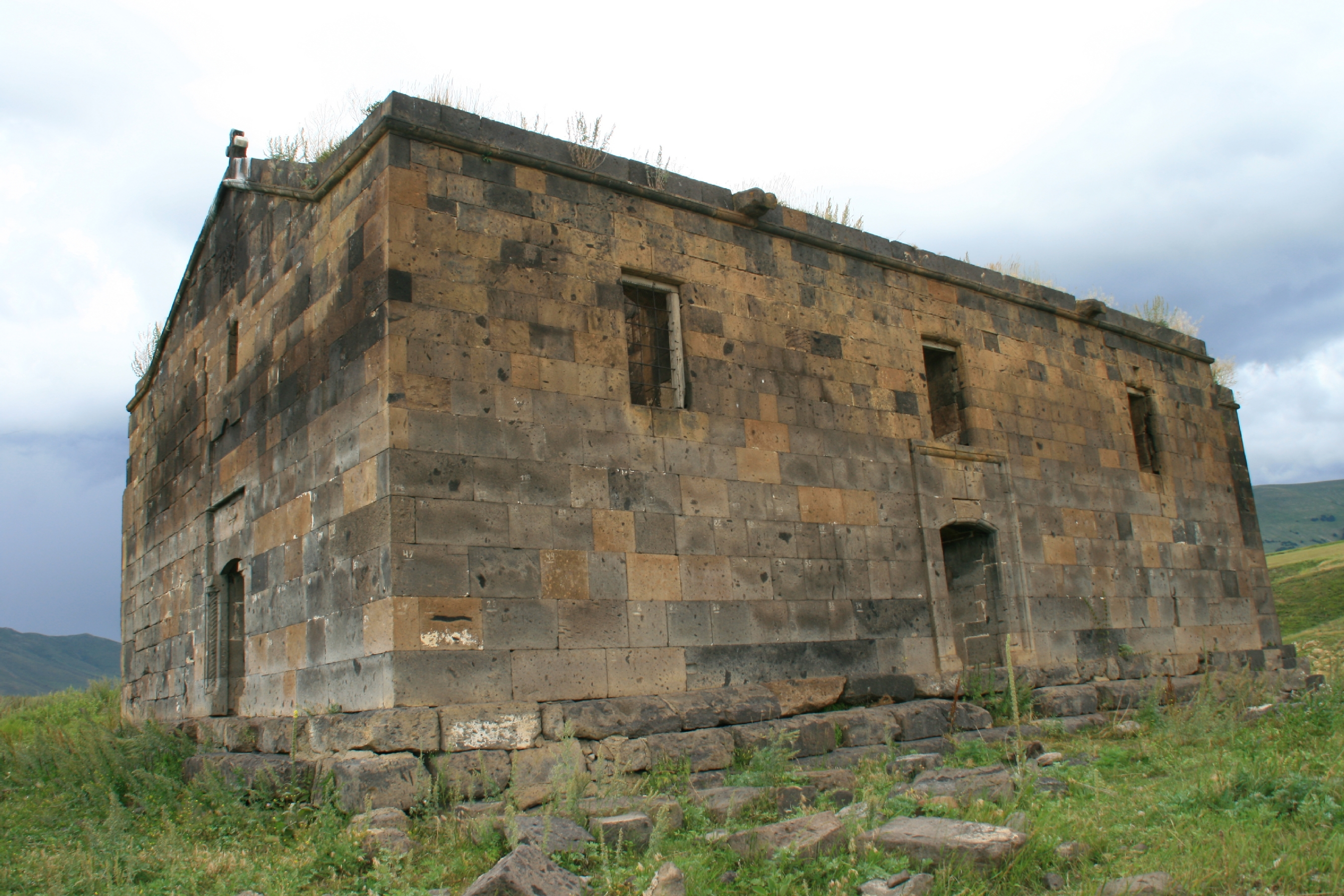
Zovuni Poghos-Petros Church

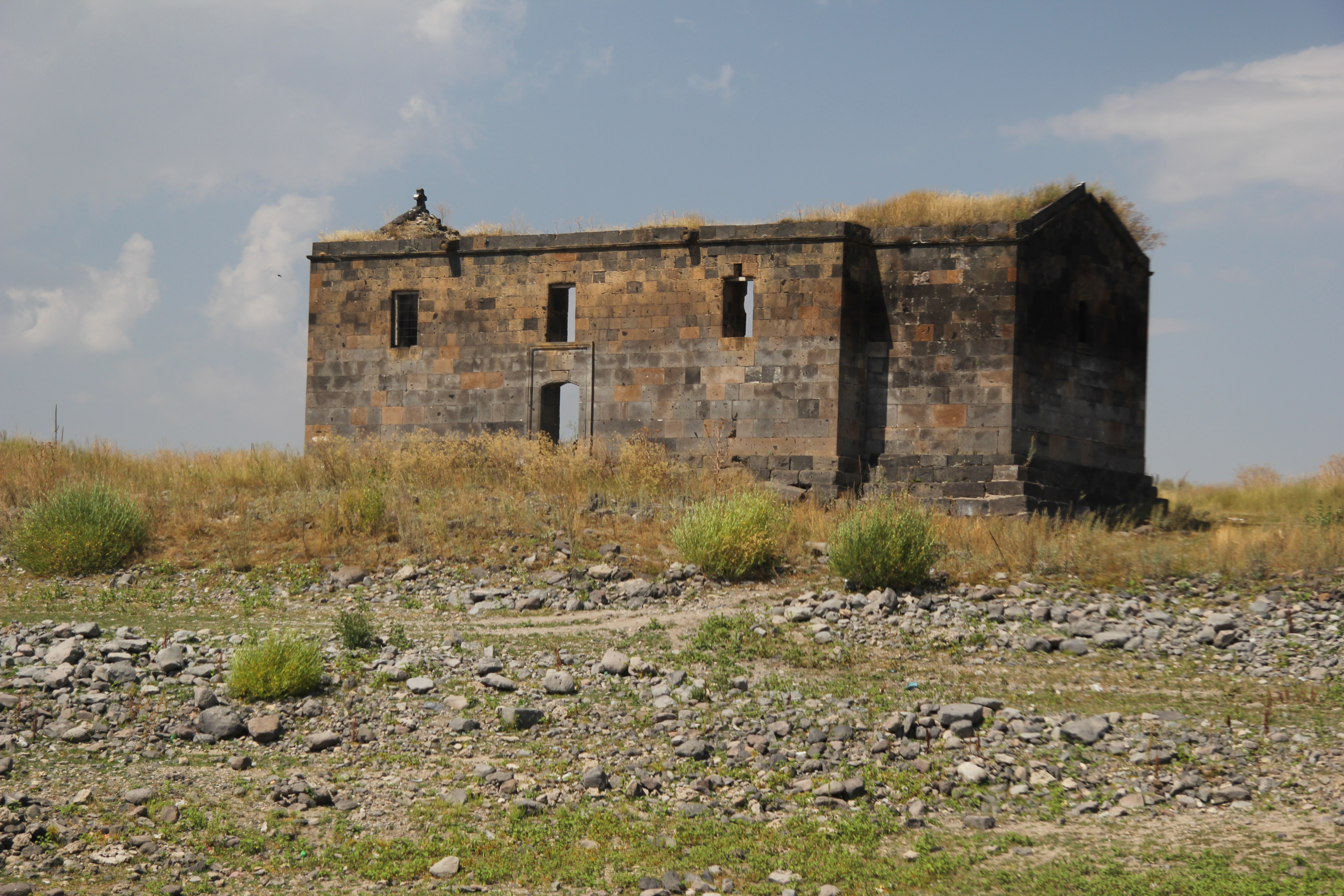
Zovuni Poghos-Petros Church

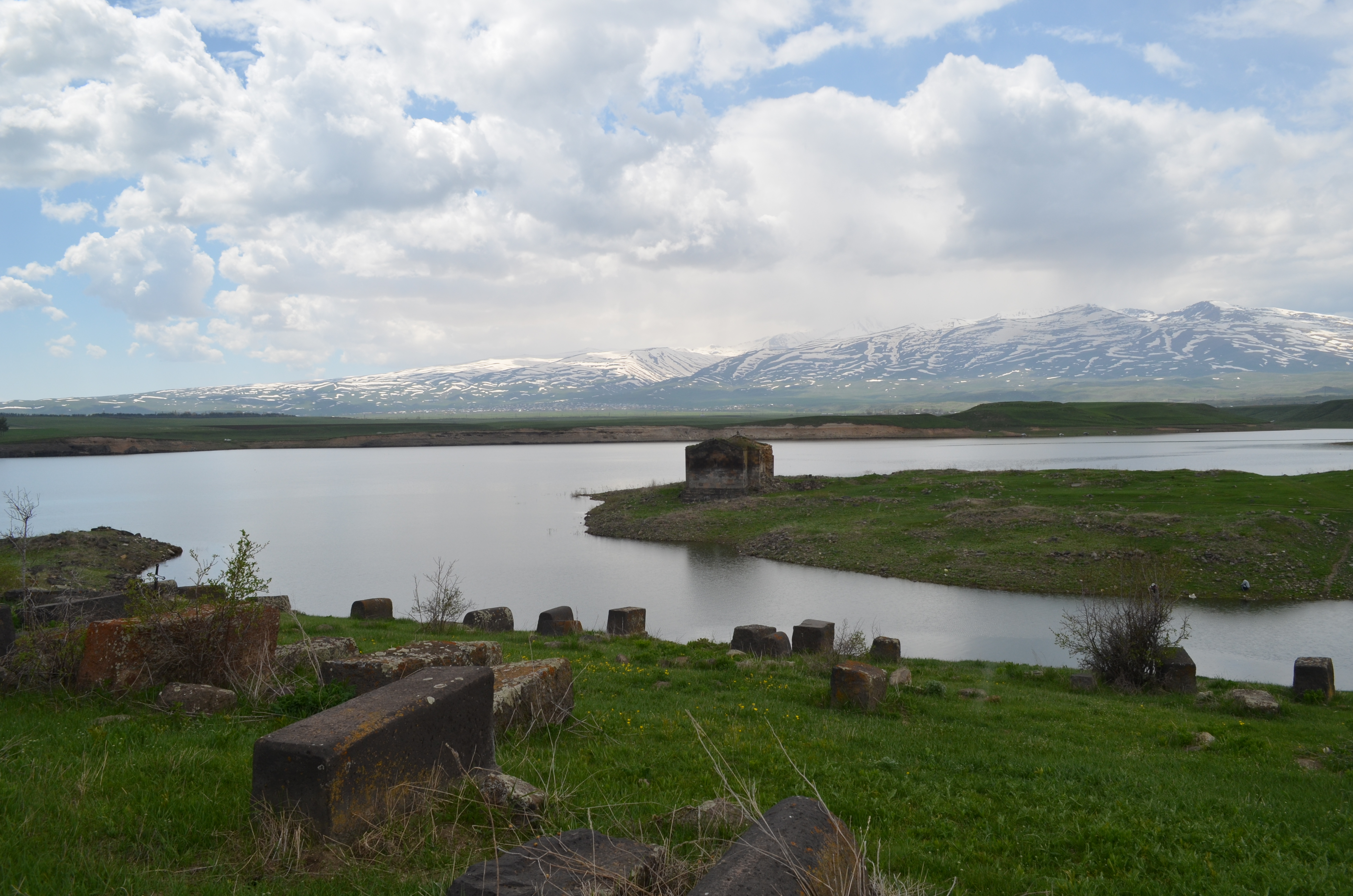
Cemetery and Zovuni Poghos-Petros Church

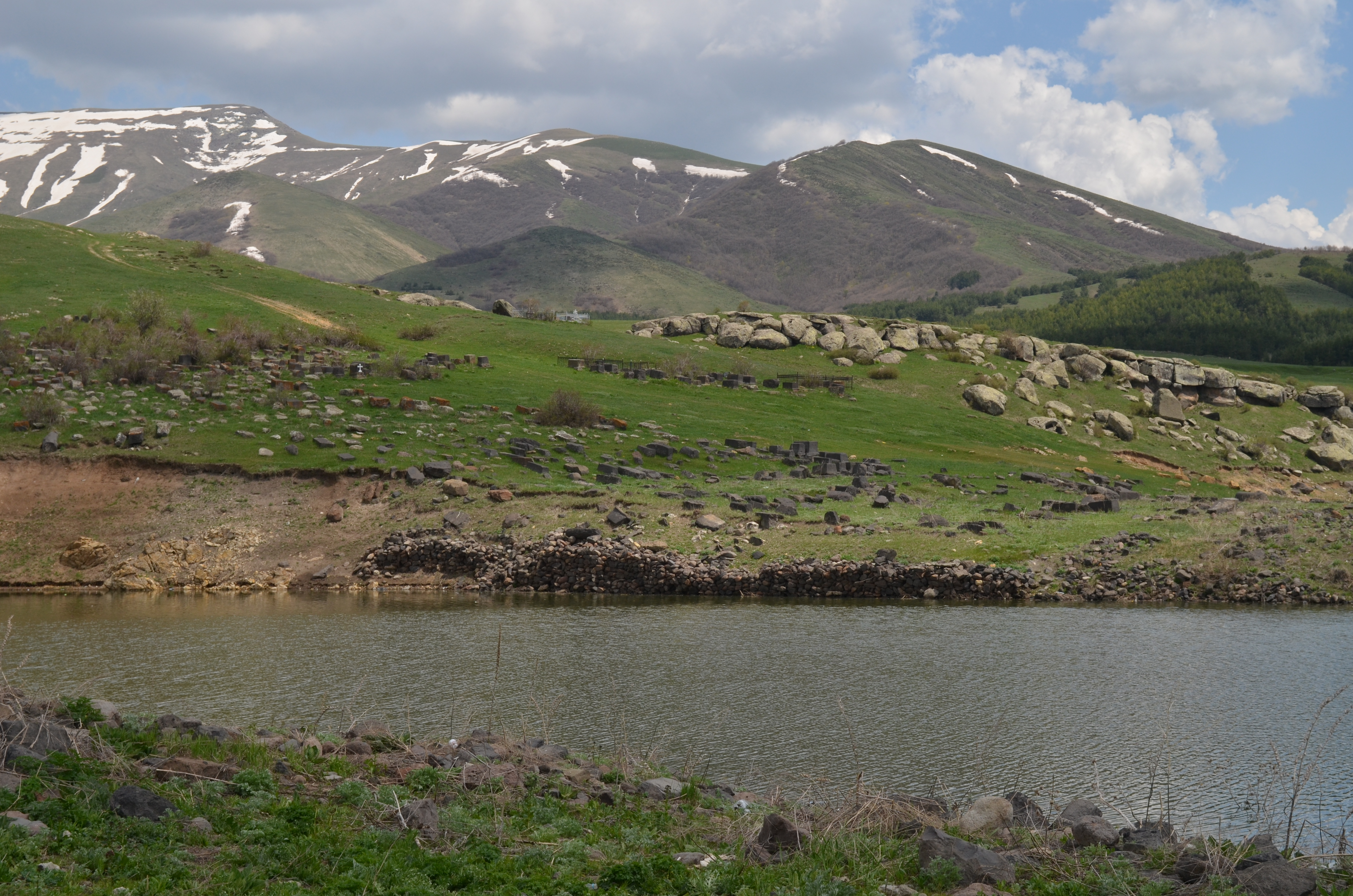
Cemetery

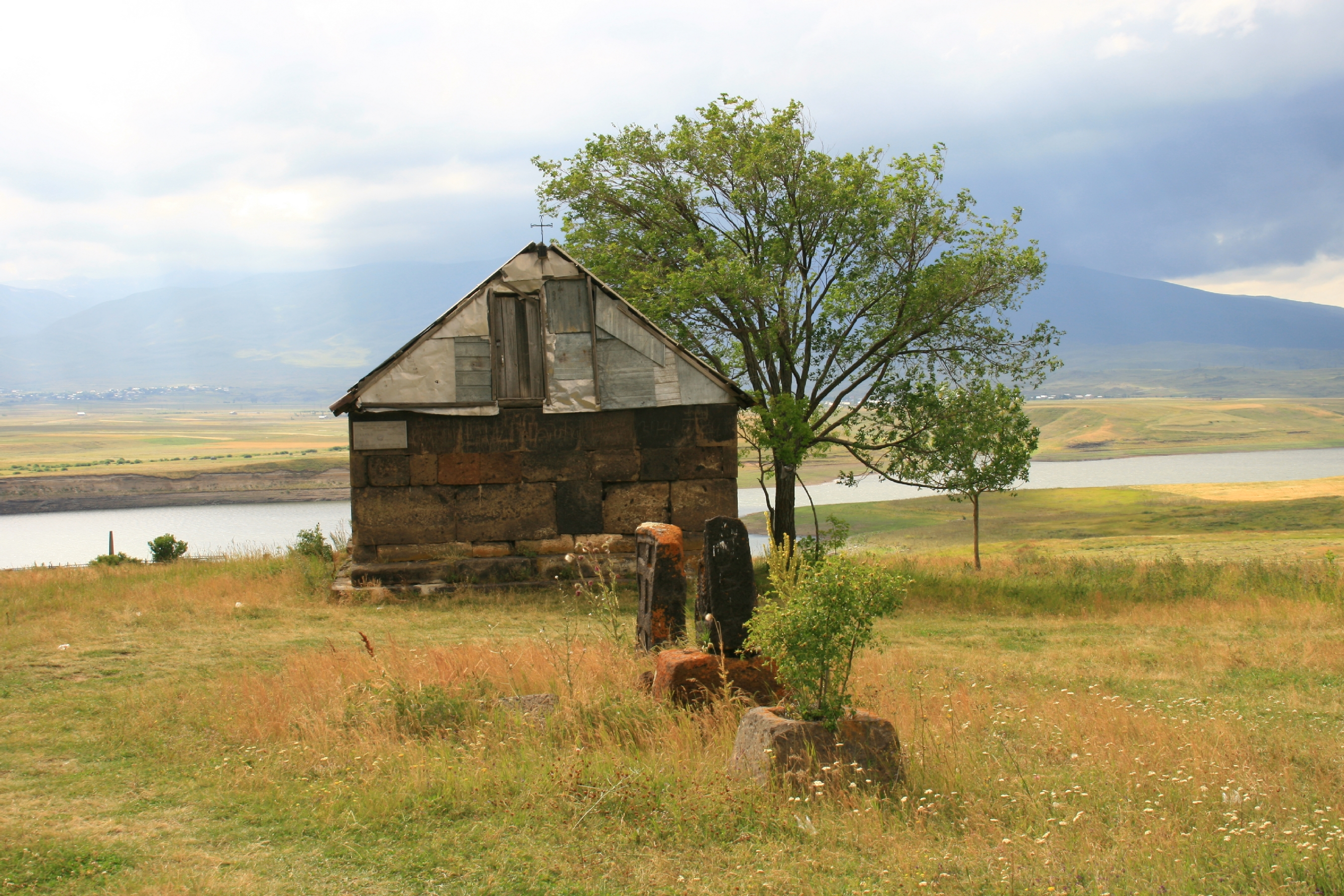
Shrine

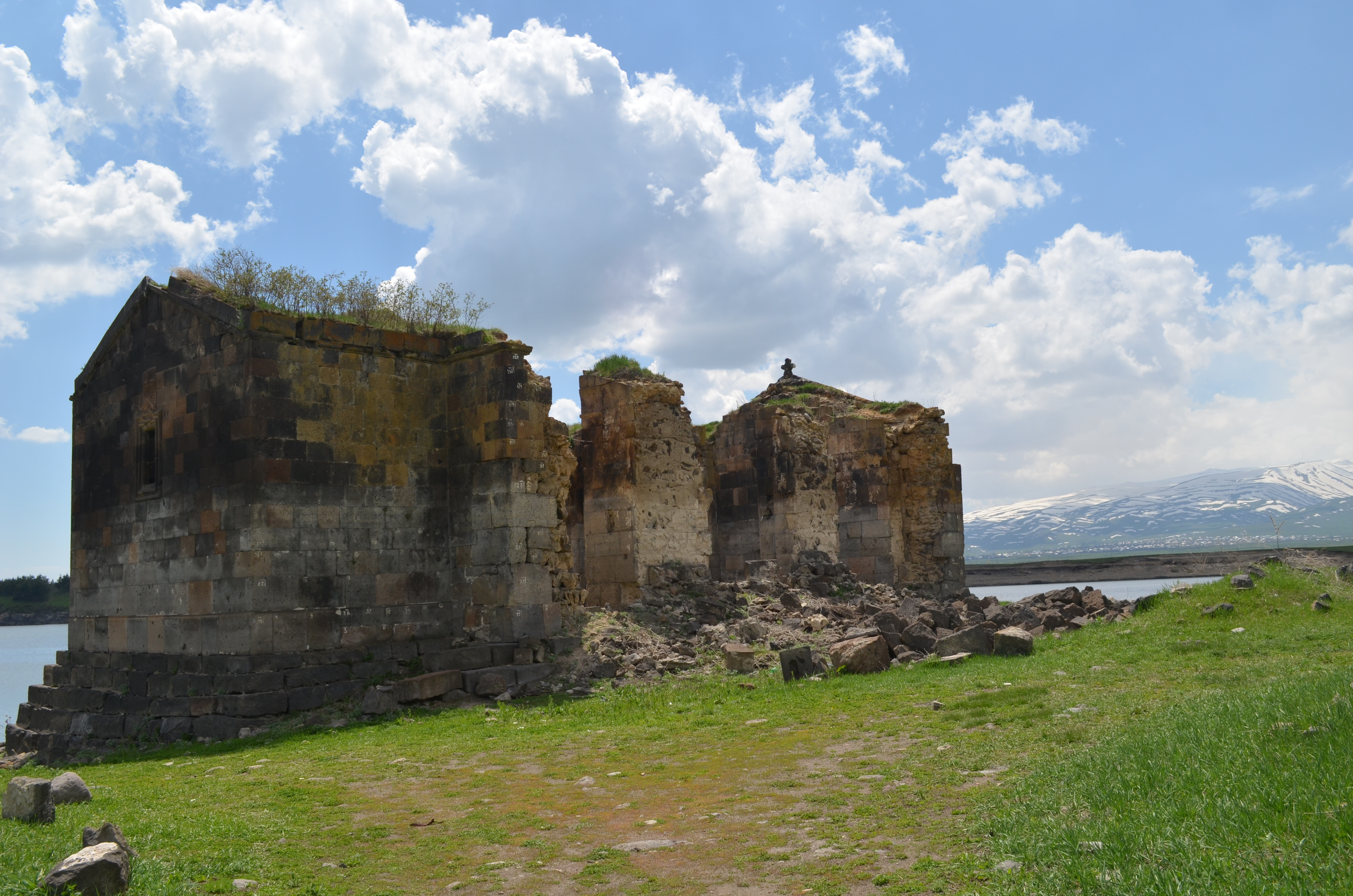
Եկեղեցի ս. Պողոս - Պետրոս
