= Vartan =

Vartan (Armenian: Վարդան), Vardan in Eastern Armenian transliteration and Wartan in Western Armenian transliteration, is an Armenian name.

Vartan, Wartan and Värtan may refer to:

== Saint Vartan ==
- Saint Vartan (full name Vardan Mamikonian, 393–451 AD), Armenian military leader, martyr and saint of the Armenian Church
- St. Vartan Armenian Cathedral, Armenian Apostolic church in New York City

== Vartan ==
=== Mononym ===
- Sargis Mehrabyan, known as Commander Vartan, Armenian fedayee military commander and member of the Armenian Revolutionary Federation
- Vartan Pasha (full name Hovsep Vartanian or Osep Vartanian), Ottoman Armenian statesman, author and journalist of the 19th century
- Vartan Kurjian, an art director

=== Given name ===
- Vartan Ghazarian (born 1969), Lebanese-Armenian footballer
- Vartan Gregorian (1934–2021), Armenian-American academic
- Vartan Matiossian (born 1964), historian, translator, editor, and teacher
- Vartan Oskanian (born 1955), Armenian politician and Foreign Minister of Armenia (1998–2008) and founder of the Civilitas Foundation
- Vartan Vahramian, Iranian-Armenian artist

=== Surname ===
- John Vartan (1945–2004), American entrepreneur and educational philanthropist
- Kaloost Vartan (1839–1908), Turkish born Armenian physician of the Nazareth Hospital, the first hospital in Ottoman Galilee
- Michael Vartan (born 1968), French-American film and television actor
- Neil Vartan (1962–1994), English cricketer
- Sylvie Vartan (born 1944), French singer
- William Joshua Robertson Vartan (born 1992), Hotelier

=== Patronymic ===
- Tigran Vartanovich Petrosian (1929–1984), chess grandmaster and former world chess champion

== Wartan ==
=== Given name ===
- Wartan Oskanjan (1955), Armenian politician

=== Surname ===
- Aruth Wartan (1880–1945), a prolific Armenian-born actor and producer who was a star of the German silent film era

== See also ==
- Bardas (disambiguation), the Hellenized form of the name
- Vardan (disambiguation), another spelling of the name (usually in Eastern Armenian)
- Vardanyan (disambiguation), includes Vartanian disambiguation
