= Ilie =

Ilie is a Romanian name. It is both a masculine given name, cognate of Elijah, and a surname.

The given name may refer to:

- Ilie Antonescu, Romanian general
- Ilie Baicu, Romanian football player
- Ilie Balaci, Romanian football player
- Ilie Bărbulescu, Romanian football player
- Ilie Bărbulescu, Romanian linguist
- Ilie Birt, Transylvanian merchant
- Ilie Bolojan, Romanian Prime Minister and Acting President of Romania
- Ilie Bratu, Moldovan politician
- Ilie Cazac, Moldovan political prisoner
- Ilie Cătărău, Romanian soldier
- Ilie Ceaușescu, Romanian politician
- Ilie Cebanu, Moldovan football player
- Ilie Ciocan, Romanian supercentenarian
- Ilie Codreanu, Romanian sport shooter
- Ilie Crețulescu, Romanian general
- Ilie Datcu, Romanian football player
- Ilie Dumitrescu, Romanian football player
- Ilie Enache, Romanian noble
- Ilie Floroiu, Romanian runner
- Ilie Ilașcu, Romanian politician
- Ilie Iordache, Romanian football player
- Ilie Lazăr, Romanian politician
- Ilie Matei, Romanian wrestler
- Ilie Motrescu, Romanian writer and publicist in Soviet Ukraine
- Ilie Murgulescu, Romanian scientist and politician
- Ilie Năstase, Romanian tennis player
- Ilie Pintilie, Romanian political activist
- Ilie Popa, Romanian mathematician
- Ilie Purcaru, Romanian writer
- Ilie I, Prince of Moldavia
- Ilie II Rareș, Prince of Moldavia
- Ilie Sârbu, Romanian politician
- Ilie Savu, Romanian football player
- Ilie Sánchez, Spanish football player
- Ilie Șerbănescu, Romanian economist
- Ilie Stan, Romanian tennis player
- Ilie Șteflea, Romanian general
- Ilie Subășeanu, Romanian football player
- Ilie Tudor, Romanian fencer
- Ilie Văduva, Romanian politician
- Ilie Verdeț, Romanian politician

The surname may refer to:

- Adrian Ilie, Romanian football player
- Adrian Ilie (footballer born 1981), Romanian football player
- Andrew Ilie, Romanian Australian tennis player
- Cleopa Ilie, Romanian cleric
- Cristian Ilie, Romanian politician
- Florin Ilie, Romanian football player
- Giulian Ilie, Romanian boxer
- Lucian Ilie, Romanian football player
- Mihai Ilie, Romanian football player
- Mircea Ilie, Romanian football player
- Sabin Ilie, Romanian football player
- Silviu Ilie, Romanian football player

== See also ==
- Ilieși (disambiguation)
