= Iliești =

Ilieşti may refer to several villages in Romania:

- Ilieşti, a village in Întregalde Commune, Alba County
- Ilieşti, a village in Ioneşti Commune, Gorj County

== See also ==
- Ilie (name)
- Ilieși (disambiguation)
