= Zovuni, Aragatsotn =

Zovuni Զովունի
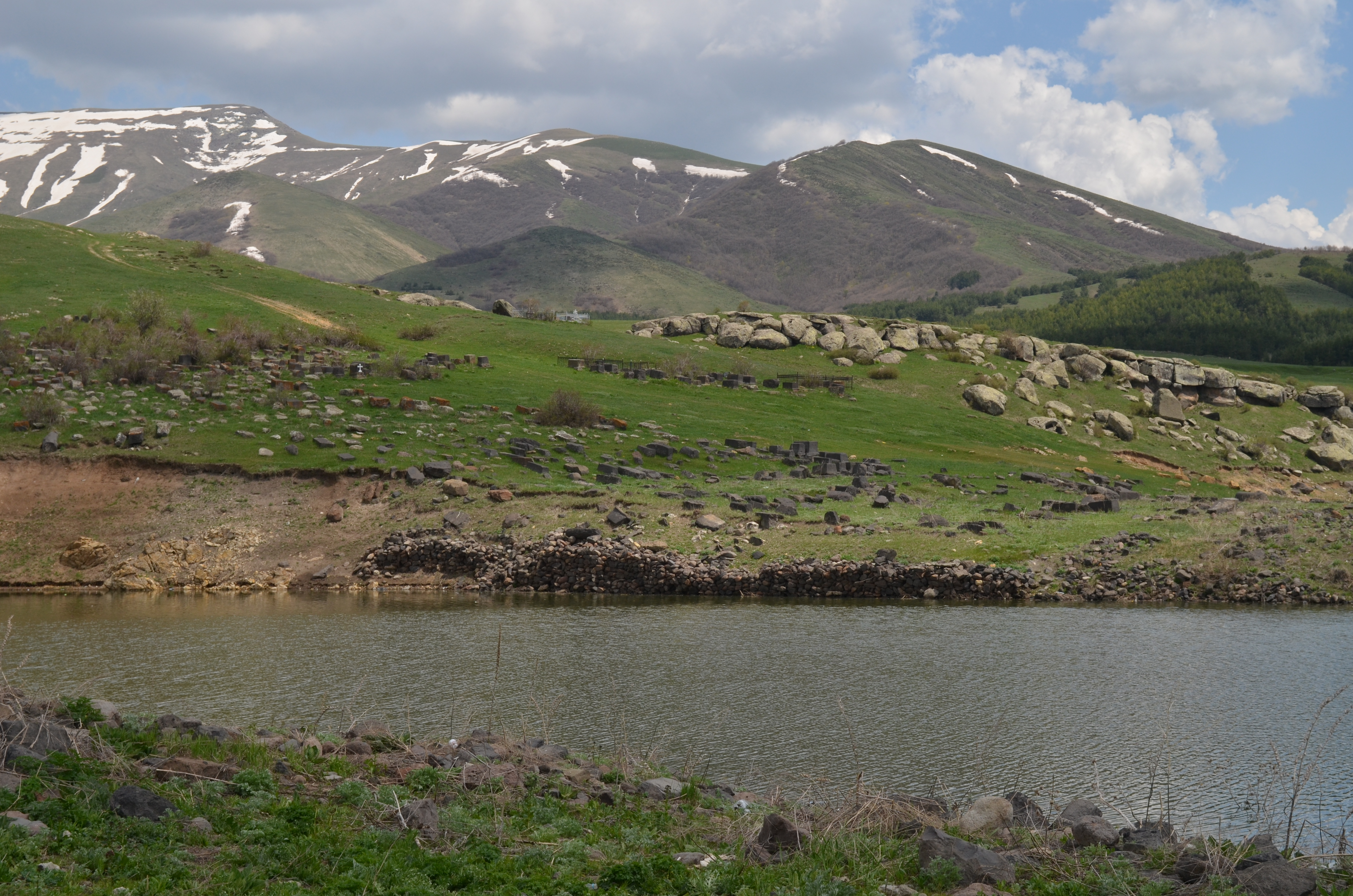
- The old cemetery and the remains of Zovuni

- Location within Armenia
- Coordinates: 40°30′39″N 44°25′44″E
- Country: Armenia
- Marz (Province): Aragatsotn
- Formed: 1828

Population (2015)
  - Total: 0
- Time zone: UTC+4 ( )

Zovuni (also, Molla Kasum), is an abandoned village in the Aragatsotn Province of Armenia. It was formed during the 1828 by Armenian migrants from the village of Akori in Western Armenia. The villages was abandoned in 1965 and its ruins now lie beneath the Aparan Reservoir.

The settlement is famous for the mausoleum of Vardan Mamikonian, the Poghos-Petros Church and the Tukh Manuk shrine.

The Zovuni cemetery sits to the east of the church, across a ravine. The monuments are near the village of Jrambar.

After the abandonment of the village, the population was moved to a new village called Zovuni, built at the northwestern suburbs of Yerevan, currently part of the Kotayk Province.

== Gallery ==
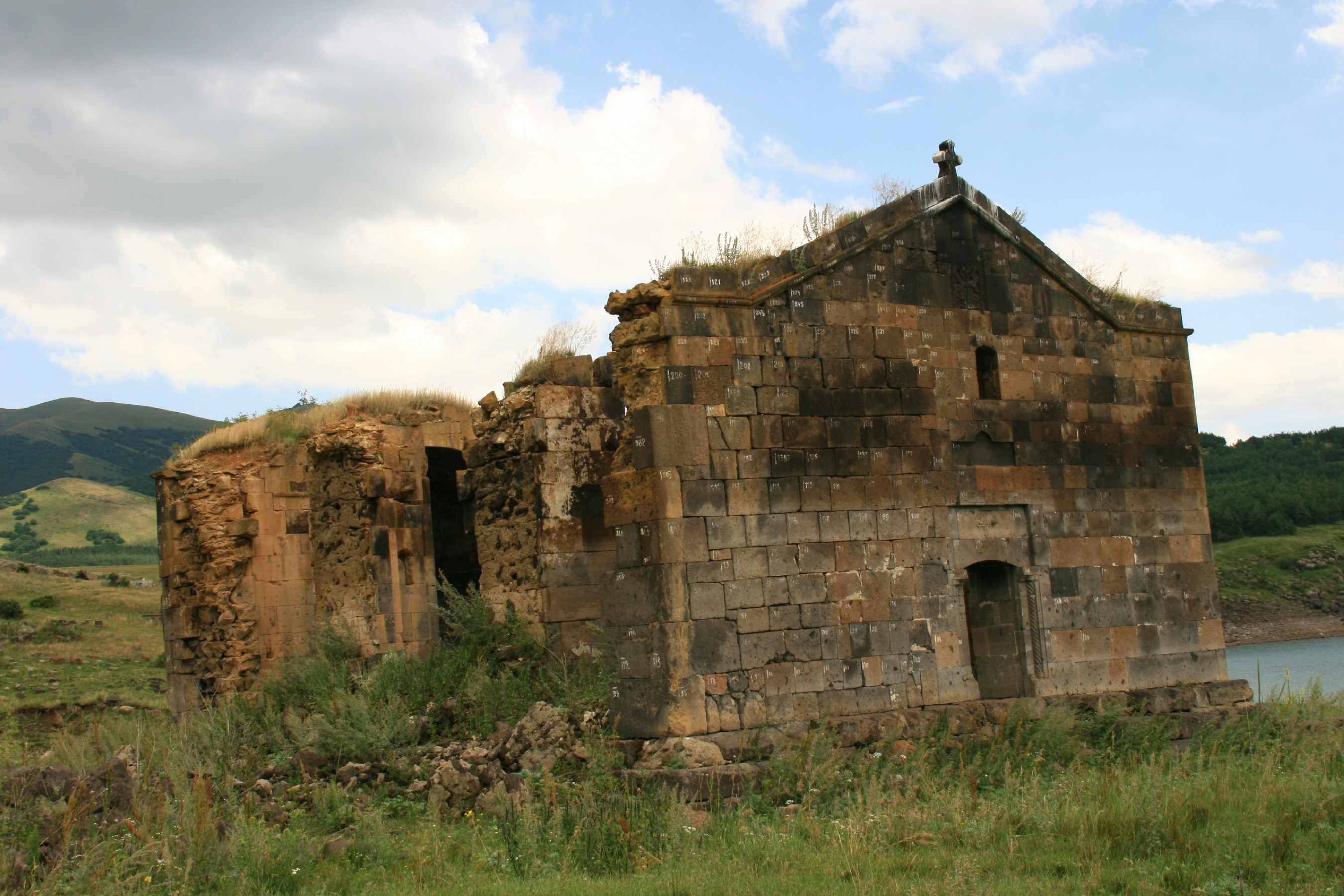
Poghos-Petros Church

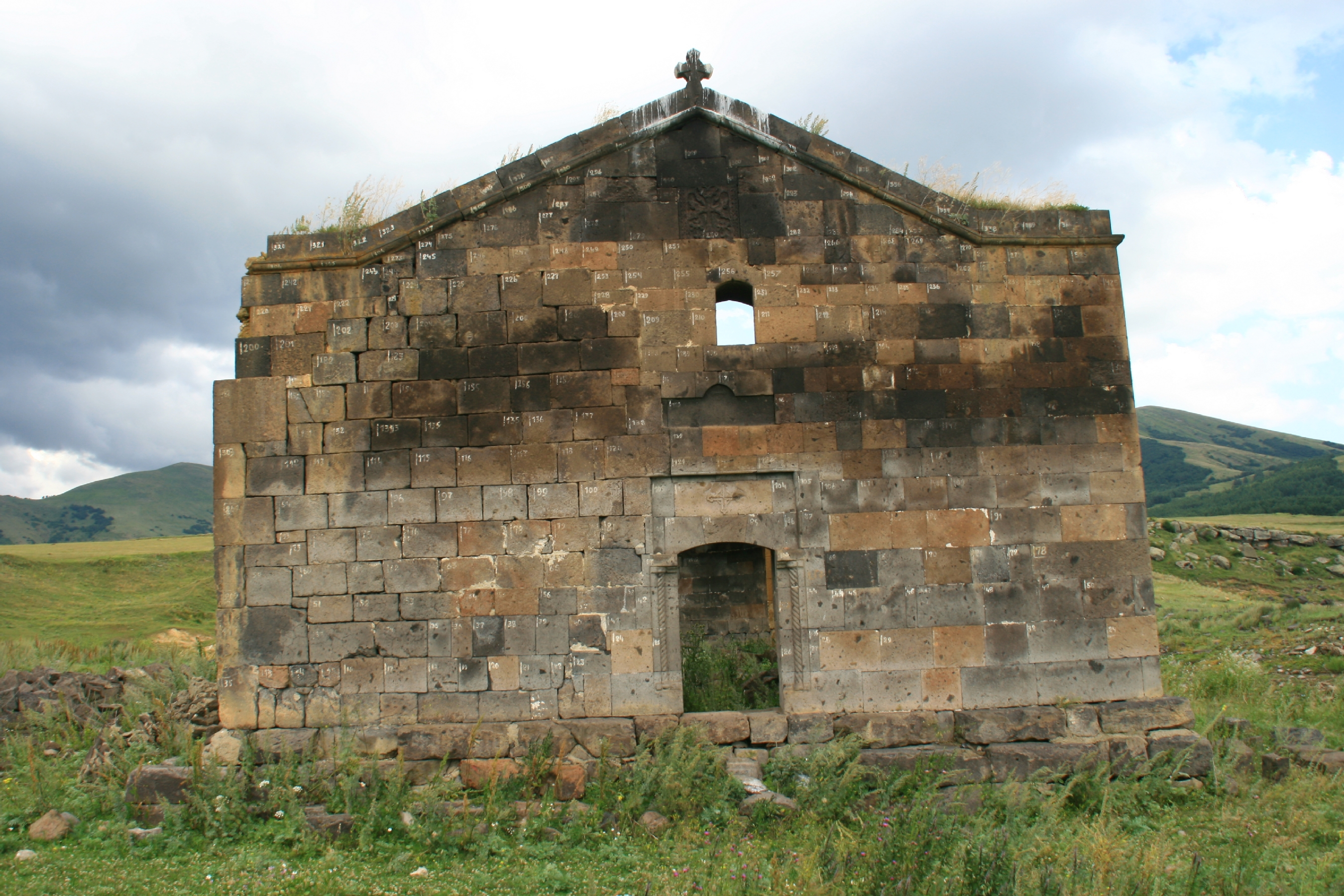
Poghos-Petros Church

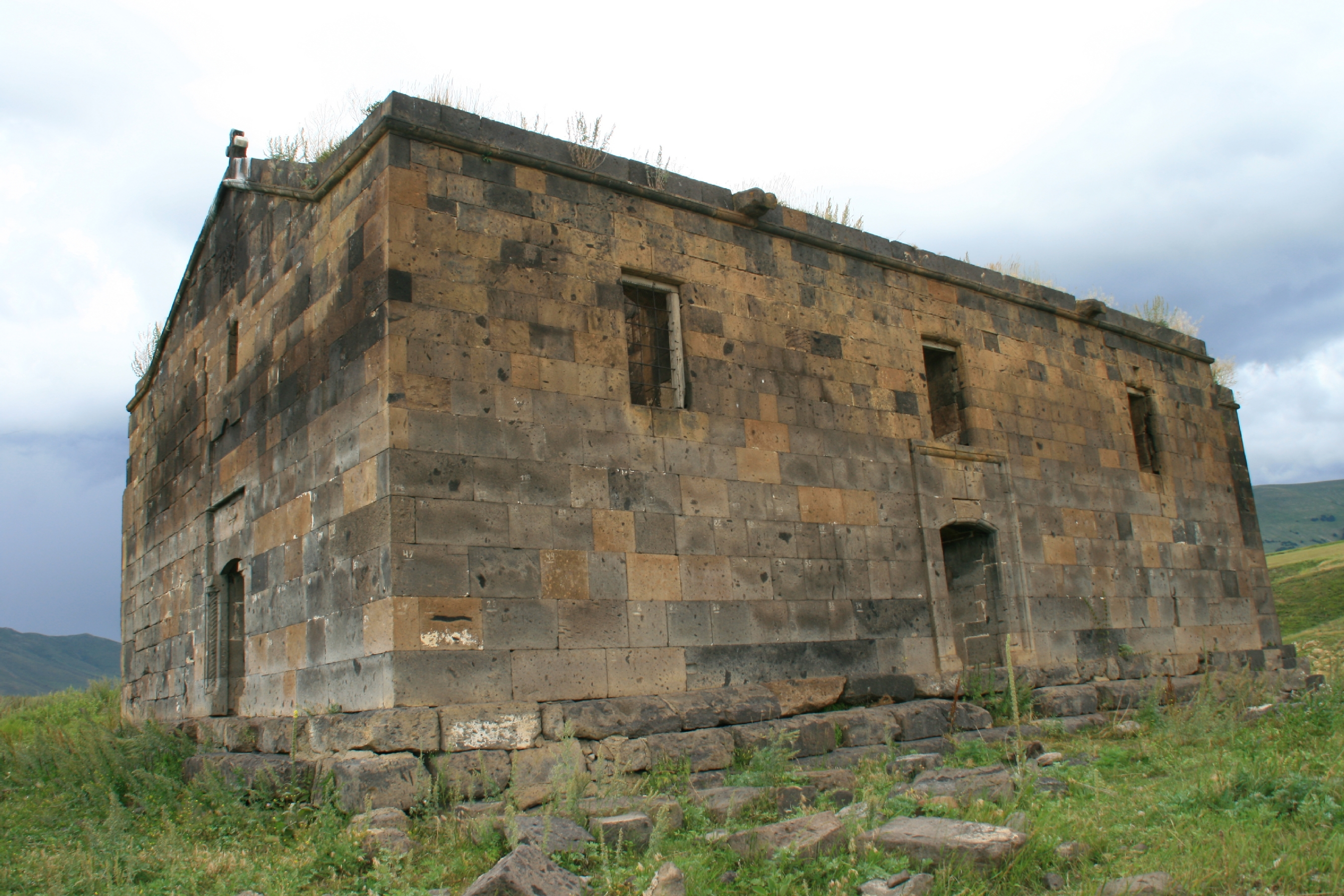
Poghos-Petros Church

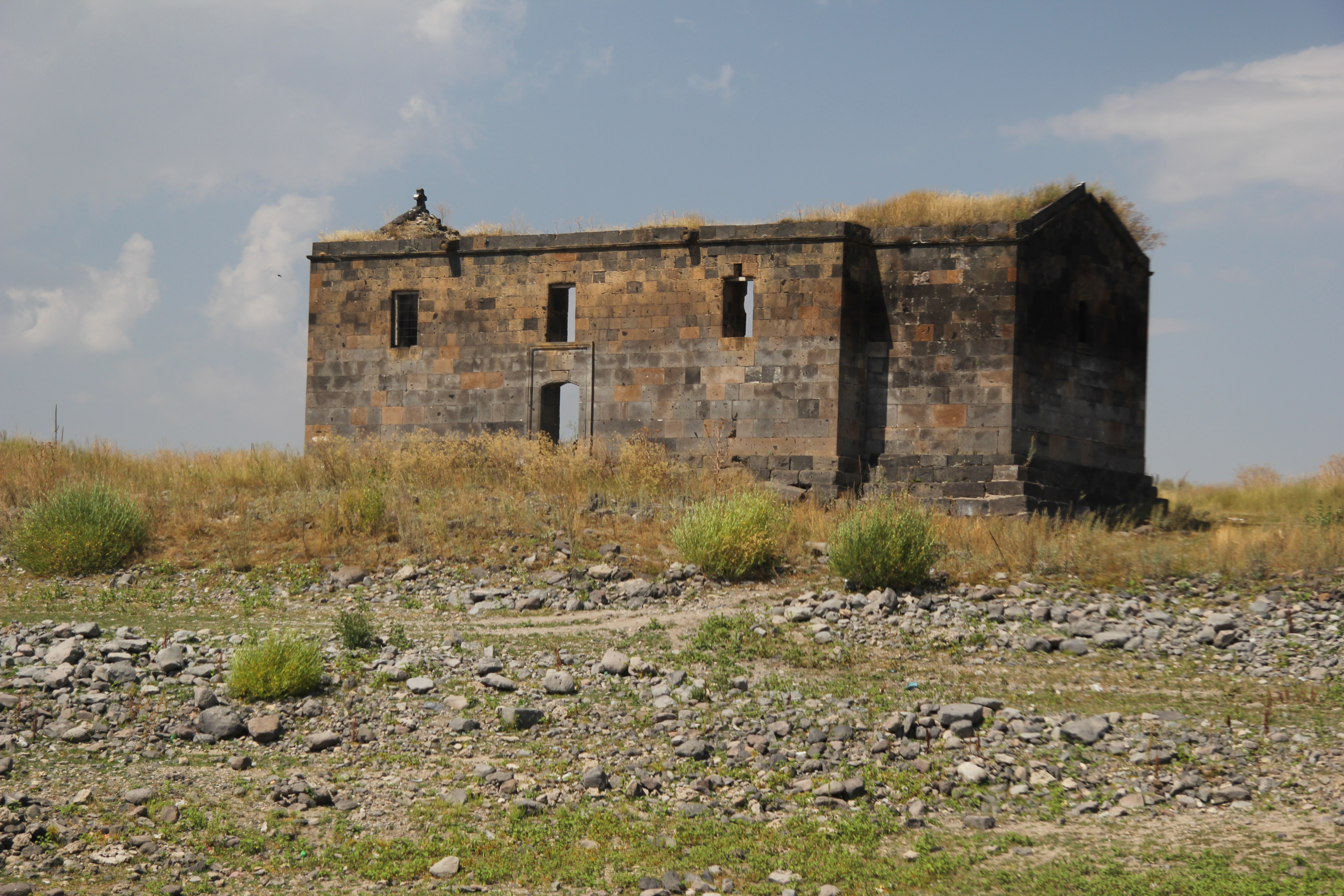
Poghos-Petros Church

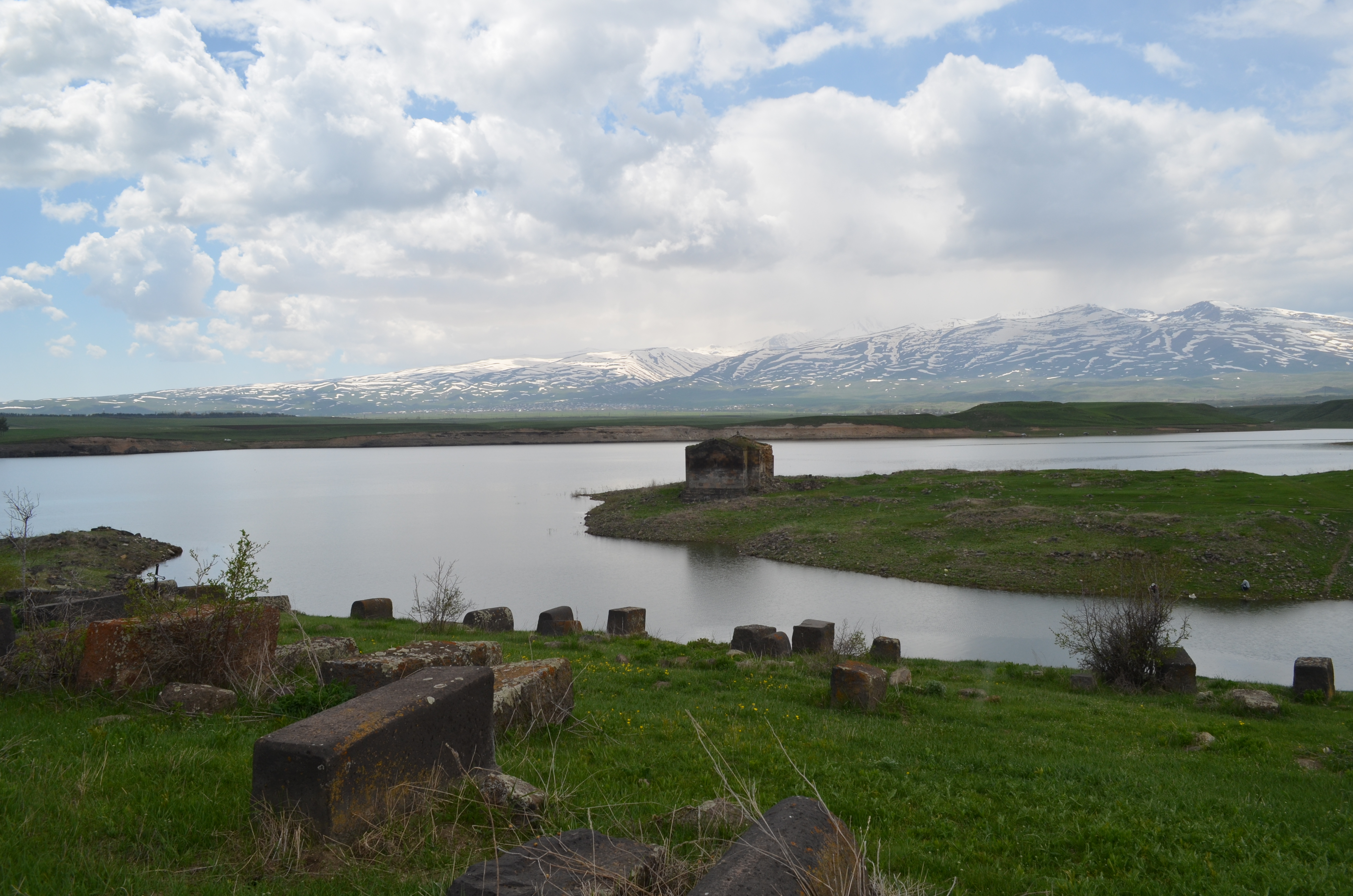
Cemetery and Poghos-Petros Church

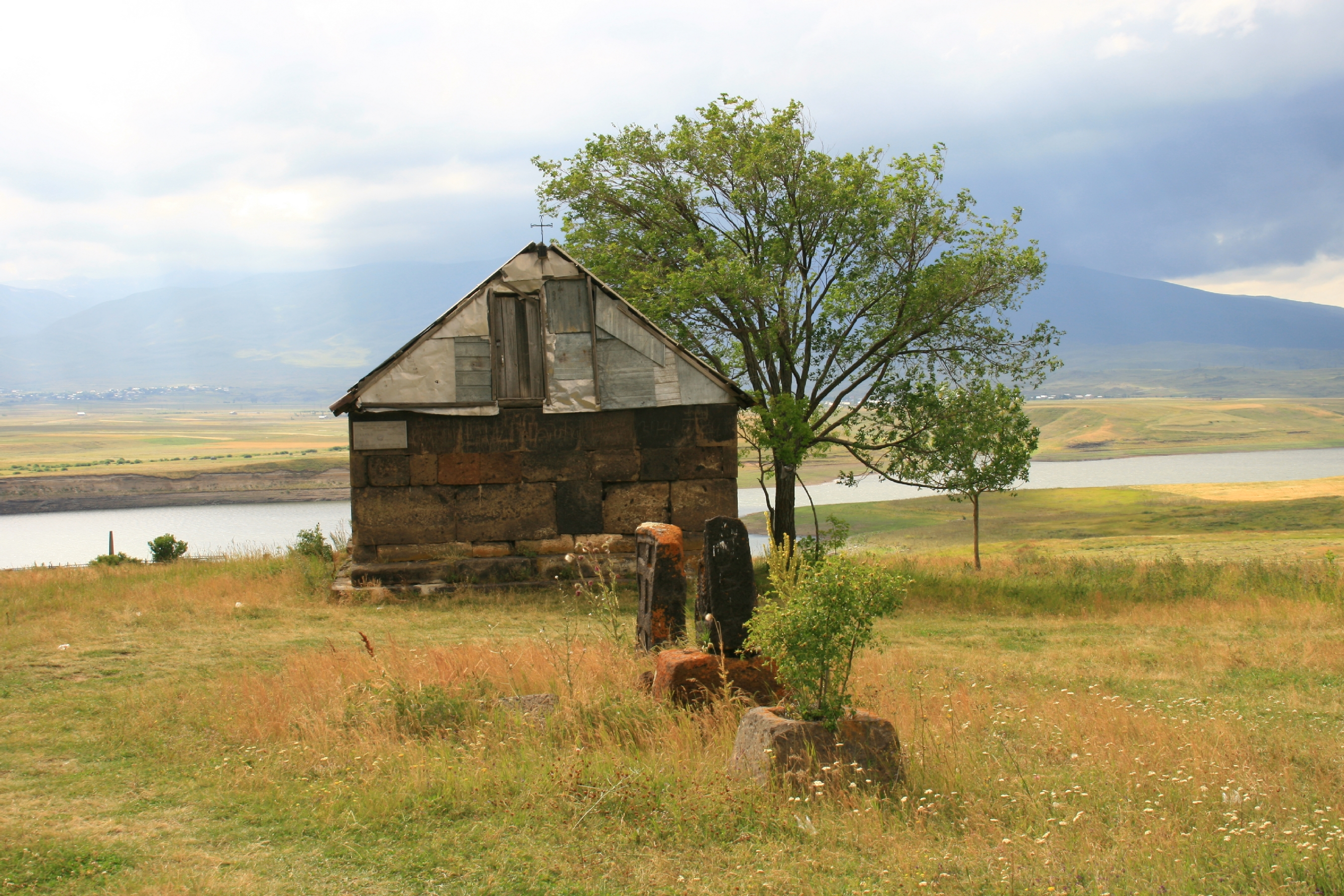
Tukh Manuk shrine
