= Bardas (disambiguation) =

Bardas (died 866) was uncle and regent of Emperor Michael III.

Bardas may also refer to:

- Bardas Phokas the Elder (died 968), Byzantine general
- Bardas Phokas the Younger (died 989), Byzantine general and rebel against Emperor Basil II
- Bardas Skleros (died 991), Byzantine general and rebel against Emperor Basil II
- Bardas Parsakoutenos, Byzantine general and grandson of Bardas Phokas the Elder
- Bardas Boilas (fl. 923), Byzantine strategos and rebel against Emperor Romanos I Lekapenos.

== See also ==
Saint Vartan (387–451), Armenian military leader and martyr
