= Ilieși =

Ilieși may refer to several villages in Romania:

- Ilieși, a village in Racova Commune, Bacău County
- Ilieși, a village, part the town of Sovata, Mureș County

== See also ==
- Ilie (name)
- Iliești (disambiguation)
