= Aknaghbyur =

Aknaghbyur Ակնաղբյուր
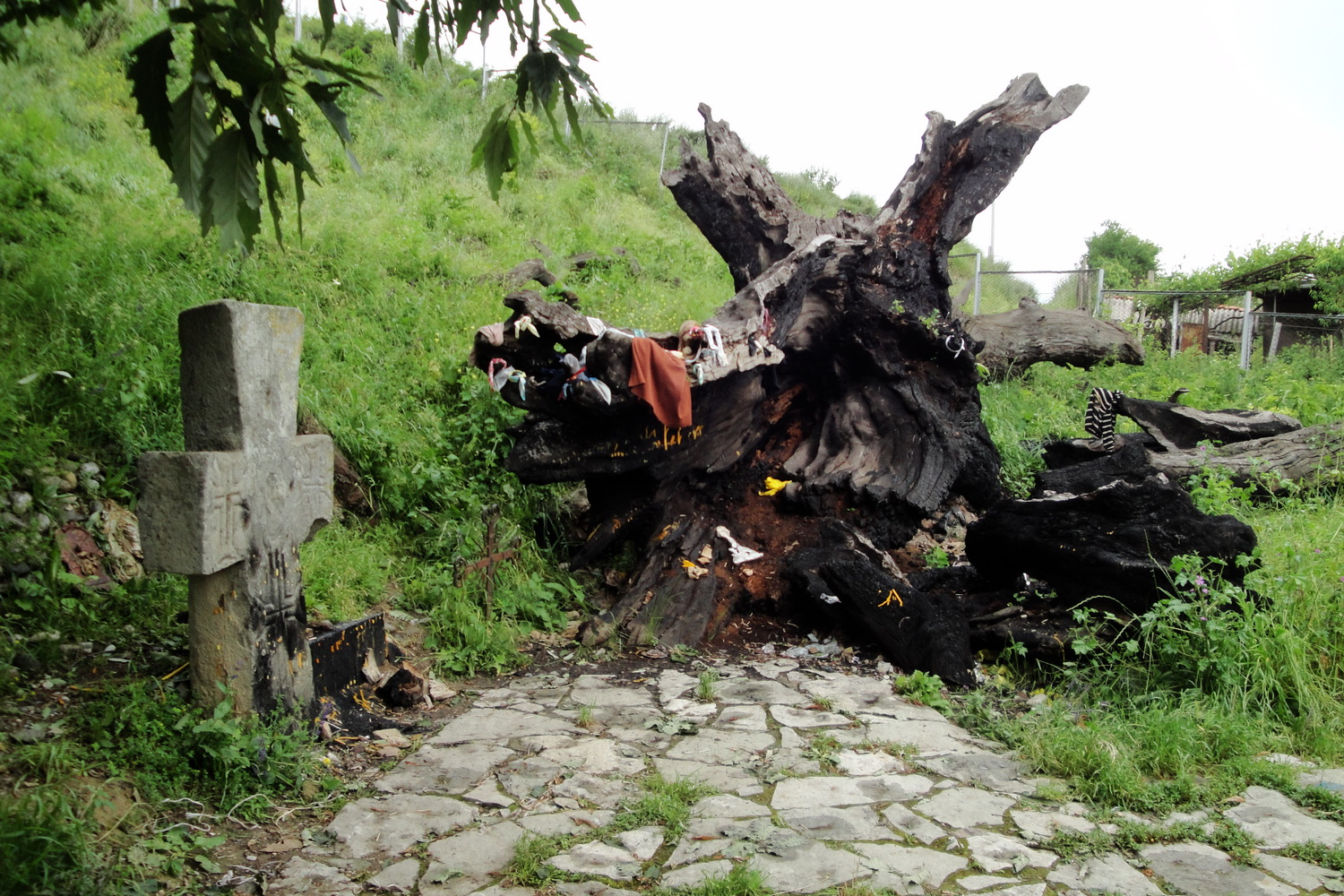
- Vardan Mamikonian's oak and khachkar in Aknaghbyur

- Location within Armenia Location within Tavush
- Coordinates: 40°57′30″N 45°09′23″E
- Country: Armenia
- Province: Tavush
- Municipality: Ijevan

Population (2011)
  - Total: 509
- Time zone: UTC+4 (AMT)

Aknaghbyur (Armenian: Ակնաղբյուր) is a village in the Ijevan Municipality of the Tavush Province of Armenia.

== Toponymy ==
The village was known as Nerkin Agdan and Nerkin Aghdan (rendered as Nizhniy Agdan in Russian) until 1967, and Morut from 1967 to 1970.

== History ==
Aknaghbyur was founded in 451 in honor of Vardan Mamikonian and is one of Armenia's oldest rural communities. In recent years, ArmeniaFund has launched and completed several vital projects on the infrastructure of the town, such as the construction of a gas pipeline and an irrigation system and the renovation of the drinking-water system.
