= Ruben Vardanyan =

Ruben Vardanyan may refer to:

- Ruben Vardanyan (politician) (born 1968), Armenian-Russian oligarch, politician and philanthropist
- Ruben Vardanyan (wrestler) (1929–1996), Armenian wrestler
