= Goar Vartanian =

Soviet-Armenian spy

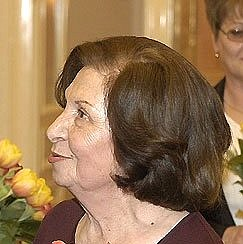
Vartanian in 2005

Goar Levonovna Vartanian (Armenian: Գոհար Լևոնի Վարդանյան Russian: Гоар Левоновна Вартанян; 25 January 1926 – 25 November 2019) was an Armenian woman who spied for the Soviet Union together with her husband Gevork Vartanian.

== Biography ==
Vartanian was born Goar Levonovna Pahlevanyan (Russian: Гоар Левоновна Пахлеванян), in Gyumri, in what was then the Transcaucasian Socialist Federative Soviet Republic in the Soviet Union and is now Armenia. After her family moved to Tehran, Iran in the early 1930s, she changed her surname to Kandaryan (Russian: Кандарян), where she met her future husband Gevork. She became a member of an anti-fascist group in 1942. They uncovered and prevented Operation Long Jump, an attempt by the Nazis to murder Joseph Stalin, Winston Churchill, and Franklin Roosevelt at the Tehran Conference in 1943.

In 1951 the Vartanians moved to the Soviet Union for which they worked as secret agents around the world. Goar's active career as a spy ended in 1986, but she continued training new recruits afterwards. Gevork, who had received the title of Hero of the Soviet Union, died in 2012. Goar died on 25 November 2019 and is buried in the Troyekurovskoye Cemetery.
