= Varden =

Varden may refer to:

== People ==
- Erik Varden (born 1974), Norwegian Roman Catholic prelate
- Evelyn Varden (1893-1958), American actress
- Helga Varden, American-Norwegian philosopher
- Norma Varden (1898-1989), English actress
- Varden Tsulukidze (1865–1923), Georgian military commander and anti-Soviet resistance leader

== Places ==
- Varden Conservation Area, a state park in Pennsylvania in the United States
- Varden, Stavanger, a neighborhood in the city of Stavanger in Rogaland county, Norway
- Varden Amfi, a football venue in Bergen, Norway

== Other ==
- IL Varden, a multi-sports club in Meråker, Norway
- Varden (newspaper), a Norwegian publication
- The Varden, a group of rebels in The Inheritance Cycle series of fantasy novels

== See also ==
- Vardan
- Dolly Varden (disambiguation)
