= Ernest Vardanean =

Journalist from Armenia

- Born: 11 May 1980 (age 46); Yerevan, Armenian SSR, Soviet Union
- Education: Moldova State University
- Occupation: Journalist

Ernest Vardanean (born 11 May 1980) is a journalist and political scientist who lives in the breakaway Moldovan region of Transnistria. He was arrested on 7 April 2010 by the self-proclaimed forces in Tiraspol charged of high treason in favor of the Republic of Moldova.

== Biography ==
Ernest Vardanean was born in Yerevan, Armenian SSR. His family moved to Moldavian Soviet Socialist Republic after the 1988 Armenian earthquake. Vardanean graduated from the Faculty of Political Science of the Moldova State University; he speaks five languages. He ran in the 2005 election for Parliament of Transnistria, but his campaign failed. He is one of the founders of the Transnistrian Armenians Union and is a member of the organisation's board.

Vardanean worked for the Russian Internet news agency Novy Region in Tiraspol. In 2009, he also started to work for the Chișinău-based newspaper Puls, which caused irritation among Transnistrian authorities. He was known in Moldova for his often critical reporting on state officials and matters of public interest. In 2009, Vardanean was selected for a position in the United Nations Secretariat.

Vardanean is married to Irina Vardanean (maiden name – Lazăr), who comes from the Moldovan town of Rezina. They have a son, Arutiun, born in 2003, and a daughter, Carina, born in 2009. The family lives in Chișinău, where Vardanean is a lecturer at the Moldova State University.

== Reactions to arrest ==
On 7 April, a group of armed agents from PMR's Ministry of State Security arrested Vardanean in front of his home in Tiraspol and has been accused of working for the Moldovan intelligence in Chişinău. On 11 May, he was shown on Transnistrian state television confessing to being a spy. Vardanean said he was recruited by Nicolae Botezatu, an official with the Moldovan Intelligence and Security Service, in May 2001 when he was a fourth-year student at Chişinău University. Vardanean's lawyer said his client was forced to confess to something he did not do (he believes the journalist was forced to make the confession in exchange for a meeting with his wife Irina). His family and friends also believe he was forced to confess under pressure.

On 21 April 2010, the European Union Heads of Mission in Chişinău expressed their deep concern that the journalist Ernest Vardanean, who was arrested by the Transnistrian security forces, had been denied basic human rights.

Oliver Vujović, the Secretary General of the South East Europe Media Organisation, said: "The accusations against Vardanian of high treason due to critical reporting are unacceptable... SEEMO urges the Ministry of Security in Tiraspol to withdraw the charges and the prison sentence. SEEMO would also like to remind the Ministry of Security in Tiraspol that an open media environment, allowing for the free flow of information, is a fundamental principle of any democratic society."

"Reporters Without Borders reiterates its dismay about Vardanean's detention and treatment and calls for his release. In the meantime, it urges the authorities to allow him to see his lawyer, so that the proceedings can start running along legal lines."

The Committee to Protect Journalists "calls for Ernest Vardanian’s release": "the farcical footage aired on the local state television proves nothing else but the pressure to which this journalist has been subjected".

"I am asking the High Representative for Foreign Affairs and the EU Head of Delegation to Moldova to act urgently for the immediate release of the detained journalist" said Traian Ungureanu in the European Parliament on 19 May 2010. Another member of the European Parliament, Cristian Preda, explained: "I would like to say that this action is used by the authorities in Tiraspol to intimidate Chişinău at a time when the new government which took office after last year's elections would like to move closer to the European Union and also resolve the Transnistrian conflict. I am calling for the immediate, unconditional release of the journalist Ernest Vardanian, and I urge the authorities in the self-proclaimed Republic of Transnistria to make a move towards Chişinău to resolve the conflict there."

Ernest Vardanean and Ilie Cazac were visited on 4 August 2010 in jail by the head of the Organization for Security and Co-operation in Europe's mission to Moldova, Philip Remmler. Ilie Cazac, 24, was arrested by Transdniester police on 22 March 2010 in his hometown, Bender, on charges of spying for Moldova.

At the beginning of August 2010, civil activists in the Armenian city of Gyumri have started to collect signatures demanding the release of Vardanean.

== Release ==
In May 2011 Igor Smirnov signed a decree saying that Vardanean could be released from prison. After that, Ernest Vardanean and his family moved to Chișinău, where he is a university lecturer and blogger.
