= Ara Vardanyan (administrator) =

Armenian executive (born 1977)

Ara Vardanyan (Armenian: Արա Վարդանյան) (born on December 16, 1977) was the executive director of the Hayastan All-Armenian Fund (2007-2018)

In 1999, he graduated from the University of Linguistics, in Yerevan, Armenia. Between 2000 and 2002, Vardanyan worked for the Armenian Ministry of Commerce and Economic Development, Department for Relations with International Organizations and from 2002 to 2004, was the head of Department for Relations with the World Trade Organization and the European Union in the same ministry.

In 2004 he was appointed head of foreign relations with the Hayastan All-Armenian Fund and vice president of the fund starting in 2006. In 2008, he was appointed as head of the executive administration of the fund, and in 2009, the fund's executive director. His appointment was renewed in 2012.

Since the summer of 2018 Vardanyan is under criminal prosecution on the grounds of embezzlement. Particularly, in the summer of 2018, Vardanyan has been charged with embezzlement and as a means of deterrence a bail has been applied against him. Later, in 2019, a new episode of embezzlement has been revealed by the National Security Service of Armenia and the charges brought against Vardanyan have been modified. According to the new charges, Vardanyan is charged with embezzlement and abuse of powers by an official of a non-profit organization. Vardanyan, who had been detained within the scope of the case, has been released on bail.
