= Lucian Ilie =

Romanian footballer

Personal information
- Date of birth: 14 October 1967 (age 59)
- Place of birth: Dâmbovița, Romania
- Position: Midfielder

Senior career*
Years	Team	Apps	(Gls)
1987–1989	Rapid București	44	(2)
1989–1990	Jönköpings Södra	20	(6)
1990–1991	Mechelen	4	(0)
1991–1992	FC Wageningen	16	(1)
1992–1993	Groningen	32	(1)
1993–1995	Veendam	62	(3)
1995–1997	FC Zwolle	64	(11)
1998–2000	Veendam	49	(1)
2001–2003	DVS '33	30	(7)
Total		321	(32)

International career
1989	Romania U21	1	(0)
- * Club domestic league appearances and goals

Lucian Ilie (born 14 October 1967) is a Romanian retired footballer who played as a midfielder.

== Club career ==
Ilie was born on 14 October 1967 in Dâmbovița, Romania. He started his senior career at Rapid București, making his Divizia A debut on 13 December 1987, when coach Ion Dumitru sent him in the 72nd minute to replace Fănel Țîră in a 4–0 loss to rivals Steaua București. The team suffered relegation at the end of the 1988–89 season. Subsequently, he made five appearances in the 1989 Intertoto Cup, scoring a goal in a 3–1 defeat to Spartak Varna. Seeking to escape Romania's communist regime, Ilie and his teammates Gabriel Ciolponea and Alexandru Aprodu fled their hotel on 19 July 1989, following a 2–0 loss to Örgryte, to request political asylum in Sweden. They were helped by Adrian Oprișan, a former Sportul Studențesc București player who defected four years earlier. Oprișan also helped them secure contracts with Jönköpings Södra.

In 1990, Ilie went to play for Belgian side Mechelen, moving one year later to Dutch Eerste Divisie club FC Wageningen. Subsequently, he joined Groningen, making his Eredivisie debut on 16 August 1992 under coach Pim Verbeek in a 1–1 draw against Willem II. On 6 December, he scored his only goal in the competition in a 2–0 away win over Den Bosch. He also played in both legs of the 2–1 aggregate loss to Vác in the first round of the 1992–93 UEFA Cup. In 1993, Ilie went back to Eerste Divisie football at Veendam. Two years later, he moved to FC Zwolle only to return to Veendam two seasons later. From 2000 to 2003, Ilie played for amateur club DVS '33, retiring afterwards.

== International career ==
Ilie played one game for Romania's under-21 team on 16 May 1989 in a 1–1 draw against Bulgaria.
