= Ruben Vardanyan (wrestler) =

Armenian wrestler (1929–1996)

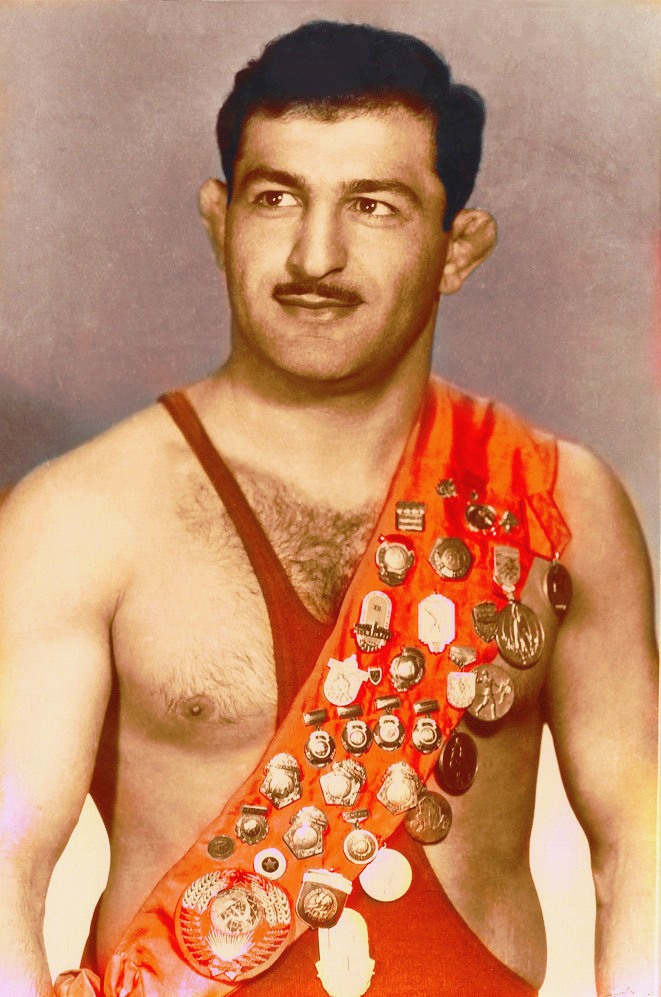
- A well known Armenian wrestler, tenfold Champion of the Republic of Armenia, Champion of the USSR, Honored Coach of the Republic of Armenia, Honorary member of the Olympic Committee.

Sport
- Sport: Wrestling

Ruben Vardanayn (Armenian: Ռուբեն Վարդանյան, 26 May 1929 – 21 December 1996) was a well known Armenian wrestler, Champion of the Republic of Armenia, Champion of the USSR, Honored Coach of the Republic of Armenia, Honorary member of the Olympic Committee.

== Biography ==
Vardanyan was born in 1929 in Yerevan. After studying graduating at the Yerevan State Institute of Physical Culture from 1948 to 1953 and graduating, he continued his studies from 1958 to 1963 at Yerevan State University at the faculty of law.

He entered into wrestling in 1946. In the same year, taking part in the Championship of Armenia he became the Champion of the Republic. 9 times more he took the first place of honored champion of Armenia. Vardanyan is considered to be the first master of sport of the post-war Armenia.

In 1952 Vardanyan participated in the USSR Championship and took the 2nd place, and in 1953 he won the Gold Medal of the USSR Champion. He is the second prize-winner of the 1954 World Student Games in Budapest.

During the period of his sporting biography Vardanyan had 665 wrestling bouts, 627 of which ended in win, and 23 times out of 24 he stood on the highest honored podium of the International Competitions.

Starting in 1948, Vardanyan was engaged in the educational activities too. He trained hundreds of leading sportsmen, more than 20 masters of sport, a number of which became winners and prize-winners of the former USSR as well as of the other International Competitions.

From 1956 to 1962 Vardanyan worked as a teacher at Yerevan State Institute of Physical Training. Highly appreciating were Vardanyan’s sporting activities, that in 1964 he was awarded the title of The Honored Coach of the Republic of Armenia.

After leaving the active sport from 1962 to 1992 he was the Head of ”Ashkhatank” Voluntary Sport Society and later Yerevan City Council of the United Sport Society of the Trade Unions.

Vardanyan is well known in Armenia and the rest of the world.

Vardanyan is the founder of Youthful Sport School of the Olympic reserve on wrestling, a sport center where a great number of masters of sport, champions of Armenia, USSR, Europe, World and Olympic Games have been trained.

Vardanyan is the first Armenian International Extra Category Referee. Since 1969 as an International Referee he has been authorized to officiate a great number of important competitions like the European and World Championships, the Olympic Games at Munich, Montreal and Moscow. For the best refereeing he has been awarded the FILA Silver Medal. More than 20 years the name of Ruben Vardanyan was in the list of 10 best referees of the World and the Soviet Union.

Highly appreciating Vardanyan’s outstanding contribution to the development of the Republic’s physical training and sport he was awarded "The Medal for Work Heroism”, Diploma of Supreme Soviet of the Republic of Armenia, a number of medals of the Republic Council of the Trade Unions and the USSR Sport Committee. Vardanyan's name is listed in the Honorary Book of the USSR Sport Committee.

Taking into account Vardanyan’s many years and valuable contribution to the development of wrestling in Armenia, as well as with the purpose to perpetuate his memory, the Youthful Sport School of the Olympic Reserve on Wrestling at the ”Hayastan” Sport Society of the Trade Unions is named after Ruben Vardanyan.

== Awards and achievements ==
- 1946 - 1957 Champion of the Republic of Armenia
- 1952 2nd place in the USSR Championship
- 1953 Gold Medal of Champion of the USSR
- 1954 Second prize-winner in the World Student Games(Budapest)
- 1964 Honored Coach of the Republic of Armenia
- 1982 Silver Medal of International Wrestling Federation for excellent referring
- 1983 Medal of ”Work Heroism”
- 1980 Diploma of Supreme Soviet of the Republic of Armenia
- A number of medals of the Republic Council of the Trade Unions and USSR Sport Committee
- Inscribed in the Honorary Book of the USSR Sport Committee
- Honorary member of the Olympic Committee

== Remembrance ==
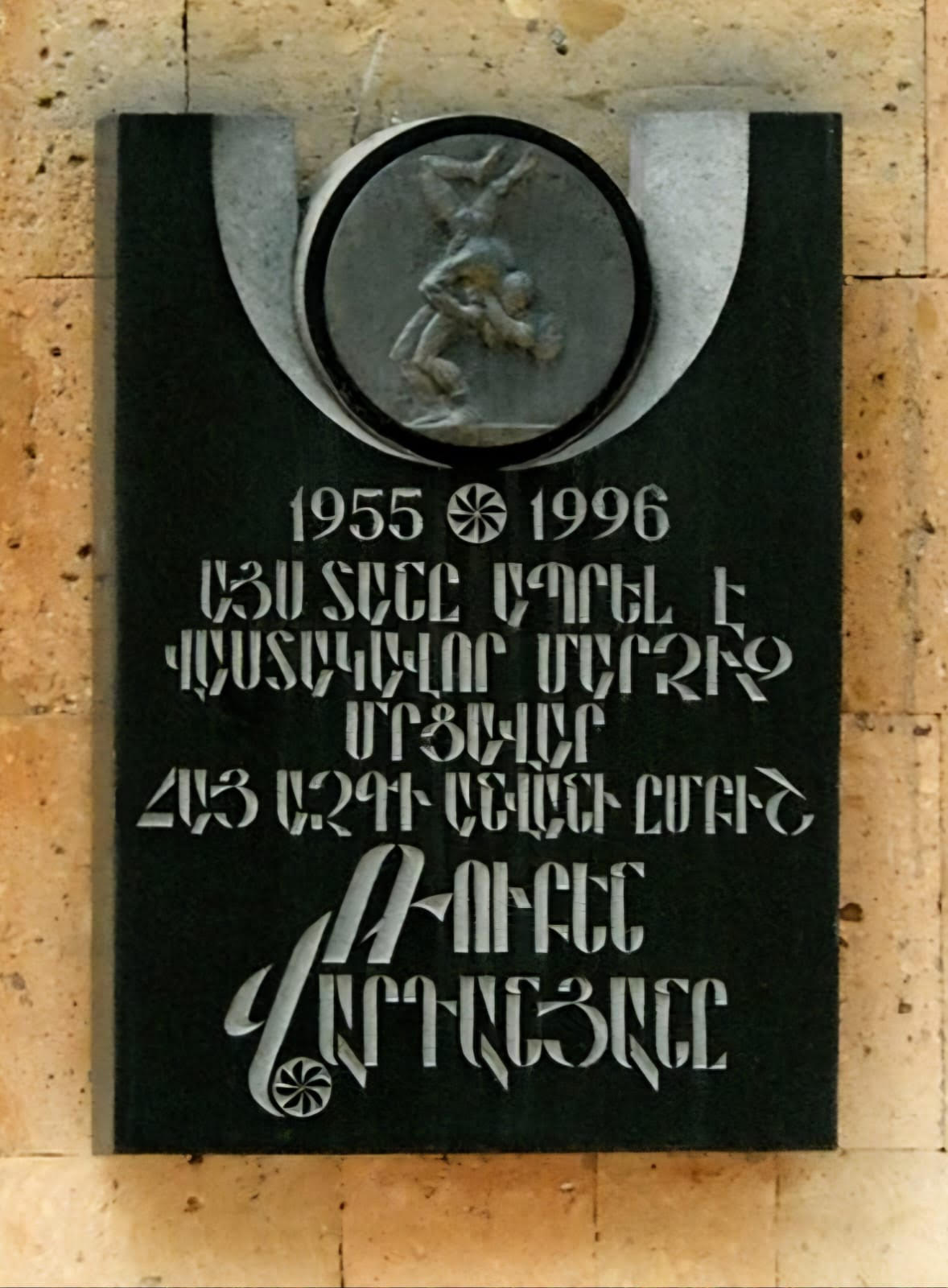
7 Kievyan str, Yerevan: “In 1955-1996, the honored trainer, judge, and famous Armenian wrestler Ruben Vardanyan lived in this house.”

Praising Ruben V. Vardanyan career path in sport and, in particular, his contribution to World Wrestling development, the "Armenia" Sport Union Junior Olympic Wrestling "Work" school was named after Ruben Vardanyan.

In 1999, Yerevan municipality decided to place a memorial plaque on the building where Vardanyan lived from 1955-1996 Vardanyan. His name was placed on the plaque.
