= Gevork Vartanian =

Soviet intelligence officer (1924–2012)

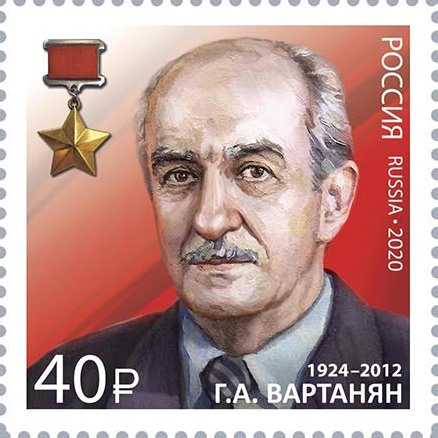
- Vartanian on a 2020 Russian stamp
- Born: Gevork Andreevich Vartanian; 17 February 1924; Nor Nakhichevan, USSR
- Died: 10 January 2012 (aged 87); Moscow, Russia
- Awards: Hero of the Soviet Union
- Espionage activity
- Service years: 1940–1992
- Codename: Anri
- Operations: Operation Long Jump

Gevork Andreevich Vartanian (Armenian: Գևորգ Վարդանյան, Russian: Гево́рк Андре́евич Вартаня́н; 17 February 1924 – 10 January 2012) was a Soviet intelligence officer.

He was primarily responsible, together with his wife Goar Vartanian, for thwarting Operation Long Jump, concocted by Adolf Hitler, headed by Ernst Kaltenbrunner, and led by Otto Skorzeny, which was an alleged attempt to assassinate Stalin, Churchill, and Roosevelt at the Tehran Conference in 1943.

== Early life ==
Vartanian was born to Armenian parents in Nor Nakhichevan, USSR. His father, also a Soviet intelligence agent, was sent to Persia in 1930, where he worked for 23 years under cover of being a wealthy merchant. Gevork Vartanian was not even 16 when he went into intelligence.

On 4 February 1940, he made contact with the Tehran residency of Soviet intelligence, including Ivan Agayants. In Tehran, Vartanian formed a pro-Soviet group, who were identified by Iranian police in 1941, which led him to spend three months in prison.

== Operation Long Jump ==
In 1942 the Nazis intercepted intelligence about a planned meeting in Tehran and devised a scheme to capture or assassinate Stalin, Churchill, and Roosevelt.

After careful planning and deliberation under the personal supervision of Security Police Chief Ernst Kaltenbrunner, Hitler sent his special commando agent, Otto Skorzeny, along with six other men to rendezvous at Tehran and spearhead the operation.

The first tip-off about the planned attempt came from Soviet intelligence agent Nikolai Kuznetsov, under the alias of Wehrmacht Oberleutnant Paul Siebert, from Nazi-occupied Ukraine. Kuznetsov got a drunk SS officer named Ulrich von Ortel to tell him about the attempt. Although the scheduled date of the operation was not known, the fact that it would take place was confirmed. Vartanian had been assigned to recruit agents since 1940.

In 1940–41 Vartanian's team of seven intelligence officers had identified more than 400 Nazi agents, all of whom had been arrested by Soviet troops. In the autumn of 1943, they were assigned the task of ensuring the security for the upcoming Tehran Conference. In their efforts to foil the assassination plot devised by the Nazis, Vartanian's group located six Nazi radio operators shortly before the conference opened on 28 November 1943. The German assassins had been dropped by parachute near the town of Qom, 40 miles (64 km) from Tehran. Vartanian later said:

We followed them to Tehran, where the Nazi field station had readied a villa for their stay. They were travelling by camel, and were loaded with weapons. While we were watching the group, we established that they had contacted Berlin by radio, and recorded their communication... When we decrypted these radio messages, we learnt that the Germans were preparing to land a second group of subversives for a terrorist act — the assassination or abduction of the 'Big Three'. The second group was supposed to be led by Skorzeny himself.

All the members of the first group were arrested and forced to contact their handlers under Soviet supervision. The operation got off track and the main group led by Skorzeny never went to Tehran.

== Later years ==
On 30 June 1946, Vartanian married Goar Levonovna. In 1955, Vartanian graduated from the Institute of Foreign Languages, Yerevan. He then spent three decades doing espionage activities in Japan, China, India, France, Italy, United States and West Germany. He was awarded the title Hero of the Soviet Union in 1984.

In 2003, relying on declassified documents, Yuri Lvovich Kuznets published a book called Tehran-43 or Operation Long Jump, which detailed Vartanian's role at the Tehran Conference. A Soviet film, Teheran 43, which featured the French actor Alain Delon, was released in 1981.

In 2007 he met with Winston Churchill's granddaughter and was congratulated for his great service to the Allies. Vartanian has been interviewed many times. Al Gurnov of Russia Today interviewed Vartanian on the eve of the Victory Day parade, which was broadcast on 9 May 2008. It was revealed that Vartanian's identity was kept secret until 2000.

== Death ==
Gevork Vartanian died at 87 at Botkin Hospital in Moscow on 10 January 2012. Russian Prime Minister Vladimir Putin attended the funeral and paid his respects to Vartanian's widow Goar, a fellow intelligence officer, who died on 25 November 2019.

Condolences were also expressed by the President of Armenia Serzh Sargsyan, Prime Minister of Armenia Tigran Sargsyan, and President of the Nagorno-Karabakh Republic Bako Sahakyan.

== Legacy ==
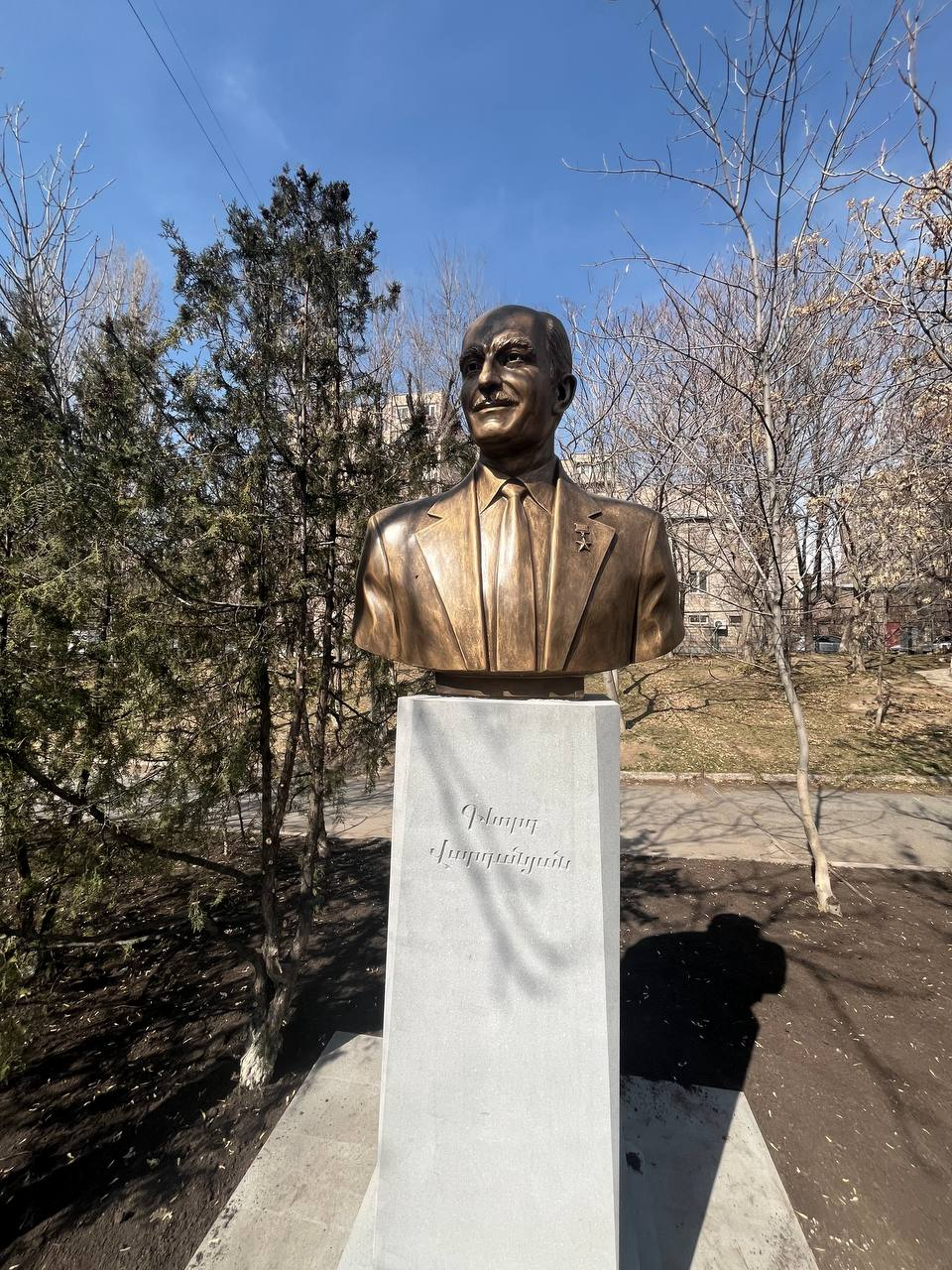
Monument to Gevorg Vartanyan near Yerevan school No.192

- October 24, 2012 and in Moscow at the Troekurovsky cemetery, the opening of the monument to Vartanyan took place. The author of the monument sculptural composition was the People's Artist of Russia, laureate of the state Prize, member of the Council for Culture under the President of Russia A. N. Kovalchuk. The ceremony was attended by veterans of the SVR of Russia, cultural and artistic figures, friends and relatives of the scout.
- October 27, 2012 and in Rostov-on-Don a solemn ceremony of laying a nominal "Star" to Gevorg Vartanyan took place on the Avenue of Stars.
- In 2013, the Ministry of Defense of Armenia established the departmental medal "Gevorg Vardanyan" in memory of the intelligence officer. Materials about the operations of the Vartanyan spouses are presented at the Museum of the History of the Security Agencies of Armenia.
- In the center of Yerevan, on the building of Yerevan State Linguistic University named after Valery Bryusov (Tumanyan Street, 42), on May 17, 2014, a memorial plaque was erected in memory of its 1955 graduate Gevork Vartanyan.
- On May 31, 2022, a monument to the Soviet intelligence officer was unveiled in New Moscow on the territory of School No. 2070 named after Hero of the Soviet Union G.A. Vartanyan.
