= Vartan (disambiguation) =

Vartan is an Armenian given name and a surname.

Vartan may also refer to:

- Värtan
- Vartan (comics), Italian comic book created and drawn by Sandro Angiolini
- Vartan, Iran, village in Isfahan Province, Iran
