= Moruț =

Moruț may refer to several villages in Romania:

- Moruț, a village in Matei Commune, Bistrița-Năsăud County
- Moruț, a village in the town of Sărmașu, Mureș County
