= Ilie Cazac =

- Born: 1985 (age 40–41); Cimișeni, Criuleni District
- Education: ULIM
- Occupation: Civil servant
- Parent(s): Stela Surchicean and Alexandru Viniţchi (adoptive father)

Ilie Cazac (born 1985, Tighina) is a former Moldovan tax inspector and political prisoner. He was arrested by representatives of the unrecognized Transnistria (the breakaway region of Moldova) in March 2010, being accused of high treason and espionage on behalf of Moldova. In February 2011, a court in Transnistria sentenced him to 14 years in prison. Among the institutions involved in his release in October 2011 were the UN High Commissioner for Human Rights, Navanethem Pillay, World Organization Against Torture, Organization for Security and Co-operation in Europe (OSCE), and the European Court of Human Rights.

== Biography ==
Ilie Cazac was a former employee of the Tighina-based Tax Inspectorate. He and his family live in Tighina town. Ilie Cazac was arrested by representatives of the so-called Ministry of Security of the breakaway republic of Transnistria on March 20, 2010, being accused of treason and espionage for Moldova. His family was not informed about his arrest and fate for two weeks. On April 21, 2010, Promo-LEX lodged the case of Ilie Cazac before the European Court of Human Rights. On June 15, 2010, the participants at the European Partnership Fair for Civil Society Organizations in Moldova, in Chişinău, agreed on a Resolution concerning the situation of Ilie Cazac and Ernest Vardanean. According to the World Organization Against Torture,

Ilie Cazac, a 25-year-old resident of Tighina (Bender), was arrested by members of the Ministry of State Security (MGB) of the unrecognized Transnistrian authorities, on 20 March 2010, allegedly tortured and ill-treated in custody, and later sentenced to 14 years in prison “for grand treason and espionage in favour of the Republic of Moldova”. He was detained in Tiraspol Penitentiary no.2, without access to an independent doctor.

His parents, Stela Surchicean and Alexandru Viniţchi, began a hunger strike in front of the Russian Embassy in Chișinău, on June 12, 2011. They called on the government of the Russian Federation to intervene on behalf of their son. On June 22, 2011, it was reported that the Head of the OSCE Mission to Moldova, Philip Remler, met Cazac and confirmed that he was in good condition. Moldovan Prime Minister Vlad Filat met the mother of Cazac, Stela Surchicean, on June 22. The ambassador of the Russian Federation, Valeri Kuzmin, when contacted by Cazac's parents, recommended that they address the authorities of Transnistria, rather than the international community. On June 25, 2010, the 14th day of the hunger strike, the mother of Ilie Cazac was admitted to the gastroenterology department of the Republican Hospital in Chişinău. Her husband, Alexandru Viniţchi, continued to protest outside the Russian Embassy; he said that he will stay there until he enters a coma.

The parents decided to end hunger strike after his mother met with Ilie Cazac and talked for more than an hour and after the agreement from the separatist authorities to allow him to have his own defending lawyer. Stela Surchicean was accompanied by an OSCE representative who was not allowed to participate at the meeting. But the two parents cannot go back home in Bender because they feel in danger: "We were threatened in front of the OSCE representatives that if we go home we might end up in jail. Even if we have two houses in the Transnistrean region, we are now homeless."

In December 2010, the Deputy Prime Minister for Reintegration Victor Osipov has called on the foreign partners involved in the Transnistria conflict settlement process to enhance efforts so as to release Ilie Cazac and Ernest Vardanean. Official letters to this effect were sent to the diplomats representing Russia, Ukraine, the United States, the European Union and the OSCE, Kazakhstan (which chairs the OSCE in 2010). A similar message was sent to the special representative of the Council of Europe, as this organization plays an important role in the protection of human rights in Europe.

On February 9, 2011, as a result of a hidden trial, being deprived of elementary rights such as legal assistance and meetings with his relatives, Cazac was sentenced by the Supreme Court of the Transnistrian region to 14 years in prison. Ilie Cazac was subsequently transferred to the Tiraspol Penitentiary no.2, where he was detained in poor health. According to the World Organization Against Torture,

On 22 April 2011, although Mr. Ilie Cazac was allowed to receive from his mother some food and medicines as well as to have a daily phone call with his family, he was also forced to provide a written explanation to the prison administration on how his case became known at the international level. Furthermore, two criminal detainees, who had been previously detained along with Mr. Ilie Cazac in Penitentiary no. 1/ Glinaia in summer 2010, and who had allegedly beaten and threatened him with death and rape, were reportedly transferred to Tiraspol Penitentiary no.2 without any particular reason. [...] OMCT was informed that Mr. Ilie Cazac’s family was repeatedly harassed, intimidated and threatened since his arrest by representatives of the de facto Transnistrian authorities, with the result that his family was forced to leave its home in Tighina.

On July 17, 2011, the World Organization Against Torture issued a statement, expressing its concern about the physical and mental state of Ilie Cazac. His pardon request was rejected in August 2011.

Ilie Cazac was released from prison in the evening of October 31, 2011. On November 2, 2011, Prime Minister Vlad Filat held a meeting with Ilie Cazac. On November 2, 2011, at the meeting with Cazacu, Navanethem Pillay said that the United Nations strongly backs the people detained in the Transnistrian region, noting that the United Nations had also advocated the release of Ilie Cazac. The UN High Commissioner for Human Rights noted that initially, the meeting was scheduled at the Tiraspol-based prison.

== See also ==
- Human rights in Transnistria
