= Operation Long Jump =

Alleged 1943 Nazi plan to kill Allied leaders

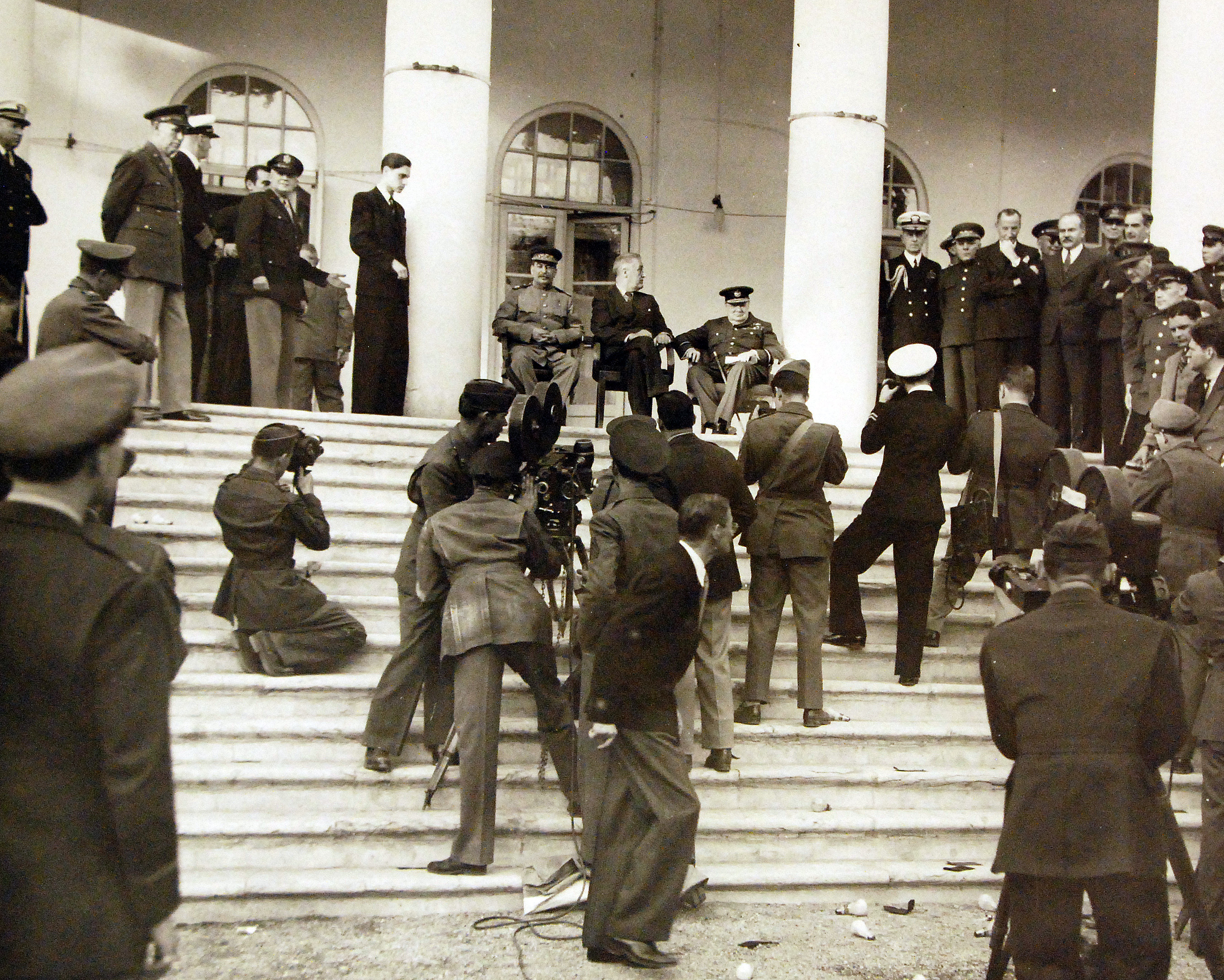
Tehran Conference

Operation Long Jump (German: Unternehmen Weitsprung) was an alleged German plan to simultaneously assassinate Soviet leader Joseph Stalin, United Kingdom prime minister Winston Churchill, and United States president Franklin D. Roosevelt—the "Big Three" Allied leaders—at the 1943 Tehran Conference during World War II. The operation in Iran was to be led by SS-Obersturmbannführer Otto Skorzeny of the Waffen SS. A group of agents from the Soviet Union, led by Soviet spy Gevork Vartanian, uncovered the plot before its inception and the mission was never launched. The assassination plan and its disruption have been popularized by the Russian media with appearances in films and novels.

== Planning ==
According to Soviet sources, German military intelligence discovered, after breaking a U.S. Navy code, that a major conference would be held at Tehran in mid-October 1943. Based on this information, Adolf Hitler was presented with, and approved, a plan to assassinate the three top Allied leaders. Operational control was passed to Ernst Kaltenbrunner, chief of the Reich Security Main Office, who chose Skorzeny to head the mission. The German agent Elyesa Bazna (codenamed "Cicero"), in Ankara, Turkey, was also brought into the operation.

== Counter-intelligence ==
The NKVD alleged that, despite German secrecy, it quickly uncovered the plot following a tip-off from Soviet agent Nikolai Kuznetsov, who was posing as Paul Siebert, an Oberleutnant in the Wehrmacht from Nazi-occupied Ukraine. He got the information from an SS-Sturmbannführer named von Ortel, who was known to become "talkative" when drinking. However, other sources state that Hans Ulrich von Ortel never existed, and was a fictional person set up by Russians.

The Soviets got more information from 19-year-old Soviet spy Gevork Vartanian, whose team of seven intelligence officers in 1940–41 had identified more than 400 Nazi agents, all of whom had been arrested by Soviet troops. In 1943, in their efforts to foil the assassination plot devised by the Nazis, Vartanian's group located an advance party of six German radio operators who had dropped by parachute near Qum, 60 km (37 mi) from Tehran. The Soviet agents tailed the German spies to the Iranian capital, where an existing Abwehr network set them up in a villa. From this location, the German observers radioed intelligence reports back to Berlin. However, unknown to them, all their transmissions were being intercepted, recorded, and decoded by NKVD operatives. The decrypts revealed that a second group of operatives, led by Skorzeny, would be dropped into Iran for the actual assassination attempt in mid-October. The NKVD claimed that this supported existing intelligence about the involvement of the SS commander because Vartanian's group had already tailed Skorzeny during his own reconnaissance mission to Tehran.

Vartanian later told the following details,

We followed them to Tehran, where the Nazi field station had readied a villa for their stay. They were travelling by camel, and were loaded with weapons. While we were watching the group, we established that they had contacted Berlin by radio, and recorded their communication...When we decrypted these radio messages, we learnt that the Germans were preparing to land a second group of subversives for a terrorist act—the assassination or abduction of the 'Big Three'. The second group was supposed to be led by Skorzeny himself.

All the members of the first group were arrested and forced to contact their handlers under Soviet supervision. The operation got off track and the main group led by Skorzeny never went to Tehran.

According to Vartanian,

We arrested all the members of the first group and forced them to make contact with enemy intelligence under our supervision. It was tempting to seize Skorzeny himself, but the Big Three had already arrived in Tehran and we could not afford the risk. We deliberately gave a radio operator an opportunity to report the failure of the mission, and the Germans decided against sending the main group under Skorzeny to Tehran. In this way, the success of our group in locating the Nazi advance party and our subsequent actions thwarted an attempt to assassinate the Big Three.

== Cancellation ==
According to the NKVD, with October approaching the mission was aborted; Berlin is said to have received a secret code from Tehran indicating that its agents had been discovered and they were under surveillance.

In 1984, Vartanian was recognised for his role in uncovering Operation Long Jump. He was awarded the Gold Star medal of the Hero of the Soviet Union for his service in World War II and the Cold War. In 2007 he met with Winston Churchill's granddaughter and was congratulated for his great service to the Allies. In 2003, relying on declassified documents, Yuri Lvovich Kuznets published a book called Tehran-43 or Operation Long Jump, which detailed Vartanian's role at the Tehran Conference. A Soviet film, Tegeran-43, which featured Alain Delon, was released in 1981.

== Western skepticism ==
When Stalin informed Churchill and Roosevelt about the plan, some members within the American and British delegations doubted the existence of a plot because all evidence of its existence was provided by Soviet intelligence. In Britain, the Joint Intelligence Committee of the War Cabinet, considering the matter afterwards in London, concluded that the so-called Nazi plot against the Big Three was "complete baloney". Ambassador Reader Bullard suspected that the plot was conceived by Molotov to win over Roosevelt's favor and convince him to stay at a house on the Soviet Embassy grounds to surveil him, instead of the insecure American Legation or the under construction British Embassy (making it difficult for Roosevelt's wheelchair). When British Security officers pressed the NKVD for details, Bullard described their reaction as "a look of helplessness mixed with an appeal for sympathy, as though to say: 'You know what it is: if Molotov says there's a plot, there is a plot.'" When W. Averell Harriman, who also doubted the veracity of the Soviet claims, asked Molotov after the conference whether the Nazis or Molotov himself had conjured it up, he replied that he had no details of an actual plot, yet he knew that there were Nazi agents in Tehran.

There have been debates about the veracity of the story. Skeptics brought up a number of arguments in that regard. Firstly, the German espionage network in Iran had been destroyed in mid-1943, well before Tehran was chosen as a meeting place. Secondly, more than 3,000 NKVD security troops guarded the city for the duration of the conference without incident. Thirdly, both Roosevelt and Churchill travelled on foot or open jeep throughout their four-day stay in Tehran.

Otto Skorzeny denied the story after the war. In his memoirs, he recalled a meeting with Hitler and SS-Brigadeführer Walter Schellenberg, from the foreign intelligence branch of the Sicherheitsdienst, when they did discuss the feasibility of assassinating Churchill. However, Skorzeny said he told the Fuhrer the idea was unworkable and that Hitler agreed with his assessment. Skorzeny wrote, "Long Jump has really only existed in the imagination of a bunch of less than truth-loving hacks [...]". He also castigated Soviet sources for continually referring to Sturmbannführer Paul von Oertel, who Skorzeny said never existed.

== Historiography ==
In Russia, the story remains a subject of great interest. In 2003, the Russian writer Yuri Kuznets held a press conference in the Foreign Intelligence Service in Moscow to promote his book Tehran-43. In 2007, a Russian television company promoted a documentary with the working title The Lion and the Bear. It documented Long Jump and was to be presented by Churchill's granddaughter Celia Sandys.

British historian John Erickson devotes four pages to the plot in the second volume of his history of the Eastern Front. The major players were Ilya Svetlov and Nikolai Kuznetsov. Svedlov, who was trained by the OGPU, was to take the place of Frederick Schultz and would move to Munich to join his brother Hans. The real Frederick would move to distant Novosibirsk with his fiancee. Then Erikson states that in Hamburg Frederick never arrived from Russia, and Ilya was given the name of Walter Schultz a younger member of the Hamburg family whose suicide had been hushed up. He studied at the University of Berlin and joined the storm troopers and the Nazi Party. He was sent to Tehran to arrange sabotage. His wife and a German SS officer Ressler became suspicious of him. So the crash of a German Ju-52 transport aircraft was arranged, perhaps by Soviet agents Vasili Pankow, and his wife died in a car crash. The first plan was to kill Stalin and Churchill and carry off Roosevelt. Otto Skorzeny abandoned the first variant after a brief study. There was no second variant but Stalin and Molotov got what they wanted – Roosevelt stayed into the Soviet compound.

In his memoirs, Pavel Sudoplatov brought up the details of how Kuznetsov recruited German officer Oster. According to Sudoplatov, the training of German saboteurs was taking place in the foothills of the Carpathian Mountains, where the group led by the intelligence officer Kuznetsov, who was disguised as a Wehrmacht lieutenant, was working. Oster, who owed Kunetsov some money, offered to pay back the debt with Persian carpets after his trip to Tehran, which suggested that the plot about the assassination attempt during the Tehran conference was quite feasible.

French journalist Laslo Havas wrote a book about Operation Long Jump after the war and claimed that Soviet intelligence had disrupted the German plot.

In his 28 November 1943 diary entry, Alexander Cadogan, a British diplomat, wrote simply, "Russians now claim to have unearthed a plot, and think it safer for President to move into a house in their compound. This he has now done."

British military historian Nigel West wrote about the plot in the book Historical Dictionary of World War II Intelligence. He stated that following the arrest in August 1943 of Franz Meyer, a German resident in Iran, only remnants of a German spy network remained. Between 22 and 27 November, six groups of parachutists under the command of a Rudolf von Holten-Pflug were dropped near Qom and another eight groups, 60 people in all, under the command of a Vladimir Shkvarev, were dropped near Kazvin. The NKVD quickly arrested the teams led by Shkvarev. Further units were led by SD agents Lothar Schollhorn and Winifred Oberg, but they did not suspect the Soviets knew about them because of Meyer. Stalin offered to let Roosevelt and Churchill stay in the Soviet embassy during the conference. However, Roosevelt insisted on staying at the US embassy on the other side of the city, but the planned ambush of the Big Three was disrupted because the British arrested Holten-Pflug and his group on the night of 31 November ^{[this date is incorrect; there is no Nov. 31]}. On 2 December, six more German agents, who had been betrayed by double agent Ernst Merser, were arrested.

In his detailed monograph Espionage and Counterintelligence in Occupied Persia (Iran), Anglo-Canadian intelligence historian Adrian O'Sullivan has thoroughly reviewed the primary sources and secondary literature on Operation Long Jump and has placed the alleged plot squarely in the context of Allied security operations around the time of the Tehran Conference. O'Sullivan claims to have debunked the perpetuation of the myth in recent years by the KGB and the Putin-era intelligence services.

The novel Stormtroop Edelweiss - Valley of the Assassins, by Charles Whiting (writing as Leo Kessler), presents a heavily fictionalized version of Operation Long Jump, substituting a unit of elite German mountain troops for Skorzeny and his party.

Several English-language publications have addressed the plot. Book-length publications include Operation Long Jump (2015) by Bill Yenne and Night of the Assassins (2020) by journalist Howard Blum.

Stanley Lovell, Director of Research for the OSS, devoted an entire chapter of his 1963 memoir Of Spies and Stratagems to a very similar story. According to Lovell: OSS agent "C-12" was sent undercover into Iran. When a German commando team parachuted into the area, "C-12" got himself hired as their guide and translator. He escorted them to Tehran, where they planted explosives under a street used by Churchill and Roosevelt. Then he turned them in. Lovell admitted he had no official knowledge of this.

== See also ==
- Teheran 43, a Soviet-French drama film from 1981 about an assassination attempt on Churchill, Stalin and Roosevelt during the Tehran Conference
