= Vardan =

Vardan (Armenian: Վարդան; Vartan or Wartan in Western Armenian transliteration, pronounced [vɑɾˈtʰɑn] in both Eastern and Western Armenian), Varden (Georgian: ვარდენ) in Georgian, is an Armenian name of Middle Persian origin (from Mid. Pers. Wardā), popular in Armenia and Georgia.

== Saint Vardan ==
- Saint Vardan (Saint Vartan in Western Armenian), an Armenian saint

== Given name ==
- Vardan Adjemyan, Armenian composer of orchestral, operatic and chamber works
- Vardan Aigektsi (died 1250), Armenian author
- Vardan Ajemian (1905–1977), Soviet Armenian theatral director and actor, People's Artist of USSR (1965)
- Vardan Areveltsi (1198–1271), Armenian historian, geographer, philosopher and translator
- Vardan Ayvazyan, the former Ecology Minister of Armenia
- Vardan Bostanjyan (born 1949), Armenian politician
- Vardan Ghazaryan (born 1969), Lebanese-Armenian footballer
- Vardan Khachatryan (born 1968), former Armenian football defender
- Vardan Kushnir (1969–2005), spammer of Armenian descent
- Vardan Mamikonian (musician), Armenian pianist, and a naturalised French citizen
- Vardan Mazalov (born 1983), Uzbek SSR born Armenian football striker
- Vardan Militosyan (born 1950), Armenian weightlifter
- Vardan Minasyan (born 1974), Armenian football manager and former player
- Vardan Oskanyan (born 1955), Minister of Foreign Affairs of Armenia during 1998–2008
- Vardan Voskanyan (born 1972), Armenian judoka

== See also ==
- Vartan, another romanization of the name (used mostly in Western Armenian)
- Wartan in Western Armenian
