= Ara Vartanian =

Brazilian-Armenian jeweller (born 1975)

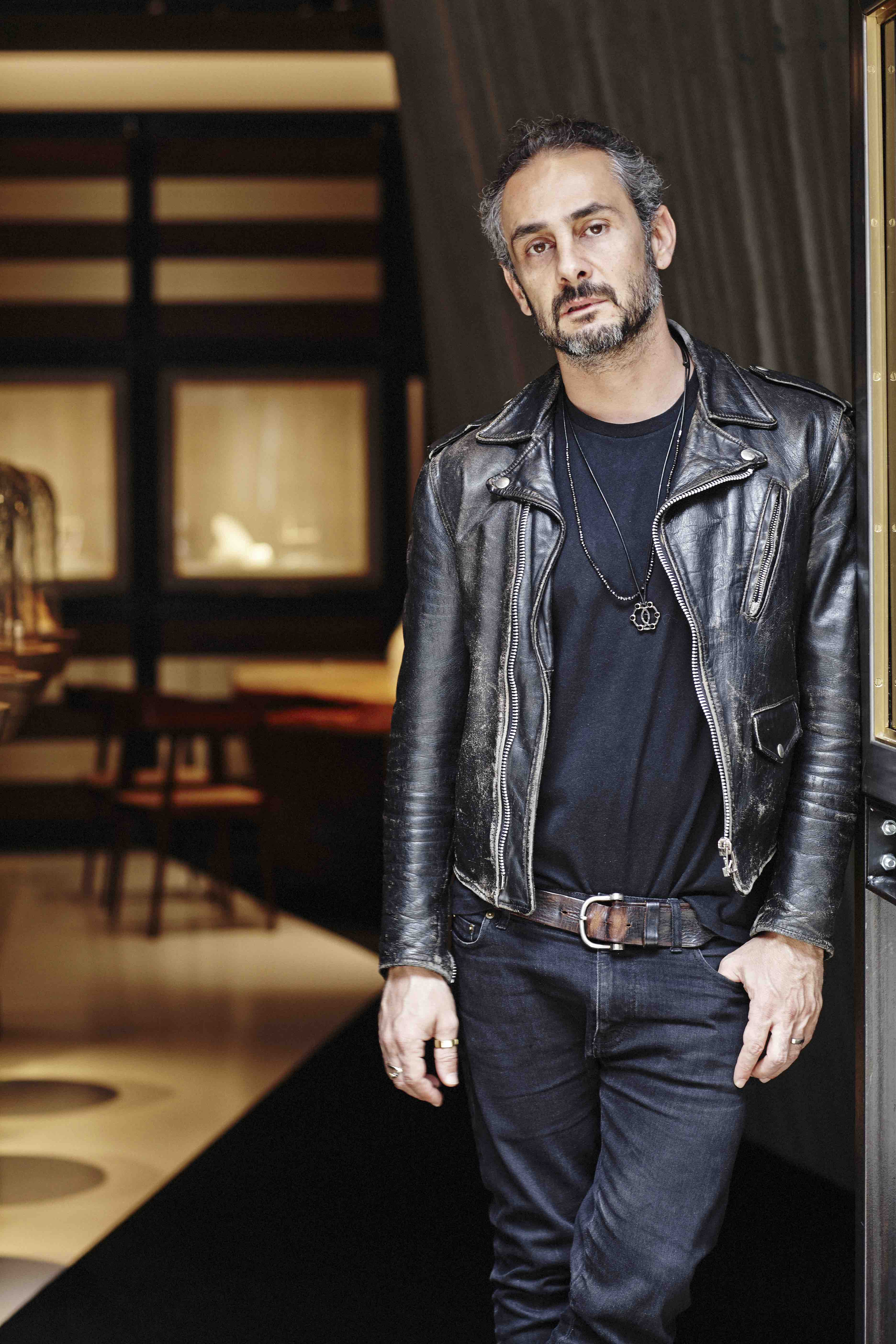
- Born: 1975 (age 50–51)
- Education: Boston University
- Occupation: Jeweller
- Years active: 2000–present
- Spouse: Sabrina Gasperin

Ara Vartanian (born 1975) is a Brazilian-Armenian jeweller and best known as the founder of his eponymous jewellery house.

== Early life and education ==
Vartanian was born into a family of jewellers in Beirut, Lebanon, and spent his early life in São Paulo, Brazil surrounded by precious stones. Vartanian gained a degree in Economics from Boston University before locating to New York City in 1998 to work as a trader on the NASDAQ. In 2000, Vartanian left the financial market to return to Brazil and dedicate himself to designing jewellery.

== Career ==
In 2000, Vartanian founded his eponymous jewellery house and has since developed the use of innovative jewellery settings including; two and three-finger rings, ‘Octopus’ rings, signature ‘Hook’ earrings and his distinctive use of inverted diamonds. Vartanian uses the gemstone as the main source of inspiration for his designs, creating the structure around the stone.

In 2002, Vartanian began to sell his pieces internationally in New York and opened his São Paulo showroom in 2005. This was followed by store openings in Sao Paulo (2010) and Rio de Janeiro (2012). This was followed by a collaboration with Unbreakable Hope campaign of GRAACC in 2014 to raise money for children with cancer.

Vartanian opened his first flagship outside of Brazil in Mayfair, London on Bruton Place in 2016 in a section of Baron Saatchi’s former home. Vartanian’s creations have been worn by celebrities including Naomi Campbell, Penélope Cruz and Madonna.

=== Collaborations ===
Vartanian has worked on various collaborations with different artists including; the Brazilian artist Ernesto Neto (2002), Brazilian decorative lighting brand Scatto (2009), German artist Janaina Tschäpe (2013) and with Brazilian furniture designer Hugo França (2016). Vartanian often designs with his wife in mind, former model Sabrina Gasperin, who he sees as a muse for the brand. Gasperin in turn, designs with Vartanian for her Sabrina by Ara Vartanian line, which includes the 2011 collection Mothers and Daughters.

In 2017 he launched a new collection in collaboration with British supermodel Kate Moss named Kate Moss X Ara Vartanian.

In 2025, Vartanian designed the SP Open trophy, which is a professional woman's tennis tournament contested in São Paulo, Brazil. This trophy is awarded to the singles and doubles champions of the SP Open and is inspired by the “Marco Zero”, the geographical and symbolic heart of the city of São Paulo. To build the trophy, it took 4 months of work from a team of 7 people. The trophy weights 10KG and its dimensions are 53 cm x 53 cm x 25 cm.
