= Vardan Mamikonian =

Armenian general and saint

Sparapet Vardan Mamikonian Վարդան Մամիկոնյան
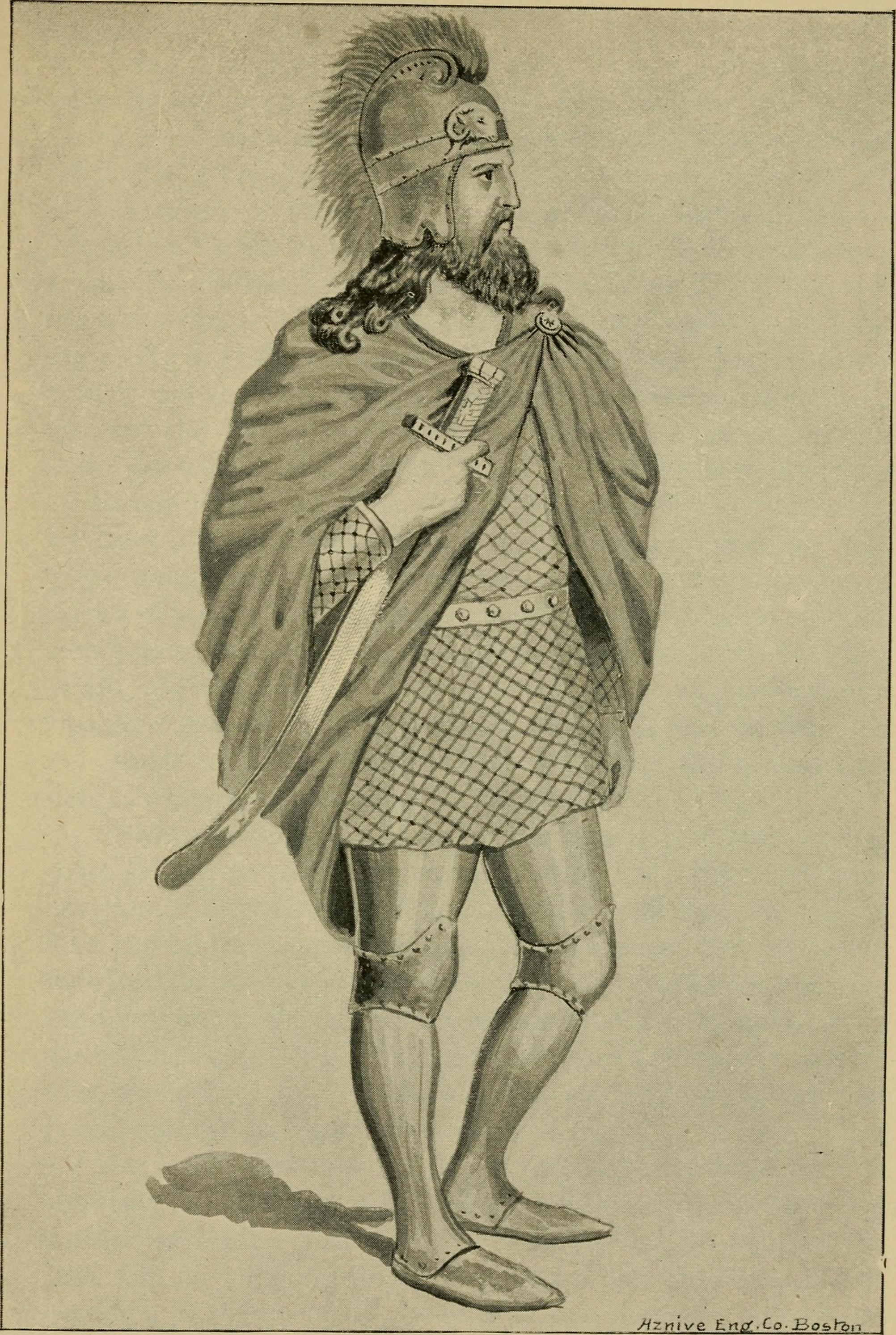
- Illustration of Vardan Mamikonian in the 1908 book Illustrated Armenia and Armenians
- Born: c. 387; Ashtishat, Kingdom of Armenia
- Died: 451 (aged 63–64); Avarayr Plain, Sasanian Empire
- Military career
- Rank: Sparapet
- Conflicts: Battle of Avarayr †

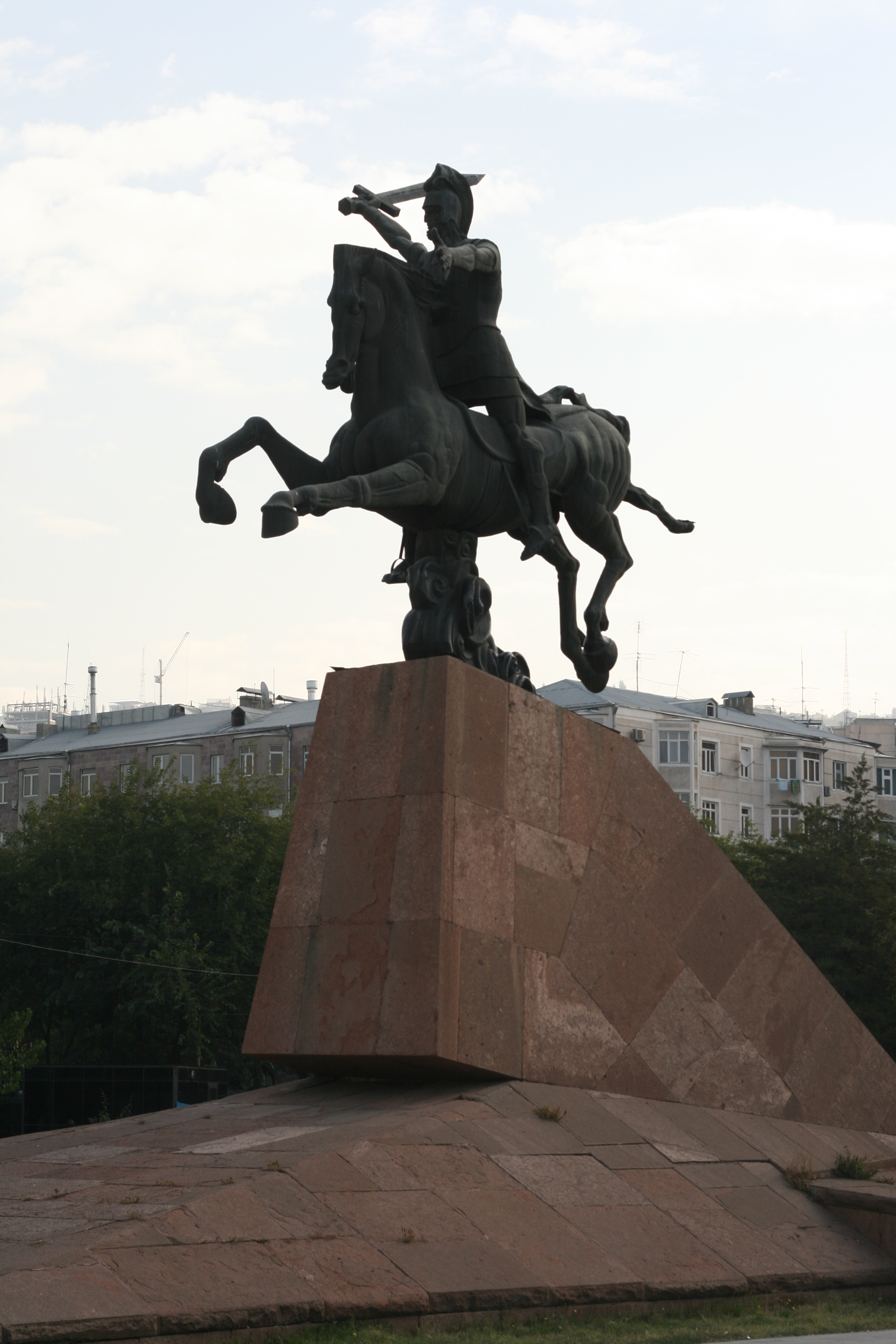
The statue of Vardan Mamikonian in Yerevan.

Vardan Mamikonian (Armenian: Վարդան Մամիկոնեան; variants: Vartan, Wartan; c. 387 – 451) was an Armenian military leader who led a rebellion against Sasanian Iran in 450–451. He was the head of the Mamikonian noble family and holder of the hereditary title of sparapet, the supreme commander of the Armenian armed forces. Vardan and most of his comrades died at the Battle of Avarayr in 451, but their sacrifice was immortalized in the works of the Armenian historians Elishe and Ghazar Parpetsi. He is regarded as a national hero among Armenians and venerated as a martyr and a saint of the Armenian Apostolic Church and the Armenian Catholic Church. Vardan and the rebellion he led are commemorated in numerous works of art and literature. According to Arshag Chobanian, "To the Armenian nation, Vartan [...] is the most beloved figure, the most sacred in their history, the symbolical hero who typifies the national spirit."

== Etymology and name variants ==
The name Vardan (Armenian: Վարդան) is of Middle Persian origin, derived from ward, meaning "rose". While Vardan is the standard spelling in the Republic of Armenia, the name is traditionally rendered as Vartan or Wartan by Armenians from West Armenia and the resulting diaspora across the Middle East, Europe, and the Americas. These variants refer to the same historical figure and reflect the distinct pronunciation and transliteration systems used by Armenians outside of the modern Republic.

== Biography ==
Vardan Mamikonian was born in approximately 387 in the settlement of Ashtishat in the Taron region to Hamazasp Mamikonian and Sahakanoysh, daughter of Patriarch Sahak of Armenia. He had two younger brothers, Hamazasp and Hmayeak. He was educated in Vagharshapat at the school founded by Patriarch Sahak and Mesrop Mashtots. After the death of his father, he became the head of the Mamikonian noble family. In 420, he went to Constantinople with Mesrop Mashtots and was appointed stratelates (general) of Byzantine Armenia by Theodosius II. In 422, he returned to Vagharshapat, then went to Ctesiphon, where Sasanian king Bahram V recognized him as sparapet of the Kingdom of Armenia; the office of sparapet, the supreme commander of the Armenian armed forces, was held hereditarily by the Mamikonian family. Vardan retained this title after the abolition of the Kingdom of Armenia in 428.

Conditions worsened in Sasanian Armenia with the accession of Yazdegerd II in 439. At first, Yazdegerd and his officials imposed heavier taxes and obligations on Armenia and its nobility, but did not yet openly move against the Armenian Church. In 442, Yazdegerd sent the Armenian cavalry commanded by Vardan east to fight the Huns. In 449, the Sasanian king issued an edict officially imposing Zoroastrianism on Armenia. That same year, the Armenian elite gathered at Artaxata under the presidency of marzpan Vasak Siwni, Vardan, the bidaxsh of the Iberian March, and the acting Catholicos of Armenia to declare their loyalty to the Sasanian state and their Christian faith. Yazdegerd did not accept this decision and summoned the Armenian magnates (nakharars) to Ctesiphon and forced them to convert to Zoroastrianism. Yazdegerd released most of the nobles after an unexpected attack from the east and sent magi to convert Armenia.

Upon their return to Armenia, Vardan and most of the Armenian nobles repudiated their conversion, although Yeghishe and Ghazar Parpetsi give conflicting accounts of Vardan's initial apostasy and the origins of the Armenian rebellion that broke out in 450. Vardan may have initially intended to retire into exile, but soon emerged as the leader the popular rebellion against the imposition of Zoroastrianism. Vardan and his allies made a solemn oath and captured a number of fortresses and settlements. Vardan's forces won a major victory over the Persians in the summer of 450 and secured an alliance with the northern Huns; however, an embassy to Byzantium asking for aid was unsuccessful. Vardan was opposed by a significant pro-Persian party of Armenian nobles, and marzpan Vasak Siwni refused to follow him out of Armenia to meet the Persians in battle.

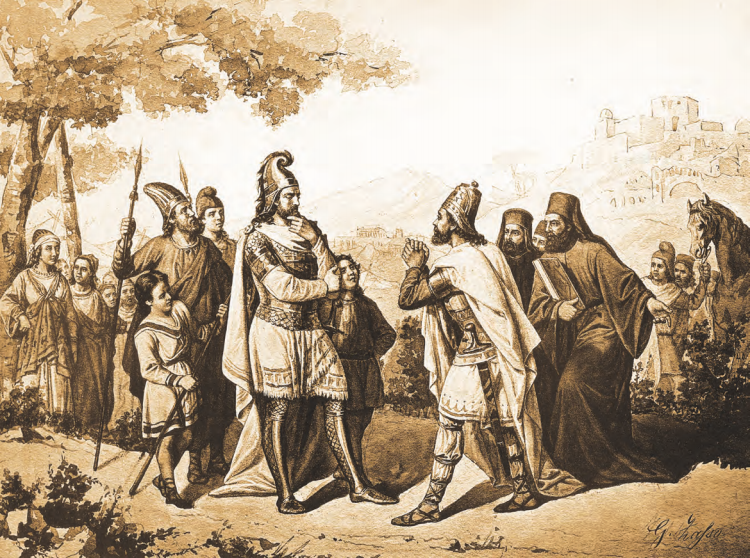
Arshavir Kamsarakan appeals to Vardan Mamikonyan to return to the Armenian lands, Julian Zasso (1833-1889)

In the summer of 451, a large Sasanian army including the elite cavalry corps of the Immortals and war elephants marched against the Armenian rebels. Vardan's army battled with the Persians at Avarayr near Maku on June 2. The supporters of Vasak Siwni deserted during the battle and Vardan's forces were defeated, with Vardan and most of the Armenian nobility dying in the fighting. The aftermath of the Battle of Avarayr is not completely clear, but it appears that Yazdegerd, alarmed by the Persian losses, withdrew his troops and imprisoned Vasak Siwni. Vardan's surviving supporters were imprisoned in Iran, although many of them were eventually released in the following years. In 481, a new rebellion manifested under the leadership of Vardan's nephew, Vahan Mamikonian, which succeeded in securing recognition of Armenian religious rights and autonomy with the Treaty of Nvarsak in 484.

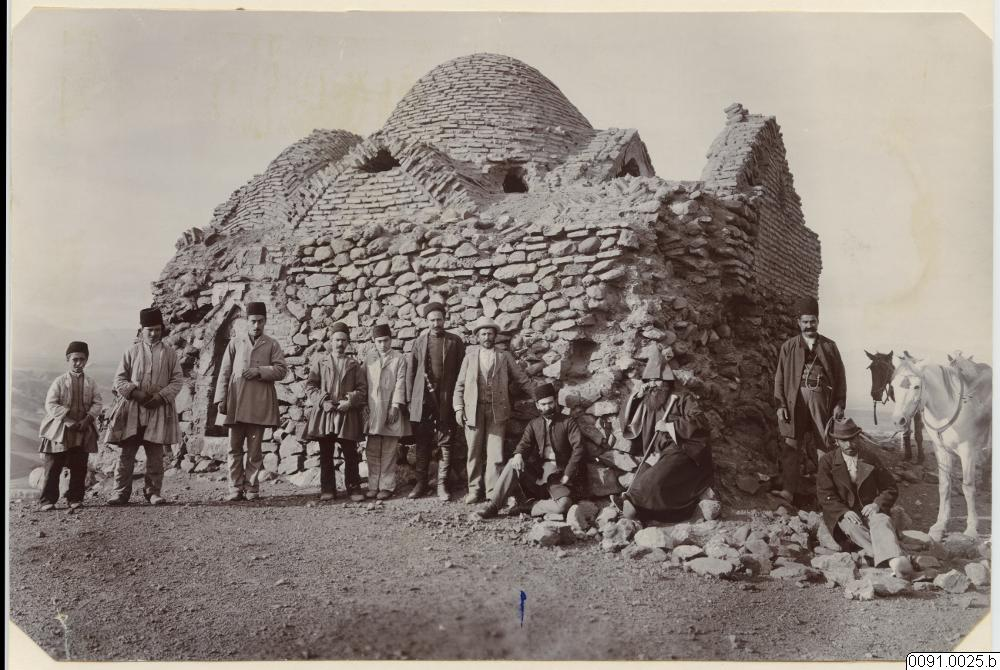
Vardan Mamikonian Tomb near Diza, Her (Khoy)

== Family ==
Vardan Mamikonian was the father of Vardeni Mamikonian, known as Shushanik, born around 439 AD. Shushanik married Varsken, a prominent Mihranid feudal lord (pitiakhsh). When Varsken took a pro-Persian position renouncing Christianity and adopting Zoroastrianism, he tried to force his wife Shushanik to convert as well, but she refused vehemently to submit and abandon her Christian faith, so she was put to death in AD 475 on her husband's orders. Shushanik has been canonized by the Eastern Orthodox Church and is venerated by the Armenian Apostolic Church. Known as Saint Shushanik, her feast day is celebrated on October 17.

== Legacy ==
=== Veneration ===
Saint Vardan

Martyr
- Venerated in: Armenian Apostolic Church; Armenian Catholic Church
- Feast: Final Thursday before Great Lent (Armenian Apostolic Church), (Armenian Catholic Church)
- Patronage: Armenia

Vardan Mamikonian is as a saint of the Armenian Apostolic Church. He is also revered by the Armenian Catholic Church and Armenian Evangelical Church.

His commemoration day in the official Armenian Church calendar is usually in the month of February and on very rare occasions may fall in the first week of March. The actual feast day of Saint Vardan is a moveable feast, as it is on the last Thursday before Great Lent. Armenian churches named after him include the St. Vartan Cathedral of the Armenian Apostolic Church in New York City and the St. Vartan Armenian Catholic Church in Bloomfield Hills, Michigan. There is also a St. Vartan Park near the cathedral. A segment of the Berlin Turnpike in Wethersfield, Connecticut is signed as the "Vartan Mamigonian Memorial Highway."

=== Knights of Vartan Inc. (USA) ===
The Armenian-American fraternal organization Knights of Vartan is named in honor of Vardan Mamikonian.

== Bibliography ==
- Armot, Robert; Aghajanian, Alfred (2007). Armenian Literature: Comprising Poetry, Drama, Folklore, and Classic Traditions. Los Angeles: Indo-European Publishing. ISBN 9781604440003.
- Avdoyan, Levon (2018). "Vardan Mamikonean". In Nicholson, Oliver (ed.). The Oxford Dictionary of Late Antiquity. Oxford: Oxford University Press. p. 1551. ISBN 978-0-19-866277-8.
- Bedrosian, Robert (1983). "The Sparapetut'iwn in Armenia in the Fourth and Fifth Centuries" (PDF). Armenian Review. 36 (2): 6–46.
- Gaidzakian, Ohan (1898). Illustrated Armenia and the Armenians. Boston.
- Garsoïan, Nina (1997). "The Marzpanate (428–652)". In Hovannisian, Richard G. (ed.). The Armenian People from Ancient to Modern Times. Vol. 1. New York: St. Martin's Press. pp. 95–115. ISBN 0-312-10169-4.
- Katvalian, M. (1985). "Vardan Mamikonyan". In Arzumanian, Makich (ed.). Armenian Soviet Encyclopedia (in Armenian). Vol. 11. Yerevan. pp. 314.
- Sarafian, Krikor A. (1951). Vardanantsʻ paterazmě ew Vardan Mamikonean: Vardanantsʻ paterazmi 1500-ameakin aṛitʻov [Battle of Vardanantz and Vardan Mamikonian] (in Armenian and English) (Second ed.). Fresno: Nor Or.
- Suny, Ronald Grigor (1993). Looking Toward Ararat: Armenia in Modern History. Bloomington: Indiana University Press. ISBN 9780253207739.
- Tchobanian, Archag (1914). The People of Armenia: Their Past, Their Culture, Their Future. Translated by Gregory, G. Marcar. Introduction by Viscount Bryce. London: Dent.
