= Outline of Moldova =

Overview of and topical guide to Moldova

The Flag of Moldova

The Coat of arms of Moldova

The location of Moldova

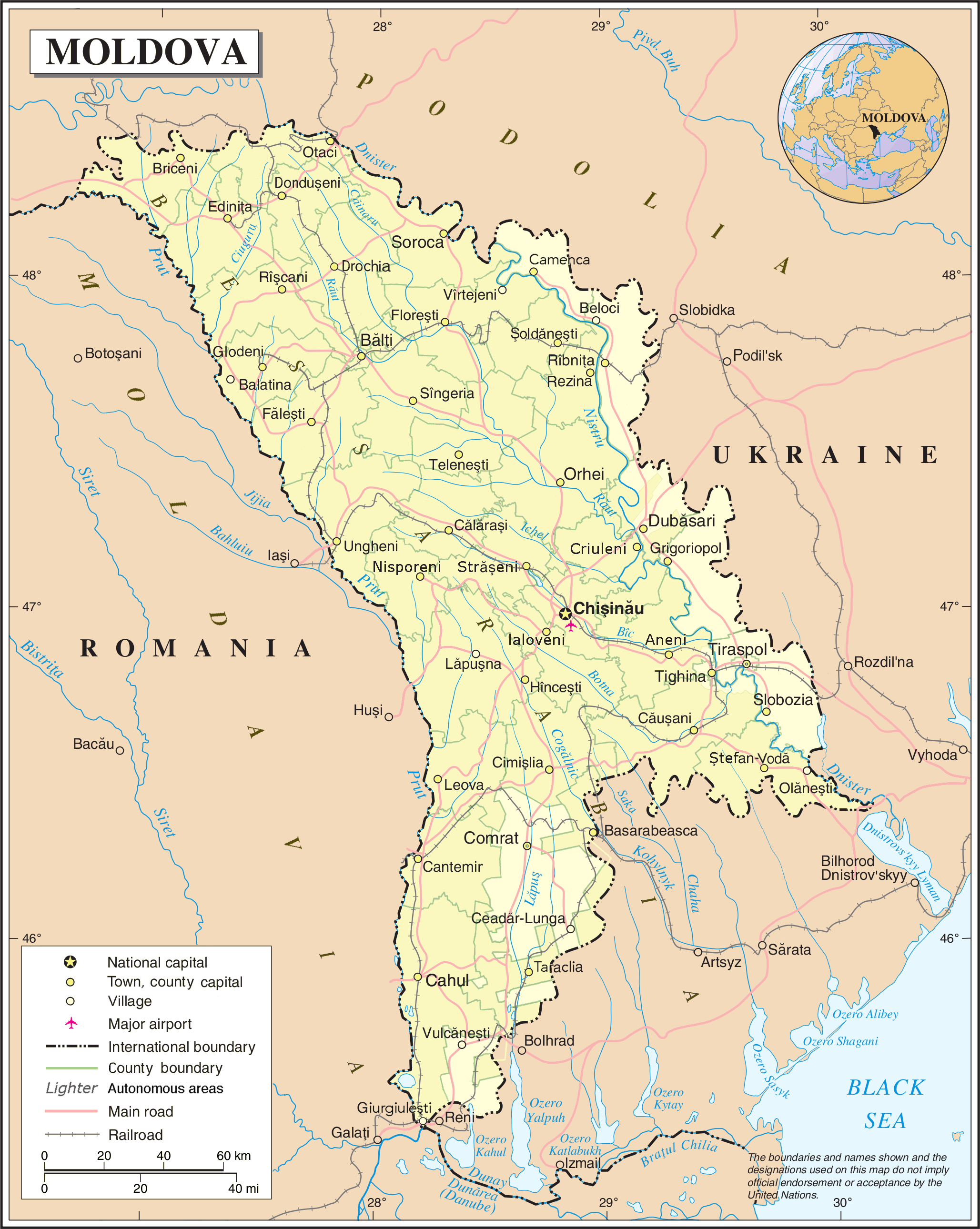
An enlargeable map of the Republic of Moldova

The following outline is provided as an overview of and topical guide to Moldova:

Moldova (officially the Republic of Moldova, Romanian: Republica Moldova) – landlocked country in Eastern Europe, located between Romania to the west and Ukraine to the north, east, and south. The capital city is Chișinău. Moldova declared itself an independent state in 1991 as part of the dissolution of the Soviet Union (see also: Moldovan Declaration of Independence).

Moldova is a parliamentary republic with a president (Romanian: Președinte) as head of state and a prime minister (Romanian: Prim ministru) as head of government. A new constitution was adopted in 1994. A strip of Moldovan territory on the east bank of the river Dniester has been under the de facto control of the breakaway government of Transnistria since 1990. As a result of a decrease in industrial and agricultural output since the dissolution of the Soviet Union (USSR), the relative size of the service sector in Moldova's economy has grown to dominate its GDP and currently stands at over 60%. Moldova remains, however, the poorest country in Europe.

== General reference ==
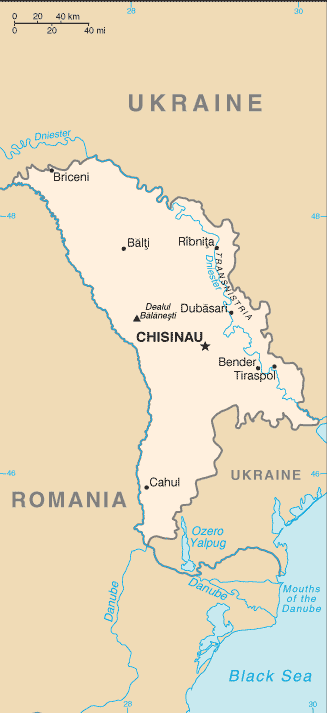
An enlargeable basic map of Moldova

- Pronunciation: /mɒlˈdoʊvə/
- Common English country name: Moldova
- Official English country name: The Republic of Moldova
- Common endonym(s): Moldova
- Official endonym(s): Republica Moldova
- Adjectival(s): Moldovan
- Demonym(s): Moldovans
- Etymology: Name of Moldova
- ISO country codes: MD, MDA, 498
- ISO region codes: See ISO 3166-2:MD
- Internet country code top-level domain: .md

== Geography of Moldova ==
Geography of Moldova

- Moldova is: a landlocked country
- Location:
  - Northern Hemisphere and Eastern Hemisphere
  - Eurasia
    - Europe
      - Eastern Europe
  - Time zone: Eastern European Time (UTC+02), Eastern European Summer Time (UTC+03)
  - Extreme points of Moldova
    - High: Dealul Bălănești 430 m (1,411 ft)
    - Low: Dniester 2 m (6.6 ft)
  - Land boundaries: 1,390 km (860 mi)

Ukraine 940 km (580 mi)
Romania 450 km (280 mi)

- Coastline: none

- Population of Moldova: 2,512,758 (139th Most Populous Country)
- Area of Moldova: 33,846 km^{2} (13,068 sq mi)
- Atlas of Moldova

=== Environment of Moldova ===
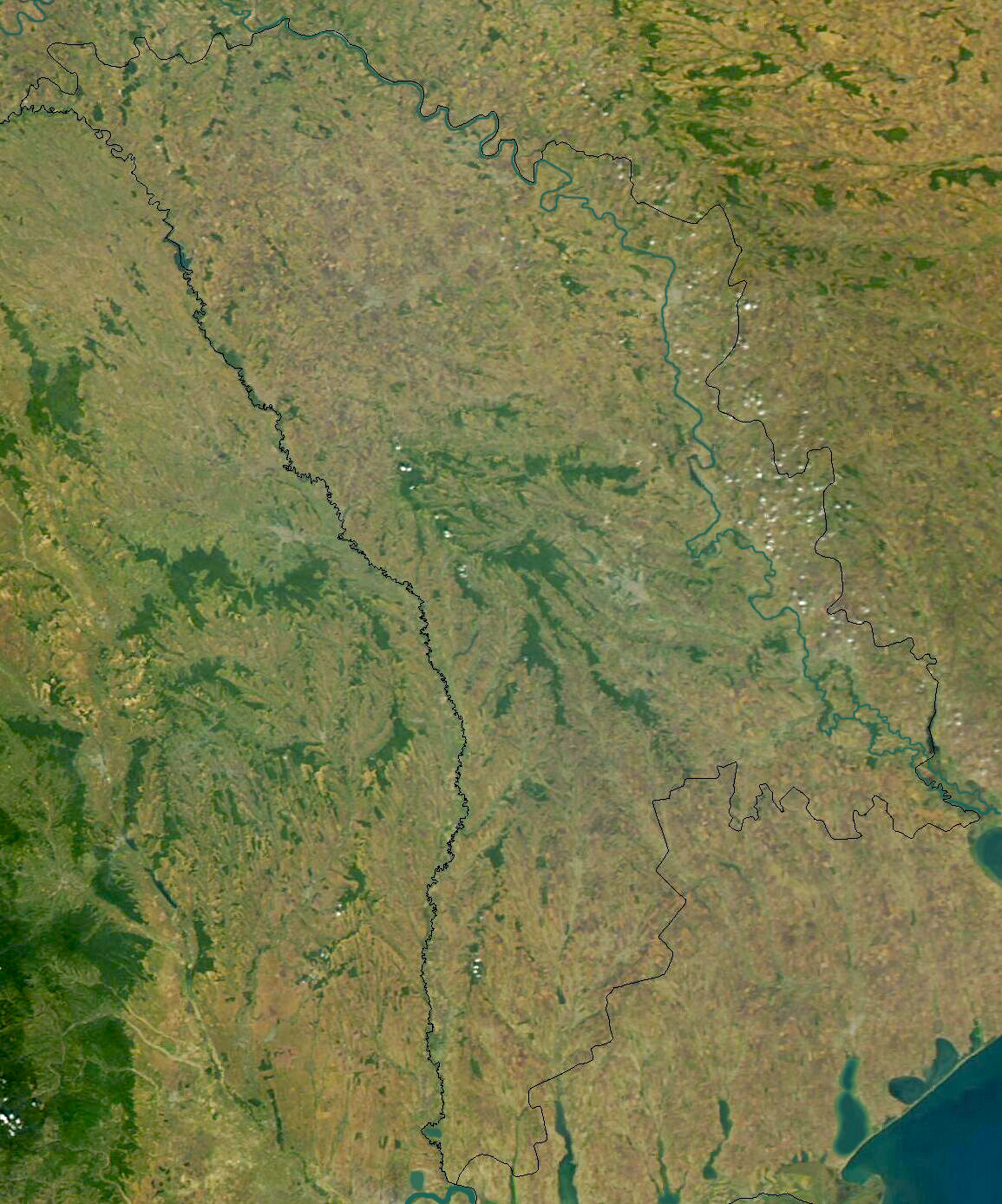
An enlargeable satellite image of Moldova

- Climate of Moldova
- Renewable energy in Moldova
- Geology of Moldova
- Protected areas of Moldova
  - Biosphere reserves in Moldova
  - National parks of Moldova
- Wildlife of Moldova
  - Fauna of Moldova
    - Birds of Moldova
    - Mammals of Moldova

==== Natural geographic features of Moldova ====
- Rivers of Moldova
- World Heritage Sites in Moldova

=== Regions of Moldova ===
==== Administrative divisions of Moldova ====
Administrative divisions of Moldova

- Districts of Moldova

===== Municipalities of Moldova =====
- (political) of Moldova: Chișinău
- Cities of Moldova
- List of towns in Moldova

=== Demography of Moldova ===
Demographics of Moldova

== Government and politics of Moldova ==
Politics of Moldova

- Form of government:
- (political) of Moldova: Chișinău
- Elections in Moldova
- Political parties in Moldova

=== Branches of the government of Moldova ===
Government of Moldova

==== Executive branch of the government of Moldova ====
- Head of state: President of Moldova, Maia Sandu
- Head of government: Prime Minister of Moldova, Alexandru Munteanu
- Cabinet of Moldova

==== Legislative branch of the government of Moldova ====
- Parliament of Moldova (unicameral)

==== Judicial branch of the government of Moldova ====
- Supreme Court of Moldova
- Constitutional Court of Moldova

=== Foreign relations of Moldova ===
Foreign relations of Moldova

- Diplomatic missions in Moldova
- Diplomatic missions of Moldova

==== International organization membership ====
The Republic of Moldova is a member of:

- Black Sea Economic Cooperation Zone (BSEC)
- Central European Initiative (CEI)
- Commonwealth of Independent States (CIS)
- Council of Europe (CE)
- Eurasian Economic Community (EAEC) (observer)
- Euro-Atlantic Partnership Council (EAPC)
- European Bank for Reconstruction and Development (EBRD)
- Food and Agriculture Organization (FAO)
- General Confederation of Trade Unions (GCTU)
- International Atomic Energy Agency (IAEA)
- International Bank for Reconstruction and Development (IBRD)
- International Civil Aviation Organization (ICAO)
- International Criminal Court (ICCt) (signatory)
- International Criminal Police Organization (Interpol)
- International Development Association (IDA)
- International Federation of Red Cross and Red Crescent Societies (IFRCS)
- International Finance Corporation (IFC)
- International Fund for Agricultural Development (IFAD)
- International Labour Organization (ILO)
- International Maritime Organization (IMO)
- International Monetary Fund (IMF)
- International Olympic Committee (IOC)
- International Organization for Migration (IOM)
- International Organization for Standardization (ISO) (correspondent)
- International Telecommunication Union (ITU)
- Inter-Parliamentary Union (IPU)
- Multilateral Investment Guarantee Agency (MIGA)
- Organisation internationale de la Francophonie (OIF)
- Organization for Democracy and Economic Development (GUAM)
- Organization for Security and Cooperation in Europe (OSCE)
- Organisation for the Prohibition of Chemical Weapons (OPCW)
- Partnership for Peace (PFP)
- Southeast European Cooperative Initiative (SECI)
- United Nations (UN)
- United Nations Conference on Trade and Development (UNCTAD)
- United Nations Educational, Scientific, and Cultural Organization (UNESCO)
- United Nations Industrial Development Organization (UNIDO)
- United Nations Mission in Liberia (UNMIL)
- United Nations Mission in the Sudan (UNMIS)
- United Nations Observer Mission in Georgia (UNOMIG)
- United Nations Operation in Cote d'Ivoire (UNOCI)
- Uniunea Latină
- Universal Postal Union (UPU)
- World Customs Organization (WCO)
- World Federation of Trade Unions (WFTU)
- World Health Organization (WHO)
- World Intellectual Property Organization (WIPO)
- World Meteorological Organization (WMO)
- World Tourism Organization (UNWTO)
- World Trade Organization (WTO)

=== Law and order in Moldova ===
Law of Moldova

- Declaration of Independence of Moldova
- Constitution of Moldova
- Crime in Moldova
- Law enforcement in Moldova
- Human rights in Moldova
  - Freedom of religion in Moldova
  - LGBT rights in Moldova

=== Military of Moldova ===
Military of Moldova

- Command
  - Commander-in-chief:
    - Ministry of Defence of Moldova
- Forces
  - Army of Moldova
  - Navy of Moldova: None
  - Air Force of Moldova
  - Special forces of Moldova
- Military history of Moldova
- Military ranks of Moldova

=== Local government in Moldova ===
Local government in Moldova

== History of Moldova ==
History of Moldova

- Bessarabia
- Moldavia
- Counties of Moldova
- History of the Jews in Moldova
- Military history of Moldova
- Prime Ministers of Moldova
- Presidents of Moldova

== Culture of Moldova ==
Culture of Moldova

- Architecture of Moldova
- Cuisine of Moldova
- Festivals in Moldova
- Languages of Moldova
- Media in Moldova
- Museums in Moldova
- National symbols of Moldova
  - Coat of arms of Moldova
  - Flag of Moldova
  - National anthem of Moldova
- People of Moldova
  - Common Moldovan surnames
  - List of Moldovans
  - Moldovan American
- Prostitution in Moldova
- Public holidays in Moldova
- Records of Moldova
- Scouting in Moldova
- World Heritage Sites in Moldova

=== The arts in Moldova ===
Art in Moldova

- Cinema of Moldova
- Dance in Moldova
  - List of Moldovan dances
    - Călușari - a traditional male folk dance
- Literature of Moldova
- Music of Moldova
- Television in Moldova
- Theatre in Moldova
  - National Theatre Bucharest

=== Religion in Moldova ===
Religion in Moldova

- Christianity in Moldova
  - Moldovan Orthodox Church
- Hinduism in Moldova
- Islam in Moldova
- Judaism in Moldova
- Sikhism in Moldova

=== Sports in Moldova ===
Sports in Moldova

- Football in Moldova
- Moldova at the Olympics

== Economy and infrastructure of Moldova ==
Economy of Moldova

- Economic rank, by nominal GDP (2007): 139th (one hundred and thirty ninth)
- Agriculture in Moldova
- Banking in Moldova
  - National Bank of Moldova
- Communications in Moldova
  - Internet in Moldova
  - List of newspapers in Moldova
- Companies of Moldova
  - Supermarkets in Moldova
- Currency of Moldova: Leu
  - ISO 4217: MDL
- Energy in Moldova
  - Energy policy of Moldova
  - Oil industry in Moldova
- Health care in Moldova
- Mining in Moldova
- Moldova Stock Exchange
- Tourism in Moldova
- Transport in Moldova
  - Airports in Moldova
  - Rail transport in Moldova
  - Roads in Moldova
- Water supply and sanitation in Moldova

== Healthcare in Moldova ==
Healthcare in Moldova

== Education in Moldova ==
Education in Moldova

- Museums in Moldova
- Universities in Moldova

== See also ==
Moldova

- Index of Moldova-related articles
- List of international rankings
- List of Moldova-related topics
- Member state of the United Nations
- Outline of Europe
- Outline of geography
