= Outline of Transnistria =

Overview of and topical guide to Transnistria

Flag of Transnistria

Coat of arms of Transnistria

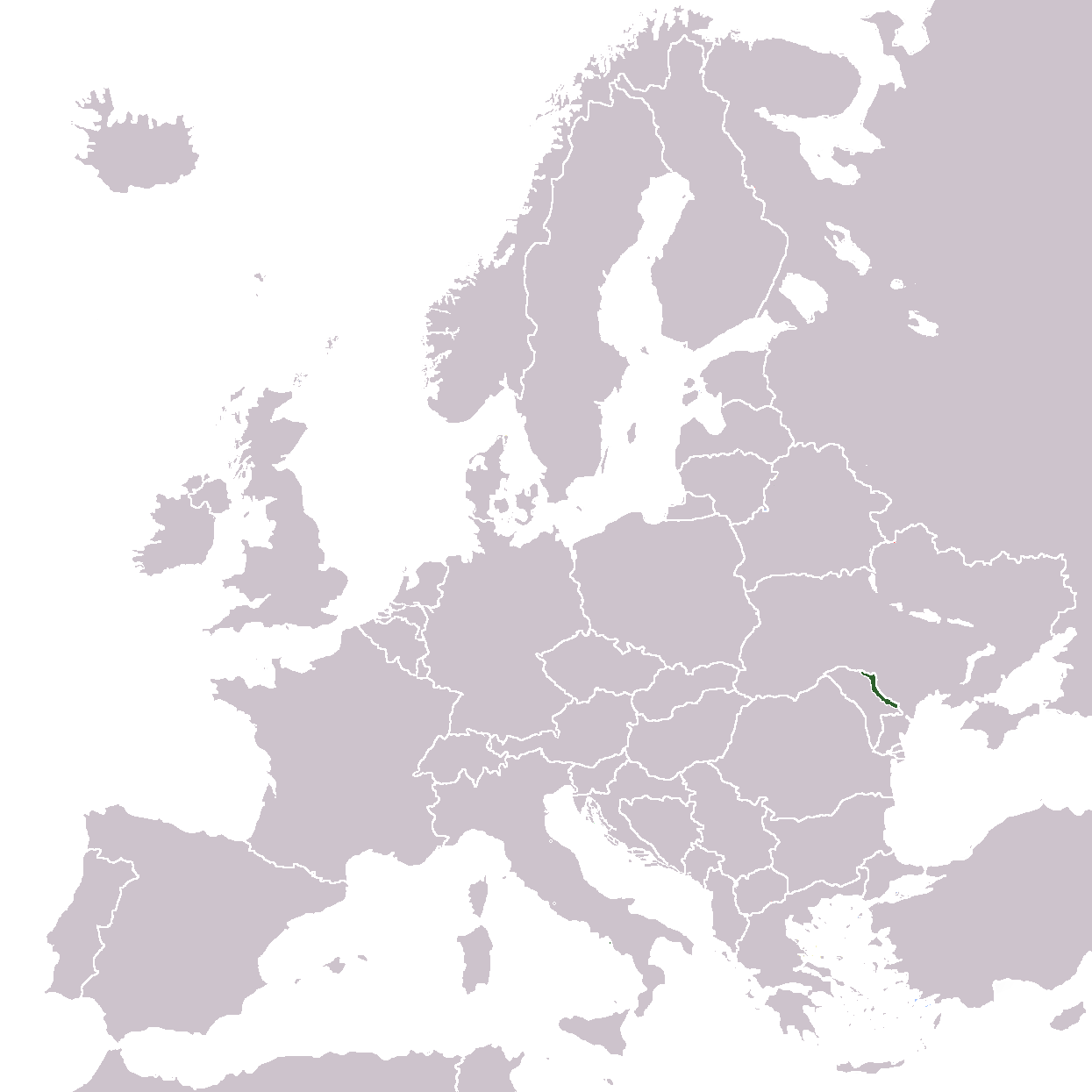
The location of Transnistria

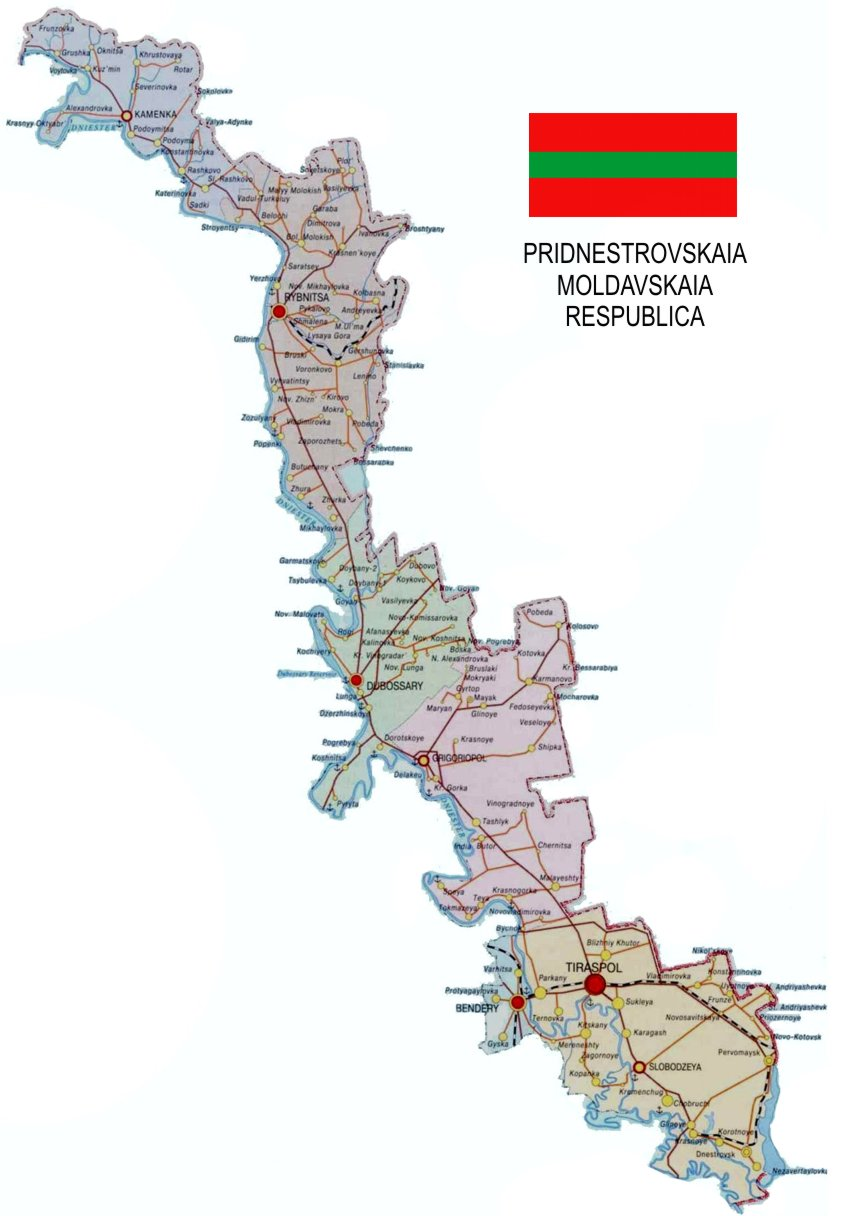
An enlargeable map of Transnistria

The following outline is provided as an overview of and topical guide to Transnistria:

Transnistria is a breakaway state located mostly on a strip of land between the River Dniester and the eastern Moldovan border with Ukraine. Since its declaration of independence in 1990, and especially after the War of Transnistria in 1992, it has been governed as the Pridnestrovian Moldavian Republic (PMR, also known as Pridnestrovie), a state with limited recognition that claims territory to the east of the River Dniester, and also to the city of Bender (Tighina) and its surrounding localities on the west bank in the historical region of Bessarabia. The names "Transnistria" and "Pridnestrovie" both refer to the Dniester River. Unrecognised by any United Nations member state, Transnistria is designated by the Republic of Moldova as the Transnistria autonomous territorial unit with special legal status (Unitatea teritorială autonomă cu statut juridic special Transnistria), or Stînga Nistrului ("Left Bank of the Dniester").

== General reference ==
- Pronunciation:
- Common English country name: Transnistria
- Official English country name: The Pridnestrovian Moldavian Republic
- Common endonym(s): Transnistrian, Pridnestrovian
- Official endonym(s):
- Adjectival(s):
- Demonym(s):
- Etymology: Name of Transnistria
- ISO country codes: See the Outline of Moldova
- ISO region codes: See the Outline of Moldova
- Internet country code top-level domain: See the Outline of Moldova

== Geography of Transnistria ==
Geography of Transnistria

- Transnistria is: a de facto independent though partially recognised sovereign state
- Location:
  - Northern Hemisphere and Eastern Hemisphere
  - Eurasia
    - Europe
      - Eastern Europe
  - Time zone: Eastern European Time (UTC+02), Eastern European Summer Time (UTC+03)
  - Extreme points of Transnistria
- Population of Transnistria:
- Area of Transnistria: 4163 km^{2}
- Atlas of Transnistria

=== Environment of Transnistria ===
- Climate of Transnistria
- World Heritage Sites in Transnistria: None

=== Regions of Transnistria ===
Regions of Transnistria

==== Ecoregions of Transnistria ====
List of ecoregions in Transnistria

- Ecoregions in Transnistria

==== Administrative divisions of Transnistria ====
Administrative divisions of Transnistria

- Raions of Transnistria
  - Municipalities of Transnistria

===== Raions of Transnistria =====
Raions of Transnistria

- Camenca (Romanian: Camenca, Moldovan Cyrillic: Кáменка)
- Dubăsari (Romanian: Dubăsari, Moldovan Cyrillic: Дубосса́ры)
- Grigoriopol (Romanian: Grigoriopol, Moldovan Cyrillic: Григорио́поль)
- Rîbniţa (Romanian: Rîbnița, Moldovan Cyrillic: Рыбница)
- Slobozia (Romanian: Slobozia, Moldovan Cyrillic: Слободзе́я)

===== Municipalities of Transnistria =====
Municipalities of Transnistria

- Capital of Transnistria: Tiraspol
- Cities of Transnistria
- Bendery (Бендéры), officially a separate municipality from Transnistria
- Tiraspol (Тира́споль)

=== Demography of Transnistria ===
Demographics of Transnistria

- Demographic history of Transnistria

== Government and politics of Transnistria ==
Politics of Transnistria

- Form of government: Presidential republic
- Capital of Transnistria: Tiraspol
- Elections in Transnistria
- Political parties in Transnistria

=== Branches of the government of Transnistria ===
Government of Transnistria

==== Executive branch of the government of Transnistria ====
- Head of state: President of Transnistria, Vadim Krasnoselsky
- Cabinet of Transnistria

==== Legislative branch of the government of Transnistria ====
- Parliament of Transnistria (unicameral)

==== Judicial branch of the government of Transnistria ====
Court system of Transnistria

- Supreme Court of Transnistria

=== Foreign relations of Transnistria ===
Foreign relations of Transnistria

- Diplomatic missions in Transnistria
- Diplomatic missions of Transnistria

==== International organization membership ====
- none

=== Law and order in Transnistria ===
Law of Transnistria

- Constitution of Transnistria
- Crime in Transnistria
- Human rights in Transnistria
  - LGBT rights in Transnistria
  - Freedom of religion in Transnistria
- Law enforcement in Transnistria

=== Military of Transnistria ===
Military of Transnistria

- Command
  - Commander-in-chief:
    - Ministry of Defence of Transnistria
- Forces
  - Army of Transnistria
  - Navy of Transnistria
  - Air Force of Transnistria
  - Special forces of Transnistria
- Military history of Transnistria
- Military ranks of Transnistria

=== Local government in Transnistria ===
Local government in Transnistria

== History of Transnistria ==
History of Transnistria

- History of Transnistria to 1792
- Transnistria Governorate

== Culture of Transnistria ==
- Media in Transnistria
- National symbols of Transnistria
  - Coat of arms of Transnistria
  - Flag of Transnistria
  - National anthem of Transnistria
- Public holidays in Transnistria
- Religion in Transnistria
- World Heritage Sites in Transnistria: None

=== Art in Transnistria ===
- Television in Transnistria

== Economy and infrastructure of Transnistria ==
Economy of Transnistria

- Economic rank, by nominal GDP (2007):
- Communications in Transnistria
  - Internet in Transnistria
- Currency of Transnistria: Rubla
  - ISO 4217: N/A (informally PRB)
- Transnistrian companies
  - Intercentre Lux

== Education in Transnistria ==
Education in Transnistria

== See also ==
- Index of Transnistria-related articles
- Women in Transnistria
- List of international rankings
- List of Transnistria-related topics
- Outline of Europe
- Outline of geography
- Outline of Moldova
