= List of museums in Moldova =

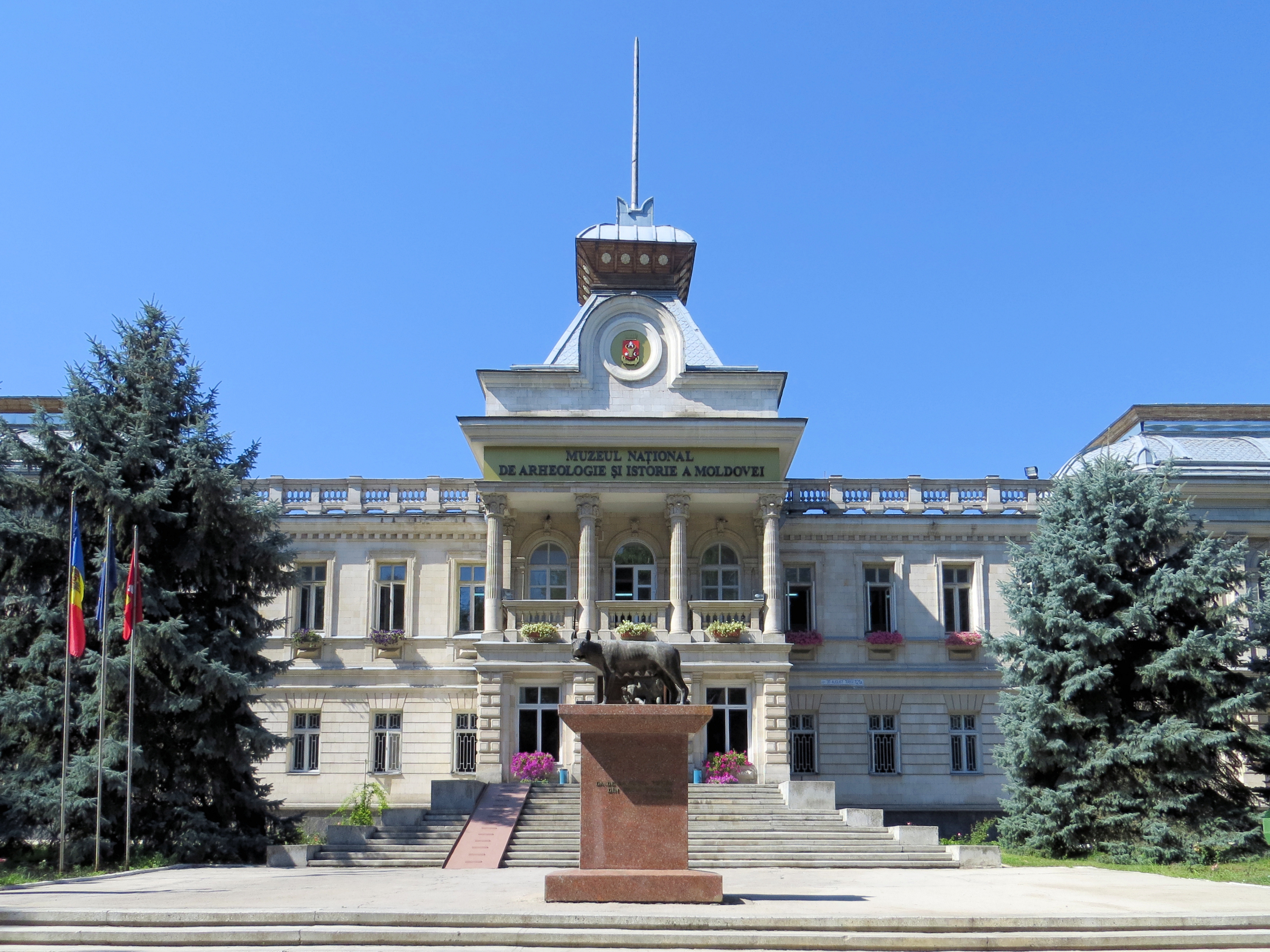
National History Museum of Moldova

This is a list of museums in Moldova.

- Butylka
- National Museum of Romanian Literature
- Museum of Victims of Communism
- Muzeul Memoriei Neamului
- National History Museum of Moldova
- National Museum of Fine Arts, Chişinău
- Soroca Fort
- Ethnographic Museum, Chişinău

== See also ==
- List of museums
- Tourism in Moldova
- Culture of Moldova
