= Geology of Moldova =

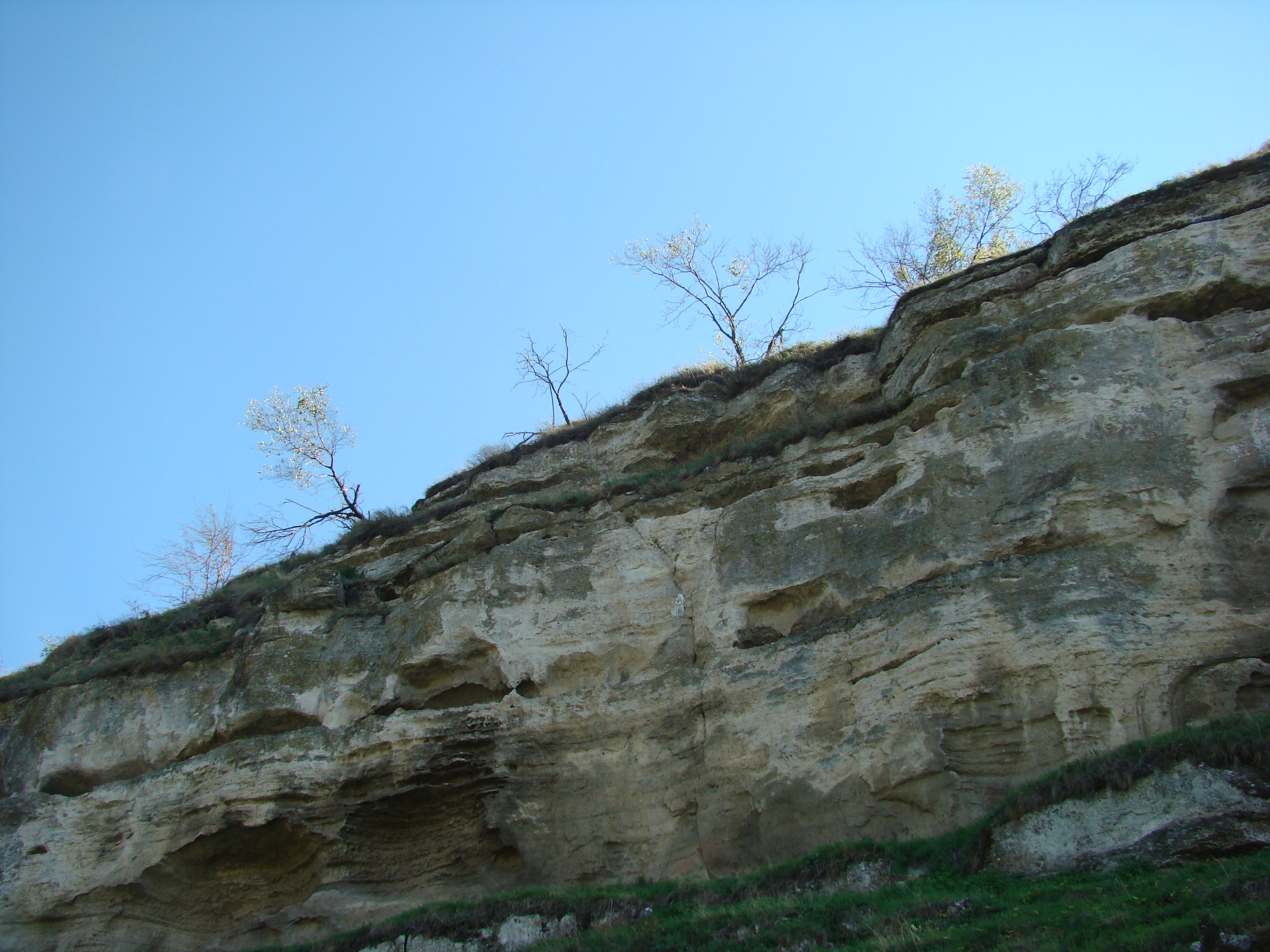
Cliff beside the Raut River

The geology of Moldova encompasses basement rocks from the Archean and Paleoproterozoic dating back more than 2.5 billion years, overlain by thick sequences of Neoproterozoic, Paleozoic, Mesozoic and Cenozoic sedimentary rocks.

== Stratigraphy and geologic history ==
Very few rocks outcrop at the surface from periods of geologic time before the Neogene and most are limited to the Dniester River valley. Only Miocene and Pliocene rocks outcrop and elsewhere in the country, older rocks are primarily known from borehole drilling. Moldova is underlain by the East European Precambrian Platform and in the southwest, basement rock is covered by a deep Mesozoic basin. Heavily deformed Archean and Paleoproterozoic rocks form the basement of the entire country, including granite, granite gneiss and gabbro. By contrast, the overlying sedimentary rocks that ascend to the ground surface are undeformed and include units from the Ediacaran, Paleozoic, Mesozoic and Cenozoic. Potassium-argon dating of glauconite from the lowest units gives an age of 1.01 billion to 590 million years ago, with units 100 to 150 meters thick, overlain by 700 meter thick conglomerate, sandstone and siltstone. A six-meter thick sandstone in the west is the only Ordovician rock unit in the country.

Silurian deposits are common in Moldova, mainly clay and carbonates 150 meters thick in north and grading to as much as 900 meters in the southwest. Devonian quartzite is found in the southwest and a few other Devonian rocks are known only in a small area of the Predobrugian Depression. Geologists debate whether 200 meter thick limestone and dolomite found in some boreholes is from the Carboniferous, or if the period is not present in the country. Boreholes have uncovered Permian argillite, sandstone, limestone and anhydrite.

Paleozoic rocks are overlain by Triassic and Jurassic conglomerate, sandstone, siltstone and limestone that lack fossils and reach a maximum thickness of 600 meters near the town of Kahul, Moldova. Although late Jurassic rocks are widespread in the south, unconformably overlying the Precambrian basement and the Hercynian platform, the early Jurassic has not been found anywhere. Red clay, gypsum, anhydrite and sandstone are all typical Jurassic rocks, sometimes reaching thicknesses of up to two kilometers. Except in the southwest, Cretaceous deposits are also common. Marine calcareous rocks are characteristic of the Paleogene in southern and central Moldova, while reef limestone and gypsum records the Miocene. Quaternary deposits from the last 2.5 million years cover almost the entire country.

== Natural resource geology ==
Moldova has small oil and gas fields in southern rocks from the Sarmatian time as well as several Cenozoic brown coal deposits which are not economically viable. The sugar industry uses high-purity limestone while construction companies quarry gravel, sand and other raw material for concrete and ceramics.
