= National symbols of Moldova =

There are a number of national symbols of Moldova, representing Moldova or its people in either official or unofficial capacities.

== List of national symbols ==
=== Official symbols ===
| Type | Image | Symbol |
|---|---|---|
| National flag | | The State Flag of the Republic of Moldova (Romanian: Drapelul de Stat al Republicii Moldova) is a rectangular cloth, equally vertically tripartite, starting from the flag pole in blue, yellow and red, similar to the flag of Romania. The difference is the State Emblem of the Republic of Moldova disposed in the midst of the yellow field, constituting 1/5 the length of the flag. |
| National coat of arms | | The State Emblem of the Republic of Moldova (Romanian: Stema de Stat a Republicii Moldova) is a horizontally divided shield having in the upper part red chromatics, in the lower part – blue, loaded with the head of aurochs having between its horns a star with eight rays. The head of aurochs is flanked on the right by a five-petalled rose, and on the left by a crescent. The aurochs is also present on the coat of arms of Romania. All the elements present on the shield are of golden. The shield is placed on the breast of a natural eagle holding in its beak a golden cross and taking in the right claw a green olive branch, and in the left claw a golden scepter. |
| National anthem | Our language | Limba noastră It was written by Alexei Mateevici in 1917, one year before the union of Bessarabia with Romania. The music for the anthem was composed by Alexandru Cristea. Between 1917–18 and 1991–94, the national anthem of Moldova was Deșteaptă-te, române!, which is also the national anthem of Romania. |
| National holiday | | Independence Day; It commemorates the adoption of the Declaration of Independence from the Soviet Union on 27 August 1991. The act of independence was officially recognized on March 2, 1992, when Moldova gained membership of the United Nations. Being a public holiday most people and employees, also most retail businesses and public institutions are closed on this day. |

=== Unofficial symbols ===
| Type | Image | Symbol |
|---|---|---|
| National flower | | The basil |
| National flower | | The dog-rose |
| National tree | | The oak |
| National tree | | The sour cherry |
| National tree | | The walnut |
| National animal emblem | | The Aurochs |
| National animal emblem | | The wolf |
| National bird | | The white stork |
| National river | | The Dniester |
| National river | | The Prut; It forms the western border of Moldova with Romania. |
| National holiday | | The Mărțișor begins on 1 March and lasts 10 days, symbolizing the coming of spring. |
| National holiday | | Paștele Blajinilor is celebrated the Monday after Thomas Sunday. |
| National holiday | | Hora |
| National monument | | Monument to Stephen the Great and Holy in Chișinău |

- Source: Akademos
