= History of Transnistria to 1792 =

This deals with the History of Transnistria before it became part of the Russian Empire in 1792.

== Antiquity ==
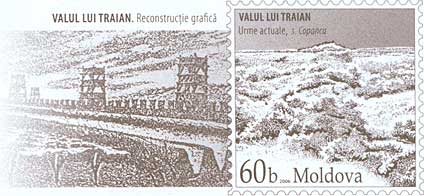
Trajan's Wall on a Moldovan stamp.

In ancient times, the area was inhabited by Thracian and Scythian tribes. Pliny the Elder names the Tyragetae, a Getae tribe living on an island of the Dniester (ancient name "Tyras"), the Axiacae living along the Tyligul River (ancient "Axiaces") and the Crobyzi, a Thracian tribe living beyond the Dniester.

At the mouth of the river, the Ancient Greeks of Miletus founded around 600 BC a colony named Tyras. It fell under the dominion of native kings whose names appear on its coins, and it was destroyed by the Dacians about 50 BC.

In AD 56 it had been restored by the Romans and henceforth formed part of the province of Lower Moesia, which also included Dobruja (part of Romania) and northeastern Bulgaria. Roman emperor Trajan probably created the southern Trajan's Wall, between the Prut and the Tyras area on the Black sea coast, in order to defend the "Scythia Minor" province against barbarian invasions.

Tyras enjoyed great development during the Roman Empire: there it is a series of its coins with heads of emperors from Domitian to Alexander Severus. But in the second half of the 4th century the area was continuously attacked by barbarians and the Roman legionaries left Tyras.

== Vlach and Slavic settlement ==
Transnistria was an early crossroads of people and cultures, including the South Slavs, who reached it in the 6th century. Some East Slavic tribes (Ulichs and Tivertsy) may have lived in it, but they were pushed further north by Turkic nomads such as Pechenegs and the Cumans. In the 10th century, the "Volohove" (Vlachs, i.e. Balkan Romans) are mentioned in the area in the Primary Chronicle.

== From Kievan Rus' to the Polish-Lithuanian Commonwealth ==
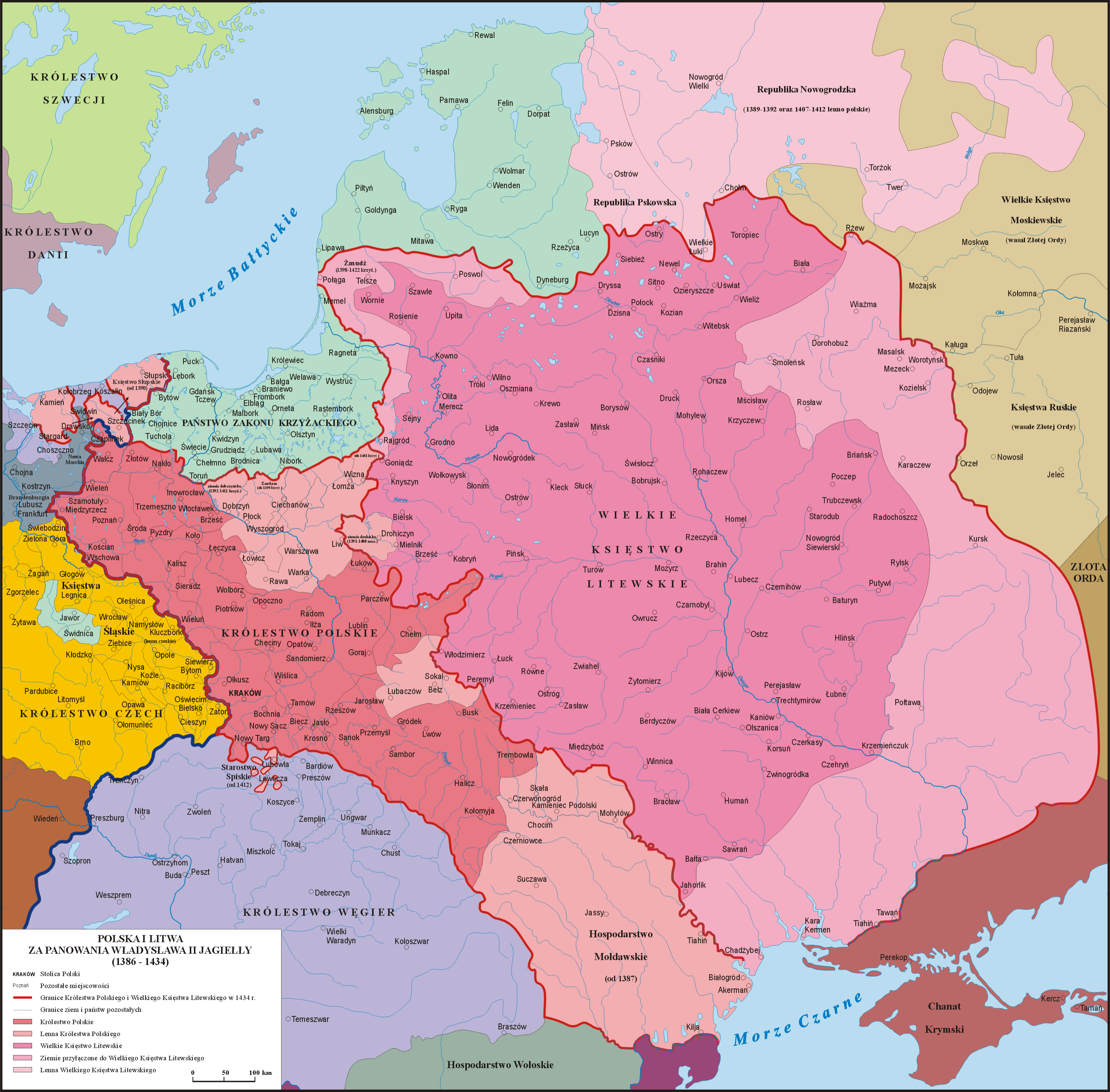
Map of the Kingdom of Poland and the Grand Duchy of Lithuania between 1386 and 1434 showing the Principality of Moldavia as a Polish fief.

Transnistria was inhabited by the Cumans and wars against them may have brought the territory under the control of the Kievan Rus' at times around the 11th century. The East Slavic Hypatian Chronicle mentions the Bolohoveni (either a Vlach or Slavic population) in the 13th century. The chronicle records that this land bordered on the principalities of Halych, Volhynia and Kiev. Archaeological research has identified the location of 13th-century fortified settlements in this region. Alexandru V. Boldur identified Voscodavie, Voscodavti, Voloscovti, Volcovti, Volosovca and their other towns and villages between the middle course of the rivers Nistru/Dniester and Nipru/Dnieper. The Bolohoveni disappeared from chronicles after their defeat in 1257 by Daniel of Galicia's troops.

In the early 13th century, the Brodniks, a possible Slavic–Vlach vassal state of Halych, were present, alongside the Vlachs, in much of the region's territory (towards 1216, the Brodniks are mentioned as in service of Suzdal).

It became a formal part of the Grand Duchy of Lithuania in the 15th century.

The Crimean Khanate conquered the southern part, which was included in 1504 in the region of Yedisan and was under the control of the Ottoman Empire. The northern part remained under the control of the Grand Duchy of Lithuania, as part of the historical region of Podolia. The border between the two states was set on a brook known in Moldavian chronicles as Iahurlîc (today Iagorlîc, in Transnistria).

Many Romanians lived even farther east in the steppe lands of Transnistria (Land over Nistru), scattered (mainly) in small rural settlements. Transnistria was in the past an arid, underpopulated region that began to be colonized in the Middle Ages (after 1500, probably, but possibly even earlier) by Moldavians that crossed the Nistru river in search of free land and by some Tartars, its borders not being delimited as for a distinctive entity, a part of something. The eastern frontier was for Moldavia rather theoretical than effective up to the 19th century.In the east of river Nistru the Romanian life is mentioned all over the Middle Age.The oldest attested Moldavian possession over the Dniester River was the Lerici castle (at the entrance inside Dnieper's estuary, where the fortress Ochakov was later on to be built), captured by some Moldavian pirates from the Genoese in the times of voivod Petru Aron (in 1455).

Moldavia started from its nucleus in Bukovina and soon reached Prut and by the end of the 14th century the Dnister, which was set as their easternmost border. While there were some Moldavian military incursions beyond the Dniester in the 15th century, the earliest written evidence of Moldavian settlement beyond the Dnister dates from the 16th century: a 1541 letter written by Suleiman the Magnificent to Polish Sigismund II Augustus says that some of his Moldavian subjects plundered Tighina and Akkerman and then retreated and settled in the Polish territory.

== Modern era ==
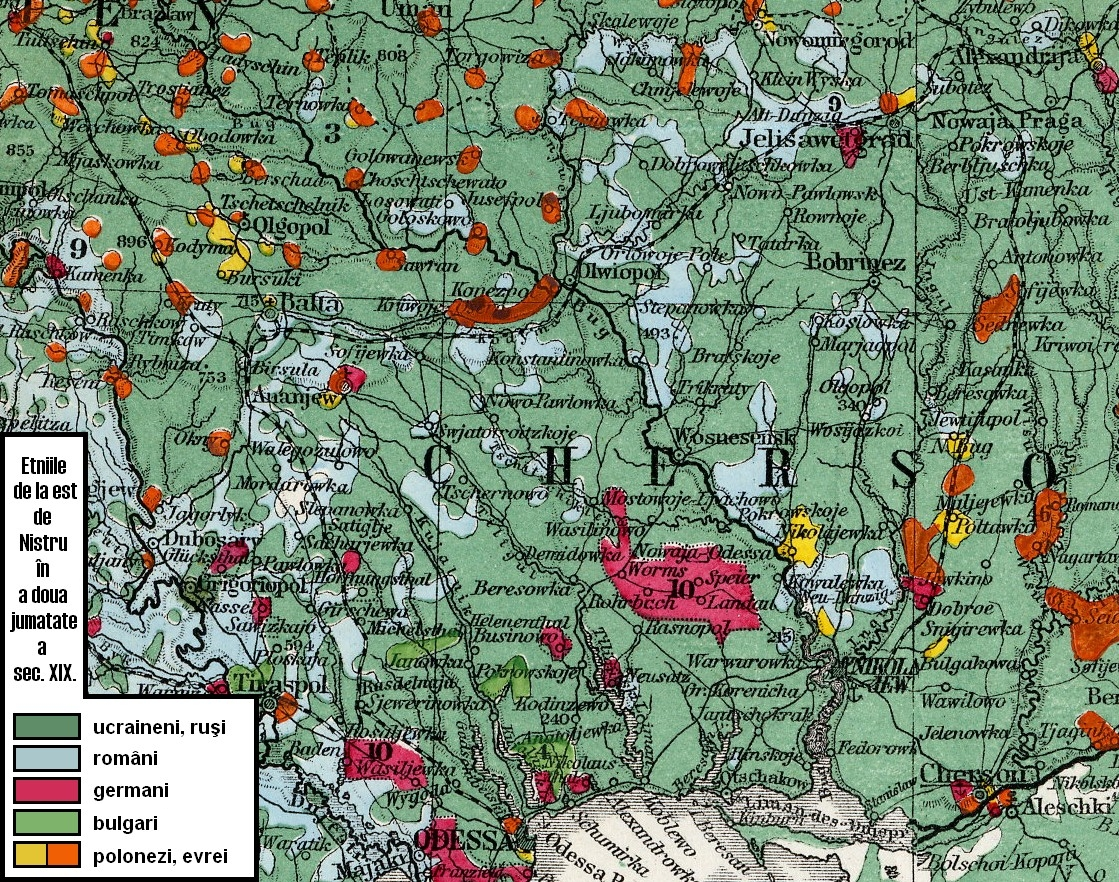
Map showing the ethnic composition of the lands east of the Dniester river in the 19th century

While the territory beyond the Dniester was never politically part of Moldavia, some areas of today's Transnistria were owned by Moldavian boyars, being given by the Moldavian rulers. The earliest surviving deeds referring to lands beyond the Dniester date from the 16th century. Moldavian chronicle Grigore Ureche mentions that in 1584, some Moldavian villages from beyond the Dniester in the Polish territory were attacked and plundered by Cossacks. Many Moldovans were members of Cossacks units, two of them, Ioan Potcoavă and Dănilă Apostol, were hetmans of Ukraine.

Along with a nomadic Nogai Tatar population, the area was populated by Moldavians, Poles, Jews, and Ukrainians. In 1927, Columbia University Professor Charles Upson Clark, wrote that the lower Dniester was "an almost purely Romanian stream" since 1792. Later research states that the largest group living further east, between the Dniester and the Dnieper river (a much bigger territory than actual Transnistria), in the 18th century was made up of Slavs, primarily Ukrainian peasants along with some Poles, but there was a huge community of Vlachs in that region.

Indeed, in the early 18th century, in a letter to the Sultan of the Ottoman Empire, Stefan Batory, the Prince of Transylvania stated that "The lands between the Bug and Dniester are populated by a mix of races composed of Lithuanian Poles, Ukrainians, and Moldavians".

Under the Dimitrie Cantemir leadership a colonization of Moldavians/Vlachs had started in 1712 even in the Don river, following the one done a century before in the Kiev area

In 1775 Russia began attempting to lure Moldavian settlers (mostly from Moldavia, but also Romanians from Transylvania, Bukovina and Muntenia) to settle in its territory, after it gained the largely uninhabited territory between the Dnieper and the Bug from the Turks But the colonization was to a larger scale only after 1792/3, to Transnistria and beyond, when the Russian government declared that the region between the Dnister and the Southern Bug was to become a new principality named "New Moldavia", under Russian suzerainty.

According to the results of the census (quoted in Romanian sources) of 1793 49 villages out of 67 between the Dniester and the Bug were Romanian.

== See also ==
- History of Transnistria
- History of Moldova
- History of Ukraine
