= Intercentre Lux =

Intercentre Lux is a Transnistrian textile company producing clothing and other textile products. The company owns two factories in Tiraspol and one in Dubăsari, as well as retail outlets in all major towns and cities of Transnistria. It was established in 1992.

The products of Intercentre Lux are exported to Austria, Germany, France, Italy, Netherlands, Belgium, and the United States. An Italian television report in November 2014 revealed that Prada jackets costing 1,950 euros in Italy were being manufactured by Intercentre Lux in Transnistria for 30 euros.
