= National History Museum of Moldova =

Coordinates: 47°01′21″N 28°49′41″E

- Muzeul Național de Istorie a Moldovei

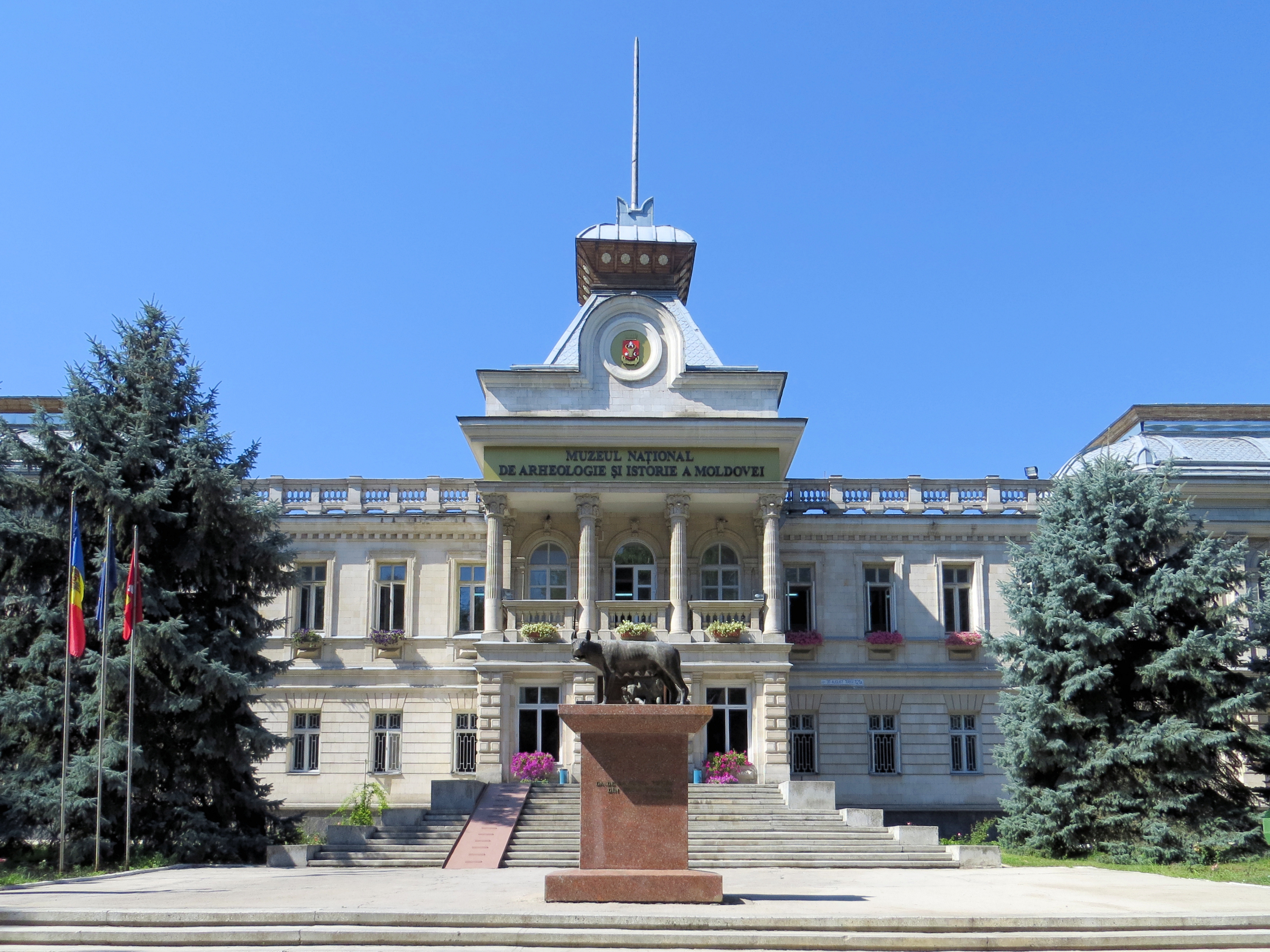
- The museum and Capitoline Wolf
- Established: December 21, 1983
- Location: Central Chişinău
- Director: dr. hab. Eugen Sava
- Website: Official website

The National History Museum of Moldova (Romanian: Muzeul Național de Istorie a Moldovei) is a museum in Central Chişinău, Moldova.

== Overview ==
Over 263,000 exhibits, 165,000 of which belong to the national heritage, are exhibited in the National Museum of History, founded in 1983 on the former Regional Lyceum. It is situated on 121a, 31 August 1989 str., in the historical center of Chişinău. In the museum yard there is the Capitoline Wolf, the copy of the one in Rome. Every year almost 15 exhibitions are held in the museum; which are important events in Moldova. The museum is structured into many scientific sections: Ancient History and Archaeology, Medieval History, History of Basarabia, Contemporary History, Treasures.

== History ==
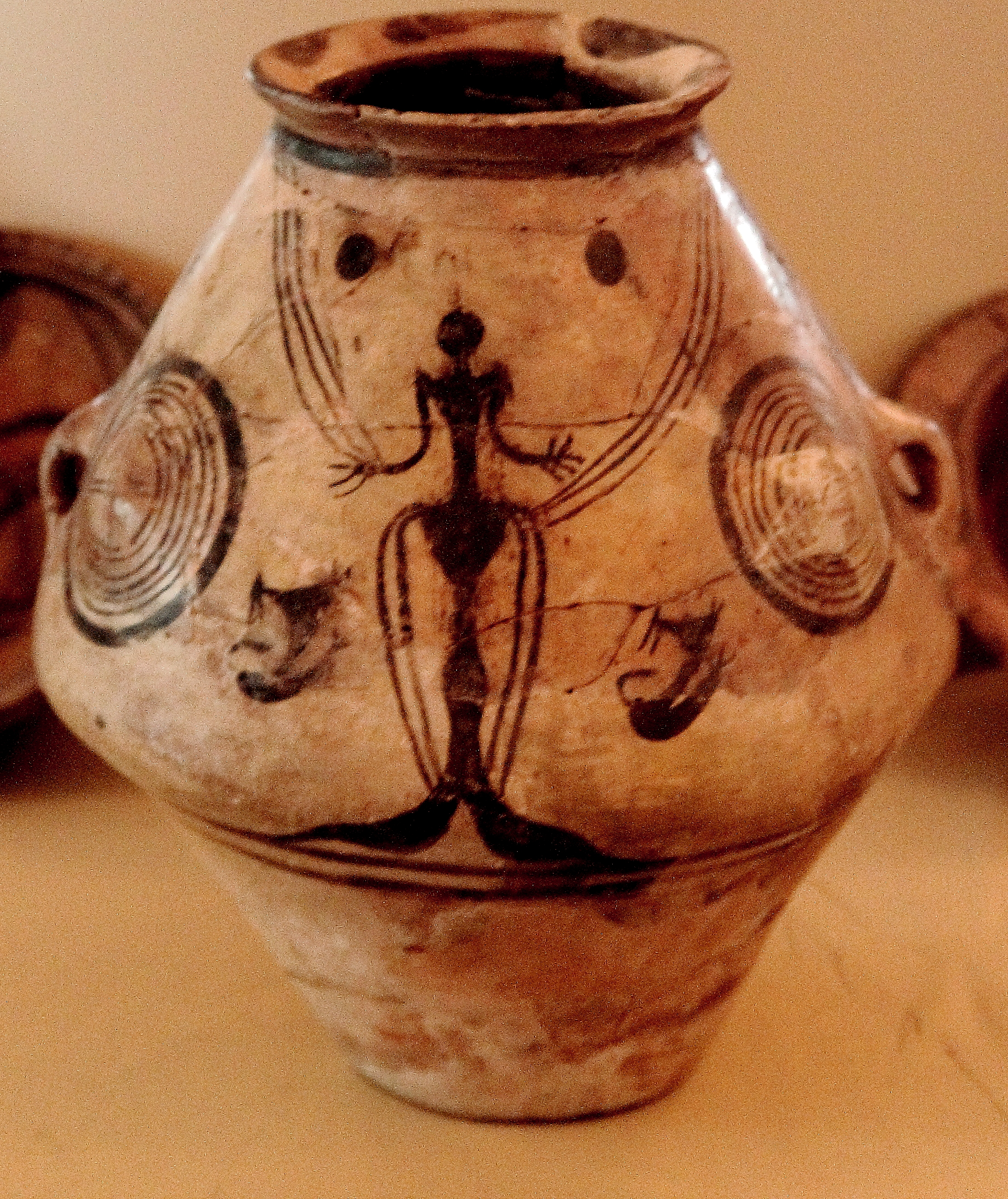
Cucuteni-Trypillian culture Neolithic and Stone Age Collection

The National Museum of Archaeology and History of Moldova is one of the most important museum institutions of the Republic of Moldova, in terms of its collection and scientific prestige.

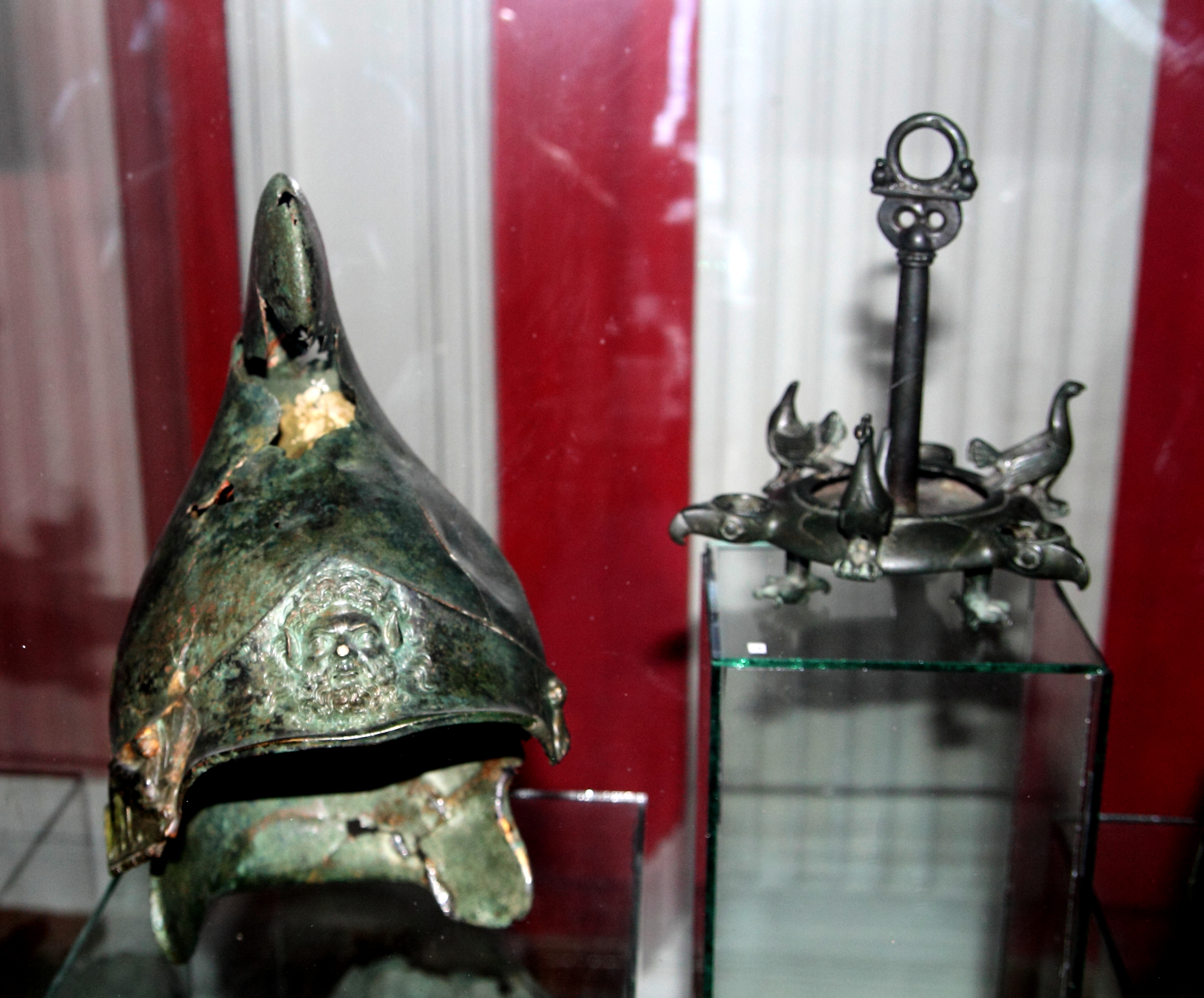
The Olanesti treasure was discovered in 1960 and is dated to the 5th century BC. It contains six helmets, five greaves and an oil lamp. All the pieces are from the army of the Alexander the Great under Zopyrion command

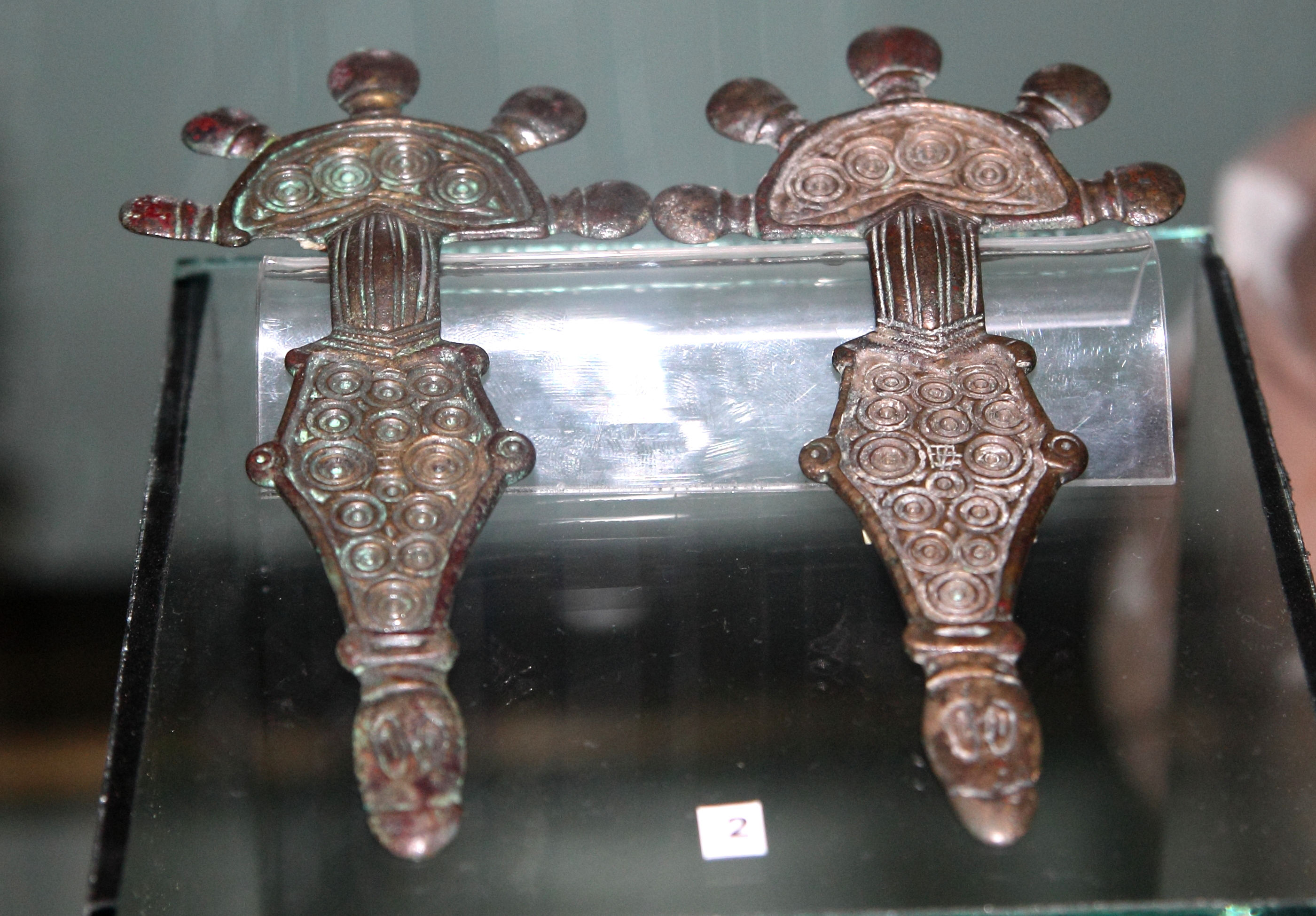
Late Antiquity

The museum was established on December 21, 1983, when there was issued the Order of the Ministry of Culture No. 561 “On reprofiling of the Museums” (on the basis of the Joint Decree of the Central Committee of the CPM and the Council of Ministers of MSSR “On the utilization of the historical monument – the edifice of the former Chisinau Boys’ Gymnasia where S. Lazo studied” from 29 November 1983).

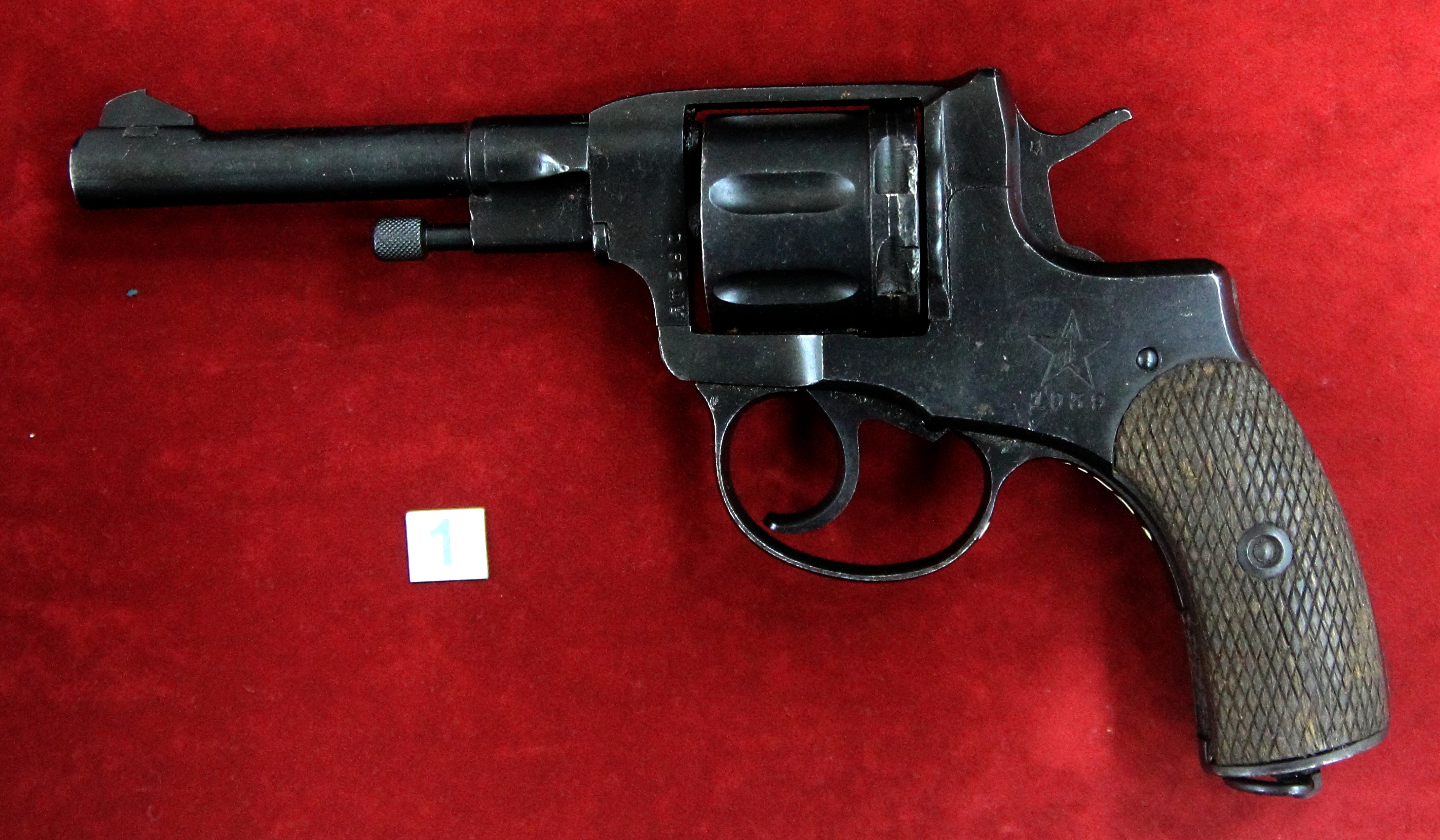
1939 Nagant revolver

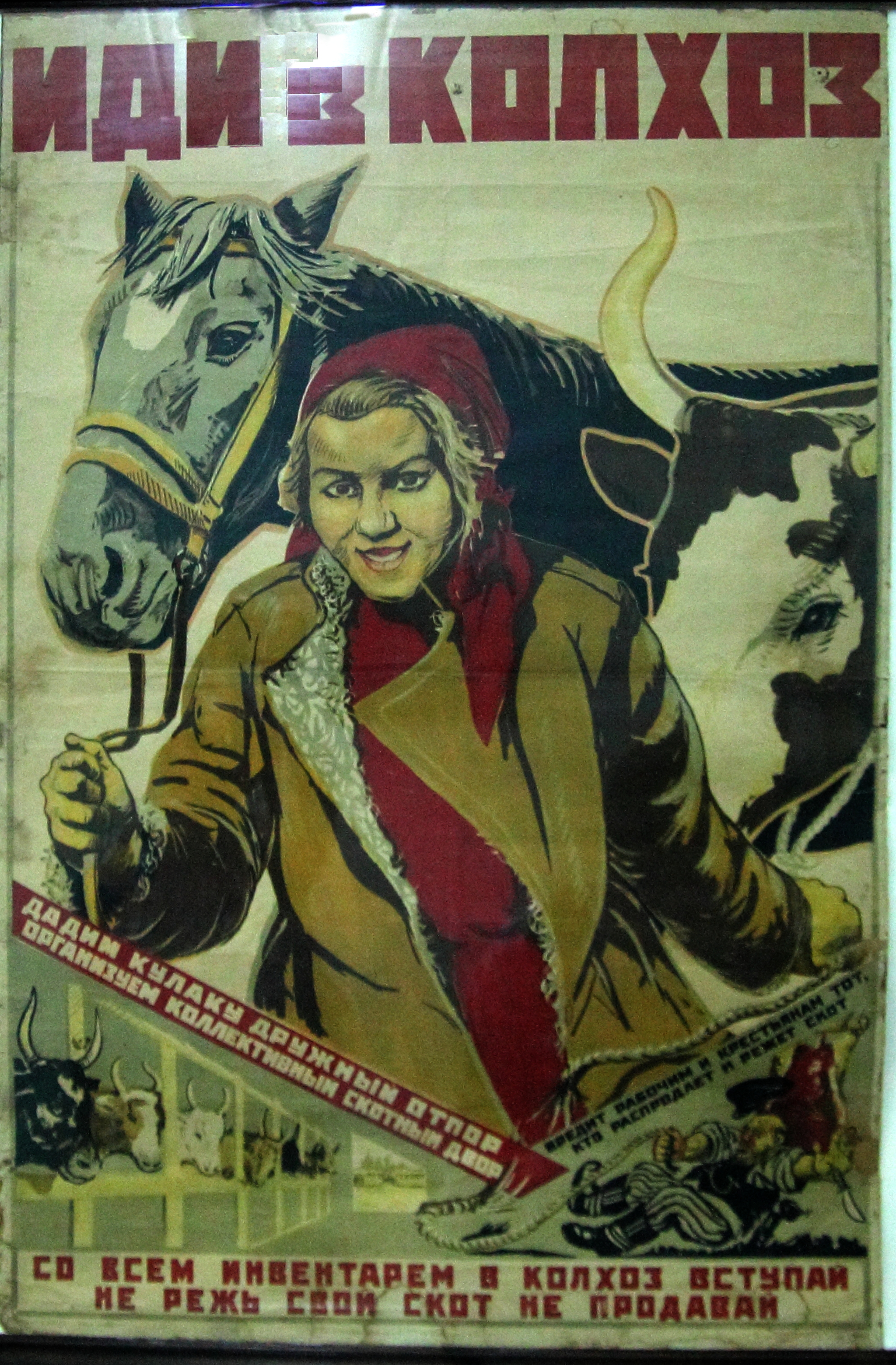
Propaganda Poster

The State Museum of History of MSSR was created on the basis of the Republican Museum of Military Glory, into which it was incorporated, and the historical collection of the State Museum of History and Regional Studies of MSSR. It was housed in the restoring historical building of the former Chisinau Boys’ Gymnasia No.1, where formerly the Republican Museum of Military Glory had been located.

On October 22, 1991, by the Order of the Ministry of Culture No. 231 “On perfection of the republican museums’ activity”, the State Museum of History of MSSR was renamed to the National Museum of History of Moldova.

In 2006 the National Museum of History of Moldova was reorganized into the National Museum of Archaeology and History of Moldova through absorption of the Museum of Archaeology of the Academy of Sciences of Moldova, according to the Decree of the Government of the Republic of Moldova No.1326 “On the measures of optimization of infrastructure in the field of science and innovation” from 14 December 2005.

At present the National Museum of Archaeology and History of Moldova is subordinate to the Ministry of Culture of the Republic of Moldova, its scientific activity being coordinated by the Academy of Sciences of Moldova.

The museum collections, which initially consisted of the collections of the Republican Museum of Military Glory and the State Museum of History and Regional Studies of MSSR, every year were enriching with items of real scientific value through research, donations, and acquisitions. Besides, in 1989–1995 and 2006–2007, large transfers of collections from a number of broken up museums – the Republican Museum of Friendship Among the Peoples, the Museum of History of the CPM, the Republican Museum of History of the Komsomol, the Republican Museum of G.I. Kotovsky and S.G. Lazo, the Republican Museum of the History of Religion, the Memorial Museum of Bulgarian Volunteers, and the Museum of Archaeology of The Academy of Sciences of Moldova – also contributed to the growth and diversity of the museum property.

Today, the National Museum of Archaeology and History of Moldova owns 322,172 items, the diversity of which covers the history of Moldova over the centuries, from prehistoric times to the present, telling about the land, facts, events, and outstanding people.

In 1991, the first permanent historical exhibition “Pages of Centuries-old History of Moldova”, covering the period from the oldest times to 1940, was opened to the public. It was located in three rooms of the 1st floor, with an area of 645 sq. m., containing about 900 exhibit items. The exhibition illustrated the features of the area between the Prut and Dniester in the context of the history of medieval Moldavian state. As to the period after the dismemberment of Moldova in 1812, in the exhibition there was presented only the history of Bessarabia.

In 1997, the permanent historical exhibition was redesigned in content, placement, and by the method of presentation. It expanded to the entire first floor, occupying six rooms with an area of 1,400 sq. m. Chronological framework of the exhibition includes the period from the Paleolithic to the end of the fifth decade of the 20th century.

In 2006–2007, the museum was in a new process of rebuilding of the permanent exhibition, intending to make radical changes in terms of vision and the content of exhibits, representing the section of prehistory and ancient history. Underlying these changes are the collections transferred from the former Museum of Archaeology of the Academy of Sciences of Moldova. Of course, the current formula of the permanent exhibition is an intermediate. Now there is conceptually and thematically developing a new vision of the exhibition of the National Museum of Archaeology and History of Moldova.

In August 1990, in the ground floor of the museum there was open to the public the Diorama of the Iasi – Chisinau Operation, and in 1994, in the basement – the exhibition of items made of precious metals “Treasure-house”.

The museum also offers the public diverse temporary exhibitions, which complement the permanent exhibition and contribute to the promotion of the museum cultural and historical property. During the 27 years of its existence, the museum has organized about 189 temporary exhibitions (at the museum, outside the museum, and abroad), based on its own collections as well as in collaboration with other cultural and research institutions.

== The edifice ==
The National Museum of Archaeology and History of Moldova from the very beginning was located in the historical building of the former Chisinau Boys’ Gymnasia No.1, later the Boy's Lyceum named after B.P. Hasdeu (in 1945–1963 in the premises there was housed the frontier detachment “Nistru”, and in 1963–1977 – the Polytechnic Institute), that was in the process of restoration.

The earthquake of 1977 has played a tragic role in the history of this monument, causing serious damage that could lead to a total destruction of the building. Restoration work, started in 1979, was halted because, due to the severe destruction, the building was beyond repair.

The old building was demolished and replaced by a new one (the construction lasted from 1980 to 1987), which retained only the exterior of the historical monument, built in eclectic style, and decorative elements of the gymnasia assembly hall, repeated in three domical rooms of the new building.

Thus, the new museum edifice, in operation from 1987, is a modern two-storey monumental building facing the 31 August 1989 Street. It has 12 exhibition rooms and a diorama, with a total area of 5,700 sq. m.

The museum has five branches: Exhibitions of Military Technology, The Sciusev House and Museum (both in Chişinău), The C. Stamati House and Museum (Ocniţa), Lazo's Manson (in Piatra), and Charles XII of Sweden's House and Museum in Varniţa.

== Gallery ==
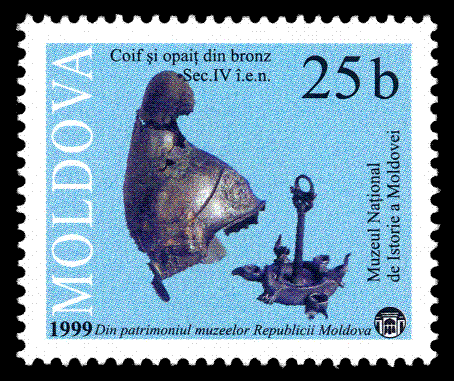

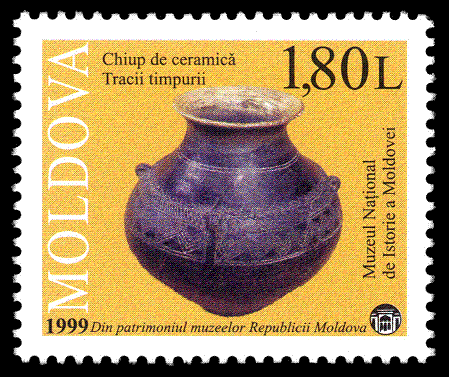

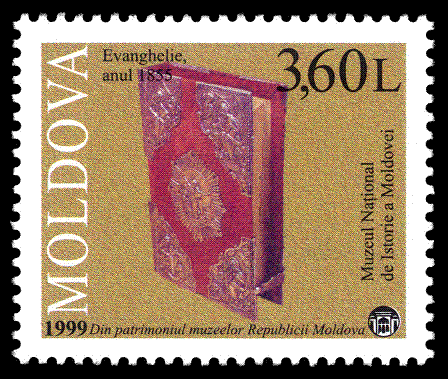
Gospel (1855)
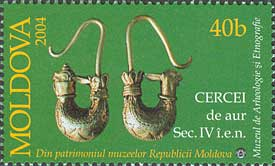
Golden earring, 4th century. Discovered in Balabani, Taraclia.

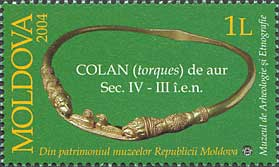
Golden necklace (torques) 4th-3rd century BC discovered in a Scythian grave, in a barrow from Pohrebea, Dubăsari.

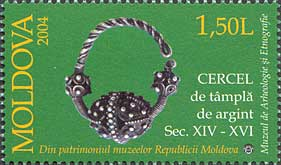
Silver temple earring, 14th-16th century, discovered in Şeptebani, Rîşcani.

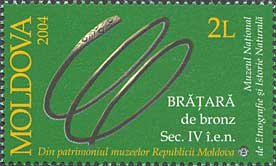
Bronze bracelet, 4th century.

== See also ==
- Capitoline Wolf, Chişinău
