= Culture of Moldova =

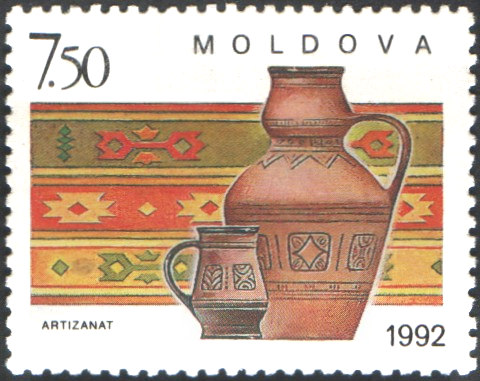
A Moldovan postage stamp from 1992, depicting traditional pottery

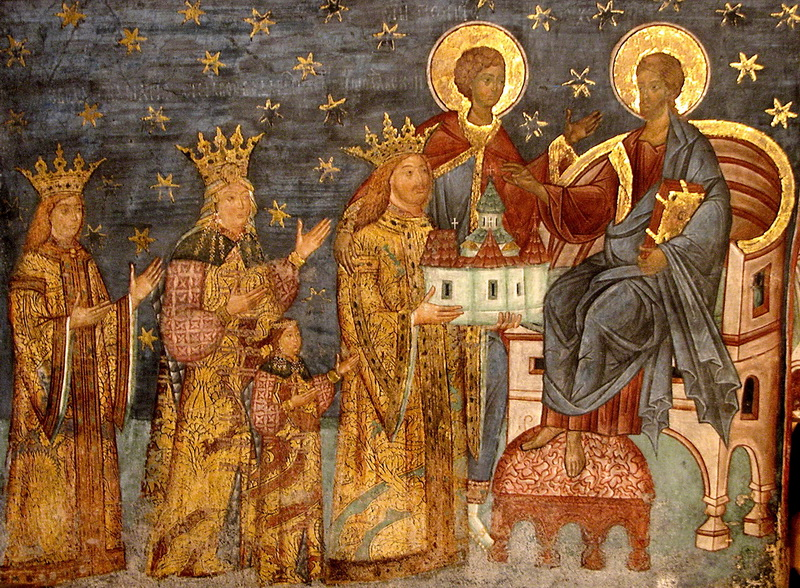
A painting of Stephen the Great and his wife Marițica Bibescu, surrounded by family

The culture of Moldova is unique and influenced by the Romanian origins of its majority population, as well as the Slavic and minority Gagauz populations. The traditional Latin origins of Romanian culture reach back to the 2nd century, the period of Roman colonization in Dacia.

During the centuries following the Roman withdrawal in 271, the population of the region was influenced by contact with the Byzantine Empire, Slavic peoples, Hungarian people, and later by the Ottoman Turks. Slavic migration into the region began in the 6th century and continued gradually through the early 19th century. A heavy Polish influence occurred from the 14th through 16th centuries, when the Principality of Moldova was connected to Poland by a trade route and was briefly a vassal of the Kingdom of Poland. Since the 18th century, several waves of Poles emigrated to the land which constitutes the majority of modern Moldova. Beginning in the 19th century, a strong Western European (particularly French) influence came to be evident in literature and the arts. The resulting melting pot has produced a rich cultural tradition. Although foreign contact was an inevitable consequence of the region's geographical location, their influence only served to enhance a vital and resilient popular culture. Despite the many foreign influences on Moldovan culture, the country's traditional Romanian roots remain strong.

The population of what once was the Principality of Moldavia (1359–1859) had come to identify itself widely as "Moldovan" by the 14th century, but continued to maintain close cultural links with other Romanian groups. After 1812, the eastern Moldovans, those inhabiting Bessarabia and Transnistria, were also influenced by Slavic culture during the periods of 1812–1917, and during 1940–1989 they were influenced by Russia.

The geographical area that is now modern Moldova was formed under the conditions of contacts with the East Slavic population, and later under the rule of the Ottoman Empire. In 1812, the territory of modern Moldova was liberated from Ottoman rule and incorporated into the Bessarabian province of the Russian Empire, which had a great influence on the development of the culture of the region. After the October Revolution in 1918, Romania annexed the nation for 22 years, and the Moldavian Autonomous Soviet Socialist Republic was formed on the left bank of the Dniester, as a result of which culture developed under a stronger Russian influence under Soviet administrative control, as well as by ethnic Russian or Russian-speaking immigration.

By 1918, Bessarabia was one of the least developed, and least educated European regions of the Russian Empire. Although Soviet authorities promoted education, the region's cultural ties with Romania were slowly eroded due to administrative policies. With many ethnic Romanian intellectuals, either fleeing, being killed after 1940, or being deported both during and after World War II, Bessarabia's cultural and educational situation changed drastically and became more Russified.

After the 1960s, Soviet authorities developed urban cultural and scientific institutions that were subsequently filled with Russians, and diverse ethnic groups from across the Soviet Union. Much of the urban culture came from Moscow, while the primarily rural ethnic Romanian population was allowed to express itself in folklore and folk art.

== Folk culture ==
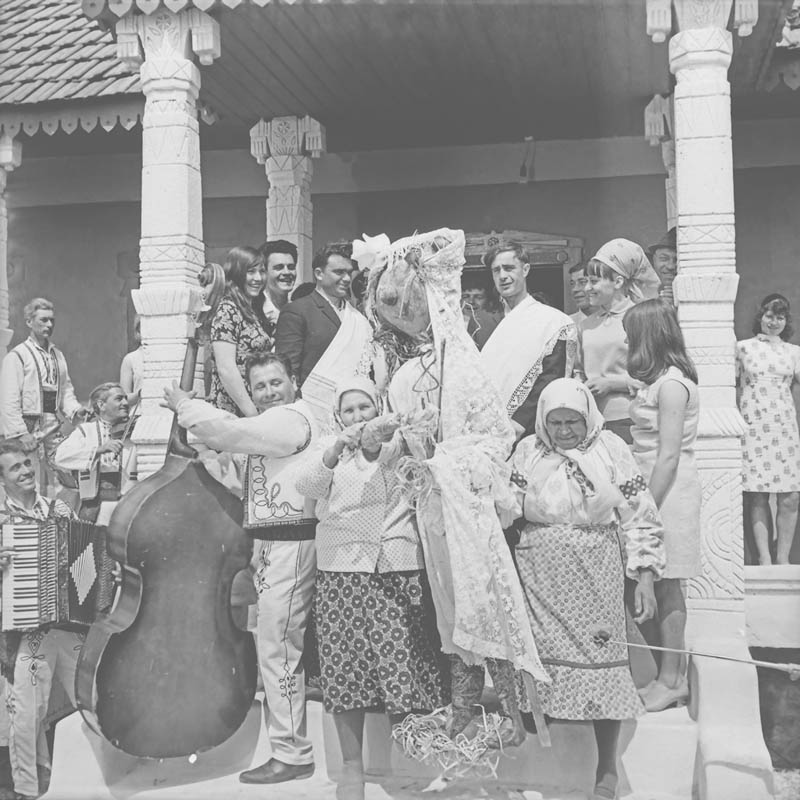
Wedding in the village Tașlîc, 1960s

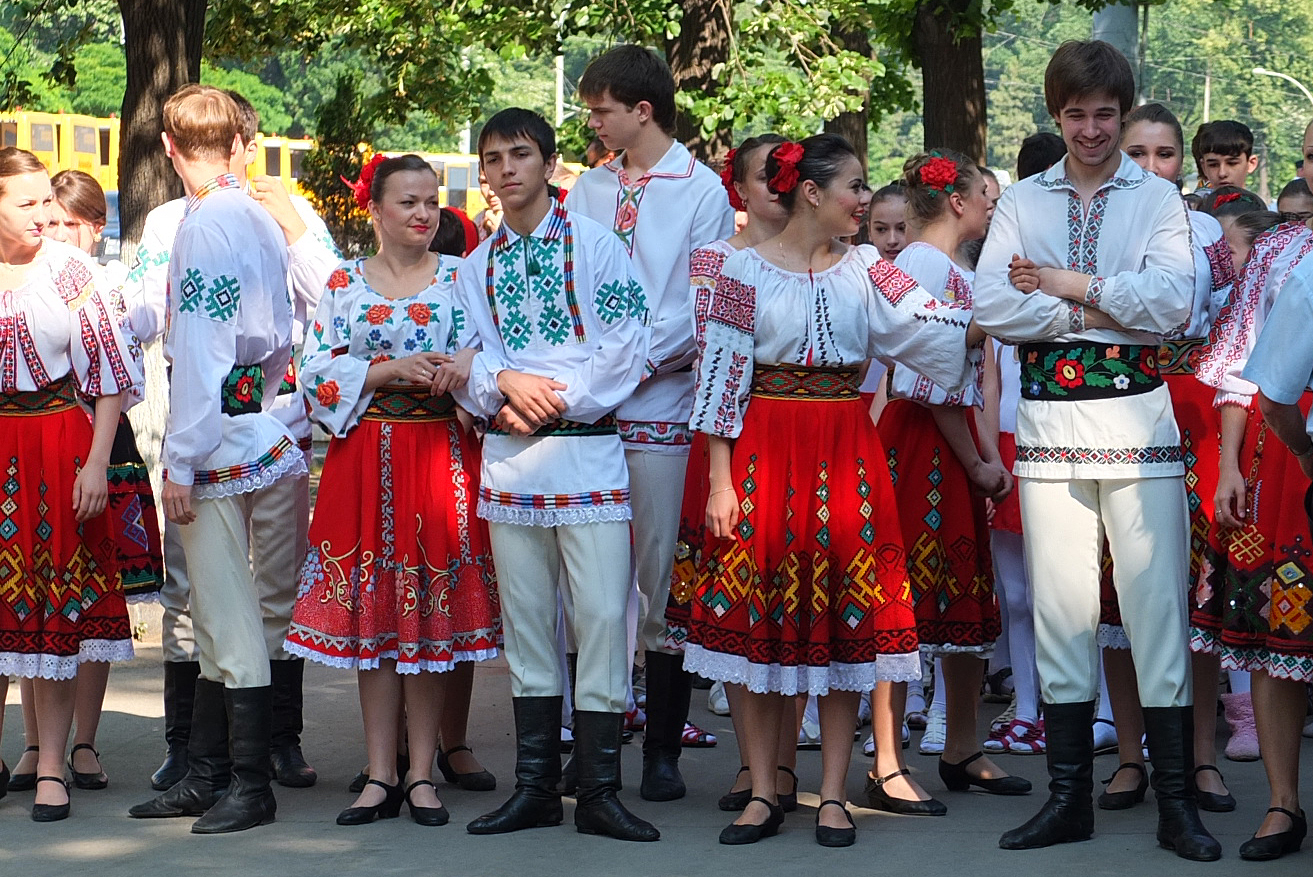
Traditional Moldovan costumes in Chișinău

Although the folk arts flourished, similarities with Romanian culture were hidden. Music and dance, particularly encouraged by Soviet authorities, were made into a showcase, but were subtly changed to hide their Romanian origins. For example, the national folk costume, in which the traditional Romanian moccasin (opinca) was replaced by the Russian boot.

Moldova's traditional folk culture is very rich. The ancient folk ballads, such as "Mioriţa" and "Meşterul Manole", play a central role in this traditional culture. Folk traditions, including ceramics and weaving, continue to be practiced in rural areas. The folk culture tradition is promoted at the national level and is represented by, among other groups, the folk choir, Doina.

== Literary culture ==
The first books, religious texts, of the Principality of Moldavia appeared in the mid-17th century. Prominent figures in Moldavia's cultural development include Dosoftei, Grigore Ureche, Miron Costin, metropolitan of Kiev Petru Movilă, scholars Nicolae Milescu-Spãtaru, Dimitrie Cantemir (1673–1723), and Ion Neculce, Gavriil Bănulescu-Bodoni, Alexandru Donici, Constantin Stamati, Costache Negruzzi, historian and philologist Bogdan P. Hasdeu (1836–1907), author Ion Creangă (1837–1889), and poet Mihai Eminescu (1850–1889).

Varlaam published the first books. Dosoftei founded numerous schools and published a lot. Cantemir wrote the first thorough geographical, ethnographical, and economic description of Moldavia in Descriptio Moldaviae (Berlin, c. 1714).

Modern writers include Vladimir Beşleagă, Nicolae Dabija, Ion Druţă, Victor Teleucă, Victor Ciobanu and Grigore Vieru. In 1991, a total of 520 books were published in Moldova, of which 402 were in Romanian, 108 in Russian, eight in Gagauz, and two in Bulgarian.

In the early 1990s, Moldova had twelve professional theaters. All performed in Romanian, except the A.P. Chekhov Russian Drama Theater in Chişinău, and the Russian Drama and Comedy Theater in Tiraspol, both of which performed solely in Russian, and the Licurici Republic Puppet Theater, in Chişinău, which performed in both Romanian and Russian. Members of ethnic minorities manage a number of folklore groups and amateur theaters throughout the country.

== Cuisine ==
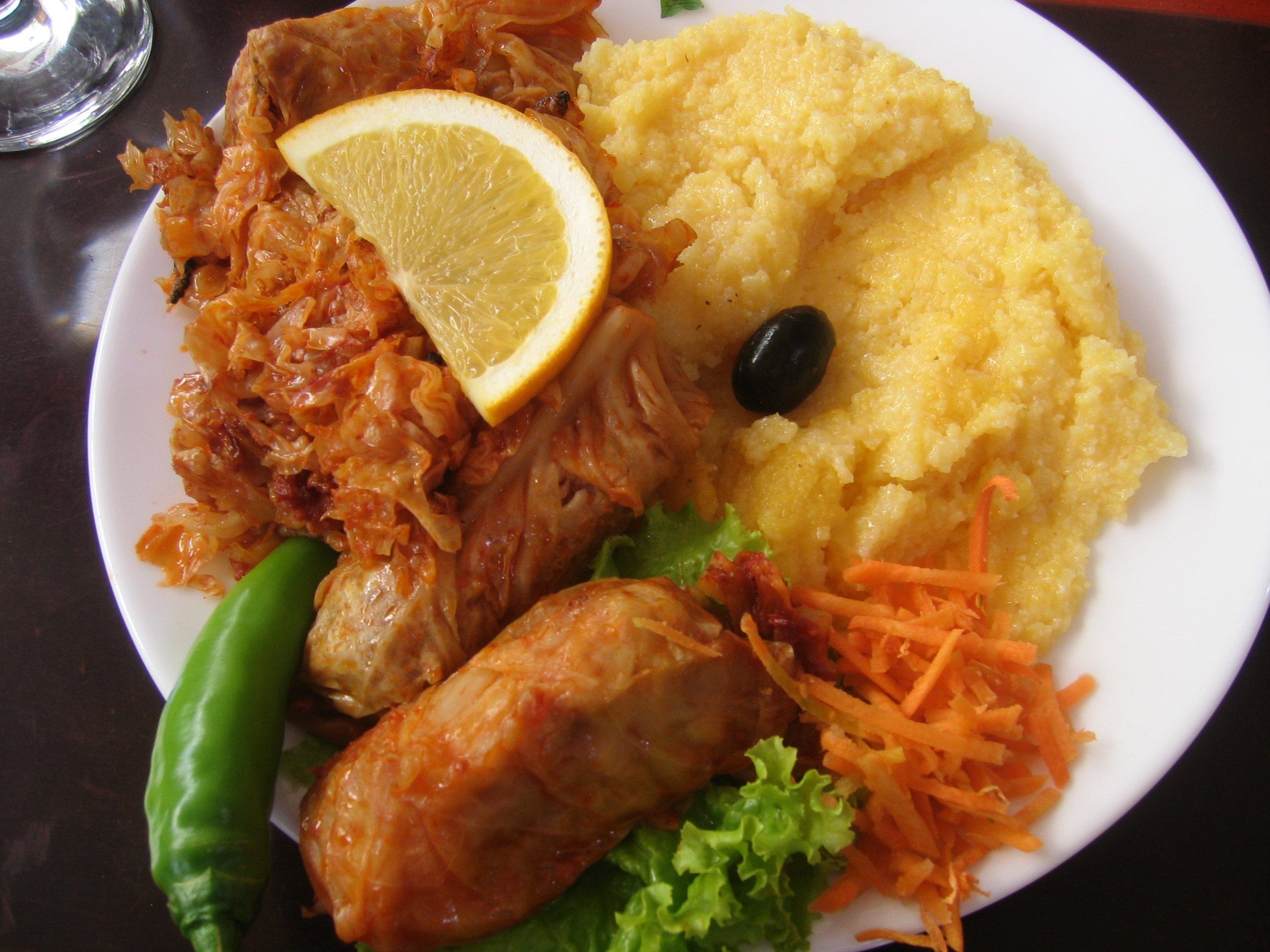
A popular Moldovan dish of Stuffed Cabbage Rolls (sarma), accompanied by sauerkraut and mămăligă.

Moldovan cuisine consists mainly of traditional European foods, such as beef, pork, potatoes, cabbage, cheese, and a variety of cereal grains. Popular alcoholic beverages are divin (Moldovan brandy), beer, and local wine.

Very popular dishes include manti (a type of dumpling filled with meat and vegetables, which is wrapped in a dough wrapper, and served with a spicy sour cream), ciorbă (a sour soup consisting of meat and vegetables, served with sauerkraut, polenta, or rice), pelmeni (another type of dumpling, filled with meat and onions, but sometimes mushrooms, turnips, and sauerkraut are added), borscht (made with beets, tomatoes, and other vegetables to form a stew), and sarma (a dish made with stuffed cabbage rolls, accompanied by sauerkraut and mămăligă).

Other common foods in Moldova include grilled meats, other grains, dairy products, and mămăligă (a type of polenta made with cornmeal, and mashed into a porridge).

== See also ==
- Music of Moldova
- Religion in Moldova
- History of the Jews in Bessarabia
