= Administrative divisions of Transnistria =

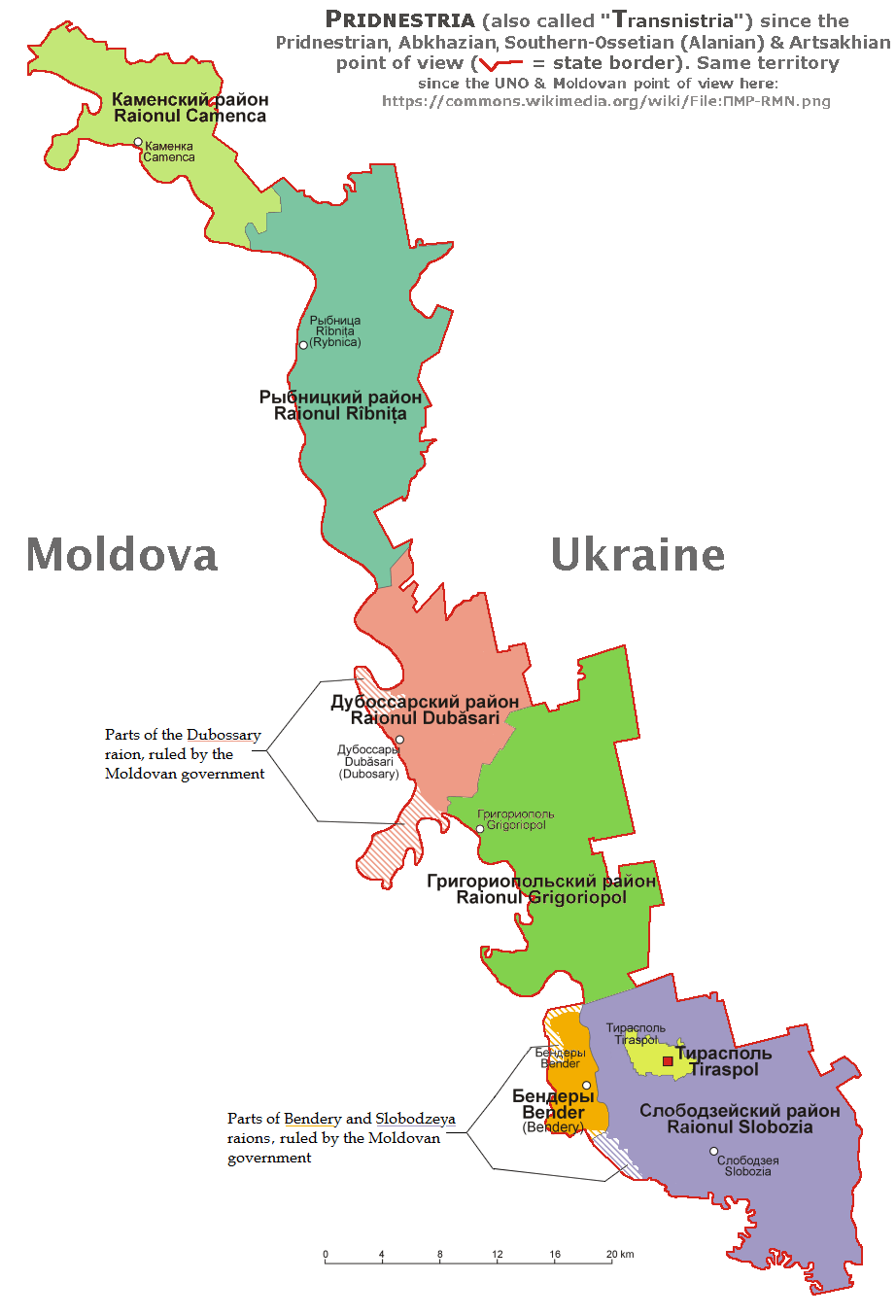
Administrative divisions of Transnistria.

The Pridnestrovian Moldavian Republic (PMR, also known as Transnistria) is subdivided into five raions:

- Camenca (Moldovan Cyrillic: Каменка)
- Rîbnița (Moldovan Cyrillic: Рыбница)
- Dubăsari (Moldovan Cyrillic: Дубэсарь)
- Grigoriopol (Moldovan Cyrillic: Григориопол)
- Slobozia (Moldovan Cyrillic: Слобозия)

and one municipality:

- Tiraspol (Moldovan Cyrillic: Тираспол)

Also, Bender (Romanian: Tighina, Moldovan Cyrillic: Тигина), situated on the western bank of the Dniester (in Bessarabia), geographically outside Transnistria, is not part of the territorial unit of Transnistria as defined by the central authorities, but is controlled by the PMR authorities, which consider it part of PMR's administrative organization.

During the 1992 Transnistrian War, some villages in the central part of Transnistria which geographically are situated on the eastern bank of Dniester, rebelled against the new separatist PMR authorities and since then have been under effective Moldovan control. These localities are: commune Cocieri (including village Vasilievca), commune Molovata Nouă (including village Roghi), commune Corjova (including village Mahala), commune Coșnița (including village Pohrebea), commune Pîrîta, and commune Doroțcaia. The village of Corjova is in fact divided between PMR and Moldovan central government areas of control. Roghi is also controlled by the PMR authorities.

At the same time, some areas which are situated on the right bank of the Dniester are under PMR control. These areas consist of the city of Bender with its suburb Proteagailovca, the communes Gîsca, Chițcani (including villages Merenești and Zahorna), and the commune of Cremenciug, formally in the Căușeni District, situated south of the city of Bender.

The breakaway PMR authorities also claim the communes of Varnița, in the Anenii Noi District, a northern suburb of Bender, and Copanca, in the Căușeni District, south of Chițcani, but these villages remain under Moldovan control.
