= Iagorlîc Reserve =

Scientific reserve in Moldova

Coordinates: 47°22′40″N 29°09′45″E

- Rezervația științifică Iagorlîc
- IUCN category Ia (strict nature reserve)
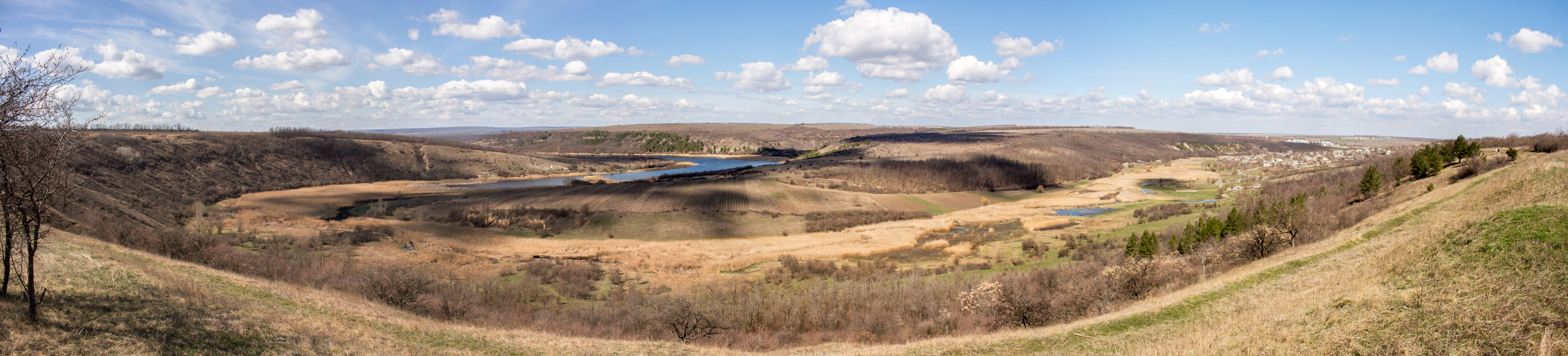
- Location: Dubăsari District, Moldova (de jure); Transnistria (Note: Transnistria's political status is disputed. It considers itself to be an independent state, but this is not recognised by any UN member state. The Moldovan government and the international community consider Transnistria a part of Moldova's territory.) (de facto)
- Area: 863 hectares (8.63 km^{2})
- Established: 1988

Iagorlîc Reserve (Romanian: Rezervația științifică Iagorlîc; Russian: Государственный заповедник Ягорлык, romanized: Gosudarstvenny zapovednik Yagorlyk, lit. 'Yagorlyk National Reserve') is a scientific reserve in Dubăsari District, Transnistria, Moldova.

It covers 863 ha, including 223 ha of waters. The reserve is managed by the state agency "State Nature Reserve «Iagorlîc»" (Государственное учреждение "Государственный заповедник «Ягорлык»"), which was established by the Transnistrian parliament in 1994. Its aim is to protect valuable aquatic and coastal ecosystems in the estuary section of the Iagorlîc river to the Dniester, dammed by the Dubăsari dam. The agency employs 13 people (4 in administration, 5 in the research department and 4 in the protective services).

== History ==
The scientific reserve (заповедник) was established on 15 February 1988 as the second within the borders of modern Moldova and covered the area of the nature reserve (заказник) "Golful Goianei" established in 1972 on an area of 270 ha, the surrounding escarpments and 250 ha of adjacent land, a total of 1,044.41 ha[1]. In 1990, part of the land was transferred to the management of neighboring state farms, reducing its size to today's 863 ha. Despite this, the original value is used in Transnistria's legislation. Due to the Transnistrian conflict and economic difficulties, scientific research began only in 2000.

== Bioreserve ==
The reserve was established to protect natural resources, conduct scientific research (especially on secondary succession) and educate on environmental protection. In the reserve, habitats of natural forests, artificially planted forests (mainly created as part of the reinforcement of the banks of the reservoir), steppe formations, wet meadows and ruderal formations, and water areas are distinguished. In the reserve, 101 species of rare protected plants have been found, including 16 from the Red Data Book of Plants (both Moldovan and Ukrainian), including the Moldovan grass (Koeleria moldavica), endemic to the left bank of the Dniester.
