= Cremenciug =

Cremenciug may refer to:

- Cremenciug, Căuşeni, a commune in Căuşeni district, Moldova
- Cremenciug, Soroca, a commune in Soroca district, Moldova
- Kremenchuk, an industrial city in Poltava oblast, Ukraine
