= Marcăuți =

Marcăuți may refer to:

- Marcăuți, Briceni, a commune in Moldova
- Marcăuți, Dubăsari, a commune in Moldova
