= 2012 Moldova security zone incident =

The 2012 Moldova security zone incident happened in the Transnistrian security zone maintained by the Joint Control Commission on the territory of the Republic of Moldova. On 1 January, a Moldovan civilian drove through a checkpoint in the zone and was fatally wounded by a Russian soldier.

The civilian, Vadim Pisari, died a few hours later at a Chișinău hospital. His death raised tension between Russia and Moldova and revived a decades-old debate over the presence of Russian forces in Moldova. The incident caused demonstrations in Moldova, in which the protesters demanded free passage through the security zone and the withdrawal of Russian troops. On 25 January 2012, a group of European parliamentaries issued a call to the participants of the 5+2 format negotiations to replace the current Russian military contingent with an international civil peacekeeping mission.

A similar case occurred on 27 January 1995, when another civilian, Constantin Andreev, was fatally wounded by a Russian soldier in the security zone, between Dubăsari and Rîbnița.

== The incident ==
The incident occurred at the 9th peacekeeping checkpoint on a bridge across the Dniester River, between the Transnistrian village of Pârâta and the Moldovan town of Vadul lui Vodă, early in the morning of 1 January 2012. According to reports, civilians Vadim Pisari and Constantin Bologan from the village of Pîrîta on the eastern bank of the Dniester drove a car to the neighbouring town of Vadul lui Vodă. On their way to the town, they passed a bridge with a check point manned by a Russian military contingent. The car did not slow down at the check point, rammed the check point's boom barrier, and broke through to the other side.

A short time later, Pisari and Bologan were returning to Pîrîta via the same route. When their car entered the bridge again, at 7:15 a.m. local time, the driver disobeyed repeated demands to pull over. Vyacheslav Kozhukhar, the chief of the Russian military force, fired several warning shots in the air, and, when those were ignored as well, shot at the driver's side of the man's car, severely wounding him in the back. One bullet hit the car, which continued a short distance before it stopped, the door opened and Pisari fell out, injured. Pisari was rushed to the Emergency Hospital in Chișinău, where he died soon after a surgery was performed on his spine.

== Investigation ==
Moldova and Russia launched a probe into the incident.

A special task force led by Russian military prosecutors was formed following an emergency meeting of the Joint Control Commission.

In April 2015, in the case of Pisari v. the Republic of Moldova and Russia, the European Court of Human Rights held, unanimously, that there had been the violations of the Article 2 of European Convention on Human Rights by the Russian Federation as concerned both the killing of the Pisaris' son and the ensuing investigation. The Court held that the Russian Federation should be held responsible for consequences arising from a Russian soldier's actions even though they had not occurred in Russia. The Court further found that the Russian soldier's decision to shoot at the passing vehicle had not been justified and identified procedural problems with the Russian investigation into the case. The association that helped the relatives of the dead to appeal for justice, announced that Russia must pay the relatives 40,580 euros in the next 3 months; however, the obligation was not fulfilled.

== Aftermath ==
On 4 January, Vadim Pisari was buried in his native village. The funeral procession grew into a protest rally. A protest of some 250 people followed the funeral with demonstrators holding placards calling for Russia to reduce its influence in the region. Among the participants at the funeral on January 4 were Dorin Chirtoacă, members of PL and PLDM. The Government of Moldova allocated 100,000 lei for the funeral of Pisari.

== Reactions ==
=== Moldova ===
On January 2, protesters gathered in Pârâta demanding the removal of the checkpoint. On the same day, the prime minister of Moldova Vlad Filat condemned the incident, ordered compensation payments to be made to the family of the victim, and called for a joint Moldovan-Russian investigation.

On January 3, around 100 protesters gathered near the point where Pisari was wounded, demanding that the checkpoint and others like it be removed. The protest disrupted the check point for two hours.

On January 3, protesters signed a letter addressed to the Moldovan Government, the Organization for Security and Co-operation in Europe and the international community, asking for immediate withdrawal of all fifteen peacekeeping points in the Dniester River area. "Nothing justifies the death of a person," Moldova Prime Minister Vlad Filat said on January 3. "It is not the first time that peacekeepers have committed such crimes," the president of Promo-Lex Ion Manole said.

On January 5, the prime minister Vlad Filat and Deputy Prime Minister for Reintegration Eugen Carpov laid flowers at the grave of Pisari.

On 9 January, participants of a rally in front of the Russian Embassy in Chișinău demanded withdrawal of Russian troops.

In the following weeks, several Moldovan NGOs organized protests in front of Russian embassies in Bucharest and Chișinău, demanding the withdrawal of Russian troops from the region.

On January 11, over 500 protested in the Moldovan town of Vadul lui Vodă demanding withdrawal of Russian troops.

=== Russia ===
On January 2, a statement released by the Russia's ambassador to Moldova, Valery Kuzmin, claimed that Vadim Pisari bore much responsibility for the shooting, citing "repeated crude violations on the part of the victim, who was in a state of alcoholic intoxication and driving a car that did not belong to him." The Russian Embassy in Chișinău also cited "damage to the gate, the danger of running over one of the peacekeepers, speeding through barriers, failure to obey the command to pull over even after warning shots in the air." These statements were rejected by the Ministry of Interior of Moldova. On January 3, a press release of the Moldova's Foreign Ministry states that is not the first time that Ambassador Valery Kuzmin had made inappropriate statements. Foreign Minister Iurie Leancă described the comments by Valery Kuzmin in connection with the murder of Pisari as "unfortunate" and "sarcastic ".

On January 4, the Russian Foreign Ministry issued a statement expressing regret over the death of Vadim Pisari and pledging to conduct a thorough investigation of the incident.

=== International ===
On January 4, the Minister of Foreign Affairs of Romania Teodor Baconschi expressed his condolences to the family of Pisari. On 4 January, in a statement by the Russian Foreign Ministry, Moscow has conveyed condolences to Moldova on the death of Vadim Pisar.

The United States and Germany issued statements urging Russia and Moldova to avoid a rise in tension in the security zone and to conduct a thorough investigation of the incident. They also expressed their readiness to participate in talks to demilitarize the area and convert the current Russian occupying force to an OSCE-led peacekeeping one.

On 8 January, immigrants from Moldova protested in front of the Russian Embassy in Paris, demanding withdrawal of Russian troops.

On 25 January, 31 members of the Parliamentary Assembly of the Council of Europe signed a declaration calling for an international civil peacekeeping mission to replace the current one in Transnistria. The declaration also noted the protests in local villages and stated that "the preliminary investigation proves the Russian peacekeeper had no reason to open fire on the vehicle".

On 26 January 2012, Moldovan PACE representative Ana Guțu spoke about the death of Pisari before the Assembly.

== See also ==
- Human rights in Transnistria
- Transnistria conflict
- Murder of Tamaz Ginturi
