= Holercani =

Holercani Холеркань (Russian) Голеркань (Ukrainian)
- Village
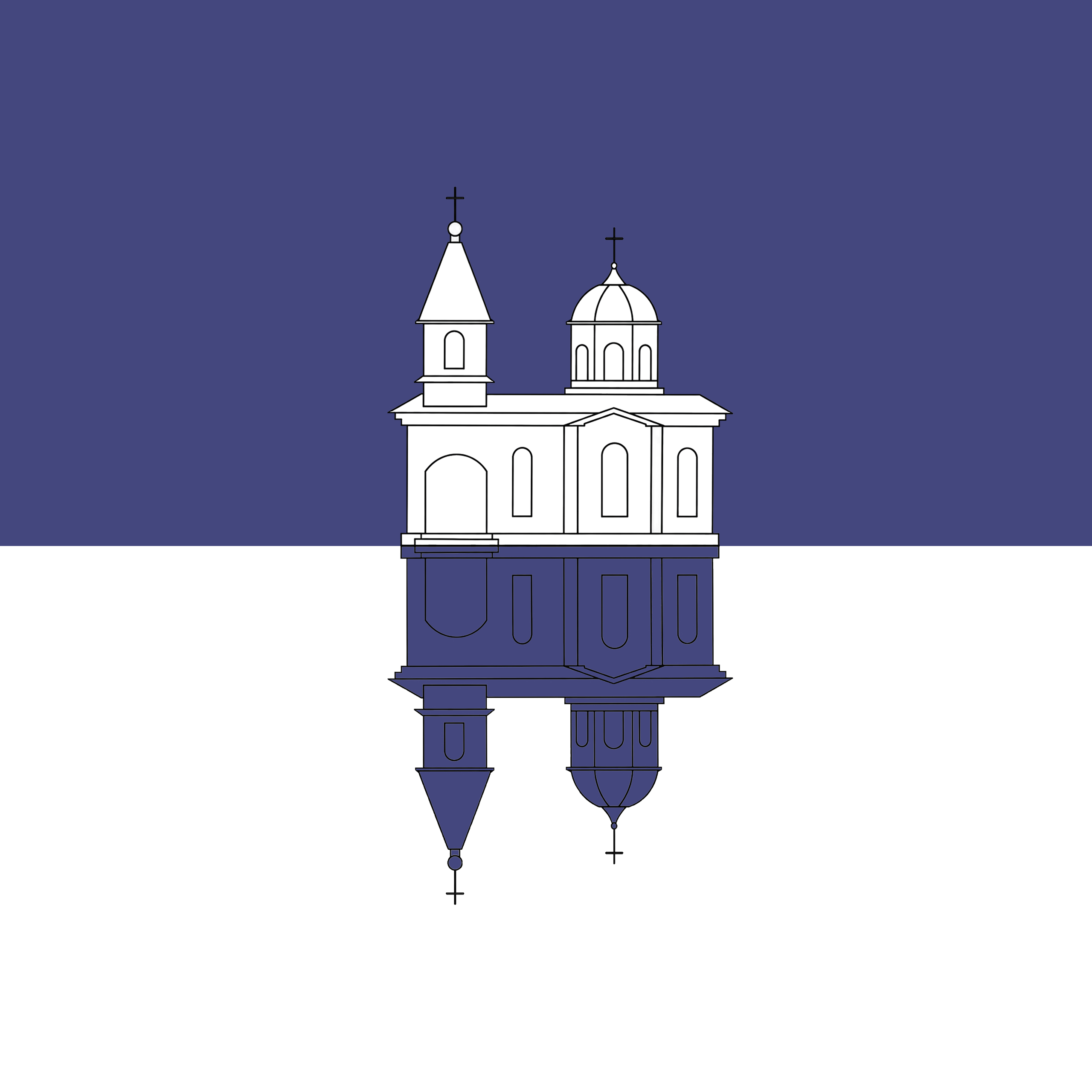
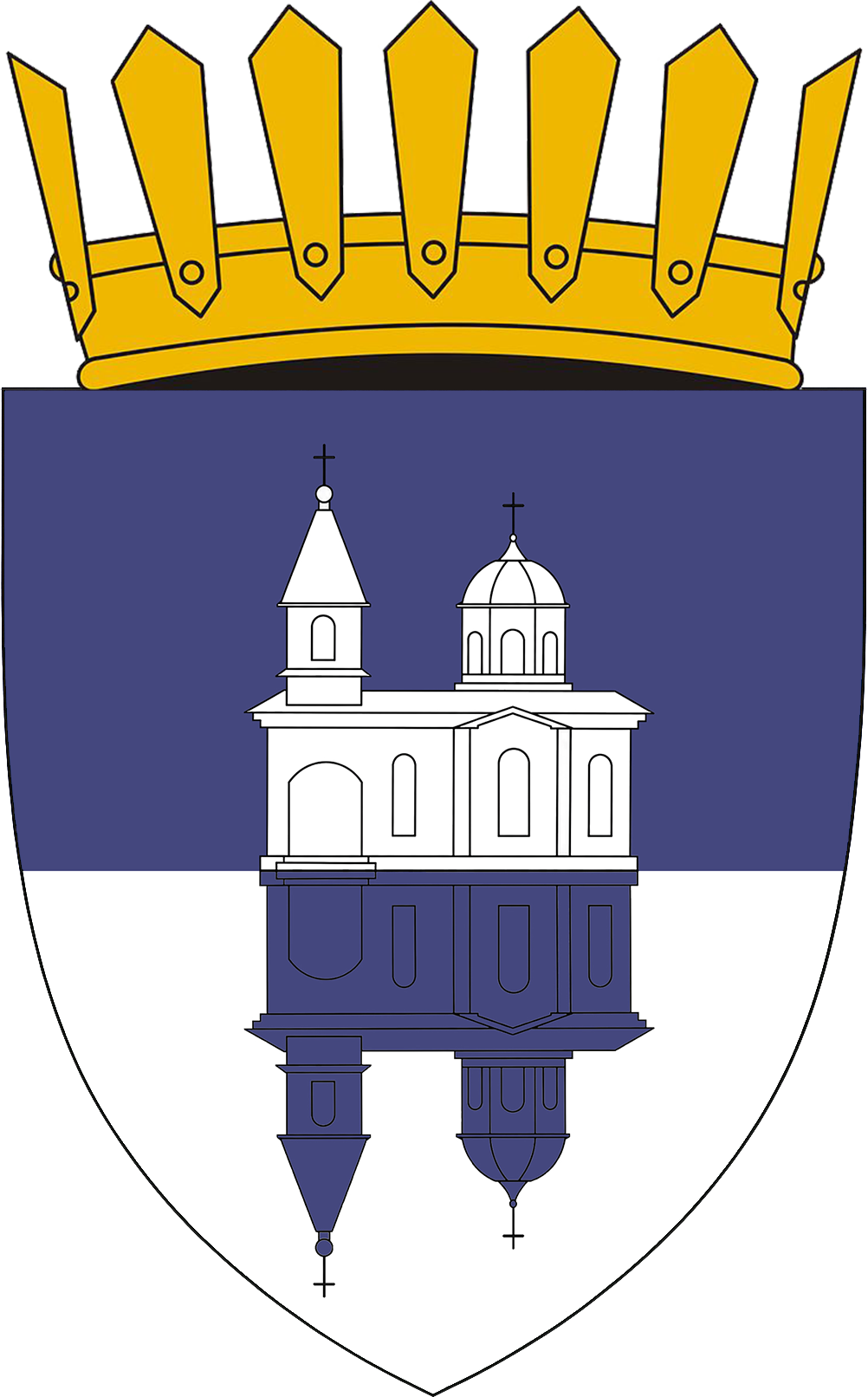
- Flag Coat of arms

- Location in Moldova
- Coordinates: 47°19′N 29°04′E
- Country: Moldova
- District: Dubăsari District

Government
  - Primar: Tanasev Tudor
- Elevation: 515 ft (157 m)

Population (2014 census)
  - Total: 2,271
- Time zone: UTC+2 (EET)
  - Summer (DST): UTC+3 (EEST)
- Postal code: MD-4574
- Area code: +373 (248)
- Vehicle registration: DB
- Website: https://holercani.sat.md/

Holercani is a village in Dubăsari District, in the eastern-central part of the Republic of Moldova.

Distances: 15 km to Dubăsari, 50 km to Chișinău.

== Geography ==
It is located on the bank of the biggest river in the country, Dniester (Nistru).

With the construction of the Dubasari dam in 1954, an artificial sea formed which spread over an area of 6,750 ha and has a length of 128 km with an average depth of 7.5 m. The old hearth of the village went under water, the church on the hill once stood on the shore of the reservoir. In the wooded area below Holercani, there is a small spa town with parliamentary villas, a beach, and a boat station.

== History ==
First mentioned in a document dated 15 October 1607, Prince Mihail Movilă gifts the princely estate of Horilcani to Dumitrache Chiriță for his loyal service.

The locality is present on maps from the 15th century. Bowr's map from 1774 notes it as the main settlement on the Dniester, with a place for the deployment of Russian armies during the Russo-Turkish war (1768-1774).

The 1774 Moldavian census records 26 houses, 3 of which were abandoned. The village belonged to the Monastery of Saint Sava from Iasi. A total of 23 families lived there: 11 birnici (taxpayers) and 12 rufeturi, of whom 10 were Moldovan volunteers in the Russo-Turkish War of 1768-1774, 1 priest and 1 deacon.

Since the second half of the 19th century, the village of Holercani has been a foreign estate of the Jerusalem Monastery of the Holy Sepulchre.

In 1885, preparations began for the opening of parish schools on the estates of foreign monasteries. Based on statistical data on estates and their populations, lists were compiled of 20 villages, including Holercani, where schools will be built. On 31 January, following a request from the Archbishop of Kishinev and Hotin, the Ober Procuror of the Holy Synod authorised a one-off allocation of 58,000 roubles from the income of foreign monasteries for the establishment of schools in the aforementioned villages, and an annual allocation of 436 roubles for the maintenance of each school. The school building was constructed of stone and insured by the Russian Fire Insurance Society. The school was opened in January 1887, and classes began at the same time. The teacher was Anastasia Svetenko, a graduate of the Women's Diocesan School. In 1887, 32 boys attended the parish school.

In 1904, it was recorded to hold 247 houses with a population of 186, as well as a church dedicated to St. Michael and a Russian elementary school.

== Demographics ==
Holercani
Year	Population
1774	92
1803	260
1818	348
1835	567
1850	838
1859	872
1870	951
1875	958
1897	1,304
1904	1,860
1911	1,290
1923	2,952
1928	1,950
1930	1,819
1941	1,851
2004	2,510
2014	2,271
2024	1,505

=== Ethnic composition ===
As of the 2014 census, the population of the village was 2271. At the 1930 census, the population of the village was 1,819; 1,799 Romanians, 14 Jews (all with Yiddish as native language), 4 Hungarians, 1 German, and 1 Russian. At the time, Holercani was a part of the Plasa Mașcăuți of Orhei County.

Ethnical composition according to the 2014 census:
Ethnic group	Number
Moldovans	2165
Romanians	51
Ukrainians	less than or equal to 5
Russians	less than or equal to 5
Others	50
Total	2271

== Notable people ==
- Vitalie Marinuța
