= Oxentea =

- Village
- Location within Moldova
- Coordinates: 47°22′59″N 29°7′10″E
- Country: Moldova
- District: Dubăsari

Government
  - Mayor: Valeriu Rusu (Independent)

Area
  - Total: 16.10 km^{2} (6.22 sq mi)
- Elevation: 66 m (217 ft)

Population (2014 census)
  - Total: 2,514
- Time zone: UTC+2 (EET)
  - Summer (DST): UTC+3 (EEST)
- Postal code: MD-4578

Oxentea is a village in Dubăsari District, Moldova.
