= Ilie Cătărău =

Romanian political adventurer (1888 – ca. 1955)

Ilie V. Cătărău
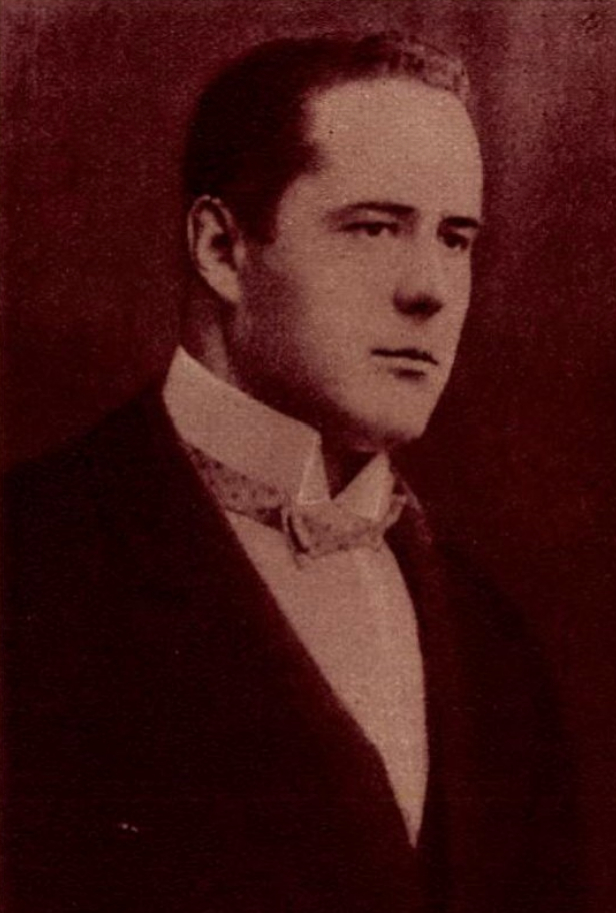
- Cătărău around the time of the Debrecen bombing
- Born: Katarov? 21 July 1888; Marcăuți, Orgeyevsky Uyezd, Bessarabia Governorate, Russian Empire
- Died: c. 1955 (aged ≈67); Transylvania, Romanian People's Republic
- Military career
- Allegiance: Russian Empire; Kingdom of Romania; Moldavian Democratic Republic; Siberian Government
- Branch: Hussars (Imperial Russian Army); Infantry (Romanian Land Forces, MDR army, White Army)
- Service years: before 1910; 1913; 1917–1918
- Rank: Colonel (self-appointed)
- Nicknames: Cătărău-Orhei; Ilarion Cataron
- Commands: 1st Moldavian Regiment
- Conflicts: Second Balkan War; Russian Civil War
- Other work: Espionage, political activity, amateur sports, smuggling, poetry writing

Ilie V. Cătărău (Romanian pronunciation: [iˈli.e kətəˈrəw], reportedly born Katarov, last name also Cătărău-Orhei; 21 July 1888 – c. 1955) was a Bessarabian-born political adventurer, soldier and spy, who spent parts of his life in the Kingdom of Romania. A mysterious figure, he is widely held to have been the main perpetrator of two bomb attacks, which sought to exacerbate tensions between Romania and Austria-Hungary in the buildup to World War I. Beyond his cover as a refugee from the Russian Empire, and his public commitment to Romanian nationalism, Cătărău was a double agent, working for both Russian and Romanian interests; he may also have been linked to the Black Hundreds. His terrorist actions, and especially the letter bomb which he sent to the Hungarian Catholic Bishopric in Debrecen, occurred shortly before, and are probably connected with, the Sarajevo Assassination.

Cătărău managed to flee prosecution, settling in Egypt (which deported him), and later in China. He continued to make return trips to Romania, which finally arrested him upon entering the war—though he managed to escape, he remained on Romanian soil, only leaving on return visits to the Russian Republic. By 1917, as leader of the "Romanian Nationalist-Revolutionary Party", Cătărău was formally committed to anarchism and communism, allying himself with Bessarabia's Bolshevik insurgents. Profiting from favorable circumstances, and nominally serving the anti-Bolshevik Moldavian Democratic Republic, he became commander of its 1st Moldavian Regiment in late 1917. In short time, his position and his application of a communist program eroded the Republic's prestige, and his soldiers began openly threatening the Bessarabian government. Cătărău was deposed and arrested by Military Director Gherman Pântea and a unit of Amur Cossacks, and sent into exile.

Cătărău reportedly became a habitual murderer and robber, playing both sides in the Russian Civil War. Briefly emerging as a drill instructor for the White movement in Vladivostok, he made efforts to settle in the Empire of Japan, but was chased out for engaging in fraudulent business deals. After creating scandal in the Shanghai International Settlement, he spent the early interwar mainly on the French and Italian Rivieras, finding himself at odds with police. After more adventures, which took him as far afield as Polynesia, Cătărău was presumed dead; in 1937, Romanian media circulated a farewell letter he had sent from San Francisco. During World War II, he was reportedly in Transnistria Governorate, having been chased into hiding by Governor Pântea. He only returned to history in the 1940s, a conjectural ally of the Soviet Union and the Romanian communist regime. He became critical of the latter, and was once arrested by its secret police (the Securitate). In old age, he retreated from political affairs and became a Romanian Orthodox monk, serving a community in Transylvania.

== Early years ==
Cătărău's origins and early life are shrouded in mystery. Though credited in some biographical records as a native of Orhei (Orgeyev), he was in fact from the nearby village of Marcăuți; both places were at the time Russia's Bessarabia Governorate (Orgeyevsky Uyezd). His birth certificate is presumed lost, but a sworn testimony he provided in 1948 gives his birth date as 21 July 1888, naming his parents as Vasile and Alexandra. His father, whom he described as either a nobleman or a landless peasant, is sometimes credited as "Vasile Constantin". Ilie himself is credired in some records with the Russian patronymic, rendered in Romanian as "Ilie Vasilievici". According to the Bessarabian activist Anton Crihan, Ilie had a brother, Vasile, who in 1905 was working at the Romanian consulate in Odessa; by other accounts, he also had two sisters, who lived in the same city.

Romanian sources traditionally claim that Cătărău was not a member of the ethnic Romanian community, but rather a Bessarabian Bulgarian. Author N. Porsenna, who met him when they were both in their twenties, contrarily surmises that Cătărău stood as "a fine example of the Romanian race—for he was indeed unquestionably Romanian, and not a Moskal"; he refers to Cătărău's imposing stature of almost 2 meters (6.5 feet) and athletic build. Porsenna also notes that Cătărău was strongly acculturated into the "Russian spirit", being "one-third of a decent man, one-third of a nihilist, and the remaining third a prankster." Cătărău and his sisters were orphaned at an early age. He was sent to Russian Orthodox schools in Ananiv and Odessa, and attended for a while the Bessarabian Seminary. Unable to complete his education there, he was instead enlisted by the Imperial Russian Army and served in the Hussar regiment of Warsaw. He sometimes introduced himself as a Russian officer, who had left service due to persecution. Later accounts suggest that he was merely a cavalry soldier. A polyglot and visibly cultured man, he once claimed to have still been studying theology at a Russian college.

In his final period in Russia's service, Cătărău was recorded at the 1st Cavalry Regiment in Grodno. He used a sword to injure one of his direct superiors and subsequently went into hiding. Parallel accounts have it that he had pledged himself to the "revolutionary movement", or that he was being pursued for fraud. At some point before 18 March 1910, he crossed the Russian border into the Kingdom of Romania, at Dorohoi, after swimming the Prut River at night. He was promptly arrested by the Gendarmes, but philanthropist Gheorghe Burghele vouched for him and took him into his house, giving him his first lessons in standardized Romanian. Writer Ion Călugăru recounts that Cătărău lived in Dorohoi as Burghele's servant, spending his free time terrorizing high school students and courting maids, before he finally "disappeared" from town. After short stays in Botoșani and Iași, he enlisted at the University of Bucharest Faculty of Letters and Philosophy, majoring in History. He had received a Romanian refugee scholarship, for which he qualified after claiming to have suffered repression at the hands of Russian authorities. His dossier included forged papers that claimed he had studied at Odessa University.

According to a 1946 article by Emil Dorian, Cătărău was a zealous student. After obtaining his visa, he became involved with the cell of Bessarabian exiles, including anarchist Zamfir Arbore and his Milcovul Society. His marginal role in politics concerned the Siguranța Statului secret police, who opened a special file on his activities. By the early 1910s, Cătărău was indeed working for the Russian Okhrana spy ring. He benefited from the disorganization of Romanian intelligence services, who were still in the process of establishing themselves. He registered and was paid monthly as a Romanian Land Forces counterintelligence operative in 1913. According to Porsenna, his friends, who took into consideration his unusual largess, always suspected that he was a Romanian spy—and also believed that he was a male prostitute; lawyer-adventurer Ioan Timuș reports that there was another stated source of income, since Cătărău also organized fundraising efforts for stirring up an anti-Russian revolt in Bessarabia. Cătărău made no secret of his being protected by the Siguranța, and intimated that he could impose himself on other Bessarabian exiles, to the point of raping a female colleague who had rejected his advances. By 1913, he had made a name for himself denouncing alleged Russian spies, including Ion Costin. In retrospect, this appears to have been a disinformation campaign ordered by Cătărău's Russian contacts.

Officially, Cătărău paid allegiance to the Romanian nationalist youth. As later noted by the Arad newspaper Românul: "At first he passed himself off as a Bessarabian student and issued lively propaganda, in student circles, regarding the sufferings of Bessarabian Romanians. It was therefore easy for him to attract everyone's sympathy. He turned himself into a nationalist and was always present at nationalist rallies." Cătărău, who was best friends with the actor and activist Petre Liciu, infiltrated the Democratic Nationalist Party (PND) of Nicolae Iorga and A. C. Cuza. He participated in the PND congress for Ilfov County, declaring that "us Bassarabian Romanians can only trust the nationalist-democratic party". During the March 1911 election, Cătărău campaigned for the PND's Cuza and Ion Zelea Codreanu in Fălticeni. With his impressive size, he is said to have intimidated potential voters, and to have willingly provoked a brawl. A year later, acting on behalf of the Bessarabian Romanian Cultural Organization, he began a public correspondence with the Russian linguist Nikolai Nikolayevich Durnovo, who had advocated for Romanian nationality rights. Such episodes earned Cătărău the trust of his party colleagues. Through Iorga, he even gained access to Crown Prince Carol.

== Tâmpa and Debrecen attacks ==
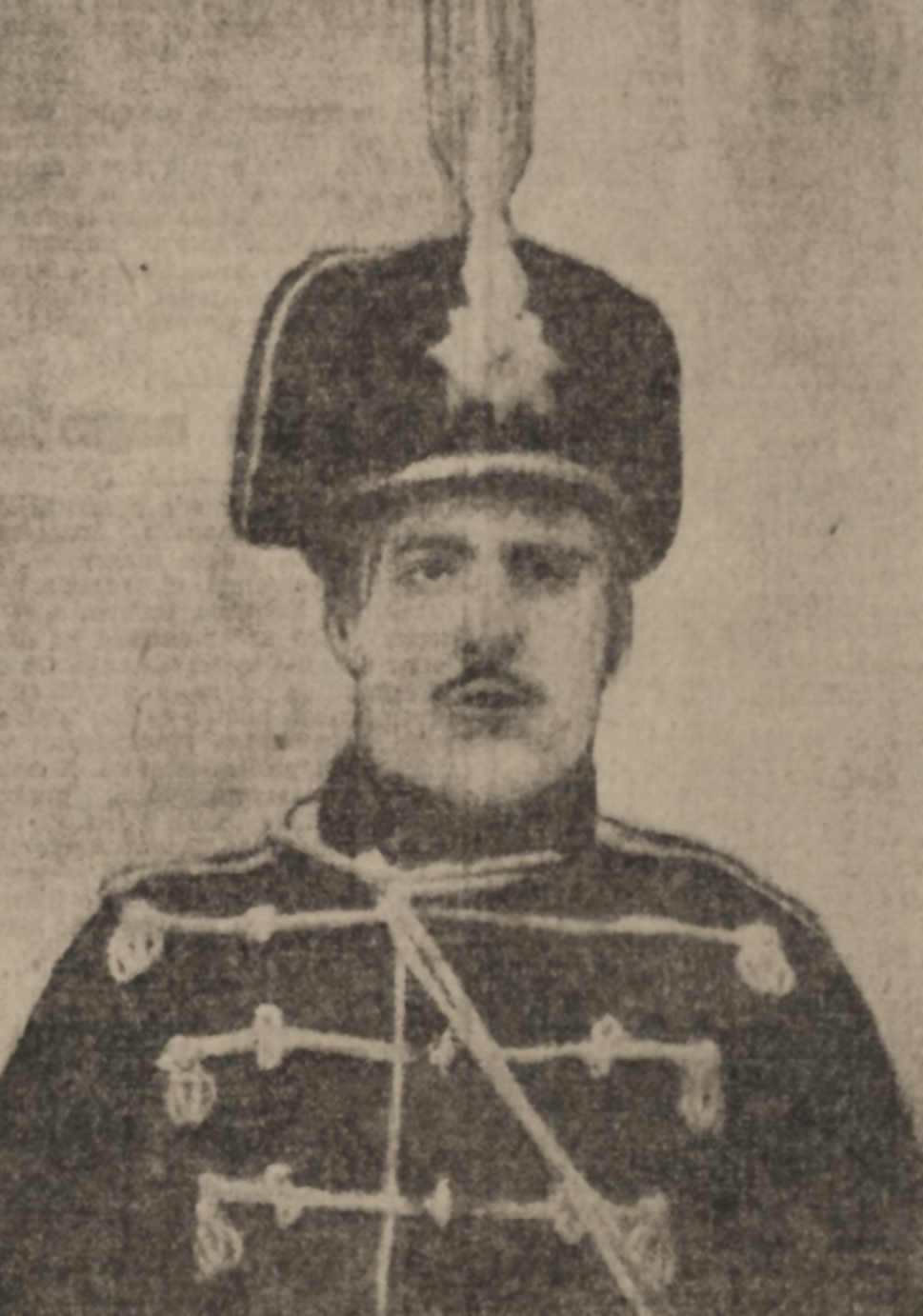
Cătărău in his Russian Hussar uniform

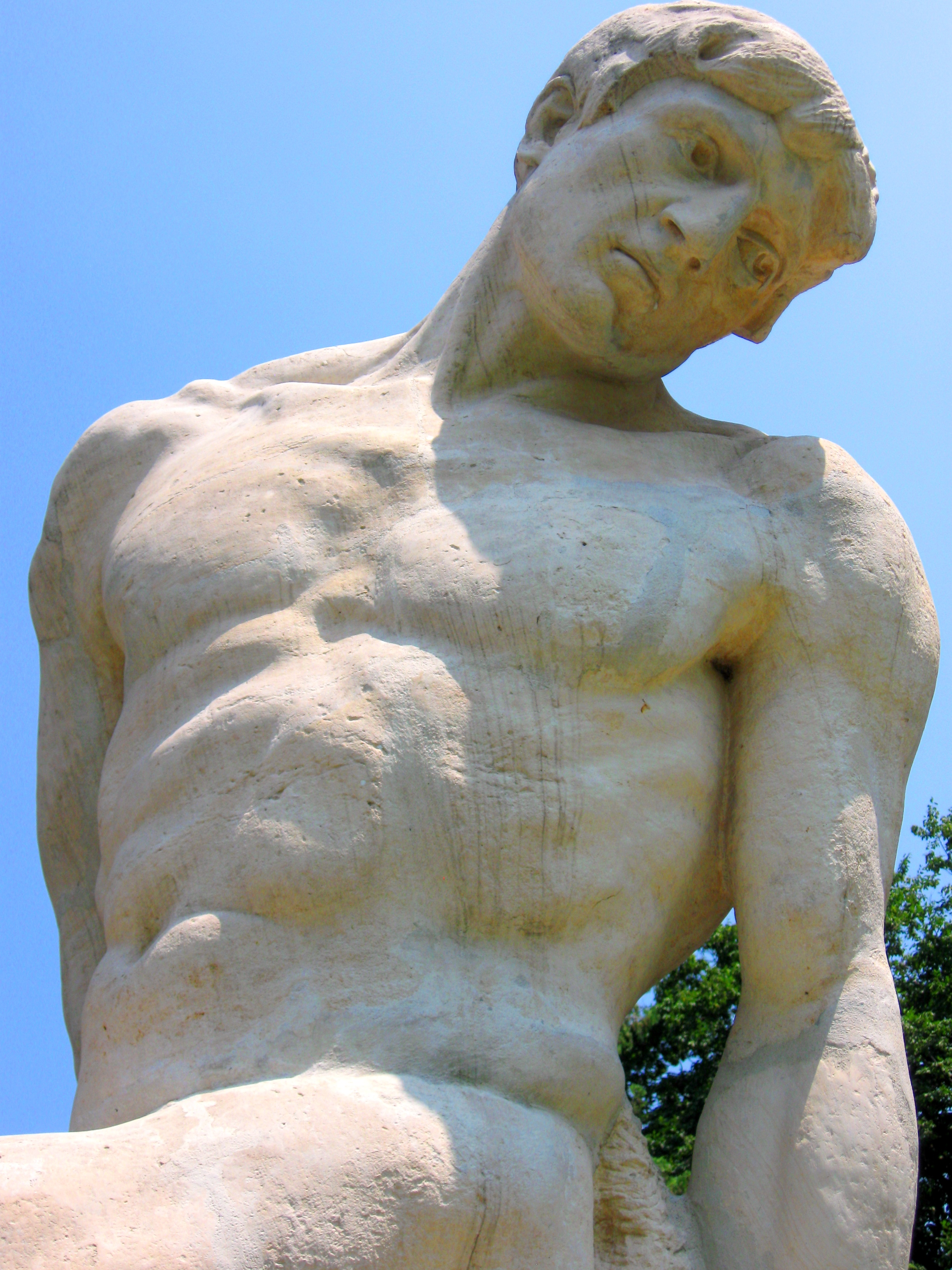
Frederic Storck's "Giant", supposedly modeled on Cătărău or Kiriloff

Cătărău obtained his wages from a variety of unorthodox sources. He claimed to have single-handedly put together the heating system at Luvru Hotel. During his first summer vacation, he was a dockworker in the Port of Constanța, returning in autumn to find employment at Bucharest's needlemaking factory (where he injured his fingers). He was also adored by the public as an amateur wrestler at the Sidoli Circus, imitating gladiatorial scenes from the novel Quo Vadis—as both Timuș and Porsenna claim, his billed appearance as a bullfighter was a publicity stunt, never actually taking place. Though Sidoli ended his contract and left him in a difficult position, Cătărău also translated for Russian trading posts, and was an extra at the National Theater Bucharest. In one instance, when Cătărău allegedly turned to manual labor, Iorga and the students popularized his plight and collected funds in his name. Porsenna doubts whether he was ever an actual laborer, noting that he may have lied for attention. His naturalization was delayed for several years, reportedly because the Conservative ministers would not hear of it. In a statement for the opposition paper Viitorul, Cătărău noted that several Jews had been naturalized while he, a Romanian, remained stateless. He eventually obtained his citizenship, and traveled with a Romanian passport. He is thus known to have visited Serbia during the First Balkan War, officially acting as a press correspondent for the Romanian newspaper Epoca. When Romania entered the Second Balkan War, Cătărău joined the Land Forces as a volunteer rifleman in mid-1913. He also spent some time translating from Russian to the Romanian General Staff.

Upon his return to Bucharest, Cătărău underwent a change of lifestyle—elegant clothes, heavy gambling, fancy escorts—all of which fueled speculations about Russian payments. He began associating with Timofei Kiriloff, who was either a Russian or Bulgarian expatriate. One reconstructed biographical sketch of Kiriloff presents him as an escapee from the Potemkin mutiny, who supported himself in Bucharest by posing for painters and sculptors. His athletic body is supposedly the model for Frederic Storck's statue of a giant, now in Carol Park; though some records suggest that Cătărău himself was the inspiration for that sculpture, and possibly for most statues scattered in that park. The two men probably met each other while Kiriloff was trying to set up a business in haulage. Cătărău also kept company with Kiriloff's lover, Vasilichia Coprian, and with another member of the circle, tailor Vasia Dimitriev. He won the latter's loyalty and affection by chasing a group of tax collectors from his house.

Cătărău and Kiriloff were suspected of attacking symbols of Hungarian identity, Austria-Hungary being Romania's rival neighbor. The two are credited as responsible for dynamiting the Árpád statue, a Hungarian monument on Tâmpa Hill, which heavily damaged the structure in September 1913. They were assisted in this effort by some local Romanian nationalists. In a 1941 interview, one of these men was holding on to the belief that Cătărău had been a traveling salesman, and that he was guided in his political action by his "warm Romanian heart"—namely, that he wanted to protest for Romanian ethnic rights in Transylvania. An investigation found that Cătărău and his accomplice had crossed into Transylvania several times using false papers, while telling friends that they were carrying out "great plans" in Serbia. He had told his Romanian contacts that the Okhrana had actively sought to prevent him from reaching Transylvania, and that he had escaped arrest by its agents by going into hiding—first at Bender, then in the Danube Delta—before heading back into Austria-Hungary, by way of Bucharest and Temesvár. In order to achieve their goal, he and Kiriloff dressed up as Romanian peasants and then as chimney sweeps; by the time of the explosion, they had left the area, and were hiding out at an isolated hut in the Ciucaș Mountains. After it emerged that Árpád's severed head had landed in an amusement park, or "house of illusions," a liberal Hungarian newspaper covered this turn of events as reflecting the status of Hungarian nationalism in Romanian-inhabited Transylvania.

In February 1914, authorities in several countries identified Cătărău and Kiriloff as responsible for a letter bomb attack on the Hajdúdorog Bishopric palace in Debrecen. The selection of this target was later explained in ethnic terms, since the Bishopric served to Magyarize the population of Partium. They managed to kill six people (including a vicar, a secretary, a valet, and the valet's wife), with Bishop István Miklósy escaping unharmed. The standard account is that Cătărău had personally traveled to Bukovina's main city, Czernowitz, and sent the bomb across Austria-Hungary. Other reports claim that he traveled to Hungary-proper (using the fake name "Avramescu"), and that he then mailed his package through Magyar Posta. The accompanying letter was composed in ungrammatical Hungarian by an unnamed Transylvanian Romanian, who was also Cătărău's love interest—as she confessed in a 1935 memoir.

The subsequent inquiry was generally backed by the Transylvanian Romanian press, which made efforts to distinguish between Romanian political efforts and Cătărău's acts of destruction. Gazeta Transilvaniei called him "a political adventurer" of uncertain loyalties and qualifications. In Bukovina, which was in the non-Hungarian, "Cisleithanian", half of the Austro-Hungarian monarchy, Romanian community leaders also described the "criminal act" as intolerable, condemning foreign attempts to exacerbate ethnic tensions in Transylvania. Cătărău was similarly marginalized by an association of Bucharest University students, who noted: "the public trial is concluded: an adventurer, lacking even the shade of moral discipline, has taken on by accident, and for a short while, the image of a university student". The international press (Arbeiter-Zeitung, Breslauer Zeitung, Journal des Débats, Leipziger Neueste Nachrichten) covered the attack and its consequences, highlighting the risky and divisive ethnic politics of Hungarian administrations; in Hungarian newspapers, the focus was on Romanian agitation or ingratitude.

== Manhunt and cover-up allegations ==
A manhunt followed these attacks: Cătărău was identified as a suspect for his lavish spending of money, despite being officially unemployed; Romanian Police identified the manufacturer of a seal, which Cătărău had used to stamp his letter, as well as the person who had sold him a panther's pelt, which had been used in wrapping the bomb. Austrian authorities offered 300,000 kronen for his capture. Porsenna claims to have met him on Calea Victoriei, Bucharest, already in a concealing disguise: "blonde wig, yellow mustache and eyebrows, monocle, an extremely elegant suit (apparently, the bombing had paid well)! He walked about with a hunch and pretended not to recognize me; but when I grabbed him by the arm, he did not protest: he only cupped his hand over his revolver". Beyond his new attire and gait, Cătărău made little effort to conceal himself, informing Porsenna that the Romanian state had no real interest in apprehending him; he also claimed to have obtained Swiss citizenship, which granted him additional protection.

According to one report, local detectives worked together with Hungarian authorities, but the Romanian press unwittingly informed Cătărău and Kiriloff of the chase, letting them escape. Romanian journalist Em C. Grigoraș, reporting the claims of unnamed sources among the Siguranța staff, suggests that Cătărău's getaway car was provided by Internal Affairs, and that intelligence officials had pretended not to understand the queries sent in from Austria-Hungary. Over 10,000 lei were said to have been spent on telegrams between police stations during the time it took for Cătărău and Kiriloff to drive out of Bucharest and make themselves lost in Ploiești. Some speculated that they then left for a Danube port, either Brăila or Galați, or that they made their way to the Bessarabian border. Meanwhile, police released the initial working suspects, including Romanian artist Silvestru Măndășescu and Russian migrant worker T. Avramov (also known as "Măndărăchescu and Avram"), whose identity papers were allegedly used by Cătărău and Kiriloff to fend off suspicions. The fugitives were being pursued in several states and there were reports of their having been spotted in Naples, in Skopje, or at Herceg Novi. The Skopje sighting proved to be a hoax, pulled on Hungarian detectives by a Serbian police officer, who had collected the large reward and had swiftly disappeared.

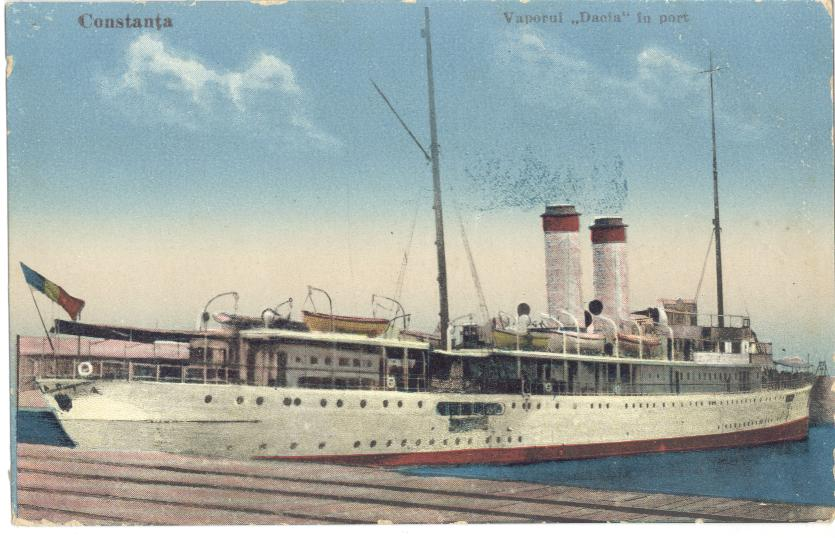
The SS Dacia, on which Cătărău escaped the manhunt

Coprian allegedly informed other accomplices that Cătărău and Kiriloff had sailed out of Constanța at night, disguised as part of a regular crew; the ship captain objected to their presence, and wanted them "thrown into the sea" at Istanbul, but the other sailors stood by the escapees, and they continued their journey unharmed. This information was partly leaked to the press in 1914, with some newspapers claiming that he had died on a shipwreck in the Black Sea. There were additional news that Cătărău had been briefly retained in the Ottoman Empire but released when the Ottomans noted that he did not fit the extradition criteria. One investigation, carried in 1918 by journalist L. Iliescu, found that Cătărău had been taken to Alexandria in Egypt on the NMS Regele Carol, and was under the personal protection of Commodore Stoianovici. The local Romanian consulate refused to welcome him there, but covered most of his expenses in return for an affidavit, which included details on his being a Siguranța operative; the latter institution had reportedly obtained him a Bulgarian passport. Cătărău spent some time in Egypt, but its government reportedly expelled him, citing to his reputation as a spy "for two opposing countries." According to Iliescu's report, he managed to find refuge on another Romanian ship, the SS Dacia, which agreed to sail him out of Egypt, dropping him off in Ottoman Syria. Years later, skippers Eugeniu Botez and Nicolae Ionescu-Johnson noted with pride that they had helped Cătărău flee aboard that ship.

Despite having a Romanian network to assist him, Cătărău was still working for Russian interests. Beyond his involvement with Okhrana, he was possibly affiliated with the far-right of Russian nationalism. Allegations surfaced that he was a sworn member of the Black Hundreds or the Chamber of the Archangel Michael, both private militias created by Bessarabian landowner Vladimir Purishkevich. Zamfir Arbore backed this account, and recalled visiting Cătărău in Bucharest with Universul newspaper reporter Stelian Popescu; at the time, much was made of Cătărău's possible connection with nationalist leader Aleksei Aleksandrovich Bobrinsky. A rumor had it that the Russian diplomats made efforts to obscure the relationship, whereas Arbore openly alleged having seen proof of Bobrinsky's connection in Cătărău's apartment. In her 1935 memoir, the unidentified female accomplice reports that a man from the Black Hundreds had personally arranged Cătărău and Kiriloff's escape from Bucharest, and that a "great power" protected them as they sailed out of Romania. Another suspected Russian contact, cited by Romanian sources, was allegedly a Dolgorukov prince.

Russian diplomats rejected claims that their country had been involved, and alleged instead that Romania had paid for Cătărău's safe withdrawal, suggesting that he was in Argentina. Grigoraș sees the matter as a local spy game between the Entente Powers (Russia included) and the Central Powers (or, more specifically, Austria-Hungary). In his account, Cătărău and his associates were trying to wreck Romania's few remaining links with the Central Powers, and make the country a part of Entente projects in any coming war. Other sections of the Romanian public opinion were less adamant that Cătărău and Kiriloff were the guilty parties, placing the blame directly on the Russian Empire (accused of wanting to encourage a conflict between Romanians and Hungarians) or, contrarily, on Transylvanian Rusyns incited by Bobrinsky. The Austro-Hungarian Ambassador to Bucharest, Count Ottokar von Czernin, remained skeptical of all Romanian disclaimers. In his memoirs he alleged that whether Cătărău was guilty or not, "the Romanian authorities certainly were". This was partly confirmed by Iliescu, who notes that Romanian Prime Minister Ion I. C. Brătianu ordered his subordinates not to inform Czernin about Cătărău's presence in Alexandria. Grigoraș claims that it was Czernin himself who buried the affair: Archduke Franz Ferdinand ordered his diplomat not to answer in kind to the warmongers. Grigoraș argues that, because of this disengagement, the Entente's hawks changed their tactic and organized Franz Ferdinand's own assassination at Sarajevo.

== Pângărați and the "Nationalist-Revolutionary Party" ==
Shortly after the Archduke's killing, World War I broke out. During its early stages, Cătărău returned incognito to visit Bucharest and contact his sponsors. Russian records claim that he was asked to leave, and allowed to settle for a while in the Kingdom of Italy. In 1914, he was at Fremantle in Western Australia, writing Romanian poems about his longing for home. His own account, as retold by Timuș, clarified that, after being barred from returning to Egypt, he purposefully settled into a "tiny village" in China, managing to confound his Hungarian pursuers. By 1916, he had become something of a legend in the criminal underworld of Transylvania. A man interrogated on burglary charges claimed to be the Bessarabian bomber in an effort to gain notoriety. With his unexpected returns to still-neutral Romania, he made himself an official nuisance. He was again arrested by the Romanian authorities and secretly detained in Pângărați. He spent his time there performing scientific experiments on small animals, as well as acts of charity for the rural community. In late 1916, Romania joined the Entente, waging war on Austria-Hungary. Cătărău again applied to join the Romanian Land Forces but was denied. Instead, the authorities negotiated with Russia to accept him, hoping that he would be sent to the Caucasian front.

During the Romanian debacle of 1916–1917, Cătărău escaped his place of detention and wandered around Neamț County. In November 1916, he was at Iași, the Romanian provisional capital, where he happened to meet Porsenna, who was serving in the artillery. According to the latter, Cătărău, who was "very well dressed", "probably had other missions to fulfill [...]. He told me that he was very saddened by Romania's defeat, and asked that I hand him the revolver I carried on my belt, wishing to commit suicide... I advised him to hurl himself into the Râpa Galbenă [gully], which carried the same chance of success. To my knowledge, he never did." The fugitive was eventually recaptured by the Romanian authorities, and moved to a new detention site, at Durău Monastery, where he was held under an alias. He was still there when the February Revolution broke out in Russia and witnessed the consequences of this event on Romanian morale. He escaped custody and again made his way to Iași, and was also spotted at Bârlad. Cătărău himself claimed to have moved deep into Russian territory (possibly to Moscow), as a direct participant in the revolutionary struggles. He reported having been injured in his arm by a stray bullet, and also having been propelled by the protesting crowds into a jewelry shop, which allowed him to steal a "fistful of gemstones."

At Iași, Cătărău kept company with other Bessarabian refugees, among them Okhrana informant Alexis Nour. By April 1917, Cătărău had come into contact with the leftist Labor Party, founded by George Diamandy, Nicolae L. Lupu, and Grigore Trancu-Iași. He then left for Bessarabia, where, as a nominal Labor Party representative, he contacted the autonomist National Moldavian Party (PNM). The PNM registered Cătărău's mission as an oddity, and refused to deal with the Romanian leftists. Cătărău returned to Romania as a radical competitor of Laborite politics, and founded his own republican-dictatorial group, the "Romanian Nationalist-Revolutionary Party" (PNRR, also known as the "Group of Romanian Nationalist Revolutionaries"). It had a self-contradictory program, celebrating the glories of "Greater Romania" and "Free Russia".

This political enterprise counted among its recruits the Bessarabian Simeon G. Murafa, who also brought in Romulus Cioflec as a Transylvanian contact. In his published memoirs, Cioflec provides detail on Cătărău's designs for a revolution in Romania-proper; when asked about whether anyone was helping him from across the Romanian border, Cătărău supposedly hinted that he expected support from Octavian Goga, the nationalist poet. Porsenna, who read one of his manifestos, noted that it urged Romanians to "revolt and join their Russian brethren in an uprising for the sake of liberty". More in detail, the PNRR promised universal suffrage, wealth redistribution, immediate land reform, and application of the homestead principle in agriculture, as well as alluding to a "second point" of policy, which remained unpublished.

Revolution had sent the Russian Empire into administrative chaos, amplifying tensions between the Russian Provisional Government and the Romanian state. As noted by historian Ion Constantin, the returning activist formalized his Okhrana connection. However, the Russian Republic considered Cătărău a Romanian separatist, and arrested him as such. He was sent to the stockade in Chișinău, where he met and closely befriended communist Grigory Kotovsky. Romania's relationship with Russia grew entirely hostile with the October Revolution. Cătărău switched his allegiance to Soviet Russia and reemerged as a figure in the Bessarabian Bolshevik underground, and took part in the clandestine effort to Bolshevize the various troops still stationed in the region. He was probably in contact with the Soviet state security agency, Cheka, but was later portrayed by Russian and Soviet sources as a Romanian mole.

== Chișinău soldiers' soviet ==
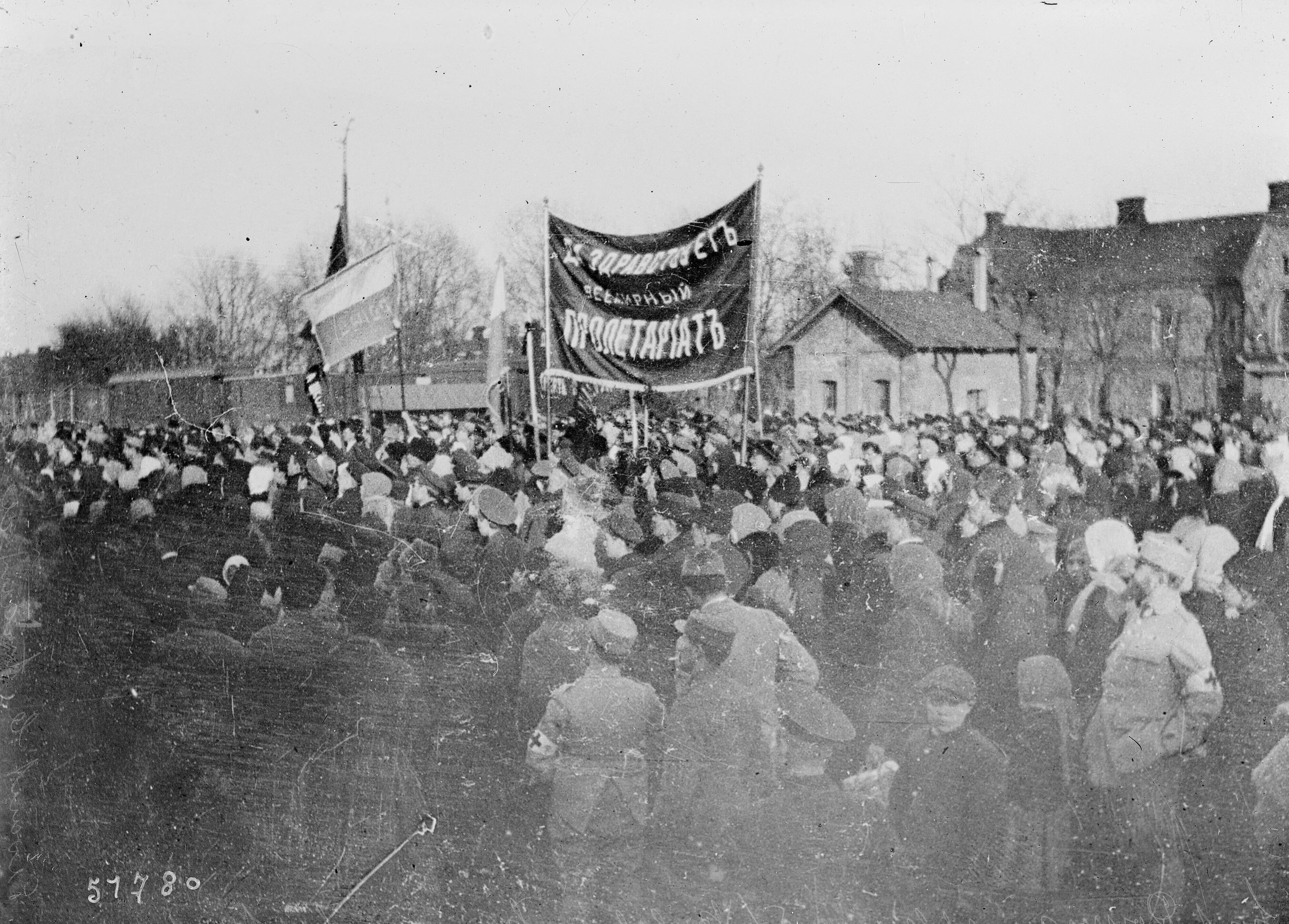
Bolshevik rally in or near Romania, during the 1917 revolutionary period

In late 1917, anti-Bolshevik forces were setting up a Moldavian Democratic Republic with its capital in Chișinău. Cătărău presented himself as a supporter of the new regime, and was even a guest speaker at the first session of Sfatul Țării (its legislative assembly). Reportedly, in his bid to join the new Bessarabian army, Cătărău failed to convince the officers, but the lower ranks responded positively to his request of "aiding and enlightening" the masses. As the army organizer, Anton Crihan sounded the alarm, claiming that Cătărău's very presence was a clue that the troops were being "Bolshevized" from within. He had reportedly endeared himself to his fellow soldiers by volunteering to perform the most mundane or exhausting tasks. According to scholar Charles Upson Clark, Cătărău was actually successful at demoralizing and dividing the Bessarabian self-defense forces, increasing the likelihood that the state would crumble and exposing it to the danger of being engulfed by a Greater Ukraine. Military historian Vitalie Ciobanu argues that some of the Republic's main problems of maintaining authority stemmed from Cătărău's activity in Chișinău and from the parallel appointment of Stabskapitän Anatol Popa as head of the Bălți garrison.

Cătărău is reported to have engaged in intrigues during the legislative election of 1917: he initially proposed Vladimir Cristi as a soldiers' deputy, and managed to obtain him a seat, but immediately after informed his loyalists that Cristi was a "boyar", and therefore that Sfatul itself was a tool of the oligarchy. After being admitted into the garrison, Cătărău had become known for propagating communist- and anarchist-inspired messages, such as: "All things belong to the people, the boyars must be killed"; "All things are yours, take hold of them while you still can, before it's too late." Profiting from the breakdown of traditional rank structure and receiving backing from the military soviet, he was voted head of the Moldavian 1st Regiment, garrisoned in Chișinău. Ciobanu, who describes Cătărău as "an overt partisan of anarchy", notes that, for the Chișinău committees which endorsed this appointment, "the social element took precedence over the national one".

With such support, and given a free hand to ensure order in the capital city, the new commander embarked on a program of rural expropriation, targeting the property of affluent peasants. The stolen cattle were kept in Chișinău's seminary compound, and, in reality, only redistributed to those who would pay Cătărău a special sum of money. There were other corruption schemes of which the regiment stood accused: Cătărău took over the guarding of landowner estates, in what was originally a move to curb pillaging by deserting or home-bound Russian soldiers, but ultimately put financial pressure on the landowners. Petru Cazacu, the Moldavian Prime Minister, recalls seeing Cătărău at Chișinău's Jockey Club, on a mission "to verify those in attendance, to hunt down the bourgeois." In this context, he is also said to have advanced himself to the rank of colonel. In a staged event, he had the rank insignia sewn on his uniform, only to tear it off, demonstratively, in front of his soldiers—to underscore that he viewed himself as their equal.

As later noted by Patria, the Transylvanian daily, Cătărău was becoming "a sort of dictator who terrified the city". In conflict with Sfatul Țării, he began preparations for an insurgency: he agitated for a social revolution, set up an armed guard for himself, and began corresponding with Kotovsky, who was the self-appointed Bolshevik leader in Tiraspol, while setting up a reserve arms' depot in Dubăsari town. His insubordination to the government and his radical views on property were made explicit when he refused to help out against the deserters attacking Soroca. Replying to the appeal for help, Cătărău wrote: "the Moldavian Democracy, in the name of the soldiers of the Moldavian Regiment, understands that the way to stop the anarchy which has arisen in agrarian matters, is not to use military force, but to [legislate against] the causes which give rise to fire and devastation". Nevertheless, when similar events in Chișinău led the Republic to proclaim a state of emergency in December, one of the regimental battalions patrolled the city streets alongside loyalist units.

The conflict between the Moldavian Republic's Military Director Gherman Pântea and the city garrison flared in late December 1917. Cătărău and his soldiers refused to swear allegiance to God and the Republic and participate in a loyalist parade. Instead they announced their own parade on 1 January to celebrate the notions of freedom and proletarian internationalism. A quarter of Cătărău's soldiers disobeyed his orders and represented the Regiment in the loyalist parade. The rest of the garrison grew worried that the Military Directors would retaliate by arresting their leader. On 27 December, Cătărău's soldiers made a show of force inside a government building and allegedly threatened to blow up Sfatul Țării Palace. Pântea and the others persuaded them to leave, but afterward centered their attention on an urgent plan to topple and arrest Cătărău. Seeking approval from the Bolsheviks, Cătărău formed a new soviet, "of the peasants". Its leadership also included Filip Levenzon (Levinsohn), a Russian Army deserter. He also published a letter of affiliation to Russian and Ukrainian Bolshevism, condemning Romanian nationalism as the cause of "great landowners and capitalists". Unbeknown to Cătărău, the Soviet and Rumcherod authorities were also preparing a coup against him: the Chișinău garrison was to be assigned to a more controllable figure.

== Moldavian arrest and deportation ==
With the approval of Bessarabian President Ion Inculeț, Pântea took a preemptive measure. He co-opted Filip Levenzon, informing him about the improbability of Cătărău's schemes. The plotters arrested Cătărău on New Year's Eve, before the garrison could have its own parade. Pântea noted the possibility of discontent and even rebellion in the Moldavian ranks, so he appealed to outside help and enlisted a unit of Amur Cossacks for logistical support and potential intervention in case of trouble. As noted by Călugăru: "The Bessarabians had to invest a lot of effort into isolating this dangerous figure from his lieutenants, so that they could then neutralize him." The Director and his Cossack ally Colonel Yermolenko, with Levenzon, visited Cătărău at Londra Hotel, where Levenzon approached him on the subject of his parade; when Cătărău dropped his guard, the Cossacks pounced on him, and, although some were wounded in a skirmish with communist soldiers, managed to escort him out of the building. Crihan provides a diverging account, namely that Levenzon only supported the move because he and Cătărău were fighting over the same woman. The latter was "bought off" into getting Cătărău drunk, accounting for his successful capture.

The charges against Cătărău were espionage in favor of a foreign state and abuse of power. As far as the Bessarabian authorities cared to explain, the "foreign state" alluded to here was not Russia, but Romania; Levenzon confiscated Cătărău's Romanian passport. Cătărău was never prosecuted, but promptly expelled over the eastern border, to Odessa, Ukrainian People's Republic. According to official statements, his escorts for the swift journey included two former Sfatul Țării delegates, Grigore Turcuman and Ion Tudose. However, as argued by Patria, the Inculeț administration was bent on killing him with discretion. Cătărău, it argued, was able to talk his captors into sparing his life. Pântea also claims that Cătărău protested his patriotism, demanding to be allowed to kiss his native soil one final time. Upon arriving to Odessa, he took a rather different stance. Questioned by Commissioner Poplavko of the Central Rada, he stated: "Bessarabian Moldavians are pushing for Romania; I alone will fight for Bessarabia to become united with the Ukraine." To the consternation of Bessarabian officials, Poplavko was satisfied with that answer, ordering Cătărău's release. Cătărău's account of the events is entirely different. He claimed to have shot down his entire escort before they could kill him, and to have been recaptured in Odessa by Ukrainian soldiers, whom he also executed.

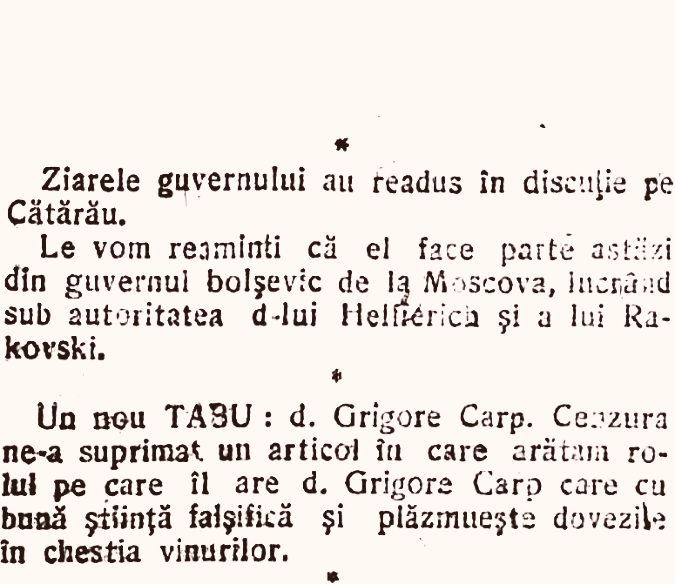
Mișcarea of 27 July 1918, referring to Cătărău as a Bolshevik "under the authority of Mr Hellferich and Rakovski"

Over the following years, many Romanians were convinced that Cătărău had either been summarily executed by the Romanian military or assassinated by his Bolshevik allies. In April 1918, the Hungarian paper Az Est purported that Cătărău had been "shot dead by a Romanian man, out in the open streets of Chișinău. The reasons for this incident are not understood in Bucharest, since Cătărău was the advocate of Romanian interests in Chișinău." In mid-1918, a Progressive Conservative government took power in Romania, and signed a peace with the Central Powers; during that interval of co-operation between Romania and Austria-Hungary, the Parliament of Romania opened an inquiry into the Debrecen case. Cătărău's name was held by the government newspapers as a negative example of what Ententist politics had meant. As a pro-Entente daily, Mișcarea retorted: "Let's remind them that [Cătărău] is by now a member of the Bolshevik government in Moscow, his work carried out under the authority of Mr Hellferich and Rakovski."

In July 1918, Gazeta Bucureștilor published a letter supposedly sent by Cătărău, in which he described himself as a "mere instrument, back when I was carrying out that strike on Debrecen", adding: "In fact, Bolshevik gazettes have been shedding light on [my] crime." The Soviets were at the time publishing embarrassing selections from the Russian Empire's diplomatic correspondence, allegedly including letters that openly discussed the Debrecen affair. Around the time of Bessarabia's union with Romania, Cătărău had actually left Europe. Characterized by Patria as "handsome and intelligent", he had mastered as many as eight languages and, according to one account, sailed to England, then to the Far East, and began trafficking in opium. Others attest his slow crossing of Siberia during the Russian Civil War—reportedly, he carried with him the gemstones he had stolen, baked into a loaf of bread (he privately confessed to murdering the baker), and avoided conflict with either the Reds or the Whites by pretending to support either side, "depending on context." Employed for a while by the Whites' Siberian Government, Cătărău became a drill instructor in Vladivostok.

Records of Cătărău's attempt to settle in the Empire of Japan were provided by Timuș, who chanced upon him in Yokohama at some point in 1918. They bonded because of Timuș's fluency in Japanese; as Timuș reports, Cătărău had a "rather imperfect" grasp of Chinese, which he tried out on his Japanese hosts. Another Romanian travel writer, Radu D. Rosetti, was told that Cătărău, already subsidized by Soviet Russia and trafficking in stolen jewelry, had been seized as he tried to smuggle a precious Buddharupa out of the country, then expelled as a nuisance. Another version places the incident in Japanese-occupied Siberia. According to this source, Cătărău was only freed from Yokohama Prison when a Romanian official intervened in his favor. These accounts are nuanced by Timuș, who was told by Cătărău that the Buddharupa was a forgery of his own making—though it included a precious stone of real value. He had integrated it into a bait-and-switch confidence trick, whose intended victim, a Sino-Japanese antiques dealer, reported him to the Police Affairs Bureau; Japanese counterintelligence already had him under its watch as a potential spy. The resulting scandal came as a bad omen for Japan–Romania relations: "on this first occasion that Japanese people heard the term 'Romanian', they associated it with 'confidence man and spy'." Timuș felt prompted to contact The Japan Times, advising its writers to depict Cătărău as "not a Romanian, but a Bessarabian Russian".

== 1920s escapades ==
During the last months of World War I, Cătărău had been deported from Japan to the Shanghai International Settlement, where he earned back his Romanian nationalist credentials. He narrowly escaped prosecution after severely injuring a Russian national who had mocked the Romanian war effort. Shortly after Armistice Day, he was sighted driving around town, his automobile donned in red-yellow-blue, the Romanian national colors. Copies of his photograph reached Romania, where it was announced that "Cătărău lives". He then sailed to France, and, Timuș recalls reading, was detained upon arrival to Marseille—alleged to have stolen a necklace, which the authorities never recovered. Having also arrived there with a false passport, Cătărău led the life of a delinquent, and may have spent more time in prison. When the Romanian delegation to the Paris Peace Conference was robbed in 1919, Cătărău, known then as "Ilarion Cataron", was indicated as a prime suspect, and investigated as such by the Paris Police Prefecture. As a Bessarabian member of the delegation, Ion Pelivan reports having met Cătărău in that context, rejecting his plea for a return visa to Romania. According to Pelivan, Cătărău resented the rejection, and took his revenge by throwing a chemical grenade into the Pelivans' apartment, nearly injuring his wife.

The conference ensured international recognition for the union of Transylvania with Romania, which established a Transylvanian Hungarian minority within the borders of Greater Romania. In early 1920, Cătărău was jailed in Nice for stealing jewels from his American fiancée, or, according to Porsenna: "while on the French Riviera, after the war, he stole the diamond necklace of some coquettish old lady." His defense at the trial was regarded as scandalous by Viitorul journalists, since he had depicted his adventures in Bessarabia and Japan as Romanian government missions. The Hungarian newspaper Székely Nép reported that Romanians had organized a "fundraiser for his release" as a "national hero", adding: "We cannot possibly know what the Romanian public at large thinks about such a perverse idea. However, we believe that any sane person—whether Romanian or Hungarian—would turn away in disgust from any activity that collects money to support thieves." Sentenced to 18 months in confinement, Cătărău eventually managed to escape France, which declared him a missing fugitive. In 1922, he was at Ospedaletti, in the Kingdom of Italy, where he engaged with a group of Romanian Jewish tourists to complain that he was "dying of hunger", and that Jews never reciprocated his having "done so much for [them]". He was still pursued by the Hungarian Kingdom: as reported in 1924 by its Justice Minister Pál Pesthy, France had refused to extradite him in 1923, citing the "political nature of [his] crime."

Rosetti viewed Cătărău as a "Bolshevist adventurer" and a byproduct "of the awful slaughter" that was World War I. As Cătărău's former sponsor, Nicolae Iorga was perplexed by echoes of his participation in "the Bolshevik resistance". In his 1930s autobiography, he briefly mentions Cătărău as "my bizarre former student and 'political supporter', a combatant in the Fălticeni elections". Other supporters of Greater Romania were also in the process of reconsidering Cătărău's activity, glorifying his early attack on Hungarian nationalism. Writing in April 1920, the Romanian physician and nationalist militant Vasile Bianu placed Cătărău in "the vanguard of the holy war to reunite the [Romanian] nation", calling him "a guiding light" of patriotic feeling. In its Socialismul newspaper, the Romanian Communist Party rejoiced that the Bolsheviks had opened up the archives, since these had exposed the role of Romanian cabinets in fomenting war. In that context, the Romanian communists labeled Cătărău an "adventurer", whose only real function was that of a nationalist pawn. Claims that Cătărău was a communist were also being dismissed in the Soviet Union and its Moldavian ASSR. In early 1924, Christian Rakovsky, the Soviet plenipontiary in London, was building the Soviet case against recognizing Greater Romania. As part of this effort, he described Cătărău as one of "agitators" that Romania had sent into Bessarabia seven years prior. When, in 1935, Naum Nartsov produced a Soviet account of wartime events, he described Cătărău as an "international spy", and identified him as an inspiration behind the Moldavian Democratic Republic, itself condemned as a "bourgeois nationalist" entity.

After 1925, Cătărău was spotted in the Republic of China, a gunrunner for the National Revolutionary Army in its Northern Expedition. He is said to have approached several Romanian expatriates, conning them out of their money. Writing in 1933, Călugăru suggested that Cătărău had last been seen in Japan; a note carried by Dimineața daily in 1935 reported that he was still somewhere on the French Riviera. He was in Mexico around 1927. At Veracruz, he resumed writing poems, or "laments" (Bocete), later published as a book by Vasile Stângaci of São Paulo. For a while, he worked as a whale hunter; he was somewhere in Alaska in 1930. Another story has it that he settled in Polynesia and was even recognized as king by an indigenous tribe.

Cătărău himself did not fully validate all these accounts. He recounted having mainly worked out of San Francisco, where he had taken a chemistry diploma and opened his own business, which produced sterilization equipment. In other contexts, he claimed to have formal training in dermatology. Another story he told was that he had won a libel case against Hearst Communications, upon which he was awarded 40,000 United States dollars in damages. He saved up money and maintained his strength through teetotalism.

== Final Romanian returns ==
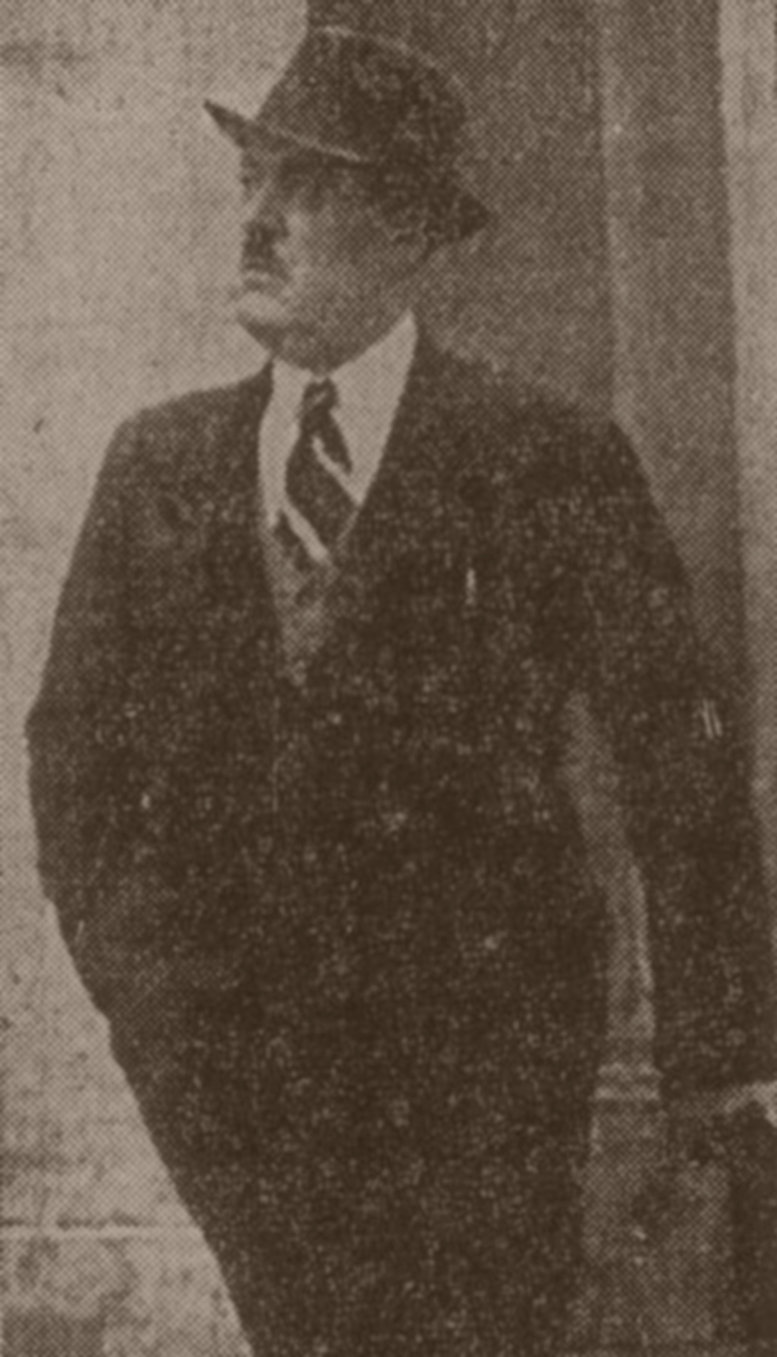
Cătărău on his return trip to Bucharest, March 1939

In April 1937, Universul daily published a telegram that Cătărău had sent from Saint Luke's Hospital in San Francisco, in which he claimed that he was on his deathbed, and asked for a clump of Romanian soil to be scattered on his grave. He also declared his loyalty toward the King of Romania, Carol II, and warned Romanians to prepare for a coming war. His presence in that city was also confirmed by a Romanian emigrant, with a letter cited by Porsenna in May 1937. Porsenna himself doubted that Cătărău was ever truly ailing, suggesting that the message was meant to be read by the Siguranța as an offer to resume collaboration. In its editorial comment on these developments, Universul noted: "In fact, Ilie Cătărău was never officially arrested, and his case has slowly faded off from the shelf of sensational newspaper topics, to where it is now completely forgotten." In February 1939, several Hungarian newspapers reported that a "Victor Vasilescu" had been arrested in Paris, and that he was in reality Cătărău. The Romanian daily Tribuna was skeptical regarding the identification: "We believe that the news in the Hungarian press are within the realm of fantasy, given that Cătărău has been dead for a few years now."

Cătărău had indeed survived his hospitalization, and lived throughout World War II. He was in Romania, incognito, around the time of the Munich Agreement (September 1938), speaking to his friends about his adversity toward Nazi Germany. He also began drawing up plans for assassinating Adolf Hitler in Memel. In March 1939, he was spotted and photographed walking about Bucharest. He was now denying any involvement in the Debrecen bombing, only claiming responsibility for the victimless Tâmpa attack; he intended to open a factory, but found himself pursued by Romanian authorities. He claimed that this was because of his anti-Nazism, at a time when Romania was being influenced by Hitler (other accounts indicate that he was spared extradition by Premier Armand Călinescu, who allowed him to escape).

The former anarchist fled into the Soviet Union, revisiting his surviving relatives in Odessa. At the height of war, Bessarabia was annexed by the Soviets. In June 1941, Romania joined the Axis powers and their invasion of Soviet territory. Bessarabia was retaken, then organized into a Romanian governorate. During these events, the government daily Viața hosted an article describing Cătărău as engaged in the struggle for a "great and strong Romania". For a while, Romanian rule was extended into Transnistria Governorate, which included Odessa; Cătărău's old nemesis, Gherman Pântea, took over as governor. Cătărău was in the city, but went into hiding; he later claimed that Pântea was responsible for various war crimes, including the killing of Cătărău's two sisters. Ilie himself resided for a while in the Moldavian SSR (organized by the Soviet regime in reoccupied Bessarabia) and was referenced in Soviet propaganda as a hero for having fought against union with Romania.

Cătărău left the Soviet province and returned to Romania at some point after 1944, when that country had been occupied by the Soviets—in December 1946, he was attested in Bucharest, plotting his revenge against Pântea (who had gone into hiding). Granting an interview to a local journalist, he claimed to have arrived in not from the Soviet Union, but again from the United States, by way of Argentina. Cătărău now inhabited a "modest dwelling" in Floreasca; in September 1948, he was registered as a refugee in Bucharest, his home address rendered as Brezoianu Street 51. He tried to capitalize on the newly established Romanian communist regime, presenting himself as a hero of the cause, and was used by the government as a denouncer of "reactionary" politicians. Employed by the communist press in Bucharest, he accused Pântea "of acts for the most part invented, in order to determine [Pântea's] arrest by the regime's authorities".

Cătărău additionally claimed a special communist pedigree, passing himself off as a personal friend of Bolshevik theorist Vladimir Lenin. He also boasted that he had known the teachings of Leninism "from early childhood." In tandem, he maintained that he was a disciple of Franklin D. Roosevelt's international humanitarianism, and that J. Edgar Hoover was a personal friend of his. The former anarchist was also friends with Constant Tonegaru, the anticommunist poet, whose father had been his university colleague, and whom he fascinated with his stories of Polynesia. In 1952, when Tonegaru Jr returned from Communist imprisonment to die in Bucharest, Cătărău was present at his funeral ceremony. Another member of Tonegaru's circle, Barbu Cioculescu, informs that Cătărău sent letters to Premier Petru Groza, in which he called for a "democratic governance", until he was arrested by the Securitate; Cioculescu also notes that he became unaware of Cătărău's fate after that moment.

According to other reports, Cătărău experienced religious sentiment as an old man, and subsequently became a monk of the Romanian Orthodox Church. The decision was controversial, and Church authorities had to be persuaded by Groza into accepting Cătărău's retreat to a monastery in Transylvania. In August 1955, he was designated a hieromonk and confessor, in which capacity he paid his respects to the recently deceased bishop, Nicolae Bălan. By one interpretation, Groza wanted to reactivate Cătărău as a Securitate spy, but Cătărău died before this could happen.
