= Ustia, Dubăsari =

Ustia
- Village
- Location in Moldova
- Coordinates: 47°15′N 29°7′E
- Country: Moldova
- District: Dubăsari District

Population (2014 census)
  - Total: 3,343
- Time zone: UTC+2 (EET)
  - Summer (DST): UTC+3 (EEST)

Ustia is a village in Dubăsari District, Moldova.

== Media ==
- Jurnal FM - 98.7 MHz

== Notable people ==
- Ștefan Urâtu
