= Ștefan Urâtu =

Moldovan politician (born 1951)

Ștefan Urâtu OR
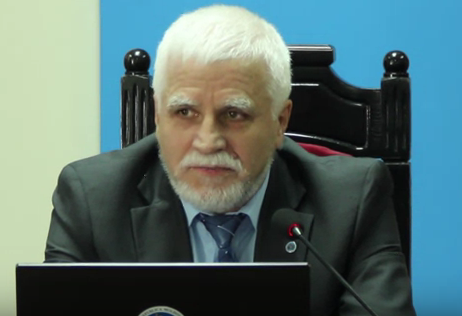
- Urâtu in 2015

Member of the Moldovan Parliament
- In office 16 July 2010 – 28 November 2010
- Preceded by: Mihai Moldovanu
- Parliamentary group: Liberal Party

Personal details
- Born: 9 January 1951 (age 75) Ustia, Moldavian SSR, Soviet Union
- Party: Liberal Party
- Other political affiliations: Alliance for European Integration (2009–2013); Popular Front of Moldova
- Children: 3 daughters
- Awards: Order of the Republic of Moldova

Ștefan Urâtu (born 9 January 1951) is a Moldovan politician.

== Biography ==
Ștefan Urâtu studied at the Veterinary and Zootechnics College from Căușeni, Grigoriopol rayon (1966–1967). He performed compulsory military service in the Soviet army (1969–1972), in Budapest, Hungary. In 1977, he graduated from the department of physics and mathematics of the State Pedagogical Institute in Tiraspol, Moldova. Between 1988 and 1992, Ștefan Urâtu was pro-dean of the department of physics and mathematics of the Tiraspol State University. He has published over 30 scientific articles in the area of the physics of metals and applying radioactive isotopes.

Ștefan Urâtu was a Popular Front of Moldova member of the Republican Council in the Tiraspol section between 1989 and 1992. He was politically detained together with the "Ilașcu Group" between 2 June and 21 August 1992.

In 1990, he founded the first non-governmental association—the Committee for Human Rights from Transnistria in the Tiraspol-based section of the Popular Front. Between 1993 and 2009, he was the chairman of the Helsinki Committee for Human Rights in Moldova (elected in 1993, 1998, 2006).

Ștefan Urâtu was an adviser of Mihai Ghimpu after 12 February 2010. He was a deputy in the Parliament of Moldova in 2010.

He was decorated, by a presidential decree, with Moldova's highest state decoration – the Order of the Republic.

Since 2011, Ștefan Urâtu was Vice-President of the Central Electoral Commission of the Republic of Moldova.

== Awards ==
- The Order of the Republic - Moldova's highest state decoration
