= Anatol Codru =

Moldovan writer and film director

Anatol Codru OR
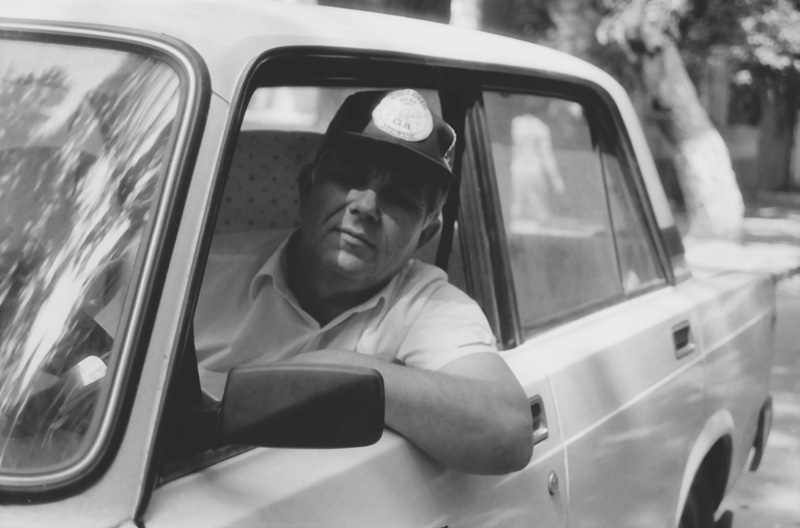
- Codru in 1991
- Born: 1 May 1936; Molovata Nouă, Moldavian ASSR, Ukrainian SSR, Soviet Union
- Died: 17 August 2010 (aged 74); Chişinău, Moldova
- Resting place: Chişinău, Moldova
- Education: Moldova State University
- Known for: Head, Union of Cinematographers of Moldova
- Spouse: Ecaterina Barbu
- Parent(s): Ion Condrea and Titiana Stăncuţă
- Awards: Premiul Uniunii Scriitorilor din Moldova

Anatol Codru (1 May 1936 – 17 August 2010) was a writer and film director from Moldova. He was the head of the Union of Cinematographers of Moldova and a leader of the Democratic Forum of Romanians in Moldova.

== Biography ==
Anatol Codru was born to Ion Condrea and Titiana Stăncuţă on May 1, 1936, in Molovata Nouă. He graduated from Moldova State University in 1963. Since 1998, he has been the head of the Union of Cinematographers of Moldova. Anatol Codru is an honorary member of the Academy of Sciences of Moldova Anatol Codru was suffering from cancer and died in Chişinău on August 17, 2010.

== Awards ==
- Premiul I pentru poezie al prestigioasei reviste literare din Moscova „Drujba narodov", 1976.
- Filmul Mihai Eminescu este distins cu Premiul I la Festivalul de poezie din Suceava, 1992.
- Premiul Uniunii Scriitorilor din Moldova pentru cea mai bună carte de poeme a anului, Intâmplarea mirării, 1999.
- Academia Internaţională de drept economic îi acordă titlul de Doctor Honoris Causa.2000
- Medalia "Mihai Eminescu", Guvernul României

== Books ==
- Nopţi albastre (1962)
- Îndărătnicia pietrei (1967)
- Feciori (1971)
- Portret în piatră (1978)
- Piatra de citire (1980)
- Mitul personal (1986)
- Bolta cuvântului (1997)

== Filmography ==
- Trânta (1968)
- Biografie (1969)
- Alexandru Plămădeală (1969) composer Arkady Luxemburg
- Bahus (1969)
- Arhitectul Sciusev (1970)
- Dimitrie Cantemir (1971)
- Din îndemnul talentului (1971)
- Vasile Alecsandri (1972)
- Carnetul de partid (1973)
- Biografia cântecului (1973)
- Plai reînnoit (1975)
- Neam de pietrari (1975)
- Balada prietenului meu (1978)
- Visul vieţii mele (1980) composer Arkady Luxemburg
- Letopiseţul destinului nostru (1981)
- Puşkin în Moldova (1982)
- Starşinaua Mahail Varfolomei (1983)
- Te salut, nouă generaţie (1983)
- În constelaţia fraternităţii (1984)
- Tălăncuţa (1986)
- Cronica familiei Bologan (1987)
- Sînt acuzaţi martorii (1988)
- Eu, Nicolai Costenco (1989)
- Mihai Eminescu (1992)
- Ion Creangă (1998)

=== Scenarist ===
- Dimitrie Cantemir (1971)
- Ion Creangă (1973)
- Trânta (1977)

=== Text for Symphonic works ===
- Symphonic ballad for voice and orchestra (1984) composer Arkady Luxemburg

=== Lyrics for Songs ===
- Ţară dragă (Dear country) (1975) composer Arkady Luxemburg
- Hora (1976) composer Arkady Luxemburg
- Margarete (1977) composer Arkady Luxemburg

== Bibliography ==
- *** - Literatura şi arta Moldovei: Enciclopedie (Chişinău, 1985–1986)
- Mihail Dolgan - Anatol Codru. Mitul personal (Chişinău, Ed. Literatura artistică, 1986)
