= Marcăuți, Dubăsari =

Marcăuți Маркауць (Ukrainian)
- Village
- Location within Moldova
- Coordinates: 47°21′19″N 29°3′30″E
- Country: Moldova
- District: Dubăsari District

Government
  - Mayor: Alexei Leahu (PLDM)

Area
  - Total: 0.79 km^{2} (0.31 sq mi)
- Elevation: 159 m (522 ft)

Population (2014 census)
  - Total: 516
- Time zone: UTC+2 (EET)
  - Summer (DST): UTC+3 (EEST)
- Postal code: 4575

Marcăuți is a village in Dubăsari District, Moldova.

== Natives ==
- Ilie Cătărău, Bessarabian Romanian spy and adventurer
