= Cremenciug, Căușeni =

Cremenciug
- Village
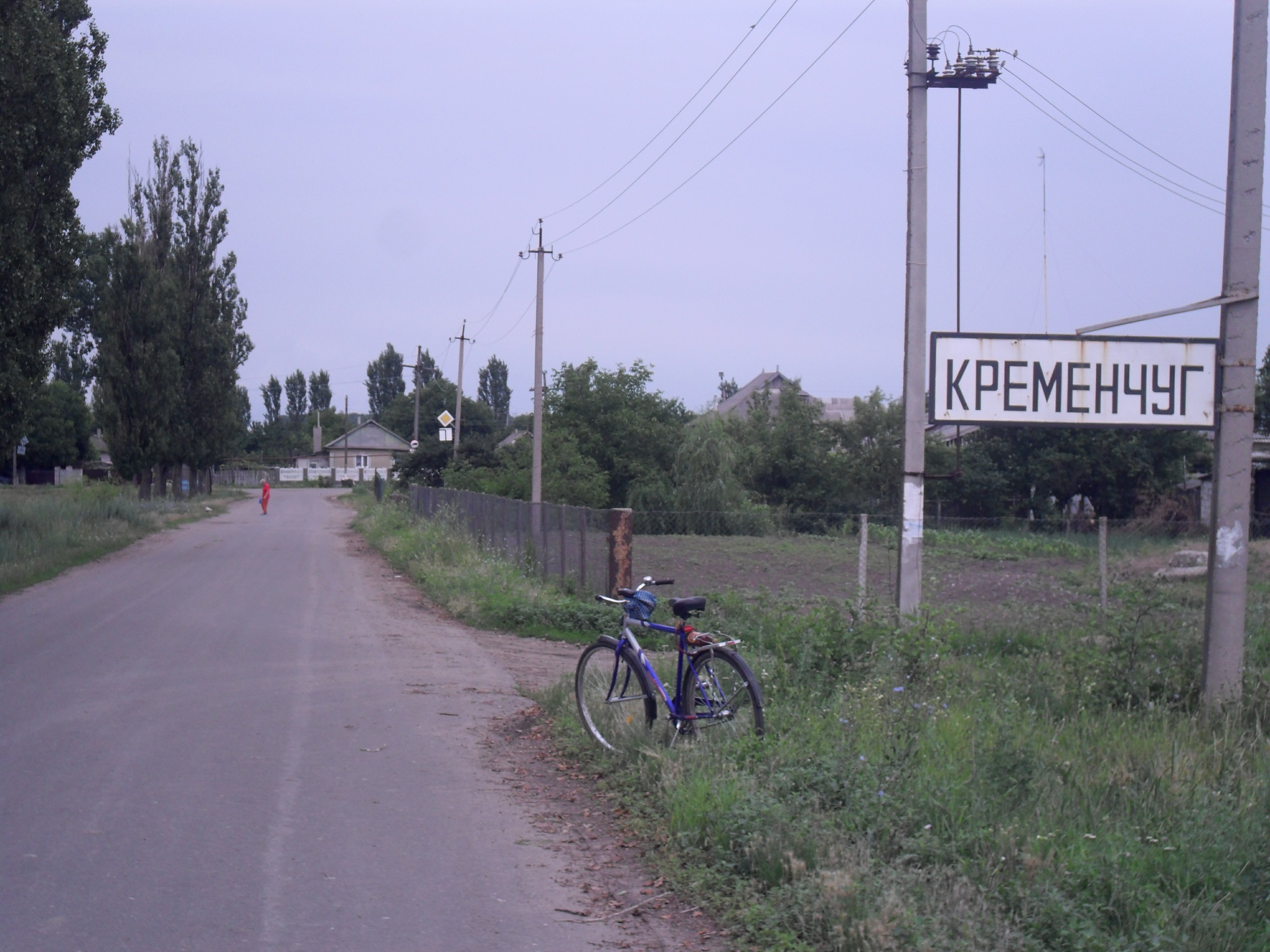
- Road sign in Cremenciug

- Location within Moldova
- Coordinates: 46°42′31″N 29°40′26″E
- Country (de jure): Moldova
- District (de jure): Căușeni
- Country (de facto): Transnistria
- District (de facto): Slobozia

Population (2004)
  - Total: 1,094
- Time zone: UTC+2 (EET)
  - Summer (DST): UTC+3 (EEST)

Cremenciug (Moldovan Cyrillic, Russian, and Ukrainian: Кременчуг, romanized: Kremenchug) is a village in Căușeni District, Moldova, composed of a single village with the same name, population 1,094 at the 2004 Census. The locality, although situated on the right (western) bank of the river Dniester, is under the control of the breakaway Transnistrian authorities. On the opposite side of the river lies the city of Slobozia. Of the 1,094 inhabitants of Cremenciug, 464 (42.4%) are Moldovans, 353 (32.27%) Russians, 203 (18.56%) Ukrainians, 22 (2.01%) Germans, 15 (1.37%) Belarusians, 11 (1.01%) Bulgarians, 7 (0.64%) Gagauzians, 6 (0.55%) Armenians, 2 (0.18%) Roma, and 10 (0.91%) others and non-declared.
