= Molovata Nouă =

- Commune
- Location within Moldova
- Coordinates: 47°20′19″N 29°5′26″E
- Country: Moldova
- District: Dubăsari District

Government
  - Mayor: Oleg Mihail Gazea (Party of Communists of the Republic of Moldova)

Area
  - Total: 1.6 km^{2} (0.62 sq mi)
- Elevation: 54 m (177 ft)

Population (2004)
  - Total: 1,851
- Time zone: UTC+2 (EET)
  - Summer (DST): UTC+3 (EEST)
- Postal code: MD-4576

Molovata Nouă is a commune located in Dubăsari District of the Republic of Moldova, on the eastern bank of the River Dniester. It consists of two villages, Molovata Nouă and Roghi (Moldovan Cyrillic: Рогь).

During the 1992 War of Transnistria, the commune was located in the immediate vicinity of heavy fighting. Since the war Molovata Nouă has been controlled by the government of the Republic of Moldova, while Roghi is partly controlled by the secessionist government of Transnistria. The only link between Molovata Nouă and territory controlled by the Government of Moldova is by ferry boat across the Dniester River.

== Population ==
According to the 2004 Moldovan Census, the village Molovata Nouă had a population of 1,851, of which 1,824 were ethnic Moldavians, 23 were from ethnic minorities, and 4 were other or undeclared.

== Notable people ==
- Anatol Codru (1936–2010), writer and film director
