= Dubăsari District =

Coordinates: 47°15′N 29°07′E

Dubăsari
- District (Raion)
- Flag Coat of arms

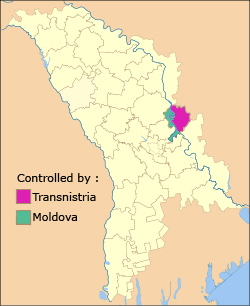
- Country: Republic of Moldova
- Administrative center (Oraş-reşedinţă): Cocieri
- Established: 2023

Government
  - Raion president: Grigoriev Sergiu

Area
  - Total: 309.2 km^{2} (119.4 sq mi)

Population (2024)
  - Total: 21,781
  - Density: 70.44/km^{2} (182.4/sq mi)
- Time zone: UTC+2 (EET)
  - Summer (DST): UTC+3 (EEST)
- Area code: +373 45
- Car plates: DB
- Website: www.dubasari.md

The Dubăsari District (Romanian pronunciation: [dubəˈsarʲ]) is a district in the east of Moldova, with the administrative center at Cocieri. As of the 2024 Moldovan census, its population was 21,781. This does not include the 715 people that live in the village of Roghi, which is controlled by the breakaway Tiraspol authorities. Dubăsari means ferry-arks (see coat of arms).

== History ==
The territory which today is part of Dubăsari district has been inhabited since the Stone Age (50–30000 years BC). Location of the earliest documentary attestation of the district is Corjova, first attested in 1362. Other town with old certificate is Holercani village certified in 1464. This region is part of the Grand Duchy of Lithuania during 1386–1434. In 1393-1812 the part of district, situated on the right, of the Nistru is part of the Principality of Moldova. In this period to develop the economy (trade, agriculture), as population increases. In 1790, the part of district, situated on the left of Nistru is occupied by the Russian Empire had the same fate of Basarabia in 1812. In 1918, after the collapse of the Russian Empire, Basarabia united with Romania, but the part of district on the left of Nistru, is part of the Moldavian ASSR, part of Ukrainian SSR. In 1940 after the Molotov–Ribbentrop Treaty, Basarabia is occupied by the USSR. In 1991 as a result of the proclamation of Independence of Moldova, district is part of Moldova. In 1992, the district is the focus, the Moldovan-Russian War of Transnistria. Following the war, the district is divided into two: one controlled by the Republic of Moldova and the separatist-controlled part of the authorities in Tiraspol, which includes Dubăsari. District is part of the Chişinău County (1991–2003), and in 2003 became administrative unit of Moldova.

== Geography ==
Dubăsari district is located in the central part of Moldova. It has proximity to: Orhei District in north west, south-west Criuleni District, Dubăsari District (separatist territory) in the east. The landscape is predominantly plain (Dniester Middle Plain), but is in the northern part of district high altitude over 200 metres (660 ft), Dniester Plateau. Erosion processes with a low intensity. For the district are characteristic of soil types: chernozem (80%), brown soil, gray soil and alluvial.

=== Climate ===
The climate is of a transition from maritime climate of Western Europe, to temperate-continental Eastern Europe. Summer is warm and long, with average temperature of 22 °C (72 °F) in July and the winter is mild with average January temperature −5 °C (23 °F). Rainfall ranges from 550 to 650 mm (22 to 26 in). For 10 years, three are dry.

=== Fauna ===
The fauna is typical of Central Europe and includes fox, hedgehog, wild boar, deer, wild cat, otter, mink, raccoon dog and others. Of birds there are wild duck, egret, crow, quail, starling, swallow and more.

=== Flora ===
Forests occupy 7.5% of the district and include oak, hornbeam, linden, ash, maple and others. Plants include fescue, mugwort, bell, lentils and more.

=== Rivers ===
Dubăsari district is located in the Dniester river basin. Nistru crosses district from north to south. In 1954 following the construction of Dubăsari hydroelectric power plant, was formed Dubăsari Reservoir, with an area of 68 km^{2} (26 sq mi) and a length of 128 km (80 mi).

== Administrative subdivisions ==
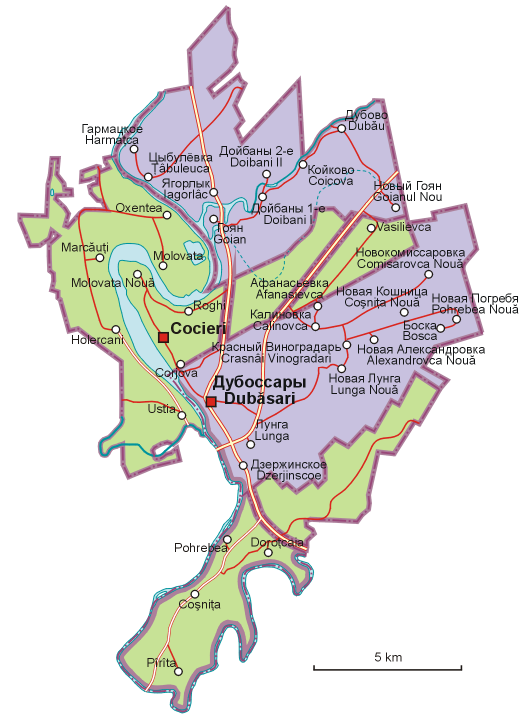
Dubăsari district administrative map (green: the territory controlled by the Republic of Moldova, violet: territory controlled by separatists)

This is the only district in Moldova without cities. There are a total of 15 localities: 11 communes (containing further 4 villages within):

- Cocieri (pop. 4,336)
  - Vasilievca
- Corjova (pop. 3,231)
  - Mahala
- Coșnița (pop. 5,699)
  - Pohrebea
- Doroțcaia (pop. 3,206)
- Holercani (pop. 2,522)
- Marcăuți (pop. 730)
- Molovata (pop. 2,936)
- Molovata Nouă (pop. 1,851 w/o Roghi)
  - Roghi (pop. 715)
- Oxentea (pop. 2,794)
- Pîrîta (pop. 3,415)
- Ustia (pop. 3,295)

Ustia, Holercani, Marcăuți, Oxentea, and Molovata are situated on the western (right) bank of the river Nistru, while the other 10 villages on the eastern bank. Six of the latter (Cocieri, Vasilievca, Corjova, Mahala, Molovata Nouă, and Roghi) are situated north of the city of Dubăsari, itself under the control of the separatist authorities of Transnistria, and the remaining four (Pîrîta, Coșnița, Pohrebea, and Doroțcaia) south of the city.

The village of Vasilievca, as well as considerable parts of the farmland of the villages of Cocieri, Roghi, and Doroțcaia are situated east of the Tiraspol–Dubăsari–Rîbnița road.

== Demographics ==
As of the 2024 Census, the raion's population was 21,781 - all of which is considered rural.

=== Ethnic groups ===
Ethnic group	% of total
Moldovans *	96.4
Romanians *	2.5
Russians	0.4
Ukrainians	0.5
Gagauz	0.1
Bulgarians	0.0
Other	0.1
Undeclared	0.0

Footnote: * There is an ongoing controversy regarding the ethnic identification of Moldovans and Romanians.

=== Religion ===
- Christians - 99.5%
  - Orthodox Christians - 98.%
  - Protestant - 0.9%
- Other - 0.1%
- No Religion - 0.3%
  - Not Declared - 0.1%

== Transportation ==
Specialized automobile companies, transported by bus routes for general use 35,400 passengers or 1.4 times higher than during the previous year. District is served by seven economic providers of public transport services through 12 inter-urban routes and two local routes.

== Politics ==
Traditional Dubăsari district, political and electoral support PCRM unlike the central part of Moldova. This is explained by the fact that this in district was born former Moldovan President Vladimir Voronin, president in 2001–2009. But the last three elections communists is a continuous fall in percentage. District is member of Euroregion Dniester.

During the last three elections AEI had an increase of 116.0%

Parliament elections results
Year	AEI	PCRM
2010	31.98% 5,375	62.30% 10,468
July 2009	29.29% 4,716	67.92% 10,934
April 2009	15.60% 2,488	74.89% 11,944

=== Elections ===
Summary of 28 November 2010 Parliament of Moldova election results in Dubăsari District
Parties and coalitions	Votes	%	+/−
Party of Communists of the Republic of Moldova	10,468	62.30	−5.62
Liberal Democratic Party of Moldova	2,743	16.32	+7.77
Democratic Party of Moldova	1,531	9,11	+0.43
Liberal Party	926	5.51	−2.00
European Action Movement	459	2.73	+2.73
Party Alliance Our Moldova	175	1.04	−3.51
Other Party	506	2.99	+0.20
Total (turnout 59.10%)	16,935	100.00	

== Economy ==
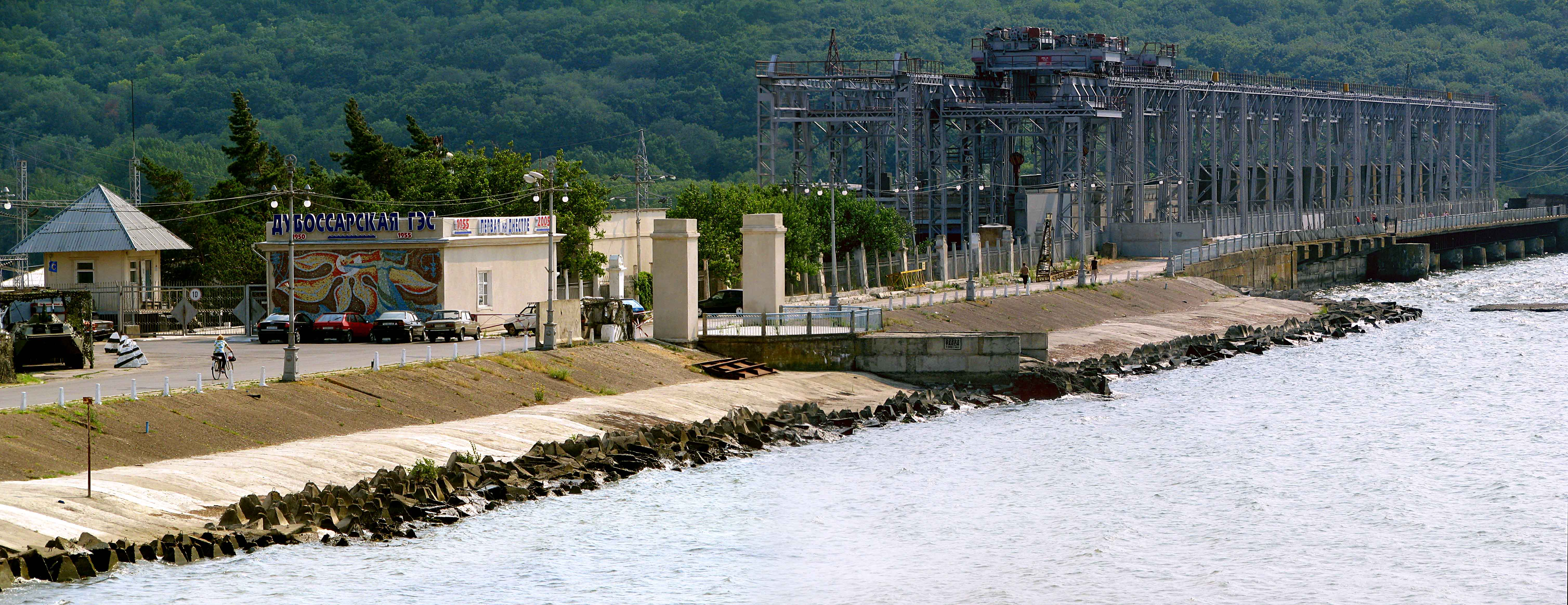
Dubăsari hydroelectric power plant

Industry is represented by 17 companies including SA 'Cannery in Cosnita "SA" Miner ", LLC" ELECOM Plus ", LLC" Tiraston "LLC" Victoria products, "SRL" food oil, "SRL" Cereal Pirita ", LLC" Daro-D ", LLC" Maxlinie MCS "LLC" MoldnisGrup "II" Royal Mill, "II" Ivanov etc., where 260 people are employed. The average wage in the industrial sector is the Dubăsari 2100 lei. In agriculture operating 25 businesses, 6 agricultural production cooperatives, and farms 1167. In this sector 29.7% of the employed population working in the district economy. The coefficient of land consolidation is 80%. Exploitation of about 35% of the arable land of the district is carried out under very difficult because of the separatist authorities, which blocks the transition to land. Failure harvest processing and collection of land beyond the path that causes direct losses and have adverse consequences for agriculture and economy of the district.

== Education ==
The district operates 12 preschools and 15 pre-university education institutions, of which 11 are local subordinate (8 secondary schools, 7 high schools) and four institutions are subordinated to the Ministry of Education, of which Roghi and Corjova gymnasium, the Lyceum Dubăsari teaches students from 13 localities, high school Doroţcaia in working in shifts. Kindergartens in the district are attended by 1360 children and pre-university education institutions in 4776 to teach students literacy being 99.8%. School success is characterized by an average of 7.07 and 7.03 in secondary schools in high schools. In those institutions working in total 431 staff. Pupils per teacher ratio is the 11.08 students.

== Culture ==
In the district there are 12 cultural centers, 17 libraries, including six for children, two music schools, art schools 3, 2 museums, 75 historical monuments. The total number of workers of culture is 150. Number of cultural groups who hold honorary title "training model" is 53. Worker's average monthly salary of culture in 2009 constituted 1230. In studying art schools around 347 students annually. The total is 137,500 copies of books.

== Health ==
The health system operates the Central hospital district, district clinic, dental clinic, hygiene and epidemiology center, rural district hospitals in villages Doibani and Ţîbuleuca.

== Tourism ==
- Scythian tombs of Pohrebea
- Church of Pohrebea (18th century)
- 15 secular pedunculate oaks
