= Doroțcaia =

- Coordinates: 47°10′N 29°12′E
- Country: Moldova
- District: Dubăsari District

Population (2014 census)
  - Total: 3,038

Doroțcaia is a village in the Dubăsari District, Republic of Moldova, situated on the eastern bank of the River Dniester.

The village was a place of fighting during 1992 War of Transnistria. It is now under the control of the central authorities from Chișinău.

The Grigoriopol Romanian-language school which was not allowed to function by the authorities of Transnistria was moved to the village in 2002.

According to the 2014 Moldovan Census, the village had a population of 3,038, of whom 2,976 were ethnic Moldovans, 44 were from ethnic minorities, and 18 were undeclared.

== Political problems ==
On the eastern edge of Doroțcaia passes the strategic road linking Tiraspol and Rîbnița, and separatist authorities from Tiraspol want to control this road. 85% of Doroțcaia's farmland is across the road. From 2003 Transnistrian authorities tried to prevent farmers from accessing their land. Unable to harvest their crops, the farmers suffered serious losses.

This situation lead to an escalation of conflict between farmers and Transnistrian guards. An Organization for Security and Co-operation in Europe mission was formed to find a temporary solution that allows farmers to access their land.
