= Coșnița =

- Commune
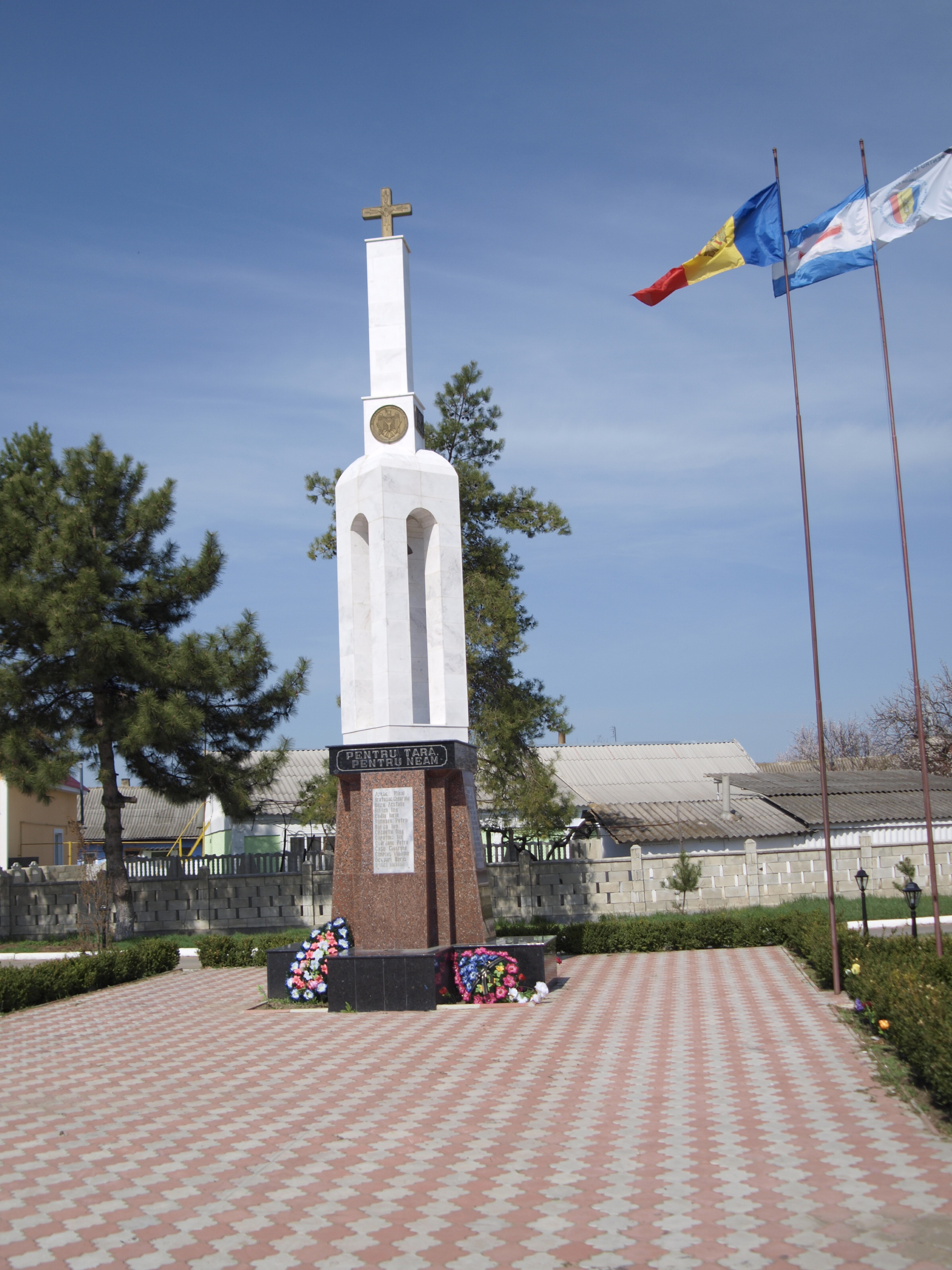
- Monument of the Fallen Heroes of the 1992 War of Transnistria

- Location within Moldova
- Coordinates: 47°8′43″N 29°8′5″E
- Country: Moldova
- District: Dubăsari

Government
  - Mayor: Alexei Gafeli

Area
  - Total: 338 km^{2} (131 sq mi)
- Elevation: 20 m (66 ft)

Population (2014)
  - Total: 5,545
- Time zone: UTC+2 (EET)
  - Summer (DST): UTC+3 (EEST)
- Postal code: MD-4572

Coșnița is a commune located in Dubăsari District of the Republic of Moldova, on the eastern bank of the River Dniester. It consists of two villages, Coșnița and Pohrebea (Romanian: Pohrebea; Russian: Погребя, Pogrebya).

During the 1992 War of Transnistria, the commune was the center of some of the heaviest fighting between the local inhabitants and the government of the Republic of Moldova on one side, and the secessionist government of Transnistria and the Russian 14th Army, on the other. As a legacy of that war, Pogrebea today hosts one of the largest areas of unremoved landmines in the region.

== Population ==
According to the 2004 Moldovan Census, the commune had a population of 5,699 people, of which Coșnița 4,996, and Pohrebea 703. Of these, 5,524 (4,829 in Coșnița, and 695 in Pohrebea) were ethnic Moldavians, 167 (160 in Coșnița, and 7 in Pohrebea) were ethnic minorities, and 9 other/undeclared.

== Etymology ==
In Romanian, pogrebă means 'basement' and -ea is a definite suffix; thus Pohrebea means 'the basement', and Coșnița is derived from the Bulgarian word for 'basket': кошница, koshnitsa.

== Notable people ==
- Petru Soltan (1931-2016), Moldavian mathematician
- Yosef Baratz (1890-1968), Zionist activist and Israeli politician

== See also ==
- War of Transnistria
- Joint Control Commission
