= Cocieri =

Cocieri Кочиеры (Russian) Кочіє́ри (Ukrainian)
- Commune
- Location within Moldova
- Coordinates: 47°18′36″N 29°6′41″E
- Country: Moldova
- District: Dubăsari District

Government
  - Mayor: Spinovschi Raisa
- Elevation: 47 m (154 ft)

Population (2014)
  - Total: 3,885
- Time zone: UTC+2 (EET)
  - Summer (DST): UTC+3 (EEST)
- Postal code: 4571

Cocieri is a commune in the Republic of Moldova, and the administrative center of Dubăsari District. It is located on the eastern bank of the Dniester River, consisting of two villages, Cocieri and Vasilievca.

During 1992 War of Transnistria inhabitants of this village rebelled against the separatist authorities of Transnistria. The military unit of the 14th former Soviet Army which was located in the village was attacked by local inhabitants who armed themselves and opposed the forces of Transnistria. As result, after the war, Cocieri remained in the area controlled by the Republic of Moldova.

The village can only be reached directly from Moldova proper by ferry, which does not run during winter due to ice on the river. Transnistrian authorities control checkpoints on roads out of the commune and charge fees for crossing it.

== Population ==
According to the 2014 Moldovan Census, the commune had a population of 3,885, mostly residing in Cocieri. 3,717 of these were ethnic Moldovans and 168 from other ethnic groups. Due to the economic situation mainly elderly residents remain in the village.

== Education ==
In the village is a Romanian language school with 560 pupils and a kindergarten with 100 children. Since Cocieri is in a Republic of Moldova-controlled area, the school uses the Latin script.

== Political problems ==
Separatist authorities from Tiraspol have in the past attempted to make life more difficult for Cocieri's inhabitants. Several properties belonging to Cocieri companies were confiscated by Transnistria's authorities and 7 km² (1,700 acres) of land remains unworked because of the obstacles that the separatists put against the free movement of the people of Cocieri.

== Notable people ==
- Vlad Ioviță (1935–1983), Soviet Moldavian film director, writer and publicist
- Valentina Basiul (1982–2025), Moldovan journalist
