= Pîrîta =

Pîrîta Пирита (Ukrainian)
- Village
- Location within Transnistria
- Coordinates: 47°6′25″N 29°7′12″E
- Country: Moldova
- District: Dubăsari

Government
  - Mayor: Iurie Soltan (PDM)
- Elevation: 19 m (62 ft)

Population (2014 census)
  - Total: 3,413
- Time zone: UTC+2 (EET)
  - Summer (DST): UTC+3 (EEST)
- Postal code: MD-4579

Pîrîta is a village in Dubăsari District, Moldova.

== Notable people ==
- Vadim Pisari, died in the 2012 Moldova security zone incident

== See also ==
- 2012 Moldova security zone incident
