= Nikita Salogor =

Moldovan Soviet politician

- Nichita Salogor; Никита Салогор

First Secretary (ad interim) of the Communist Party of Moldavia
- In office 7 September 1942 – 18 July 1946
- Prime Minister: Tihon Konstantinov; Nicolae Coval
- Preceded by: Piotr Borodin
- Succeeded by: Nicolae Coval

Personal details
- Born: 15 August 1901 Konstantinovka, Russian Empire (now Ukraine)
- Died: 24 June 1982 (aged 80) Chișinău, Moldavian SSR, Soviet Union
- Other political affiliations: Communist Party of the Soviet Union (1930–1982)

Nikita Leontyevich Salogor (Russian: Никита Леонтьевич Салогор, Romanian: Nichita Leontie Salogor or Salagor, Ukrainian: Микита Леонтійович Салогор, romanized: Mykyta Leontiyovych Salohor; 15 August 1901 – 24 June 1982) was a Moldavian and Soviet politician who served as First Secretary of the Communist Party of Moldavia (PCM) in 1942–1946.

Of Romanian Ukrainian or Moldovan roots, he had a kulak mother, whom he openly denounced later in life. Salogor's early career was in agricultural institutions of the Ukrainian SSR and the Moldavian Autonomous Soviet Socialist Republic, where he also advanced politically. Following the Soviet advance into Bessarabia in 1940, he joined the leadership of the Moldavian SSR. Immediately promoted to Junior Secretary of the PCM, he was co-opted on its Politburo in early 1941, and took part in a workforce recruitment drive, which is described by historian Ion Varta as connected to the deportation of native Romanians.

Shortly after the German attack on the Soviet Union, Salogor and other PCM leaders withdrew to Soviet Russia, but still sought to exercise command over partisan units organizing in Bessarabia. During this interval, Salogor was able to outmaneuver Piotr Borodin, taking up Borodin's position as First Secretary. He finally returned to Soviet Moldavia in March 1944, and joined the provisional government formed in Soroca. During and after the region's reconquest in August 1944, he involved himself in reconstructing the party structures and investigating the spread of anti-communist resistance. He also managed responses to the Moldavian famine, and set up the Moldavian State University.

Cultivating national communism and posthumously labelled a Moldovenist, Salogor advanced an irredentist project, hoping to increase the Moldavian SSR by incorporating the whole of Romanian Moldavia, as well as the Budjak and Bukovina (Greater Moldova). These proposals threatened the Ukrainian SSR's territorial integrity, and were as such vetoed by Nikita Khrushchev. Salogor lost his PCM positions shortly after, and sent to work as an agricultural manager in Krasnodar Krai. He was allowed to return in 1950, when Moldavian Premier Gherasim Rudi assigned him minor positions in his cabinet. His attempt to undermine PCM leader Nicolae Coval resulted in another demotion. He was only included on the Central Committee in the 1970s, by which time he was already retired and ailing.

== Biography ==
=== Early life ===
Salogor was born on 15 August 1901, though some of his official biographies had 1902. His place of birth was Konstantinovka village, which was then part of Kherson Governorate, Russian Empire (and is now in Mykolaiv Oblast, Ukraine). Though described in official records as a poor peasant with only a secondary education, it remains attested that the Salogor family had "unhealthy" social origins according to Soviet class definitions, and for this reason Nikita cut off all links with his relatives. According to his own words, he had stopped communicating with his mother in 1918, when she had remarried; in 1930, she would be caught up in the Dekulakization campaign. Between 1921 and 1924 (that is, for much of the Russian Civil War and though the early months of the Soviet Union), Salogor was active in the Red Army's ranks.

From 1924, areas near Konstantinovka were absorbed by the Moldavian ASSR, set up for Romanians and Moldovans in the Ukrainian SSR; most of present-day Moldova, or historical Bessarabia, was at the time united with Romania. Historian Lilia Crudu argues that Salogor, like his colleague Nicolae Coval, became a "Moldovan" or "Moldavian" only as a byword for his geographic origins in that area, where he also received his communist training; she notes that Salogor was not a native speaker of Romanian (or "Moldovan"). Similarly, ethnic Romanian author Ion Costaș sees Salogor and Coval as "ideologized beyond measure" and no longer belonging to a specific ethnic culture. This is contrasted by another scholar, Igor Cașu, who notes that Salogor was an ethnic Romanian from Ukraine, and simultaneously a Moldovan—Cașu regards these as two complementary identities. The label of "Moldovan" also appears in the nationality rubric on his political files.

Salogor moved to other areas of Ukraine in 1924. First employed as the manager of a cooperative credit enterprise, he held a variety of jobs in agricultural enterprises. He was tasked with agricultural projects in Rîbnița and Ocna Roșie Districts (1933–1935), before being integrated into the political establishment of the Moldavian ASSR. Salogor moved there in 1930, as part of a wave of new arrivals which were meant to infuse the local political structures with stricter Stalinism. He was successively president of a raion-level union, a sovkhoz manager, and chairman of the Executive Committee (Ispolkom) of integrating uezd. He was by then a card-carrying member of the Communist Party of the Soviet Union, which remained his only affiliation until 1940.

In 1937, Salogor graduated from the Ukrainian Academy for People's Commissars in the Food Industry and from Moscow's Stalin Academy. The same year, he was elected a Moldavian deputy to the Supreme Soviet of the Soviet Union, and, by 1939, he was the Regional Soviet leader in Slobozia District. In late June 1940, Soviet forces occupied Bessarabia. Most of the region was merged with areas previously included in the Moldavian ASSR, to form the Moldavian SSR, while the Budjak in the south, and Hotin County in the north, were incorporated with the Ukrainian SSR. Salogor moved into the new republic, and became Junior Secretary of the Communist Party of Moldavia (PCM), serving under Piotr Borodin, from August or October 1940. He was additionally head of the Orhei County Soviet. During the 1941 one-party legislative election, he became a Telenești deputy in the Supreme Republican Soviet.

In August–November 1940, Salogor was personally involved in the drive to recruit Bessarabian workforce for the Soviet industry. His report on the "organized mobilization of labor for the Soviet industry" acknowledged that 59,500 people from "the former Bessarabia" were enlisted—but expressed his dissatisfaction, as this fell below the planned 77,000. Salogor promised to exercise "rigorous control" and ensure the fulfillment of quotas. Historian Ion Varta believes that the recruitment drive was part of the mass deportation of Romanians, since it main targets were the rural regions "with an overwhelming Romanian majority" and constituted a "premeditated policy of destroying the Romanian element [of Bessarabia], in order to diminish its weight in relation to the Russian-speaking minority groups". An earlier report by the Presidential Commission for the Study of the Communist Dictatorship in Romania noted that such interpretations are "exaggerated", as a significant part of the workers voluntarily enrolled due to prevailing poverty and astute Soviet propaganda. The Moldavian leadership reported that 5,110 recruits from the initial wave returned as they were deemed unfit or could not be accommodated. According to Varta, this ensured that "the whole population [...] soon learned the truth about the infernal conditions in which inductees were put to work, a matter which later pushed Romanian Bessarabians to resist the policies enforced by Soviet occupation authorities".

=== Wartime leadership ===
In July 1941, when Salogor had joined the PCM Politburo, Nazi Germany began its attack on the Soviet Union; in Bessarabia, this also involved Romanian troops, who managed to annex the region. The PCM reorganized further inland, but its territorial structures disintegrated, with Salogor himself relocating to Odessa by 14 August. He was then tasked with communicating with Soviet partisans in Bessarabia, effectively as their leader. While most of his former subordinates joined the Red Army, Salogor continued to do political work. By November 1941, he was in Leninsk as one of three political figures still representing the PCM leadership—alongside M. M. Bessanov and B. I. Kondratenko.

Borodin had been attached to the Southern Front, which gave Salogor control of the party; however, he made repeated attempts to reassert his personal tutelage. In March 1942, the PCM's Central Committee investigated Salogor's social origins, but he was able to persuade his colleagues, Borodin included, that he was a reliable cadre. Both men attempted to obtain increased funding from the Soviet government, with Salogor asking for 222,000 roubles to finance a five-man government of the Moldavian SSR (this request was denied, probably because it was excessively high). In that context, Salogor remained Junior Secretary to 1946, but also supplanted Borodin to become First Secretary of the PCM, on 7 September 1942. He managed to topple his rival by reporting on Borodin's insubordination and violent tactics. However, he could not fully persuade his Soviet overseers, who merely recognized him as an ad interim party leader; his powerful rivals included Nikita Khrushchev, who regarded the PCM as an annex of the Ukrainian Communists.

On 24 June 1942, Salogor received from Colonel Abayev a plan to organize partisan units in Bessarabia—described by historian Anton Moraru as "groups of terrorists and diversionists". After victory at Stalingrad in early 1943, the Red Army took the offensive, and Salogor became a more direct participant in military operations. He was personally involved in selecting PCM cadres for missions behind enemy lines. As the Soviets reestablished their presence in Ukrainian lands, Salogor called on Nikolai Mikhailovich Frolov to take up command over partisan units in Bessarabia. As Frolov reports, no such units actually existed, mainly because "hostile elements" and "Boyar Romania" held the region in full control. Some Moldavian-designated multinational groups were established by September, when they participated in an attack on Shepetivka railway station in Reichskommissariat Ukraine, and reportedly killed some 2,000 Germans. According to Moraru, these units were generally made up of Moldavian Russians and Ukrainians, with only "20 Russified Moldovans" registered by 1944. During the Battle of the Dnieper in late 1943, Salogor was also in contact with the Ukrainian partisans, reporting on their attacks on the Ukrainian Insurgent Army, in preparation for the eventual capture of Kiev.

The Moldavian SSR in March–August 1944, showing front line and anti-/pro-Soviet resistance centers

From March 1944, the Soviet conquest of northern Bessarabia saw him traveling to Soroca, which became the provisional capital of a rump Moldavian SSR. Fiodor Brovco took charge of a Moldavian Supreme Soviet, while Salogor continued to exercise PCM leadership as "Second Secretary". The offensive also brought the Red Army in control of Romania's Transnistria Governorate, including the former Moldavian ASSR—parts of which were returned to the Moldavian republic. An evacuation of the local populace followed. Mikhail Markeyev, chief of the NKVD in the Soroca government, reported to Salogor that this operation was carried out in an abusive manner, which could only engender "severe criticism" against the returning Soviets. Salogor repeated that point in letters he sent to General Ivan Susaykov of the 2nd Ukrainian Front, detailing the Red Army's systematic looting in Bessarabia. When Susaykov ignored him, Salogor turned to Georgy Malenkov of the Orgburo, informing him that such abuse "create[d] a favorable terrain for the emergence of illegal anti-Soviet activities." He argued at the time that a movement against Red Army requisitioning, which sparked a riot at Ochiul Alb, was being encouraged by clandestine far-right groups, namely the National Christian Party and the Iron Guard. During May, Salogor himself was informed about an attack by anti-Soviet irregulars, which had resulted in incapacitating the PCM cell in Ciulucani. He noted with concern the spread of draft evasion, and, in June, demanded a head count of deserters.

Salogor's 1982 obituary noted his role in ensuring "the rebirth of the republic's national economy" upon its "liberation from the fascist occupiers". In July 1944, he traveled to Moscow to ask for funding and the reestablishment of the Moldavian SSR's political press. As a result, he was tasked with reissuing Moldova Socialistă daily, which had been previously managed from Moscow by a panel of journalists (variously including Emilian Bucov, Bogdan Istru, and Sorin Toma). This occurred just as the Red Army was taking full control of Bessarabia, meaning that Salogor could return to exercise his political assignments from Chișinău. Shortly after, he traveled to the Romanian city of Iași, confiscating furniture and supplies to serve as the material basis for the new PCM patrimony. The loot, which included bathtubs, mattresses, and family portraits, was sent to Chișinău in 45 train carts. He himself accused the previous Romanian administration of having destroyed the Moldavian Bessarabian patrimony, including 6 million books—this claim is rejected as manipulative by librarian Maria Vieru-Ișaev.

In August or September 1944, Salogor asked Malenkov to reopen the Moldavian Teachers' College and form a State University around it. The latter institution was ultimately founded, independent of the Teachers' College, in April 1946, but, as its staff complained to Salogor, its existence was still purely formal. Salogor was also involved in overhauling the Moldavian Institute for Scientific Research, based on formal suggestions made by scholar Uładzimir Piczeta. This activity is described by historians Ion Xenofontov and Lidia Prisac as the root of anti-Romanian "indoctrination", creating the "necessary political conditions to disseminate 'Moldovenist' propaganda throughout society, as a means of [its] ethno-national eradication."

Between those dates, at a PCM Plenary of January 1945, Salogor still complained that Moldavian Russians cultivated anti-Romanianism and hostility toward Moldovans, whom they described as "shifty" and "fascist". In March 1946, Stalin recalled Markeyev, whom Salogor had denounced as a persecutor of the local populace. However, the First Secretary also viewed Bessarabia as backward, identifying Moldovan women as a vector of religious conservatism. Based on this argument, he asked Malenkov to approve the establishment of regional female sections of the PCM. During the 1945 and 1946 Plenaries, he raised the issue of anti-Soviet resistance in the Moldavian SSR, which he saw as directly encouraged by the Orthodox Church and the Inochentists. He described resisters as "traitors" and kulaks, recounting that one Romanian man openly bragged about educating his children to be "fascists". He made special note of saboteurs working to disrupt the Moldavian Railways. When members of a student group in Vadul lui Vodă came to be labeled as fascists, and objected to the charges, Salogor took their reply as proof that they were a solid organization of anti-communists.

=== Irredentism and backlash ===
Map of an enlarged Moldavian SSR, based on the various proposals collected by Salogor. The Moldavian SSR, 1947 borders Western Moldavia and southern Bukovina (in Romania) Maramureș and Năsăud counties (in Romania), presented as an ancestral homeland of the Moldavians The Budjak, Hotin County, northern Bukovina, and Hertsa region (held by the Ukrainian SSR) Shaded area represents the old Governorate of Bessarabia; outlined areas represent the old Duchy of Bukovina (to the west) and the dismantled Moldavian ASSR (to the east).

As the Red Army also began its occupation of Romania, Salogor began campaigning for establishing a new Moldavian state under Soviet rule, which would have extended into both Romania (Western Moldavia, as well as Năsăud and Maramureș counties) and the Ukrainian SSR (the Budjak to the south, Bukovina to the north); the territory of this Greater Moldavia would have been significantly greater than the 18th-century Principality. On 29 June 1946, the Moldavian Supreme Soviet went public with the irredentist goals, proclaiming foremost the need to "free [Moldavian lands] from the yoke of Romanian boyars and capitalists".

As noted by Romanian critics, the project formed part of a Soviet "extortion" mechanism, meant to increase pressures on Romanian delegates at the Paris Peace Conference, which was set to begin in July. Salogor personally put the proposal into a collective report, and submitted it for review by Soviet Premier Joseph Stalin. His direct contribution was an introductory letter, which argued for the stately unity of "Moldovans" and the economic importance of the Budjak, while other parts of the document repeated proposals first made by PCM-affiliated academics in 1943. As noted by Cașu, it constituted the earliest sample of "national communism" and "Moldovenism" in Soviet Bessarabia, but was also an attempt by Salogor to legitimize his regime.

Though reelected to the Supreme Soviet in February 1946, Salogor lost all his executive positions on 18 July (with Coval returning as First Secretary). He was forcefully retired to Moscow, to undergo ideological training. According to Cașu, this was probably because Salogor's letter was explicit in demanding the annexation of Ukrainian lands, an idea which Khrushchev and the Ukrainian establishment found especially unpalatable: a Moldavian state would have implicitly validated Romanian claims in Bessarabia, Bukovina, and the Budjak. This notion is partly backed by historian Ruslan Șevcenco, who argues that Moldavian Ukrainians in the PCM's leadership made sure to ignore Salogor's proposal. While Coval remained "cowardly and egotistical" when it came to reporting on the Moldavian famine of 1946, Salogor documented its impact in his letters to Anastas Mikoyan, the Minister of Foreign Trade. Though such texts proposed massive reductions in the grain quotas that the Moldavian SSR owed to Moscow, Cașu notes that they most likely played no part in Salogor's downfall.

Coval took over leadership as Khruschev's supporter, and was responsible for the republic renouncing its access to the Black Sea (at Palanca) in favor of Ukraine. In 1948, Salogor was overseeing vegetable production in Krasnodar Krai, being finally allowed back into the Moldavian SSR in 1950. He asked Moldavian Premier Gherasim Rudi to assign him a government portfolio, but bluntly refused to be appointed as the Junior Minister of Forestry, since this would have meant him traveling out of the country; he only accepted temporary appointment as Junior Minister for Meat and Dairy, and was promised future appointment as Minister of Local Industry. He was reconfirmed to the Supreme Soviet in the elections of 1951, this time at Vărăncău—though he was in fact a resident of the capital city, Chișinău.

From January 1947, Salogor had been involved in attempts to undermine Coval by exposing his family links to pro-Romanian groups in Bessarabia. He directed similar attacks against Rudi at the PCM Plenary of July 1950, but this only resulted in his own "unhealthy" social origins being brought up for discussion. Rudi also questioned his rival's competence, bringing up humiliating anecdotes about Salogor's ministerial tenure. Salogor was demoted to manager of the Moldavian Vegetables' Trust, a position which he would eventually lose on 1 July 1957. Another attempt to obtain the Budjak's annexation was made in 1959 by Artiom Lazarev, the Moldavian Minister of Culture.

Salogor served in other "unimportant offices" to 1959, when he collected his pension, but was re-inducted into the PCM Central Committee in 1971, and reconfirmed in 1976. At the time, the PCM had come under the leadership of Ivan Bodiul—seen by Costaș as more committed to Moldavian autonomy then Salogor ever was. However, no PCM leader or Moldovenist scholar ever produced another territorial demand on Ukraine, down to April 1990. During the interval, some politicians still made oblique references to Western Moldavia as an irredenta, leaving the cause of Ukrainian territories to be embraced by dissidents such as Alexandru Usatiuc-Bulgăr. Having fallen severely ill by 1980, Salogor pleaded with the Central Committee of the Communist Party of the Soviet Union, asking to receive its nomenklatura privileges, including a larger pension. Though reviewed favorably in his Moldavian colleagues, the request was denied in Moscow. He lived the rest of his life in the Moldavian SSR, dying in Chișinău, "after long and great suffering", on 24 June 1982. He was a recipient of the Order of the Patriotic War, 1st Class, the Order of the October Revolution, and the Order of the Red Banner.

== General references ==
- "România la finalul celui de-al doilea război mondial în Europa. Documente inedite". Magazin Istoric (in Romanian): 15–22. June 1995.
- Cașu, Igor (2012). "Organizația de partid comunistă din RSSM în contextul începutului Războiului Germano–Sovietic (1941)". In Mihai Baciu; Silvia Bocancea (eds.). Basarabia După 200 de Ani. Lucrările Conferinței Internaționale 'Basarabia După 200 de Ani'. Iași (in Romanian). Institutul European. pp. 363–386. OCLC 931021432.
- Cașu, Igor; Pâslariuc, Virgil (2010). "Chestiunea revizuirii hotarelor RSS Moldovenești: de la proiectul 'Moldova Mare' la proiectul 'Basarabia Mare' și cauzele eșecului acestora (decembrie 1943 – iunie 1946)". Archiva Moldaviæ (in Romanian). II: 275–370.
- Costaș, Ion (2012). Transnistria, 1989–1992: Cronica unui război "nedeclarat (in Romanian). Bucharest: RAO Publishing.
- Crudu, Lilia (2015). "Marginalii la biografia unui funcționar de partid – cazul Gherasim Rudi". In Marius Tărîță (ed.). Cadrele de Partid și Sovietice Din RASSM și RSSM (1924–1956). Chișinău: Academy of Sciences of Moldova & Tehnica-Info. pp. 7–20. ISBN 9789975633888.
- Crudu, Lilia (2018). "Politica de cadre a aparatului superior de partid în RSSM (1940–1941/1944)". Tyragetia (in Romanian). XII (2): 195–214.
- Dumitru, Diana; Cașu, Igor; Cușco, Andrei; Negură, Petru, eds. (2013). "Începuturile resovietizării Basarabiei și starea de spirit a populației (martie–septembrie 1944)". Al Doilea Război Mondial: Memorie Si Istorie in Estul Si Vestul Europei (in Romanian). Editura Cartier & Editura Codex. pp. 121–140. ISBN 978-9975-79-803-7.
- Frolov, Nikolai Mikhailovich (1968). "Поезда летели под откос". Б боях за Молдавию (in Russian). Vol. II. Chișinău: Cartea Moldovenească. pp. 105–127.
- Șevcenco, Ruslan (2008). "Crearea Universității de Stat din Moldova (1944–1946). Pagini necunoscute". Studia Universitatis. Revistă a Universității de Stat din Moldova (in Romanian). 16 (6): 33–38. ISSN 1857-209X.
- Șevcenco, Ruslan (2014). "The Danube — the Southern Border of Moldova. Historical Aspects". Journal of Danubian Studies and Research. IV (2): 151–158.
- Șevcenco, Ruslan (2016). "Rezistența antisovietică în RSS Moldovenească: anul 1944". Enciclopedica. Revista de Istorie a Științei și Studii Enciclopedice (in Romanian) (1): 50–59.
- Șevcenco, Ruslan (2017). "The Antisoviet Resistance of 1945 in the Socialist Republic of Moldova" (PDF). Literature, Discourses and the Power of Multicultural Dialogue. V: 263–271.
- Tărîță, Marius (2015). "Prioritățile Biroului CC al PC(b)M din mai 1941 până în decembrie 1944 (I)". In Marius Tărîță (ed.). Cadrele de Partid și Sovietice Din RASSM și RSSM (1924–1956) (in Romanian). Chișinău: Academy of Sciences of Moldova & Tehnica-Info. pp. 38–48. ISBN 9789975633888.
- Varta, Ion; et al. (2015). Simion Carp (ed.). "Recrutări a 59.500 de români basarabeni din R.S.S. Moldovenească la munci forțate în perioada 26 august–noiembrie 1940". Criminalitatea Politică: Reflecții Istorico-juridice, Manifestări, Consecințe (in Romanian). Chișinău: Ștefan cel Mare Academy: 28–38.

Party political offices
Preceded by Piotr Borodin	First Secretary of the Communist Party of Moldavia; 7 September 1942 – 18 July 1946	Succeeded by Nicolae Coval
