= Moldovan resistance during World War II =

Moldovan resistance during WWII

- Part of Resistance during World War II and the Eastern Front of World War II
Date	July 1941 – August 1944
Location	Bessarabia Governorate, Bukovina Governorate, Transnistria Governorate (present day Moldova and Ukraine)
Result	Soviet victory; Romania joins the Allies after King Michael's coup in 1944; Soviet troops reoccupy Bessarabia and North Bukovina in 1944; Re-establishment of the Moldovan SSR

Belligerents
Romania; Germany	(Moldavian Soviet Socialist Republic) Moldovan partisans Supported by: Soviet Union

Commanders and leaders
Michael I of Romania (D); Ion Antonescu; Constantin Voiculescu; Olimpiu Stavrat; Alexandru Rioșanu # Corneliu Calotescu; Corneliu Dragalina; Gheorghe Alexianu; Gheorghe Potopeanu; Gherman Pântea	Nikita Salogor; Gherasim Rudi; Vasily Timoshchuk; Nikolai Frolov; Izrail Morgenshtern (executed); Ivan Aleshin; Vasily Andreyev

The Moldovan resistance during World War II opposed Axis-aligned Romania and Nazi Germany, as part of the larger Soviet partisan movement. The Moldavian Soviet Socialist Republic (MSSR), presently Moldova, had been created in August 1940 after a Soviet annexation, and then was invaded by Romania in 1941 during Operation Barbarossa. Moldovan resistance straddled across a new administrative border: in 1941–1944, Bessarabia was reincorporated within Romania as a semi-autonomous governorate, while areas across the Dnister were administered into a separate Transnistria Governorate. Shortly after the German–Romanian invasion of June–July 1941, the Communist Party of Moldavia (PCM) ordered the creation of a partisan network. The order was largely ineffective in creating an organized movement due to the rapid disintegration of Soviet territorial structures in Bessarabia. Some early organizers opted to abandon their posts, and Soviet attempts to infiltrate experienced partisans across the front line were often annihilated by the Special Intelligence Service. Nevertheless, partisan formations were still able to stage large-scale attacks on the Romanian infrastructure, at Bender and elsewhere. While Romanian documents identified categories of locals influenced by communist ideas as a passive component of the resistance, various modern commentators point to the overall unpopularity of communism in Bessarabia as accounting for the movement's marginality.

Nikita Salogor, the PCM Junior Secretary, was assigned to the task of establishing a partisan branch in Bessarabia and Transnistria from his headquarters in Leninsk. Linked to the PCM and the Central Headquarters of the Partisan Movement, the emerging guerilla force was multinational, with Romanians or Moldovans generally underrepresented; while some partisan groups were always active against the Romanian Army in Bessarabia, until 1944 most of the Moldovan-designated units of the Central Headquarters fought against the Wehrmacht and the Ukrainian Insurgent Army in Reichskommissariat Ukraine. Their commandants included Vasily Andreyev, Ivan Aleshin, Nikolai Mikhailovich Frolov, and Gherasim Rudi.

From 1943, with the turn of tides on the Eastern Front, partisan activity increased, as did its repression by Romanian and German forces. Two Romanian counterintelligence units, Centers B and H, were moved to Bessarabia to assist in the effort. Northern Bessarabia fell to the Soviets during the Dnieper–Carpathian Offensive of early 1944, which exposed the south to further penetration by the SMERSH, and saw Moldovan partisan units moving in to assist the Red Army. Following the Soviet advance into Romania, the MSSR was fully reestablished, and the SMERSH could begin hunting down those Moldovans who had participated in the anti-partisan effort. This clash also witnessed massacres of captured partisans by the retreating Axis armies, at camps set up in Tiraspol and Rîbnița.

Soviet historiography and propaganda writing acclaimed Moldovan anti-Nazi resistance, which features in Alexander Fadeyev's Young Guard. Various anti- and post-Soviet authors have revisited that image, in some cases describing the partisans as terrorists. Some enduring controversies exist about the role of minorities, and especially those Bessarabian Jews who were targeted by the Holocaust, and whose contribution was generally overshadowed in Soviet sources. By contrast, Romanian writer Constantin Virgil Gheorghiu introduced polemical claims according to which all partisan groups were primarily Jewish.

== Activity ==
=== Early presence ===
During early 1941, Romanian Conducător Ion Antonescu began full preparation for a clash with the Soviets over the recovery of Bessarabia and northern Bukovina. In May, after being informed of Operation Barbarossa, Antonescu expressed his "absolute faith" in Nazi Germany, conceiving of Bessarabia's planned annexation as both an act of retribution and a component of the "holy war" on communism. Antonescu's preparation included hearing reports from his various intelligence agencies as to how the Red Army might organize the defense. The Fourth Romanian Army, garrisoned in Bacău, observed Soviet soldiers stationed in the MSSR, and reported with confidence that the recruits were untrained and always on the brink of a surrender. The Special Intelligence Service (SSI) returned a more pessimistic verdict, which included mention of the Soviet tendency to extend war into the enemy's territory. SSI agents warned that the Soviets could also reap the benefits of peacetime propaganda, "attract[ing] the worker and peasant masses from the enemy's army, as well as the [civilian] population, to the side of the revolution."

On 30 June 1941, eight days after the start of the Axis invasion, the PCM Central Committee issued a letter to local party committees with instructions for the creation of underground organizations and a partisan movement behind enemy lines. It recommended that personnel for underground work should be selected from the prewar members of the clandestine Bessarabian communist organization, and that partisan groups should include people with good knowledge of the language and local conditions. The letter advised that extreme precaution should be taken to preserve conspiracy, especially in Bessarabian regions, and that partisan groups and partisans detachments should initially only include up to 10–15 individuals. In accordance with these instructions, the PCM decided on the creation of three underground party committees, 13 underground party organizations and 8 partisan detachments in the parts of the republic east of the Dniester, while in Bessarabian territories it envisioned 139 partisan detachments and a number of underground partisan groups. In all, it assigned 1,479 individuals for organizational duties related to the partisan movement. The Red Army and the secret police, or NKVD, both began the task of arming locals, but failed to keep up with the pace of Axis attacks. Meanwhile, a "Bessarabian" or "Moldovan" anti-Nazi cell was formed in Nazi-occupied France, following a split in the Romanian Communist Party. This group, having had an undecided status before the Nazi–Soviet war of 1941, constituted the Bessarabian Union, which channeled support for the French Resistance and collected funds for hit-and-run attacks on German targets.

In Bessarabia, the rapid advance of Axis troops accounted for a fast disintegration of government structures and PCM networks. Romanian Army sources reported that most localities openly welcomed the new administration; more in-depth analyses by the Gendarmerie expressed concern about the "Bessarabian mindset", proposing that Soviet indoctrination had depleted the region of pro-Romanian sentiments. However, as noted by historian Igor Cașu, many PCM cadres opted not to evacuate the region, preferring Romanian occupation: "[they] had experienced the Stalinist Terror of the 1930s and knew what they could expect with the return of Soviet administration." Official Soviet estimates suggest that 100,000 Moldovans, including some 2,200 PCM cadres, escaped into the Ukrainian SSR. According to Cașu, this number is artificially high, and excludes those who returned to Bessarabia "once the danger of Soviet reprisals had faded." In August 1941, the PCM Central Committee dispatched commissar Luca Diacenko, the former MSSR Minister of Forestry, into Romanian-held territory, where he was to organize an active resistance. Diacenko sent back messages declaring that he was unsuited for the task, and was consequently stripped of his party membership. Another activist sent over to organize the partisans was Pincus Turkenici, who also opted not to engage in such work; he was put on trial for desertion. The organizational work of MSSR cells had to be pursued clandestinely under enemy occupation; some of the envisioned partisan detachments and underground organizations never became active.

Various groups were still attested as active behind the Axis front line against the Romanian Army and wartime administration. Already in July 1941, scattered groups of partisans and "gangs of armed civilians" attacked the Fourth Army's armored brigades, causing only minimal damage. On 6 July, the Komsomol youth of Șaptebani, including both Bessarabian Jews and Moldovans, reorganized into a resistance cell. Two of its members, the Mordar brothers, shot and killed a German soldier, and were subsequently put to death in Petrușeni. One small unit was formed at Voinova by A. N. Romanenko around 14 July, and was probably responsible for the subsequent detonation of a railway bridge in nearby Bucovăț, before being betrayed and captured by pro-Romanian civilians.

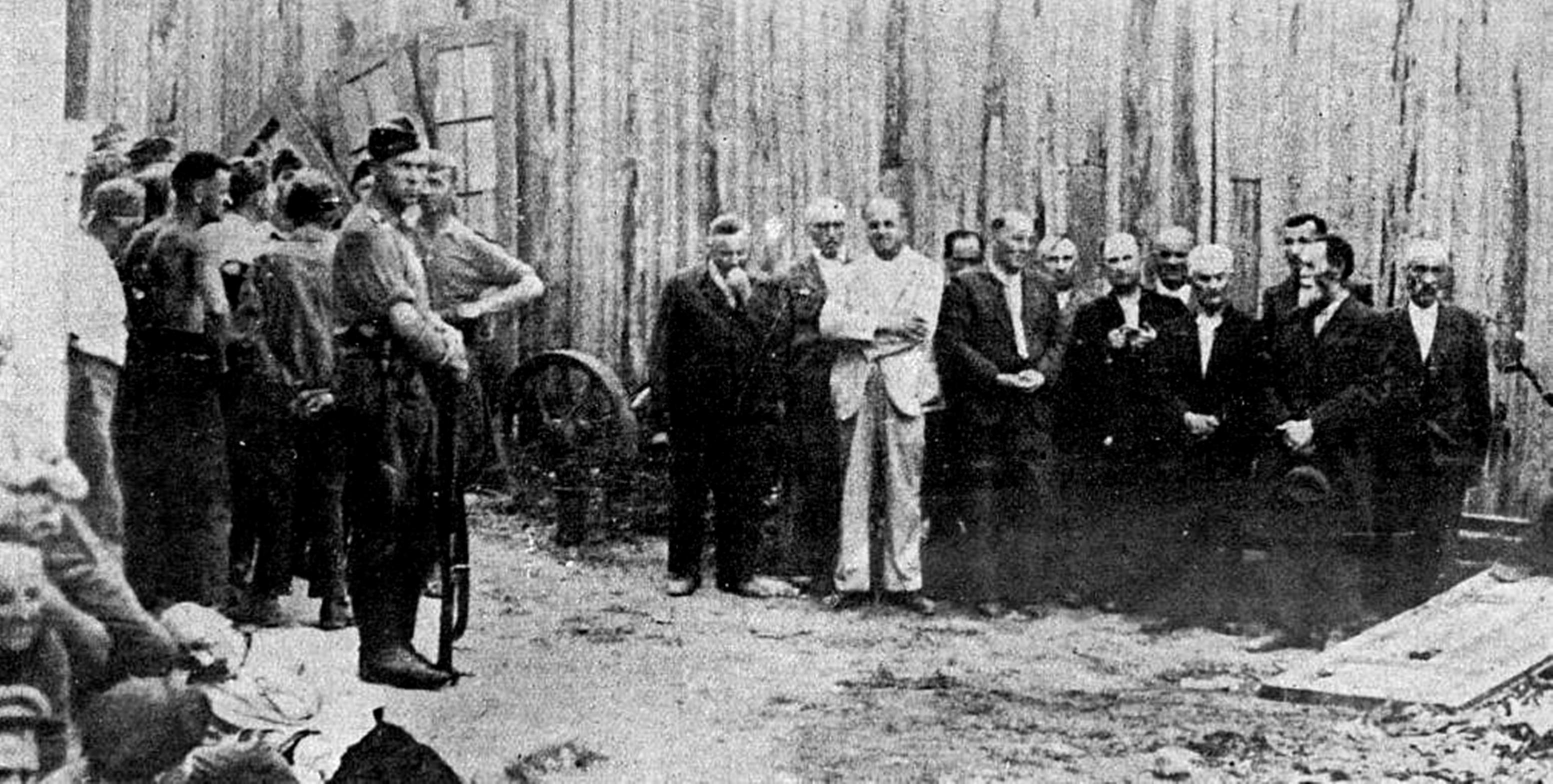
Members of the Bălți Judenrat awaiting execution (15 July 1941). Bernard Walter (third from the left, in the white suit) was the only survivor of this lot

Romanian reports indicate several instances of gunfire directed at German personnel and trucks around Bălți. During one such raid, partisans Vasile Cojocaru and Nikolai Kavchuk successfully disarmed a Wehrmacht patrol and absconded with its rifles. On 15 July, members of Bălți's Judenrat were ordered to hand in any communists that they knew to be hiding in the local ghetto, but refused to comply. Retribution followed: 66 Jews, including 20 Judenrat hostages, were gunned down by the Schutzstaffel. Following one other partisan attack on 19 July, the German command ordered the local police to detain 75 men as hostages, all of whom were subsequently executed.

Troops garrisoned in Chișinău were also targeted by partisan attacks, beginning when Valerian Trikolich threw a grenade at a Romanian battery in Pushkin Park. Sabotage was also reported during the early days of occupation, with workers burying the industrial equipment at Chișinău ceramic tiles factory, or setting fire to the city's soap factory. Some groups were formed that were largely independent of the PCM—groups espousing Soviet patriotism, and sometimes manned by Komsomol youth, were established at Berlinți, Beleavinți, and Sîngerei, while Jews in Briceni formed a self-defense unit which prevented a pogrom. The latter group, comprising 47 people, was involved in a shootout with Romanian troops on 22 July.

=== Setbacks ===
The occupation authorities responded by scaling up repression. Upon creating their Transnistria Governorate, Romanian authorities established in Tiraspol a large concentration camp for Red Army soldiers and captured partisans. In the long run, this had the unintended effect of pushing locals to organize into underground networks to help detainees escape, sometimes using bribery or forgery to dull the vigilance of Romanian guards. In August, the head of Romanian Police in Bessarabia, Pavel Epure, asserted that whatever communists remained at large were "disoriented and paralyzed"—according to historian Piotr Șornikov, this assessment was correct, but mostly because PCM cadres had been informed of the massive defeats encountered by the Red Army. On 28 July, Romanian General Nicolae Ciupercă had issued an ultimatum to the local population, requiring all individuals engaged in underground activity to surrender or risk summary execution. Days after, General Nicolae Pălăngeanu reported increased attacks on Romanian troops and military convoys and ordered a combing of the villages and forests for "communist agents", indicating that those caught attacking the military should be shot. Repressive measures were then directed toward locals who assisted or sheltered paratroopers, while those who helped capture partisans were promised a reward of 10 to 25 thousand lei and land allotment.

Small-scale attacks on Romanian patrols and sabotages of the transport infrastructure were reported throughout August and September 1941 at Bender (Tighina), Buiucani, Rezina, Hotin County, with the first leading to an especially brutal retaliation: 5 villagers each from 17 settlements in the Bender area were shot as suspected partisans. On 6 October 1941, switchman I. Reilyanu caused two trains to collide with each other in Sipoteni. Six cars transporting military equipment were destroyed, killing five enemy soldiers and officers, and wounding eight other servicemen. Local groups were also reinforced by small airborne detachments sent by the Soviets. These detachments, which gathered intelligence and engaged in sabotage, were especially feared by Romanians as they were ready to fight to death in order to avoid capture. Examples include the group comprising N. F. Basko, L. M. Vnorovsky and N. P. Tsymbal, active around Briceni, and a group of nine led by Chișinău native G. Muntyan, active deep behind enemy lines, in Romania's Iași County. Surrounded by enemy troops after his group had been decimated, Muntyan committed suicide instead of surrendering.

Overall, during the early months of resistance, partisans suffered heavy losses fighting a superior enemy. Most groups and detachments had little experience with guerilla warfare, acted separately and many of the underground party organizations did not take any steps to coordinate their fight. More devastatingly from its perspective, the MSSR government in exile had lost all contact with partisan groups acting behind enemy lines. A group comprising Yury Korotkov, Iosif A. Bujor, Raisa Șafran and Maria Onufrienko was tasked with organizing a coordinating center in Chișinău, but the attempt to infiltrate them past the front line in mid-September 1941 ended in bloodshed. Another such attempt was organized by the Bureau of PCM's Central Committee, at the time residing in Donetsk, which selected nine veteran communists, both from the Bessarabian underground and the Soviet Moldavian administration, to create a clandestine republican party center. The group, led by A. M. Tereshchenko and Mikhail Skvortsov, was airdropped between the villages of Micăuți and Drăsliceni on 25 September, but it was quickly discovered and annihilated. Romanian documents indicate that until 1 October 1941, 48 parachuted partisans had been discovered, of whom 23 were captured alive, 11 were killed in action, and 14 escaped.

Throughout summer and autumn 1941, several underground communist organizations in Bessarabia were uncovered by the SSI, a success that is attributable to betrayal. Informants contributed to the destruction of partisan cells formed by Trikolich, Georgy Besedin, Anatoly Prokopets, and Shoil Rabinovich, with members either imprisoned or executed (see Capital punishment in Romania), and always tortured beforehand. At Corten, a member of the Bessarabian Bulgarian resistance cell crumbled under the psychological stress turned himself in, following which the local partisan leader, S. V. Malkov, was tried and executed. Other cases of betrayal and capture were attested throughout the former Moldavian SSR and the Budjak—in Bender, Budești, Cetatea Albă, Izmail, Tuzla. Partisan activity subsided after the fall of Odessa. According to historian Izeaslav Levit, regression was in part due to geographical factors: Bessarabia lacked the extensive forests found in other Soviet regions, and the Axis forces could easily clear the few existing ones. Consequently, between the autumn of 1941 and the end of 1943, the principal forms of resistance were anti-Romanian propaganda and sabotage, by underground groups acting locally.

=== "Invisible army" ===
The Red Army's successful blocking of the German offensive in the Battle of Moscow (October 1941–January 1942) provided an impulse for the re-activation of underground PCM cells. In Camenca area, the party organization led by Yakov Alekseyevich Kucherov succeeded in creating an extensive network of clandestine groups in the local villages, while in Tiraspol a new group, including communists and non-communists alike, was organized by Viktor S. Panin. By summer, new organizations were also created in Rîbnița and Grigoriopol. The former was itself a political mix, with 29 communists and 37 independents fighting side by side. The formation of underground cells was also followed in Bessarabia, though new groups established here during late 1941 and early 1942 were mainly formed by the Komsomol. Examples include partisans cells in Bender, Cahul (with branches in Găvănoasa, Moscovei and Musaitu), Chișinău, Slobozia, Soroca (with branches in Cotiujenii Mari, Cuhurești, Cunicea, Mîrzești and Vasilcău), as well as Zîrnești.

These would-be guerilla units soon began to build weapon caches by gathering materiel abandoned on the battlefields or by attacking Gendarmerie patrols. The Cahul group, whose leadership included Militsiya operative Pavel Polivod, was armed with a machine gun, fourteen rifles, 63 grenades, three machine-gun belts and 560 rounds of ammunition. The Slobozia organization had 9 rifles, 2 assault rifles, 1 sawn-off shotgun, while the Sîngerei group led by Vasile Jurjiu obtained 20 revolvers, one carbine and five rifles. A report by SSI director Eugen Cristescu, submitted to Antonescu in April 1942, noted that partisans were active mainly in Odessa (see Odesa Catacombs), but resistance activity was also mounted "throughout the rest of Transnistria, in Bessarabia, in Cahul and in Ukraine". In Cristescu's view, these constituted an "invisible army" consisting of two groups: an "active" one, which included partisan detachments and underground party cells, and a "passive" one reuniting the "communist-minded masses", both being equally dangerous to Romania's war effort. The SSI further reported in the summer of 1942 that individuals continued to join partisan groups "with the aim of committing terrorist acts" in spite of harsh sentences handed by the Chișinău martial court, with a group of 50 partisan having been recently discovered in southern Bessarabia. The main sources of volunteers and supporters for partisan activity were reported to be the poor and those who had held various positions under the Soviet administration.

Transnistria became especially prone to passive resistance. Although, in its early months, the governorate administration was able to recruit members among anti-Soviet but non-Romanian intellectuals, it acknowledged that the effort was fruitless among other social categories. Factory workers often kept in their houses portraits of Soviet leaders or Marxist works, university employees avoided engaging in mandatory anti-Soviet propaganda, and schoolchildren refused to learn prayers. Forms of sabotage also hampered the work of Anton Golopenția and other statisticians observing Romanian and Moldovan communities on that bank of the Dniester. Confronted with the "radicalized mindset in an area seriously tested by German military reprisals and requisitions", these research teams were armed with pistols. The effort was also hampered from within by communist statisticians such as Mihai Levente, who were in contact with the local partisans. They falsified records to include non-Romanians among those eligible for state assistance, or resold food parcels on the open market in order to fund the resistance.

Non-Jewish Transnistrians were also unlikely to engage in the persecution of Bessarabian Jewish deportees, with villagers in Butuceni sending food parcels to the ghetto in Rîbnița. Other forms of passive resistance were being simultaneously observed in Bessarabia: Chișinău's SSI reported the systematic destruction of Romanian posters, with newspapers sellers boycotting materials sent by the Ministry of Propaganda; a regimental commander stationed near the Dniester reported Bessarabians in general as being "under the influence of communist agents loyal to the Soviet regime". SSI reports also concentrated on the circulation of packaged goods wrapped in old Soviet newspapers, which they read as a coded signal to the communist underground.

Transnistrian officials were also vexed by the widespread cases of rape and other abuse by Romanian newcomers, which, they warned, could only "instigate to opposition against the liberators". In one case, 20 women were sexually abused by the gendarmes in the church of Ghidirim, as punishment for refusing to perform compulsory labor. This phenomenon was also observed by Selbstschutz units, staffed by Black Sea Germans, which declared themselves directly interested in preventing Romanian abuse; the airing of such accusations would lead to diplomatic incidents between the two Axis governments. The Selbstschutz were supported by Nazi officials as a tool for anti-partisan warfare, but were almost entirely consumed with "contest[ing] Romanian control of the Transnistrian countryside", provoking the Romanian Army with a number of shootouts and carjackings.

=== 1942 reorganization ===
In early 1942, the PCM leadership had withdrawn deep into Soviet territory, at Leninsk. Its Junior Secretary, Nikita Salogor, was able to outmaneuver party leader Piotr Borodin, and took over his offices ad interim. Consequently, Salogor also took up the task of organizing partisan units. Attempts to establish contacts with the clandestine organizations in the territories of the MSSR were however unsuccessful during the whole of 1942, and the groups continued to act without a central leadership. An effort to create a coordinated movement began only in June 1942 within the Central Headquarters of the Partisan Movement, answering to Stavka. The Headquarters sought to make use of hidden weapons and ammunition caches left behind during the previous Soviet retreat, and consequently designated Slobozia, Camenca, Tiraspol, Orhei, Bravicea and Hîncești as the main operation areas.

Already on 28 May the PCM adopted the resolution "On strengthening the partisan war behind the rear of the German invaders", which decided that at least 200 men were to be trained in special courses to become "commanders, commissars and chiefs of staff of partisan detachments", including "15–20 leading party and council workers". These were to be sent behind enemy lines within three to four months. A Moldovan department was consequently created in December 1942 under the Ukrainian Headquarters for the partisan movement, and, acting as the military section of the PCM Central Committee, it began recruiting and training personnel for partisan detachments, including preparations for their deployment. Leadership over that department was entrusted to Ivan Aleshin (or Alioșin), secretary of the PCM Central Committee.

Propaganda efforts were also stepped up during 1942: a Moldovan editorial office was established within the All-Union Radio in Moscow and began regular broadcasts in "Moldovan", the underground party organization in Camenca assembled a makeshift typography and printed eight leaflets distributed in the district and neighboring regions, groups in Tiraspol distributed leaflets ridiculing Antonescu and Hitler, while the ones in Cahul, Izmail, Sîngerei and Slobozia and Soroca generally used handwritten notes hung in public places. Written in Moldovan or Russian, the leaflets countered Romanian propaganda, quoted Sovinformburo cables, and deplored reversals of the Soviet land reform, describing as predatory the economic policies of Romanian bureaucrats, local capitalists, speculators, or landlords. PCM propaganda also addressed Romanian soldiers, calling on them to turn their weapons against the governments of Antonescu and Hitler. In some cases, propaganda was non-communist in nature or origin—as with Ivan Ganea and other students at Soroca Agricultural School, investigated in late 1942 for having distributed leaflets calling on Moldovans to prepare for the Red Army's victory, and for having denounced local branches of the Iron Guard.

Acts of sabotage also became more common in 1942. The SSI reported several actions against the Tiraspol oil and flour mills in the first half of the year. In February 1942, partisans set ablaze a German fuel depot in Bender railway station, destroying hundreds of oil barrels and 17 full and 13 partially full gasoline tank cars. Days later, a carriage with lubricating oil belonging to Romanian Army suffered the same fate. Rail infrastructure was a primary target during the summer: two train collisions occurred in early August in Etulia and Ungheni, a railway bridge linking Etulia to Vulcănești was destroyed on 26 August and two cars carrying fodder and military equipment were set on fire on 28 August between Chircăiești and Hagimus. Other attacks resulted in the destruction of an oil factory in Otaci, the meat processing plant in Chișinău, the electrical substations in Bălți and Soroca, and damage to depots in Tiraspol and Bulboaca.

Camenca's underground organization set fire to the stables and grain warehouse in Hristovaia, to a dried fruit storage facility at a former sovkhoz, and to warehouses of the local oil and cheese factories. In the rural areas of Bessarabia and Transnistria, common forms of resistance included delays in harvesting and refusal to deliver agricultural products, pay taxes or perform compulsory labor for the Romanian administration, leading a Romanian troop commander to call local peasants "unconscious and devoid of patriotism". In July 1942, 54 peasants from Bahmut were brought to trial for failing to report for work, and similar instructions were given to the police in Cahul after the military failed to mobilize local horses and carriages in August 1942. The local populace also supported Soviet prisoners of war interned across the region. During the winter of 1941–1942, they helped 70 POWs escape from the camp in Cubei. The SSI chief in Reni reported that a large crowd gathered at the local station in June 1942 as trains carrying Russian POWs passed through the town, offering various products, fruit and cigarettes to the prisoners before being dispersed by gendarmes. He described women "of Romanian descent" as among those showing support, and contrasted the events with the passing of a train carrying Romanians wounded at Sevastopol, when "not one Bessarabian Romanian soul" had shown up. Throughout summer 1942, the secret police reported instances of hostility towards the Romanian administration and appraisal of Soviet rule in the counties of Chișinău, Orhei and Soroca.

The counterinsurgency was directed mainly by the Gendarmerie; its agents, including Ovidiu Angelescu and Vasile Medvediuc, successfully spied on the partisans by going undercover. Police infiltration, along with a lack of experience in clandestine work, resulted in uncovering Komsomol organizations in Cahul and Izmail during spring 1942. Refusing to testify against fellow partisans, members of the Cahul organization managed to briefly escape the Chișinău military prison only to be re-captured. Its leaders (Cojocaru, Kavchuk, Polivod, Mikhail Krasnov, Timofey Morozov) were executed, one died during detention, and 41 other received various prison sentences. Two additional members of the group, Ivan Kravchenko and Ivan Maksimenko, made a last-minute escape, and survived in hiding until the war's end. Many youths involved with the Izmail group (including Gagauz Tamara Mumzhieva and Bulgarian Boris Feltev) also received life sentences, while five members of the organization in Hotin were executed. In November 1942, the gendarmes captured and prosecuted at Chișinău Israel N. Pecher and another 39 leaders of a pro-Soviet network that extended across the border between Bessarabia and Transnistria, and was allegedly created by the NKVD. Several localities, such as Tiraspol and Podoima, were included in this raid.

=== 1943 offensive ===
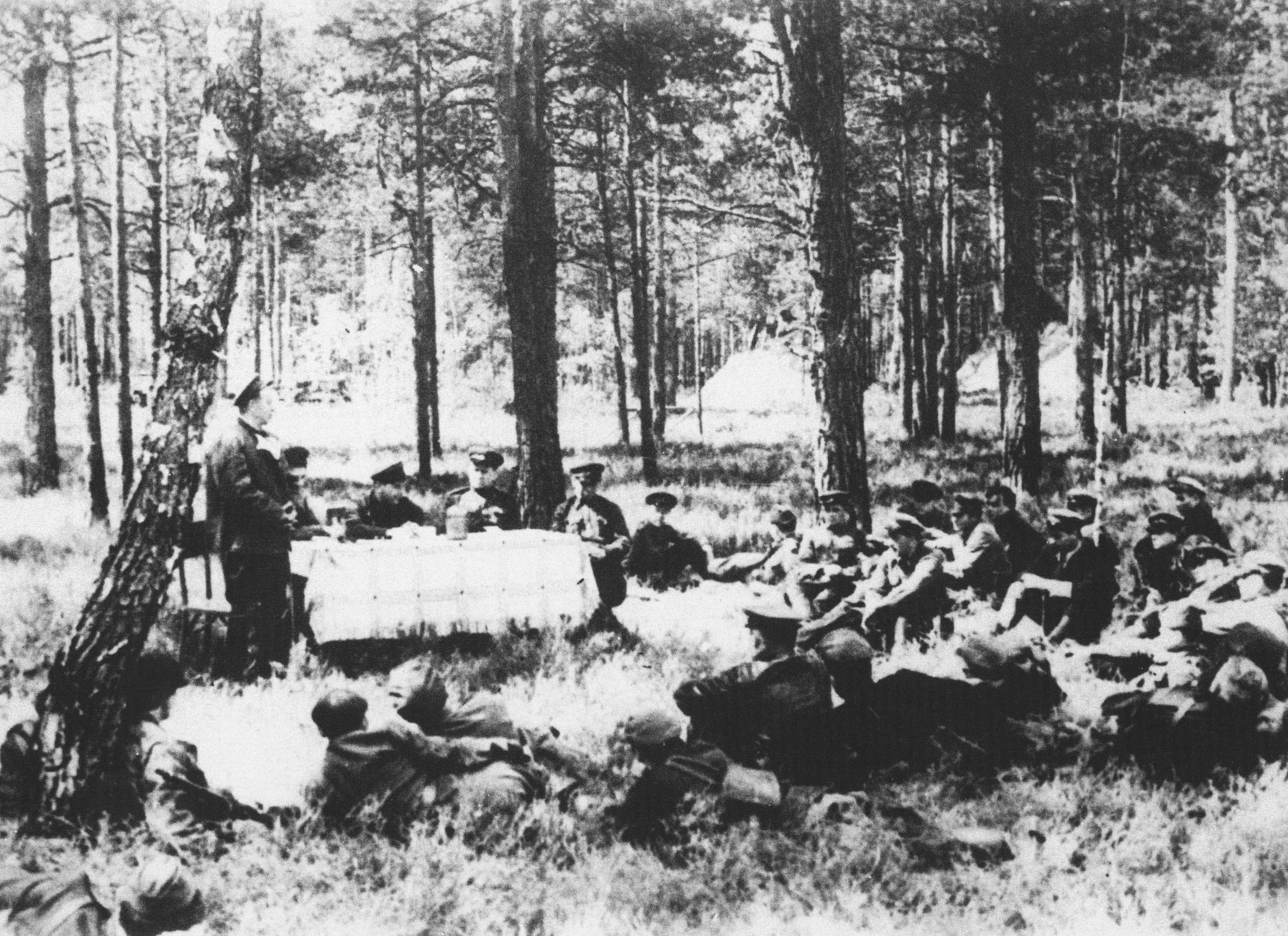
Partisan gathering in a forest outside Shitomir in 1943

During spring and summer 1943, the Moldovan department of the Ukrainian partisan headquarters made successive attempts to establish direct communication with the MSSR underground. As most of these failed, the PCM Central Committee obtained the Central Headquarters's consent to send its freshly-trained partisan groups to the areas of activity of the Ukrainian detachments, thus enabling them to gain actual combat experience before deployment in the republic. Therefore, the PCM-coordinated Moldovan partisan formations were only active in Ukrainian and Byelorussian areas throughout 1943. Commandant Pyotr Vershigora, himself a native of Transnistria, recalls meeting Moldovan partisans in Polesia, near Lelchytsy. According to Frolov, these groups engaged in hit-and-run attacks on the Wehrmacht, crossing the Horyn River during the Battle of Kursk.

Romania's evacuation of war booty from Transnistria following defeat at Stalingrad led to a surge in popularity for the communist underground, as reported in official Romanian documents. In Odessa, Tiraspol and other settlements near the Dniester clandestine organizations distributed increasing numbers of hand or type-written of leaflets reporting the progress of Soviet military operations and calling upon the population to hide livestock and grain, destroy bridges, and attack the occupation forces. In February 1943 Chișinău cell issued manifestos praising the Red Army, while calling on locals to create underground committees and self-protection groups; in March, leaflets distributed in Tiraspol called on POWs and those "capable of holding arms" to join the partisans. The Moldovan department of the Ukrainian partisans also printed new appeals, leaflets and information material in thousands of copies, airdropping them in Cahul, Lăpușna and Tighina counties. The Moldovan radio office also began broadcasting five times a day, under the heading "Moldova was and will be Soviet!", including a daily "Broadcast for partisans". Appeals were made to the Moldovan people to engage in sabotage and refuse to pay taxes or hand over agricultural products to the enemy. Chișinău's SSI mentioned that, as a result of Soviet propaganda, locals were negatively comparing the military administration with the Soviet one, and in effect sabotaging its efforts. By November, as reported by the Bălți County police, locally produced communist leaflets and appeals were commonly distributed even in the rural areas.

The turn of tides also created dissent within the Romanian and German army commands, as with General Ilie Șteflea—who sought to limit the number of Romanians engaged in the Kalmyk Steppe. According to Șteflea's own reports, he used Bender's quarantine facilities to withdraw 135,000 Romanians soldiers from the front lines, under the pretext that they were ailing. This sabotage coincided with the partisans' intervention to stop active recruitment. Since Stalingrad had depleted Romanian Army reserves, conscription extended to Bessarabia and Bukovina. In April 1943, Romania's attempt to set up a "Transnistrian Military Council" for attracting Moldovan volunteers was successfully countered by the underground group led by M. Skopenko in Tiraspol; after failing to recruit even a company, the council was dissolved by governor Gheorghe Alexianu.

Desertion was common among regional recruits, with 101 of the 189 mobilized Bessarabians fleeing an Odessa-bound train on 18 February 1943. The military courts attempted to curb this phenomenon by imposing harsh punishments on Moldovans who refused to "take the oath of fidelity": 25 years of hard labor with confiscation of property. In one instance, Romanian leader Antonescu even requested that, in case of mass desertions, every tenth defector should be shot in front of the troop. Throughout the year, the Bessarabian administration published lists with those who failed to report for conscription, with tens reported missing in various villages across the region and over 70 at Alexăndreni and Milești Mari. The ones actually drafted were moreover deemed unreliable, with Antonescu declaring in a cabinet meeting on 16 November 1943 that Bessarabians "do not want to fight" and "gravitate toward the Reds". According to Levit, part of them were sent to the Crimean front as "cannon fodder" in order to fulfill Hitler's requests for reinforcements, with their battalions positioned between German units in order to discourage flight. Bessarabians on the front line were also targeted by Soviet propaganda, which distributed leaflets calling on them to switch sides and join the Red Army and the partisans. Romanian POWs processed by the political department of the Soviet 51st Army reported that the Bessarabians were unwilling to fight and "half-openly" talked about surrender; in one instance, seven Bessarabians from an infantry battalion deserted and joined the Crimean partisans.

The number of clandestine groups also increased in the aftermath of Stalingrad: ten groups in Tiraspol and its suburbs (led by Prokofy Efimovich Kustov, V. S. Panin, and Nikolai Cheban), one in Soroca and nearby Iorjnița and Zastînca (led by G. M. Gumenny), three in Dubăsari, a Komsomol organization in Ungheni (led by V. N. Gavrisha) and several rural groups (in Cuhurești and Nicolaevca, Crihana Nouă, Moara de Piatră, Novocotovsc, Sofia, Șerpeni and others). At Dunduc, minority Lipovans under M. M. Chernolutsky established permanent links with the main partisan network. Various groups were gradually able to extend their contacts and coordinate their activities across wider areas, with partisans in Camenca, Dubăsari, Rîbnița, Soroca and Tiraspol collaborating with Ukrainian units active around Balta, Kodyma, Kryzhopil and Pishchanka, trying to obtain weapons and ammunition from the latter. During the second half of 1943, the organization in Cernăuți, Bukovina, established contacts with the groups active in Chișinău, Bălți and Soroca, while communist partisans in Camenca and Grigoriopol sent representatives near the front line in an effort to contact the PCM Central Committee.

Sabotage also intensified, including the derailment of an aviation fuel train at Bender in March 1943 and three burning down of three warehouses in Tiraspol, two of which had housed war booty. More arson attacks were reported in May by Chișinău's Regional Police Inspectorate: a state-owned sunflower oil refinery in Otaci was burned down, with simultaneous fires occurring in Izvoare, Albineț, Chirileni, Glodeni, Sculeni, Rîșcani, Pîrlița and Năvîrneț in Bălți County. The same report also attributed to communist activity the sinking of Izmail and Mihai Viteazul ships, operating on the Danube. The SSI reported that, by October 1943, sabotage had halved the number of steam locomotives in operation from Basarabeasca railway yard, while those still available needed to be repaired constantly; in November, another train collision was reported in Zaim. The Bender police reported several partisan attacks in Transnistria during the same period, including one targeting the Dubăsari barracks and one the communication lines in Doroțcaia. Instigated by the Camenca communist committee, agricultural workers distributed hundreds of quintals of harvested corn and wheat to locals, instead of delivering them to the administration, hid twenty tractors set for evacuation to Romania, and managed to sow 4,256 hectares of winter wheat—despite a ban on such practices being imposed by Romanian authorities.

With the Red Army now on the offensive, Salogor called on Nikolai Mikhailovich Frolov, a seasoned participant in Komsomol resistance, to take up command over Bessarabian partisan troops. As Frolov reports, no such units actually existed at that stage, mainly because "hostile elements" and "Boyar Romania" held the region in full control. The effort to land partisan commanders directly into Bessarabian territory was hampered by the region's compactness and lack of suitable airfields. It was additionally delayed when commissar F. F. Bondar broke his leg as he was parachuted on the Bessarabian border; he was replaced by Anisim Gavrilovich Druchin. "Grigore Kotovski" was the first successfully organized guerilla detachment. Created and led by Molovata native Makar Kozhukhar, it absorbed into its ranks escapees from Nazi concentration camps, but was originally located outside Bessarabia—in the Shitomir sector of Reichskommissariat Ukraine. In June 1943, colonel Vasily Andreyev (or Andreev), a history teacher, set up the first partisan formation by connecting the Kotovski detachment with two other such groups: "For a Soviet Moldavia" and "Mikhail Frunze". Other commanders of this formation included Aleshin and PCM activist Gherasim Rudi. Some Moldovan-designated groups also participated in an attack on Shepetivka railway station, in Reichskommissariat Ukraine, during September 1943; these reportedly killed some 2,000 Germans.

=== Renewed clampdown ===
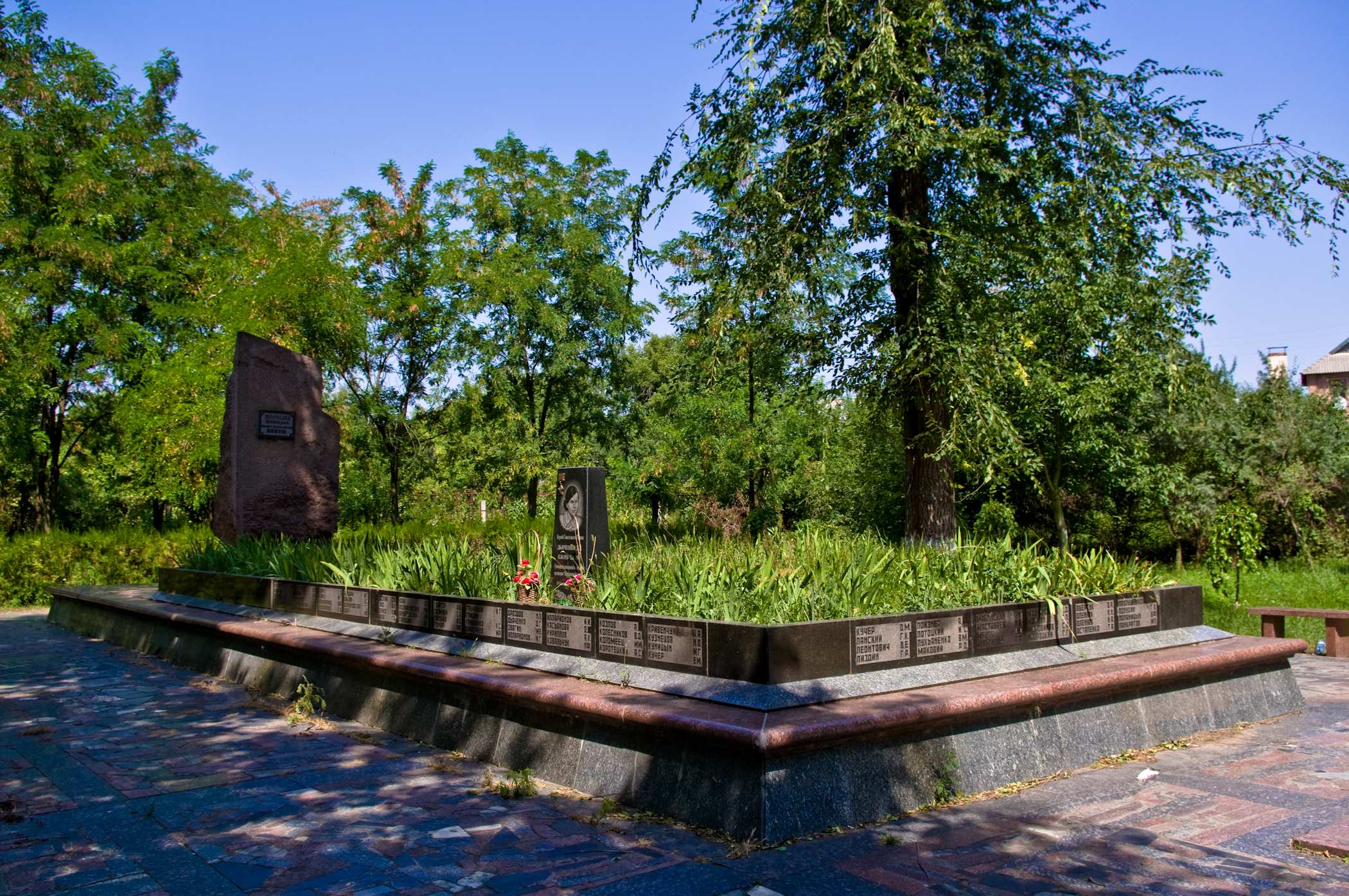
Memorial to the Victims of Fascism, Tiraspol

After the assault on Crimea in early 1943, a Romanian Army counterintelligence group, "Informational Center B", was moved to Tiraspol and began the hunt for Soviet partisans in the surrounding region. One early success came by accident, when Romanian sappers in Dubăsari discovered Dmitry Nadvodsky's partisans attempting to obtain access to their weapons' cache; this led to a temporary suspension of resistance activity in that town. In May 1943, Nadvodsky's group was infiltrated by gendarme spies, which resulted in the arrest of several key partisans. Nadvodsky then attempted to divert attention by staging attacks on the strategic bridge at Criuleni. Gheorghe Viziteu, at the time a young gendarme in Lăpușna County, reports being told by his superiors that "the forests of Bessarabia and Transnistria [were] packed full" (bucșite) of "communist partisans". He attributed their presence to daily reinforcements by Soviet paratroopers and airdropped supplies, as well as noting the mass desertions from a penal military unit, namely the Sărata Rehabilitation Battalion. Viziteu recalls participating in retaliatory actions, during which captives were rounded up for imprisonment at Hîncești.

Romanian officials further targeted those peasants who refused to assist the administration: in September 1943 the pretor of Grigoriopol decided to intern in labor camps ten locals who had refused to provide their carts for military use, while a week later a large group of peasants from Coșnița was imprisoned. In Bessarabia, by September many civilians accused of passive resistance ended up in the Friedenstal camp, including 138 from Borogani, 34 from Iargara, 38 from Lărguța, 15 from Capaclia and 170 from Beșghioz. The SSI remarked in a report dated 30 November 1943 that the pro-Soviet propaganda was extensively distributed throughout Bessarabia and it began to attract "people who, although they are not supporters of communist ideas, act against" the Romanian administration, persuading locals to join partisan groups.

Counting 3,000 in 1943, the total number of partisans swelled up to 3,900 by 1944. Resistance grew more defiant: on 9 September 1943, Veniamin Rybchak, Adam Marjină and Georgy Gasner produced a massive red flag embroidered in white with the acronym "СССР" ("USSR"). This was flown over the Labor Exchange in downtown Chișinău, and only taken down when Romanians could be sure that it had not been booby trapped. However, all three participants gave themselves away during the spectacle, and were dispatched to a labor camp in Onești. In November, after attacking a train in Crujopol, Kucherov found himself arrested, but his Camenca group was revived by M. Ya. Popovsky and E. A. Vershigora. From December, Kustov and his deputy K. I. Vozniuk began preparing for a major partisan action in support of the advancing Red Army. They obtained backing from the heads of local industries, and increased the pace at which POWs were helped to escape from the local camps. Kustov's group also plotted an attempt on Antonescu's life, when the latter visited Tiraspol. By January 1944, the Grigoriopol branch was holding meetings out in the open, and similarly preparing to go on the offensive; it also assisted fugitives from POW camps as they attempted to join the Ukrainian partisans. Eventually, however, Kustov's entire network was captured by the gendarmes, who submitted prisoners to various forms of torture. Following the backlash at Tiraspol, Panin was able to escape and hide with several of his comrades at Sucleia.

Confronted with the repeated failures of more combative organizations, Iosif Bartodzy set up a more secretive, pan-Moldovan, network at Chișinău. This "Inter-District Organization" was also penetrated by SSI men in January 1944, resulting in Bartodzy's own arrest and torture. He survived by inventing stories of a "Bessarabian regional committee", which the SSI believed, but which proved largely immaterial to the investigation. Left permanently disabled by his interrogators, Bartodzy was finally sentenced to hard labor for creating an "illegal organization"; the same verdict was pronounced against ten of his colleagues. In other areas of the former MSSR, the SSI and related organizations staged similar roundups. The OBUS group, with members in Otaci and Arionești, attempted to derail a German ammunition train on 22 February, but withdrew under pressure from the gendarmes. At Bender, partisan leaders Nikolai Kalashnikov and Vladimir Lungu could obtain pledges of support from three low-ranking officers serving in the Romanian Army, and organized a movement to sabotage the harvest. Kalashnikov found himself arrested on 29 December 1943; his entire ring of supporters was then exposed by the SSI. Gumenny and Jurjiu's networks were also slowly neutralized by policemen, once they "began to pose a direct threat to the occupying power". During March 1944, policemen were also able to quell partisan agitation in Parcani, where they uncovered a group that had attempted to join up with the Kotovski detachment.

While reorganizing their territorial network, the Romanian police and Gendarmerie succeeded in capturing 600 partisans between 1942 and 1944, most of whom were incarcerated at Chișinău, Tiraspol, Rîbnița and Dubăsari. Tiraspol's camp total population in mid 1943 was 1,500, not all of whom were originally partisans. However, these organized themselves into a distinct resistance cell, organizing escapes which fed the partisan movement in Transnistria. As counted by historian Anton Moraru, Romanians or Germans killed 238 partisans at a prison in Rîbnița in March 1944, and 600 in Tiraspol; victims of the former massacre included Kucherov. Especially in Bessarabia, Romanian prison authorities were alarmed by the looming threat of Antonescu's regime collapsing, and proceeded with some leniency. Though tortured and sentenced to death, Kalashnikov, Jurjiu and others were never executed. Several transfers out of Tiraspol were ordered by the Romanian authorities, but, in late March, the camp was transferred to a German unit, which staged daily shootings over several days. This prompted a prisoners' revolt, as a result of which 230 people managed to hide with civilians in Tiraspol and the surrounding villages. Just before withdrawing from the city, a punitive unit killed 16 of the 18 partisans still held in captivity, including Kustov.

The death count at Rîbnița is given by scholar Dennis Deletant as 215, and includes Jewish members of the Romanian Communist Party who had been jailed there alongside partisans and Soviet parachutists. He similarly notes that some 60 partisans were led away before the massacre, and therefore survived. A Romanian communist, Belu Zilber, claimed in his memoirs that he successfully pleaded with Antonescu himself to release Jewish party members from Vapniarka in Transnistria, noting that they were in danger of being mass murdered by the retreating Germans. When asked to explain himself by the party leadership, Zilber purportedly replied: "Had there been any partisans in Romania, perhaps I would have given some thought to storming the camp. Had I though it over a bit longer, I would have given up on this plan, as it would have resulted in a general massacre."

=== Final battles ===
The Moldavian SSR in March–August 1944, showing front line and anti-/pro-Soviet resistance centers

Meanwhile, in January–March 1944, PCM groups under Yakov Shkryabach faced off with the Ukrainian Insurgent Army in Rivne Oblast. General Vasily Andrianov notes that, at roughly the same time, "two large Moldavian partisan formations" under Andreyev and Shkryabach attempted but failed to reach Bessarabia. As a result, the operational groups were broken into detachments of 20–30 fighters. The Red Army ultimately recovered the MSSR's northern half during the Dnieper–Carpathian Offensive. On 18 March, partisan units crossed the Dniester from Podolia. Forcing Moldovans to supply them with boats and provisions, they captured Soroca ahead of the regular troops. In tandem, other units emerged to assist the Red Army in Transnistria. Nadvodsky's unit helped with the takeover in Rîbnița, while the Udalov group participated in the battle for Camenca.

As noted by soldier Neculai Caba, during the late days of March, partisans around Chișcăreni were able to persuade virtually all the Bessarabians in Romania's 8th Redcoats Regiment (up to a fourth of its manpower) to surrender or join up with them. After Soviet troops took over the north of Bessarabia, former partisan detachments were tasked with requisitioning. Between April and June 1944, detachments led by Andreyev and Rudi seized 400 horses and carriages from the local population around Soroca. In this context, Moldovan peasants' resistance to food quotas imposed by the Romanian Army mutated into anti-Soviet resistance, attributed by MSSR authorities to "adverse kulak elements". During May 1944, anti-Soviet partisans staged attacks in places such as Ochiul Alb and Ciulucani; the PCM argued that they were stay-behind members of the National Christian Party and the Iron Guard.

As a result of the Red Army's push south from Soroca, the number of Soviet loyalists active behind enemy lines had dropped to 946 in April 1944. As noted by Șornikov, the partisan movement failed in its goal of steering a pro-Soviet popular revolt, mainly because most able-bodied in Romanian-held areas had been conscripted for labor duty, while "the cities of Bessarabia were flooded with German and Romanian troops". At that stage, Center B had followed the Fourth Army as it withdrew from Tiraspol to Iași. Centers B and H divided their areas of operation in southern Bessarabia, with the former notionally active north of Orhei and Vorniceni.

Beginning in January 1944, the Red Army's counterintelligence, or SMERSH, infiltrated Chișinău to uncover Center H's network of spies. Escaping detention, Rybchak and Marjină regained Chișinău and proceeded to destroy German lines of communication. The SSI grew aware of this, and sent in an informant; the cell was neutralized and its members were dispatched to a Romanian prison in Galați. Some other partisans were attested in Center H's area, in forests around Ciuciuleni. In summer 1944, they reportedly assassinated the gendarmes of Dahnovici and Cojușna. As reported by Mina Dobzeu, then living as an Orthodox monk at Hâncu, workers on the monastery site actively assisted the resistance, which put monks at risk of retaliation by the Romanian authorities. Several of his colleagues were interrogated by the Romanian authorities, and a Brother Clement was shot, under the mistaken assumption that he was armed.

In July–August 1944, just ahead and during the major Soviet push into Bessarabia, six partisan detachments were airdropped behind Romanian lines and proceeded to recruit among locals. All operations ceased following King Michael's Coup of 23 August: Romania joined the Allied Powers, and Center B was moved to assist the Red Army in Northern Transylvania. By October, Soviet authorities in Chișinău began prosecuting Moldovans identified as members of the Center H network. Three women, including a former NKVD agent, were arrested for having "identified Soviet parachutists and partisans." Viziteu recalls hiding his real identity from the Red Army, which captured him as a prisoner of war. His past was uncovered by NKVD interrogators, and, while cleared of all allegations of war crimes and allowed to return to Romania, he was socially marginalized. Before 1946, Iosif Mordoveț, as head of the Moldovan SMERSH, issued formal accusations against Orthodox monks, depicting them as collaborators with the Romanians and as engaged in the hunt for partisans. This contributed to the decision of liquidating all monasteries in 1949. Also in 1949, Avram Bunaciu obtained that the Romanian Communist Party be purged of all members who could be said to have participated in anti-partisan activity during the previous decade.

== Legacy ==
=== Impact and depictions ===
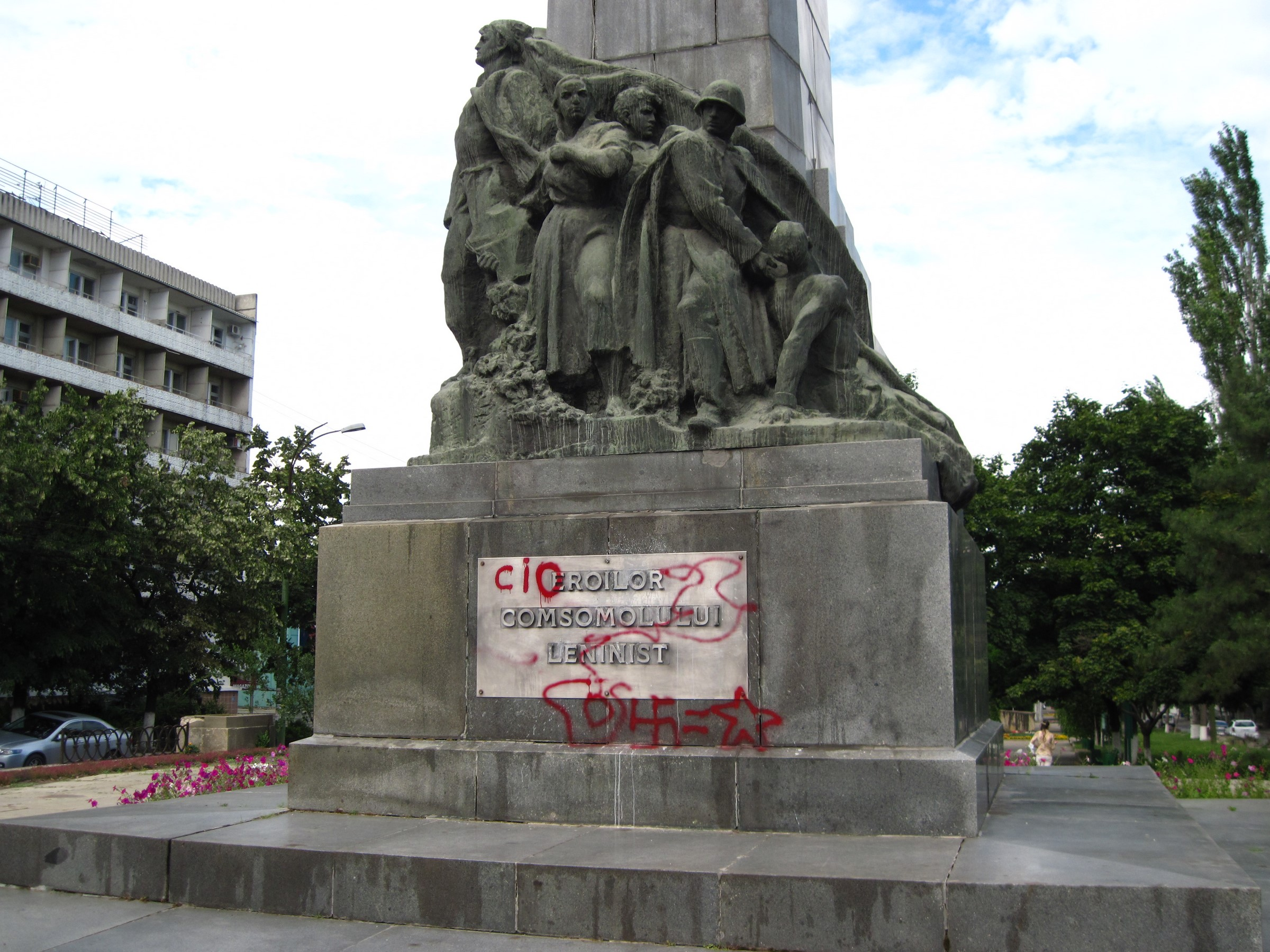
Monument to Komsomol resistance heroes in Chișinău, defaced by anti-communist graffiti

According to Moraru, some forty separate groups were active, at one time or another, directly against the Romanian military and civilian administration, while Levit provides the same figure for the end of 1943. Șornikov counts "60 underground organizations and groups operating in Moldova", while noting that thirty of these could only have been formed in 1943. Overall, during 1943–1944, partisan detachments participated in 39 military operations, destroying four ammunition depots, four fuel depots, an electrical substation, a post office and 23 barracks. 277 train cars carrying troops, ammunition and military equipment were derailed as a result of the activity of the 1st Moldavian Partisan Unit. Other detachments succeeded in damaging 271 locomotives, 2,160 train cars, 185 motor vehicles, eleven airplanes, four armored cars and other military equipment. The partisans managed to neutralize 14,000 enemy soldiers and officers and captured 400 weapons, eight pieces of artillery, twelve military trucks, 160 horses and 2,000 head of cattle. By 1944, in Bessarabia-proper, 5,000 propaganda leaflets had been distributed.

During the closing phases of World War II, Moldovan refugee writers related the fight of the partisans with historical instances of resistance by the local population. Thus, Ion Canna presented the Moldavian forests as a place of refuge for both the partisans and the hajduks who had historically fought boyar abuses, while Bogdan Istru compared Moldovans fighting for the Soviet cause with the "archers of Stephen III of Moldavia", who had fought in the 15th century "against Teutons, Ottomans, Hungarians, Tatars, and Wallachians"—a symbolic reference to the Axis countries. As noted by analyst Wim van Meurs, later Soviet Moldovan authors depicted partisans as the final component of a Bessarabian revolutionary tradition leading back to early Narodniki, whereas Soviet historiography in general frowned upon this pedigree. Van Meurs writes that both schools of though converged on the need to gloss over a significant issue: "There was a significant lack of heroic events and appealing results in the fighting of the military men and the partizans [sic] on Moldavian territory."

In Soviet culture, the legend surrounding Moldovan partisans was enhanced by the 1940 song Smuglyanka, which became popular from 1942. Though written about a Bessarabian girl in the Russian Civil War of 1918–1921, it became generally understood as a reference to the Moldovan guerilla of the 1940s. An April 1945 exhibit in Chișinău already featured portraits and compositions by Moisei Gamburd, which depicted various Moldovan partisans. Accounts about the real-life Bessarabian fighter Boris Glavan appear in Alexander Fadeyev's novel, The Young Guard. During the latter 1950s, the PCM promoted narratives about Glavan and another individual combatant, Ion Soltyz, along with increasingly "absurd claims" about the Moldovans' willingness to fight for the Red Army. Glavan had in fact fought and died in Ukrainian territory, while Soltyz's celebrated self-sacrifice had occurred in April 1945.

Although a Glavan Prize was awarded annually by the Moldovan Komsomol, commemorations of partisan service remained scarce, and historical works on the movement were delayed until the 1960s, when Simion Afteniuc published the first monograph. This was followed by a series of stories in popular magazines, with Andreyev and several other participants in the movement also leaving memoirs detailing their roles. As noted by historian Volodymyr Kovalchuk, documented clashes between Moldovan units and the Ukrainian Insurgent Army were almost never mentioned in such accounts. In 1968, the official textbook of MSSR history made a point of specifically indicating that the adversaries were Romanians, rather than unnamed "fascist conquerors". It also acknowledged that Moldovan partisans had been few in numbers.

This image was further revised by authors writing after the dissolution of the Soviet Union. As observed by historian Svetlana Suveică, the partisan cult survived in both the breakaway Pridnestrovian Moldavian Republic and autonomous Gagauzia, with Șornikov and Stepan S. Bulgar as its chief proponents. She notes that the latter also exaggerated the scale of Gagauz resistance to Romanian rule, producing a "politicised and biased" textbook. Following documents published by the German Wehrmacht and Ukrainian historians, Moraru characterizes the partisan formations as a "subversive movement, of espionage and terror"; he considers that their actions go against "international human rights" and "are identical to political and military terrorism". Moraru contrasts his view with that of "Russian and Russified" historians, such as Levit, Dumitru Elin, Aleksandr Korenev, V. Kovalenko, Nikolai Berezniakov, A. Durakov and Petru Boico, who have acclaimed the partisan movement. The same terminology is used by Romanian historian Valeriu Avram, who calls pro-Soviet resistance groups "NKVD terrorists". Similarly, Dobzeu refers to the partisans as "Soviet spies [and] diversionists", but assesses that, by 1944, Romanian troops were "no longer the benefactors."

=== Ethnic representation ===
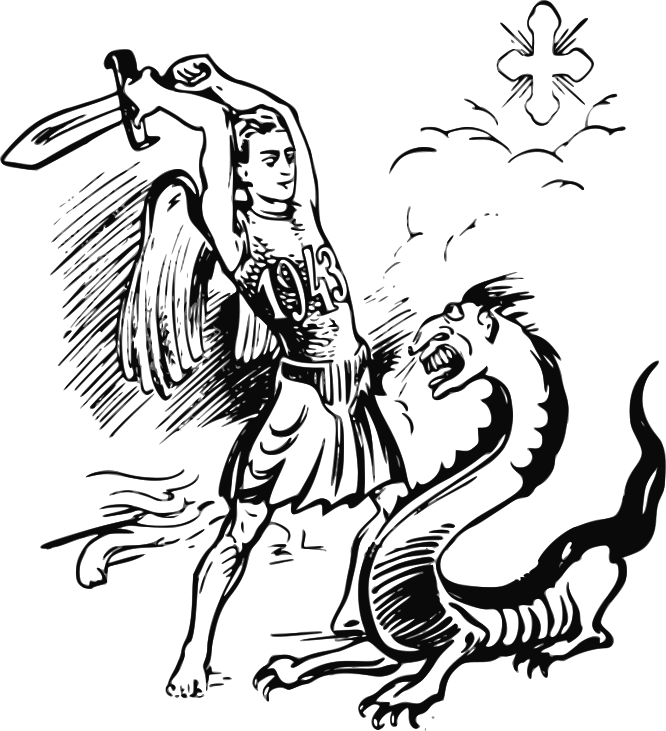
The Archangel Michael defeating the dragon of Jewish Bolshevism, in a Transnistrian Romanian cartoon aimed at Russian speakers (1 January 1943)

Moraru asserts that the PCM "represented the interests of the non-Romanian, non-Moldovan population", with partisan detachments made up of "Russians, Ukrainians, Belarusians, and other nationalities"; he counts only twenty "Russified" Moldovans among the active participants. He also claims that 16,000 "Romanians, soldiers, officers and civilian population" were killed by "the terrorists". Van Meurs notes the "almost complete absence of ethnic Moldavian heroes", and suggests that Joseph Stalin had wanted it this way: "Stalin had distrusted people in newly acquired territories and particularly if they would have to confront their ethnic kin in war such as Moldavians with Romanians. As a result, many Moldavians had been deported in 1940–1941 or were forced to labor in the factories way behind the actual front lines. Only a small number of Moldavian soldiers were deployed on what was called 'the other fronts of the Soviet Union'." Various records suggest that, in Bessarabia (as opposed to Transnistria), Moldovan peasants and urbanites were often eager participants in anti-Soviet reprisals, which often doubled as pogroms against Jews. Moldovans who took active measures against the partisans included Grigore and Vasile Coval—respectively, the father and brother of PCM leader Nicolae Coval. This matter was brought up by Salogor during the inner-party struggles of 1946.

The cosmopolitan traits of the partisan movement are discussed by Frolov, himself non-Moldovan (Russian), in terms of Soviet patriotism: "The multinational Soviet family [was] fighting against the Nazi invaders for the honor, freedom and independence of their motherland." Overall, "the ambiguous phrase 'sons of the Moldavian people' was generally used to cover the fact that most of the heroes were of a Ukrainian or Russian origin." Șornikov highlights the ill-preparedness of the PCM by noting that, of the Tereshchenko–Skvortsov group, not one could converse in standardized Moldovan; the only native speaker was a P. I. Muntean, who had only mastered a Transnistrian Romanian dialect. This policy was partly amended in 1944, when Bartodzy's "Inter-District Organization" acquired a representative basis, comprising "59 Moldovans, 20 Ukrainians, 13 Russians, [and] 2 Jews."

In some cases, Soviet literature describe the semi-nomadic Romani people as active participants in the Moldovan resistance—when, in fact, Romanies were generally victims of Antonescu's mass deportations. In 1942, Moscow's Romen Theatre ran benefit shows for the Red Army, including On the Banks of the Dniester River. It "tells the story of the Romani female partisan unit that fought against the Nazis in Transnistria." The 1946 edition of Fadeyev's novel depicts Boris Glavan as a Romani man from Tiraspol, and his name is misspelled as "Glavani"; this is corrected for the 1951 print, which suggests that Glavan was a Moldovan from Soroca. Later research identified his place of birth as Țarigrad, which came to house a monument in his honor.

Another young Moldovan communist was Anatol Corobceanu, who saw action as a partisan in Byelorussia. From 1963, he served as Soviet Moldova's Minister of Culture, but was sidelined in 1970 for having reverted to Romanian nationalism. In some cases, partisans were Moldovans drafted into the Red Army in 1940, then trained and airdropped back behind enemy lines; Viziteu recalls capturing one such partisan in 1944. As noted by historian Gheorghe Nicolaev, 70% of wartime memorials in Soviet Moldova are for Red Army servicemen "mobilized [...] despite holding Romanian citizenship"; Bessarabian Bulgarians and the Gagauz were excluded from the draft. The remaining 30% of commemorative landmarks honor partisans, but also signal tombs of soldiers, aviator deaths, or the Red Army as a generic entity. Nicolaev cites a verdict by fellow researcher Veaceslav Stăvilă, according to whom Bessarabian conscripts were used as "cannon fodder". These factors also contributed to the emerging anti-communist resistance, with 4,321 Moldovans deserting from the Red Army in April–August 1944.

Romanian occupation authorities had mostly worried about the spread of resistance through ethnic minority groups, but concluded that Bessarabian Ukrainians were mostly indifferent, rather than openly hostile. In 1943–1944, field agents also noted with satisfaction that pro-Soviet minorities such as the Gagauz and Bulgarians were more cooperative, and that Greater Romania was coming to be seen as the better option. At a very early stage in the war, Antonescu had entertained the notion that opposition to Romanian rule would mostly come from Jewish Bolshevism, and this served as a justification to his attempt at exterminating Bessarabia's Jews; Jews from Romania-proper were viewed as assimilated, and as such generally spared. In October 1941, Antonescu publicly justified his mass deportation and selective extermination of Jews as an anti-partisan measure, noting that Romanian troops had seized "14–15-year-old Jewish children with pockets full of grenades". This view was subsequently embraced by some pro-Romanian intellectuals in Bessarabia, including Elena Alistar. As interpreted by Șornikov, "the public nature of the massacres perpetrated against Jews attested as to the invaders' intention of intimidating Moldovans, Russians, Ukrainians, and other residents of Bessarabia."

During the actual formation of partisan units, the PCM recommended against recruiting Jews, as they were explicitly targeted for execution by the Romanians. However, this did not prevent the PCM from still sending in Jewish paratroopers throughout 1941 and 1942, suggesting to Șornikov that the party had failed to grasp the extent of antisemitic violence in Bessarabia and Transnistria. In the latter region, Jews became divided between those who collaborated with the Antonescu regime and those who fought against occupation: the Judenrat formed at Rîbnița was opposed by Nikolai L. Duvidzon and his Komsomol underground, who also sabotaged transports of grain from Ukraine to Romania. Bartodzy, who established Chișinău's partisan command in January 1944, was a Transylvanian Jew, born Raul Veltman. In order to penetrate the Bessarabian and Transnistrian administration, he passed himself off as an ethnic Romanian.

According to Levit, subsequent Soviet censorship only allowed limited mention of Jews as fighters against the occupiers. Historian Vladimir Solonari argues this was caused by the Soviet regime's general mistrust toward Jews and its reluctance to shed light on antisemitism in Soviet territory. In 1944, the French Resistance commemorated its "Bessarabian heroes", a category which included Olga Bancic. As noted by historian Mihai Burcea, many of those covered by this nomenclature were left-wing Jews who refused to identify with an "imperialistic" Greater Romania. In his 1951 memoir L'homme qui voyagea seul, Romanian French exile Constantin Virgil Gheorghiu viewed the vast majority of Bessarabia's stay-behind partisans as Jews, and claimed to have collected evidence of this, such as their identity papers. This account sparked controversy in the West, particularly since Gheorghiu accused Jewish partisans of war crimes such as setting fire to Bălți city in 1941.
