= Gherasim Rudi =

Moldavian SSR politician (1907–1982)

- Герасим Рудь
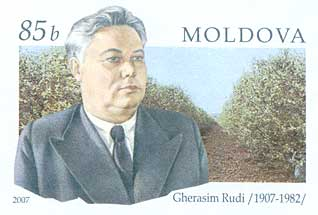
- 2007 Moldovan stamp featuring Rudi

Chairman of the Council of Ministers of the Moldavian SSR
- In office 5 January 1946 – 23 January 1958
- Preceded by: Nicolae Coval (as Chairman of the Council of People's Commissars of the Moldavian SSR)
- Succeeded by: Alexandru Diordiță

1st Minister of Foreign Affairs of the Moldavian SSR
- Premier: Tihon Konstantinov; Nicolae Coval
- Succeeded by: Alexandru Diordiță

Personal details
- Born: 4 March 1907 Sărăței, Podolia Governorate, Russian Empire (now Moldova)
- Died: 26 June 1982 (aged 75) Chișinău, Moldavian SSR, Soviet Union (now Moldova)
- Party: Communist Party of Moldova

Gherasim Rudi (4 March 1907 – 26 June 1982) also Russified as Gerasim Yakovlevich Rud (Note: In this name that follows East Slavic naming customs, the patronymic is Yakovlevich and the family name is Rud.) (Russian: Герасим Яковлевич Рудь) was a Moldavian SSR politician and member of the Moldovan resistance during World War II.

Rudi was born in Sărăței, Rîbnița District. He died on 26 June 1982, in Chișinău. Rudi was the Prime Minister of Moldavian SSR (5 January 1946 – 23 January 1958); until 4 April, the name was Chairmen of the Council of People's Commissars. Rudi signed the ruling concerning the deportation of more than 40,000 of Bessarabian Romanians to Siberia in the summer of 1949. The operation was undertaken by the NKVD, under the order of Joseph Stalin, on 6 June 1949 and was known as the operation "Iug" (South). After retirement he was a Rector of the Chisinau Agricultural Institute.

== Bibliography ==
- Chișinău-enciclopedie (1997)

== Notes ==
Political offices
Preceded by Nicolae Coval	Chairman of the Council of Ministers of the Moldavian SSR; 5 January 1946 – 23 January 1958	Succeeded by Alexandru Diordiță
