= Moldavia Regional Committee of the Communist Party of Ukraine =

The Moldavia Regional Committee of the Communist Party of Ukraine (Romanian: Comitetul Regional Moldova al Partidului Comunist din Ucraina; Ukrainian: Молдавський обласний комітет Комуністичної партії (більшовиків) України, romanized: Moldavs'kyy oblasnyy komitet Komunistychnoyi partiyi (bil'shovykiv) Ukrayiny), commonly referred to as the Moldavia CPU obkom, was the position of highest authority in the Moldavian ASSR, in the Ukrainian SSR of the Soviet Union.

The position was established on 15 October 1924 by former members of the former Soviet puppet state Bessarabian Socialist Soviet Republic. After an unsuccessful attempt to establish the Bessarabian Socialist Soviet Republic soon after World War I. The position was known as a responsible secretary of Orgbureau of the Communist Party of Ukraine for the Moldavian ASSR until 21 December 1924. In 1924–1932 it was known as a responsible secretary of the Moldavia Regional Committee. Upon occupation of the Romanian Bessarabia on 14 August 1940, the position was reorganized as part of the separate Communist Party of the Moldavian SSR.

The First Secretary was a de facto appointed position usually by the Central Committee of the Communist Party of Ukraine or the First Secretary of that party.

== List of First Secretaries of Moldavia Regional Committee of the Communist Party of Ukraine ==
Name	Term of Office		Life years
Name	Start	End	Life years
Responsible Secretaries of the Oblast Committee of the Communist Party
Iosif Badeev	15 October 1924	27 December 1928	1880–1937
Haim Bogopolski	27 December 1928	25 February 1930	1891–1937
Ilia Ilin	9 April 1930	2 October 1931	1893–1973
Ivan Placinda	2 October 1931	3 July 1932	1898–1937
First Secretaries of the Oblast Committee of the Communist Party
Ivan Sirko	3 July 1932	5 June 1933	1900–1976
Gurgen Bulat	5 June 1933	28 August 1935	1900–1949
Zinovie Siderski	28 August 1935	17 May 1937	1897–1938
Vladimir Todres	17 May 1937	30 August 1937	1897–1959
Nicolea Golub (acting)	30 August 1937	23 May 1938	1905–19??
Vladimir Borisov	23 May 1938	26 February 1939	1901–1984
Aleksei Melnikov	26 February 1939	6 August 1939	1900–1967
Pyotr Borodin	6 August 1939	14 August 1940	1905–1986

== See also ==
- Moldavian ASSR

== Sources ==
- at www.worldstatesmen.org
