= Tihon Konstantinov =

Soviet Moldovian politician (1898–1957)

- Тихон Константинов
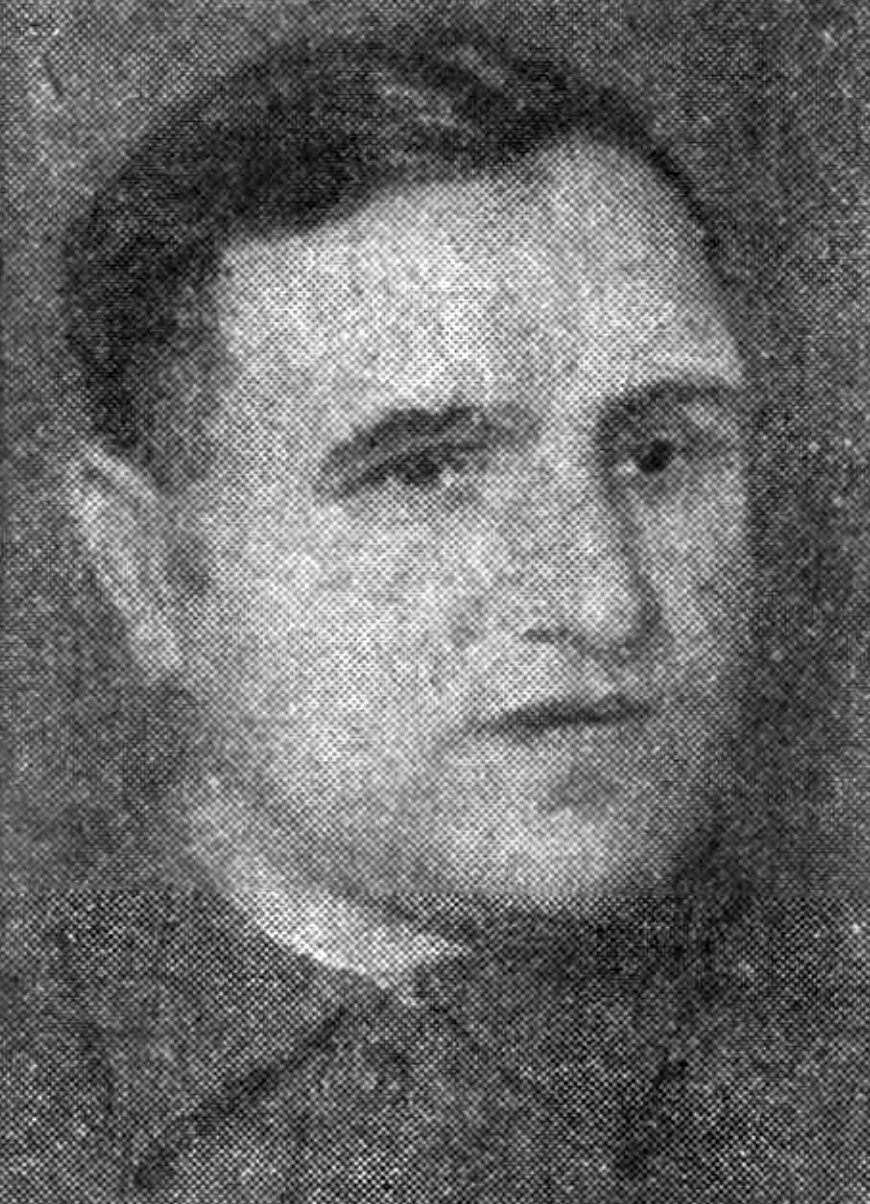
- Konstantinov in 1938

1st Chairman of the Council of People's Commissars of the Moldavian SSR
- In office 2 August 1940 – 17 April 1945
- Succeeded by: Nicolae Coval

Personal details
- Born: 13 August 1898 Khoroshoye, Yekaterinoslav Governorate, Russian Empire (now Khoroshe, Alchevsk Raion, Luhansk Oblast, Ukraine)
- Died: 20 January 1957 (aged 58) Chișinău, Moldavian SSR, Soviet Union (now Moldova)
- Party: Communist Party^{2}
- 1.Pyotr Borodin and Nikita Salogor were first secretaries of the Communist Party of Moldova.

Tihon Konstantinov (Ukrainian: Тихон Антонович Константинов, romanized: Tykhon Antonovych Konstantynov; 13 August 1898 – 20 January 1957) was a Soviet politician who served as the Chairman of the Council of People's Commissars of the Moldavian SSR from 1940 to 1945.

== Biography ==
Konstantinov was born in the village Khoroshe of Pavlograd uyezd, Yekaterinoslav Governorate (now in Luhansk Oblast, Ukraine). The village was located by the Samara river, while next to the village there was the estate Dobrenkoe. In 1921, he entered the Communist Party of Ukraine, and began party work within the Ukrainian SSR.

In the 1938–1940, he was a chairman of the council in the Moldavian ASSR in Tiraspol and a candidate of the Central Committee of the Communist Party of Ukraine, with the latter position him serving as until 1949.

Tihon Konstantinov was the prime minister of Moldavian SSR (2 August 1940 – 17 April 1945) (in exile in Russian SFSR from June 1941 until August 1944). The exact name was Chairman of the Council of People's Commissars. During this time in August 1940, alongside the other leadereship of the Moldavian SSR, he proposed that the southern border of the Moldavian SSR be drawn to include within Moldava the districts of Reni, Bolgrad, Izmail, and Bilhorod-Dnistrovskyi, which he justified because he stated they had a majority Moldovan population.

During his mandate as prime minister, Pyotr Borodin and Nikita Salogor were first secretaries of the Communist Party of Moldova.

From March to July 1945 he served in his last prominent position as a member of the Bureau Central Committee of the All-Union Communist Party (Bolsheviks) in Moldova.

== Awards ==
- Order of Lenin (February 7, 1939), for prominent successes in Agriculture and particularly for over-fulfillment of plans for major agricultural works.

Political offices
Preceded by formation of republic	Chairman of the Council of People's Commissars of the Moldavian SSR; August 2, 1940 – April 17, 1945	Succeeded by Nicolae Coval
