= Kostiantynivka, Mykolaiv Oblast =

Rural locality in Mykolaiv Oblast, Ukraine

Kostiantynivka Костянтинівка
- Rural settlement
- Location within Ukraine Location within Mykolaiv Oblast
- Coordinates: 47°49′59″N 31°8′11″E
- Country: Ukraine
- Oblast: Mykolaiv Oblast
- Raion: Voznesensk Raion

Population (2022)
  - Total: 2,154
- Time zone: UTC+2 (EET)
  - Summer (DST): UTC+3 (EEST)

Kostiantynivka (Ukrainian: Костянтинівка; Russian: Константиновка) is a rural settlement in Voznesensk Raion in the north of Mykolaiv Oblast, Ukraine. It belongs to Yuzhnoukrainsk urban hromada, one of the hromadas of Ukraine. Population: 2,154 (2022 estimate).

Kostiantynivka is located on the left bank of the Southern Bug and is adjacent to the city of Pivdennoukrainsk.

== History ==
Kostiantynivka was founded before 1775 by Zaporozhian Cossacks. It was a settlement guarding a ford across the Southern Bug.

In 1816, Kostiantynivka became a military settlement which belonged to Yelisavetgradsky Uyezd of Kherson Governorate. It was a part of the 2nd Bug Uhlan Regiment, which later was renamed Odessa Uhlan Regiment. In 1828, Yelisavetgradsky Uyezd was merged with Olviopolsky Uyezd into Bobrinetsky Uyezd. In 1857, military settlements were abolished. In 1865, the administrative center of Bobrinetsky Uyezd was moved to Yelisavetgrad, and the uyezd was renamed Yelisavetgradsky. Kostiantynivka was a selo and the center of Konstantinovskaya Volost of Yelisavetgradsky Uyezd.

On 16 April 1920, Kherson Governorate was renamed Nikolayev Governorate, and on 21 October 1922, it was merged into Odessa Governorate. In 1923, uyezds in Ukrainian Soviet Socialist Republic were abolished, and the governorates were divided into okruhas. In 1925, the governorates were abolished, and okruhas were directly subordinated to Ukrainian SSR. In 1930, okruhas were abolished, and in 1931, Arbuzynka Raion, with the administrative center in Harbuzynka, was established. On 27 February 1932, Odessa Oblast was established, and Arbuzynka Raion was included into Odessa Oblast. In 1944, Arbuzynka Raion was transferred to Mykolaiv Oblast. In January 1963, during the abortive Khrushchyov administrative reform, Arbuzynka Raion was abolished, and Kostiantynivka was moved to Bratske Raion. In 1966, Arbuzynka Raion was re-established. In 1976, Kostiantynivka was granted urban-type settlement status.

On 18 July 2020, Arbuzynka Raion was abolished as part of the administrative reform of Ukraine, which reduced the number of raions of Mykolaiv Oblast to four. The area of Arbuzynka Raion was merged into Pervomaisk Raion, however, Kostiantynivka was transferred to Voznesensk Raion. On 26 January 2024, a new law entered into force which abolished the status of urban-type settlement status, and Kostiantynivka became a rural settlement.

== Economy ==
=== Transportation ===
The closest railway station, about 5 kilometres (3.1 mi) east of the settlement, is Yuzhnoukrainska railway station, on the railway line connecting Odesa and Pomichna.

== Natives ==
- Nikita Salogor, Soviet Moldavian politician
