= Pyotr Borodin =

Soviet politician

- Пётр Бородин

1st First Secretary of the Moldavian Communist Party
- In office 14 August 1940 – 11 February 1942
- Premier: Tihon Konstantinov
- Succeeded by: Nikita Salogor

First Secretary of the Communist Party of the Moldavian ASSR
- In office June 1939 – 14 August 1940
- Premier: Fedor Brovko
- Preceded by: Aleksei Melnikov

Personal details
- Born: 6 June 1905 Yekaterinoslav, Russian Empire (now Ukraine)
- Died: 1986 (aged 80–81) Uzhhorod, Ukrainian SSR, Soviet Union
- Party: Communist Party of Moldova, Communist Party of Ukraine

Pyotr Grigoryevich Borodin (Russian: Пётр Григорьевич Бородин; June 6 [O.S. May 23] 1905 – 1986) was a Soviet politician who served as First Secretary of the Regional Committee of Moldova of the Communist Party of the MSSR (1939–1942).

== Biography ==
Borodin was born on June 6, 1905.

Borodin graduated from the Dnipropetrovsk Building Institute in 1930 and became a construction engineer. He completed his post-graduate studies in 1936, at the Dnipropetrovsk Building Institute.

In 1926, he became a member of the Russian Communist Party (Bolshevik). In the 1930s, he was a high-ranking official in the Moldavian ASSR in Tiraspol; he was the second Secretary of the Communist Party in Moldavian ASSR (February – June 1939) and the First Secretary of the Communist Party in Moldavian ASSR (June 1939 – 14 August 1940).

Borodin was the First Secretary of the Moldavian Communist Party (August 14, 1940 – February 11, 1942). He was simultaneously a member of the CC of the Communist Party of Ukraine (17 May 1940 – 25 January 1949), a member of the central revisioning Commission of the Communist Party of the USSR and a member of the military Council of the Southern front of the Red Army. Between February 20, 1941 – October 5, 1952 he was a member of the Central Revision Commission of the CPSU. He died in 1986.

Party political offices
Preceded by Regional committee of the Communist Party of Ukraine	First Secretary of the Moldavian Communist Party; August 14, 1940 – February 11, 1942	Succeeded by Nikita Salogor
