= Nicolae Coval =

Moldovan politician

- Николай Коваль

First Secretary of the Moldavian Communist Party
- In office 5 January 1946 – July 1950
- Premier: Gherasim Rudi
- Preceded by: Nikita Salogor
- Succeeded by: Leonid Brezhnev

Chairman of the Council of People's Commissars of the Moldavian SSR
- In office 17 April 1945 – 4 January 1946
- Preceded by: Tihon Konstantinov
- Succeeded by: Gherasim Rudi

Personal details
- Born: 19 December 1904 Camenca, Russian Empire (now Moldova)
- Died: 15 January 1970 (aged 65) Chişinău, Moldavian SSR, Soviet Union
- Party: Communist Party of Moldova

Nicolae Coval (19 December 1904 – 15 January 1970) was a Soviet and Moldavian politician.

== Biography ==
Nicolae Coval was born on 19 December 1904 in the city of Camenca, Russian Empire (now in Transnistria, Republic of Moldova). Nicolae Coval became a member of the CPSU in 1939; in the period 1940–1945, he served as the People's Commissar for Agriculture of the MSSR. At Congresses I - IV, X - XII of the Communist Party of the MSSR was elected as a member of the Central Committee. He also served as deputy to the Supreme Soviet of the USSR (in Legislative 1, 2, 6 and 7) and deputy of the Supreme Soviet of the USSR (in the 1-3 legislatures).

Coval was the prime minister of Moldavian SSR (17 April 1945 – 5 January 1946). Coval was also the First Secretary of the Moldavian Communist Party (5 January 1946 - July 1950).

During his rule, the hunger of 1946-1947 occurred in the Moldаvian SSR, when more than 170 thousand people died. The hunger had partially objective reasons (relatively low harvest), while partially was organized by Soviet Authorities (Joseph Stalin and the Communist Party), which urged the completion of Soviet grain stocks. The hunger was stopped in the autumn of 1947, after which a forced collectivisation of agriculture in Bessarabia was ordered by Soviet authorities.

== Bibliography ==
- Enciclopedia sovietică moldovenească (Chişinău, 1970–1977)

Party political offices
Preceded by Nikita Salogor	First Secretary of the Moldavian Communist Party; 5 January 1946 – July 1950	Succeeded by Leonid Brezhnev
Political offices
Preceded by Tihon Konstantinov	Chairman of the Council of People's Commissars of the Moldavian SSR; 17 April 1945 – 5 January 1946	Succeeded by Gherasim Rudi
