= Cuhureștii de Sus =

Cuhureştii de Sus
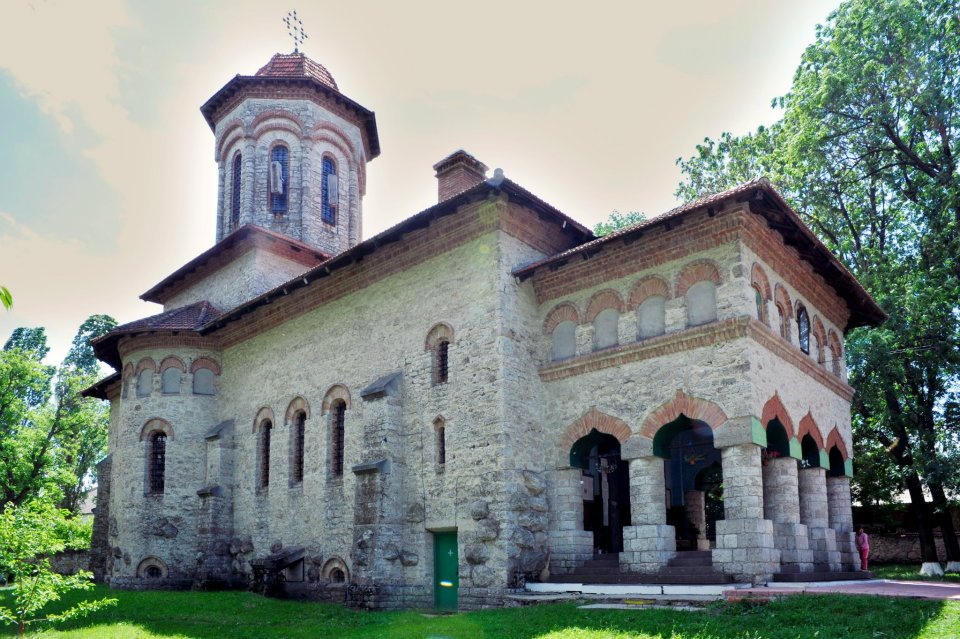

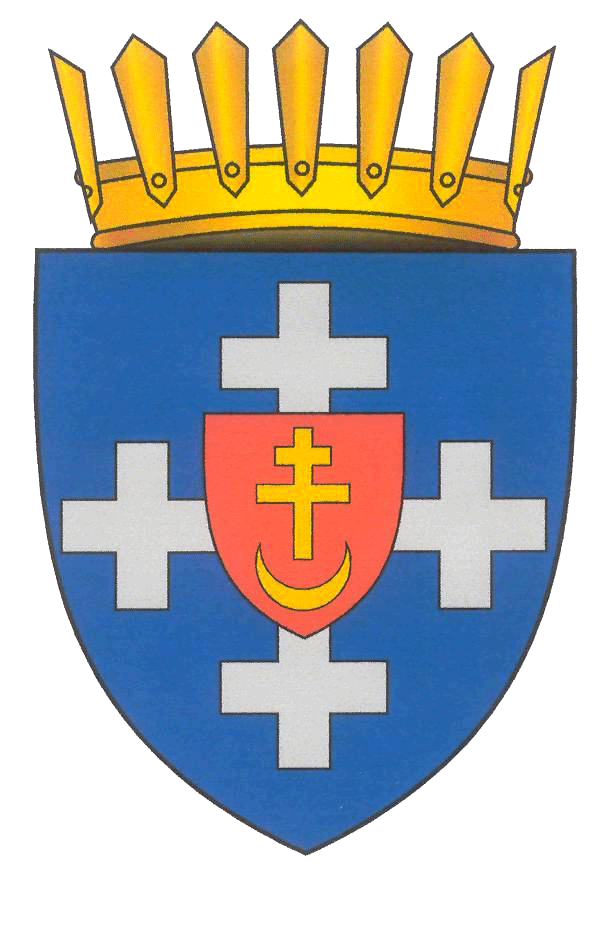
- Flag Coat of arms

- Location within Moldova
- Coordinates: 47°55′15″N 28°55′15″E
- Country: Moldova
- County: Floreşti District

Area
  - Total: 4.99 km^{2} (1.93 sq mi)
- Elevation: 221 m (725 ft)

Population (2014)
  - Total: 2,173
  - Density: 435/km^{2} (1,130/sq mi)
- Time zone: UTC+2 (EET)
  - Summer (DST): UTC+3 (EEST)
- Postal code: (MD-)6642
- Area code: +373 250
- Vehicle registration: FR

Cuhureștii de Sus is a commune in Floreşti District, Moldova. It is composed of four villages: Cuhureștii de Sus, Nicolaevca, Unchitești and Unchitești station.
