= Ion Varta =

Moldovan politician (born 1958)

Member of the Commission for the Study of the Communist Dictatorship in Moldova
- In office 14 January 2010 – 2 July 2010

Member of the Moldovan Parliament
- In office 2005–2009

Personal details
- Born: 8 December 1958 (age 67) Larga, Briceni
- Party: Popular Front of Moldova
- Other political affiliations: Christian-Democratic People's Party (Moldova)
- Education: Moldova State University

Ion Varta (born 12 December 1958) is an academic and politician from the Republic of Moldova.

== Biography ==
After graduating in 1982 from Moldova State University with a degree in history, he joined the faculty at Ion Creangă State Pedagogical University.

From 2005 to 2009, Varta served as member of the Parliament of Moldova. He was a member of the Commission for the Study of the Communist Dictatorship in Moldova.
