= Communist Party of Moldavia =

Soviet political party (1940–1991)

Communist Party of Moldavia Partidul Comunist al Moldovei
- Founded: 15 August 1940
- Banned: 23 August 1991
- Preceded by: Moldavia Regional Committee of the Communist Party of Ukraine
- Succeeded by: Agrarian Party of Moldova (legal successor); Party of Communists of the Republic of Moldova (claimed but not the legal successor)
- Headquarters: Chişinău
- Ideology: Communism; Marxism–Leninism; Moldovenism
- Political position: Far-left
- National affiliation: Communist Party of the Soviet Union
- Colours: Red
- Supreme Soviet (1990): 177 / 380 (47%)

Party flag

The Communist Party of Moldavia (Romanian: Partidul Comunist al Moldovei, PCM, Moldovan Cyrillic: Партидул Комунист ал Молдовей; Russian: Коммунистическая партия Молдавии, romanized: Kommunisticheskaya partiya Moldavii) was the ruling and sole legal political party of the Moldavian SSR. It was one of the fifteen republic-level parties that formed the Communist Party of the Soviet Union (CPSU) until the fall of the Soviet Union in 1991. During World War II, it was the driving force of the Moldovan resistance against Axis occupation.

The party began to weaken politically during the Perestroika period, which was marked by riots against Soviet rule. The party leader, Semion Grossu was replaced with Petru Lucinschi on 16 November 1989.

The Communist Party was banned on 23 August 1991; subsequently, on 27 August, Moldova declared Independence and the Moldavian Soviet Socialist Republic came to an end. On 7 September 1993, the Parliament of Moldova lifted the ban on communist activities.

== List of first secretaries ==
No.	Picture	Name (Birth–Death)	Took office	Left office	Political party
First Secretary
1		Pyotr Borodin (1905–1986)	15 August 1940	11 February 1942	CPM/CPSU
2		Nikita Salogor (1901–1982)	13 February 1942	5 January 1946	CPM/CPSU
3		Nicolae Coval (1904–1970)	5 January 1946	3 November 1950	CPM/CPSU
4		Leonid Brezhnev (1906–1982)	3 November 1950	16 April 1952	CPM/CPSU
5		Dimitri Gladki (1911–1959)	16 April 1952	7 February 1954	CPM/CPSU
6		Zinovie Serdiuk (1903–1982)	8 February 1954	29 May 1961	CPM/CPSU
7		Ivan Bodiul (1918–2013)	29 May 1961	30 December 1980	CPM/CPSU
8		Semion Grossu (born 1934)	30 December 1980	16 November 1989	CPM/CPSU
9		Petru Lucinschi (born 1940)	16 November 1989	4 February 1991	CPM/CPSU
10		Grigore Eremei (1935–2024)	4 February 1991	23 August 1991	CPM/CPSU

== Successors and revival attempt ==
In 1993, former PCM members founded the Party of Communists of the Republic of Moldova (PCRM), which became the largest party in Moldova since the 2001 elections, and the ruling party from 2001 to 2009. In 2011 a group of communists led by the executive secretary of the old Communist Party of Moldova, Igor Cucer, came to the public attention, claiming that they are the "real communists" and they want to formally revive the party (PCM). They also stated that "the PCRM has become a pseudo-Communist and liberal-bourgeois party serving the interests of one of the county’s richest men, Oleg Voronin," son of president of Moldova from 2001 to 2009 and leader of the PCRM Vladimir Voronin. Cucer claimed then: "The PCRM's 8-year rule made the poor poorer and the rich richer".

The Commission for the Study of the Communist Dictatorship in Moldova was created in 2010 to study and analyze the 1917–1991 period of the communist regime.

== See also ==
- Category:Communist Party of Moldavia politicians
