= Ochiul Alb =

- Location within Moldova
- Coordinates: 48°01′N 27°40′E
- Country: Moldova
- District: Drochia District

Population (2014 census)
  - Total: 2,636
- Time zone: UTC+2 (EET)
  - Summer (DST): UTC+3 (EEST)

Ochiul Alb is a village in Drochia District, Moldova. At the 2004 census, the commune had 3,089 inhabitants.
