= COVID-19 pandemic in Transnistria =

- Disease: COVID-19
- Pathogen: SARS-CoV-2
- Location: Transnistria
- First outbreak: Wuhan, Hubei, China
- Index case: Bender and Rîbnița
- Arrival date: 21 March 2020 (6 years and 5 months)
- Confirmed cases: 51,193 (49,159 reported by the PMR, 2,037 reported by Moldova)
- Recovered: 48,612 (47,479 reported by the PMR, 1,133 reported by Moldova)
- Deaths: 1,227 (35 reported by the PMR, 1,192 reported by Moldova)

Government website
- Coronavirus: official data

External videos
- Governmental campaign "Stay home". 24 March 2020
- Police cars on a street of Tiraspol with speakers urging people to remain in home. 25 March 2020
- Erection of a border between Varnița (under Moldova administration) and Bender (within Transnistrian control), aiming tension between both sides. 17 March 2020

The COVID-19 pandemic was confirmed to have reached Transnistria (internationally recognised as a part of Moldova) in March 2020.

== Background ==
On 12 January 2020, the World Health Organization (WHO) confirmed that a novel coronavirus was the cause of a respiratory illness in a cluster of people in Wuhan City, Hubei Province, China, which was reported to the WHO on 31 December 2019.

The case fatality ratio for COVID-19 has been much lower than SARS of 2003, but the transmission has been significantly greater, with a significant total death toll.

== Timeline ==
=== March 2020 ===
- 13 March: The Government of Transnistria banned all public gatherings.
- 17 March: The government announced the shutdown of all kindergartens, schools, colleges and universities until the 5 April. The entrance of foreign citizens (including Moldovan ones) to Transnistrian territory was also banned for a period of 19 days.
- 21 March: The first two positive COVID-19 cases were announced in Transnistria.
- 24 March: The government announced the suspension of public transport.
- 25 March: According to the television channel TV PMR, the Government reported that there were seven people infected with the coronavirus, including two minors.
- 30 March: By decree of the Ministry of Internal Affairs of Transnistria, during the state of emergency, all citizens must carry an identity document and a special permission to be outside of their homes.
- 31 March: A 55-year-old woman from Tiraspol who had heart problems and diabetes is the first reported fatality of COVID-19 in Transnistria. At the time of her death, she was in an intensive care unit connected to a ventilator.

=== April 2020 ===
- 4 April: The Government of Transnistria introduced a ban on the export of food products.
- 14 April: Wearing of face masks in public places becomes mandatory. People without masks were warned that they would be restricted from accessing shops, pharmacies, and food markets.
- 21 April: President Vadim Krasnoselsky cancelled the Victory Day parade on Suvorov Square.

== Vaccines ==
An agreement was made with Russia in December 2020 to receive 300,000 doses of the Sputnik V vaccine, but these had not been received as of late February. Moldova has stated it will provide 10% of all vaccines it obtains to Transnistria.

== Statistics ==
Total No. of cases:

Total number of cases by age (21 January 2021):

Total number of cases by sex (21 January 2021), in %

COVID-19 cases in Transnistria by location (until 19 May 2020):

Location	Cases
Tiraspol	322
Bender	216
Dubăsari	61
Sucleia	24
Rîbnița	21
Slobozia	19
Parcani	17
Caragaș	16
Cioburciu	12
Mălăiești	10
Blijnii Hutor	8
Pervomaisc	5
Roghi	5
Harmațca	5
Hlinaia	5
Chițcani	4
Vladimirovca	4
Tîrnauca	4
Coicova	4
Țîbuleuca	4
Tașlîc	4
Doibani	4
Teiu	3
Crasnoe	3
Dnestrovsc	3
Hlinaia	3
Cremenciug	2
Zăzuleni	2
Șipca	2
Proteagailovca	2
Nezavertailovca	1
Novovladimirovca	1
Popencu	1
Crasnîi Vinogradari	1
Mihailovca Nouă	1
Stroiești	1
Goian	1
Crasnaia Gorca	1
Grigoriopol	1
Camenca	1
Novocotovsc	1
Tiraspolul Nou	1
Total	806

== Gallery ==
Image of the Transnistrian governmental campaign "Stay home"

== See also ==
- COVID-19 pandemic in Gagauzia
- COVID-19 pandemic in Moldova
- COVID-19 pandemic in Ukraine
- COVID-19 pandemic in Romania
- COVID-19 pandemic in Russia
