= Goian =

Goian may refer to:

- Goian, Transnistria, a commune in Transnistria, Moldova
- Goian Island, Dubăsari district, Transnistria, Moldova
- Goian, a village in Ciorescu commune, Chişinău, Moldova

== People with the surname ==
- Dorin Goian, Romanian footballer playing for Palermo
- Lucian Goian, Romanian footballer playing for Dinamo Bucureşti
