= Fyodor Brovko =

Soviet Moldovian politician

- Fiodor Brovko; Фёдор Бровко
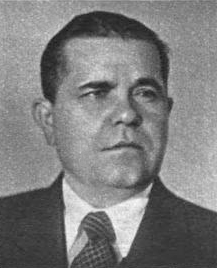
- Brovko in 1950

1st Chairman of the Presidium of the Supreme Soviet of the Moldavian SSR
- In office 10 February 1941 – 26 March 1951
- Premier: Tihon Konstantinov; Nicolae Coval; Gherasim Rudi
- Succeeded by: Ion Codiță

Chairman of the Presidium of the Supreme Soviet of the Moldavian ASSR
- In office 7 June 1940 – 8 February 1941
- Preceded by: Grigory Staryy
- Succeeded by: Office abolished

Personal details
- Born: Fyodor Grigoryevich Brovko; 16 May 1904 Popencu, Russian Empire (now Popencu, Moldova)
- Died: 24 January 1960 (aged 55) Chișinău, Moldavian SSR, Soviet Union (now Moldova)
- Citizenship: Soviet Union
- Party: CPSU
- Awards: Order of Lenin Order of the Red Banner Order of the Red Banner of Labour

Fyodor Grigoryevich Brovko (Romanian: Fiodor Brovko; Russian: Фёдор Григо́рьевич Бровко́; 16 May 1904 – 24 January 1960) was a Soviet and Moldavian politician who served as the Chairman of the Presidium of the Supreme Soviet of the Moldavian Soviet Socialist Republic from 1941 to 1951.

== Early life and education ==
Fyodor Brovko was born to a poor peasant family in the village of Popencu in the Russian Empire on May 16, 1904. He graduated from a Communist Party school in Balta in 1930.

== Political career ==
Brovko joined the Communist Party of the Soviet Union in 1927. From 1930 to 1937, he worked as the Head of the Department of Propaganda and Agitation for the Dubăsari, Kotovsk (Hîncești), and Slobozia District Committees of the Communist Party of Ukraine (Moldavian Autonomous Soviet Socialist Republic). In 1937, he was appointed as the First Secretary of the Slobozia District Committee of the Communist Party of Ukraine of the Moldavian Autonomous Soviet Socialist Republic. From 1938 to 1940, he served as the Deputy Chairman and the Chairman of the Council of People's Commissars of the Moldavian Autonomous Soviet Socialist Republic. On March 1, 1941, Brovko was elected as a member of the Politburo of the Central Committee of the Communist Party of Moldavia. From June 7, 1940, to February 8, 1941, he served as the Chairman of the Presidium of the Supreme Soviet of the Moldavian ASSR. During a purge of party officials in 1951, Brovko was removed from his post. He worked in minor positions in the Moldavian SSR from 1951 to 1958.

He was a member of the Supreme Soviet of the Soviet Union for the 2nd and 3rd convocations.

== Death ==
Fyodor Brovko died on January 24, 1960, in Chișinău, Moldavian Soviet Socialist Republic, Soviet Union.

== Awards ==
- (Soviet Union) Order of Lenin
- (Soviet Union) Order of the Red Banner
- (Soviet Union) Order of the Red Banner of Labour

== See also ==
- Communist Party of Moldavia
- Supreme Soviet of the Moldavian SSR
- Moldavian Autonomous Soviet Socialist Republic
