= Beloci =

Beloci Белочи (Russian) Білоч (Ukrainian)
- Village
- Location within Moldova
- Coordinates: 47°53′8″N 28°58′56″E
- Country (de jure): Moldova
- Country (de facto): Transnistria (Note: Transnistria's political status is disputed. It considers itself to be an independent state, but this is not recognised by any UN member state. The Moldovan government and the international community consider Transnistria a part of Moldova's territory.)
- Elevation: 56 m (184 ft)
- Time zone: UTC+2 (EET)
  - Summer (DST): UTC+3 (EEST)

Beloci (Moldovan Cyrillic: Белоч, Russian: Белочи, romanized: Belochi, Ukrainian: Білоч, romanized: Biloch, Polish: Biełocz) is a village in the Rîbniţa District of Transnistria, Moldova. It has since 1990 been administered as a part of the breakaway Pridnestrovian Moldavian Republic.

== History ==
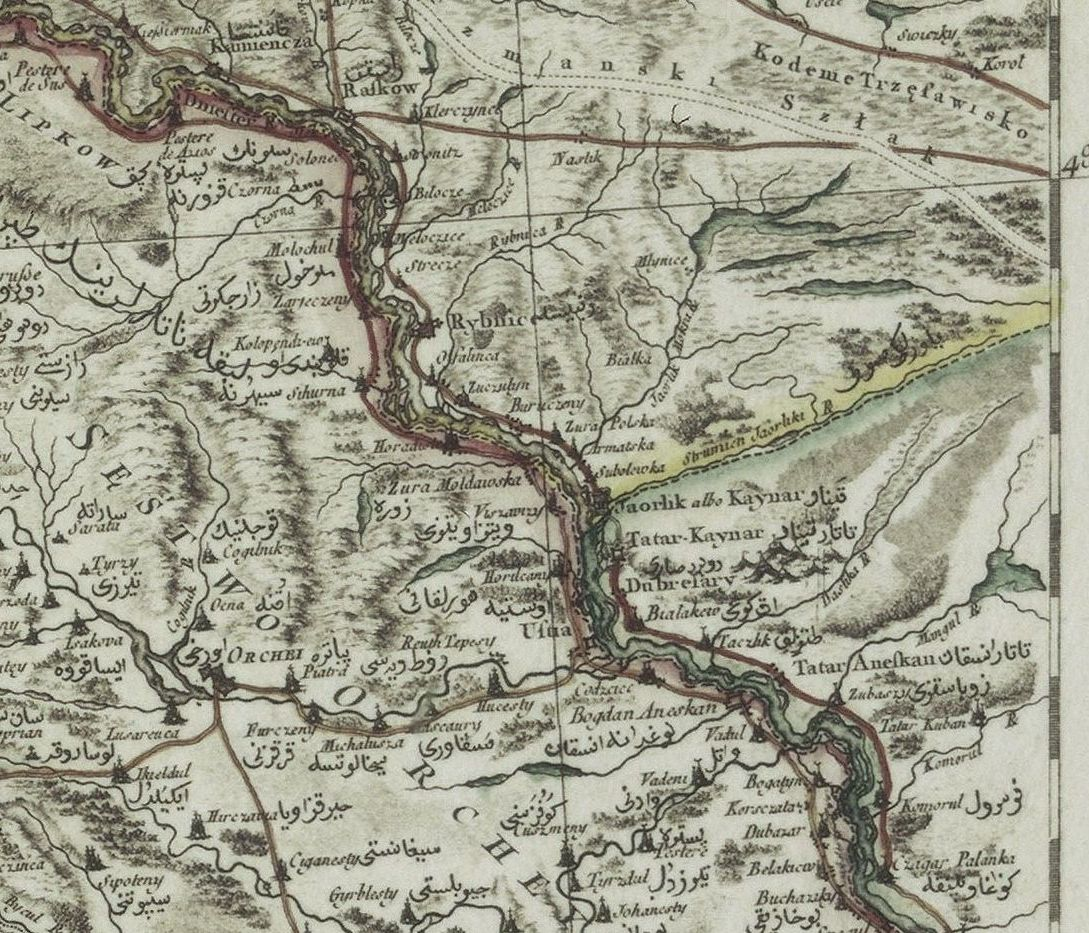
Fragment of a map of Poland from 1772 with Biłocze marked

Biełocz, as it was known in Polish, was a private village of the Lubomirski family, administratively located in the Bracław County in the Bracław Voivodeship in the Lesser Poland Province of the Kingdom of Poland. Following the Second Partition of Poland, it was annexed by Russia. In the 19th century, it remained a possession of Polish nobility, i.e. Karwowski and Mańkowski families.

In 1924, it became part of the Moldavian Autonomous Oblast, which was soon converted into the Moldavian Autonomous Soviet Socialist Republic, and the Moldavian Soviet Socialist Republic in 1940 during World War II. From 1941 to 1944, it was administered by Romania as part of the Transnistria Governorate. According to the 2004 census, the village's population was 524, of which 85 (16.22%) were Moldovans (Romanians), 395 (75.38%) Ukrainians and 38 (7.25%) Russians.
