= Nikolay Sklifosovsky =

Russian surgeon and physiologist

- Николай Склифосовский
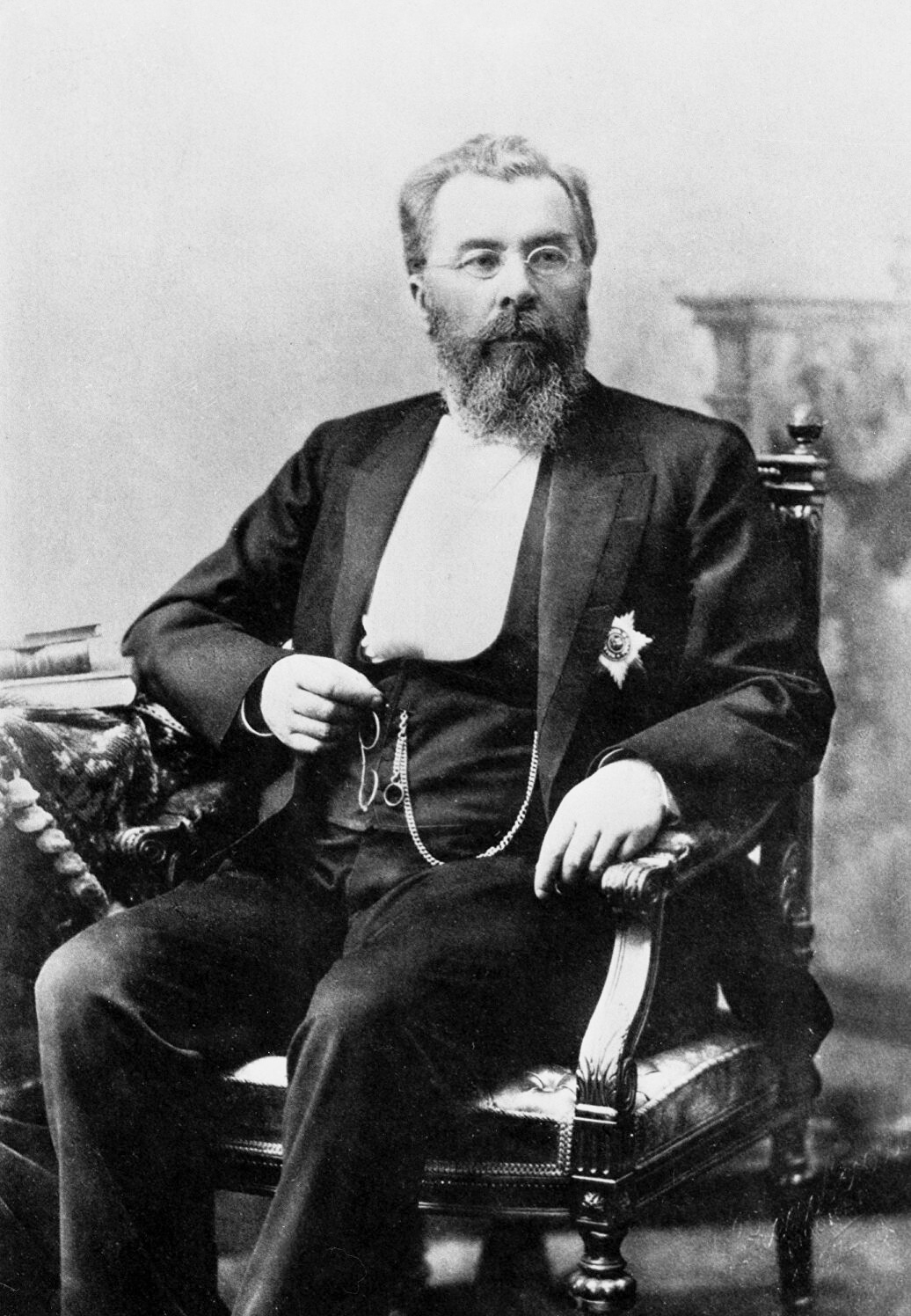
- Sklifosovsky in 1899
- Born: 25 March 1836; Dzerjinscoe, Tiraspolsky Uyezd, Kherson Governorate, Russian Empire
- Died: 30 November 1904 (aged 68) near Poltava, Russian Empire
- Education: Doctor of Science (1863)
- Alma mater: Imperial Moscow University (1859)
- Known for: first application of the aseptic method in surgery; first use of local anesthesia
- Scientific career
- Fields: Medicine
- Workplaces: Imperial Moscow University
- Thesis: About the bloody periutrical tumor (О кровяной околоматочной опухоли)

Nikolai Vasilyevich Sklifosovsky (Russian: Никола́й Васи́льевич Склифосо́вский; 6 April [O.S. 25 March] 1836 — 13 December [O.S. 30 November] 1904) was a Ukrainian surgeon and physiologist of Moldavian origin. He was born near the town of Dubăsari, which is now in Transnistria.

Sklifosovsky was a professor of medicine in Saint Petersburg, Kyiv, and Moscow. He was a founder of the «Clinical Town» at Devichye Pole.

In 1870, on the recommendation of Pirogov, another prominent Russian surgeon, Sklifosovsky was invited to head the department of surgery at Kyiv University. However, he did not stay in Kyiv for long: soon he went to war again, this time to the theater of the Franco-Prussian war.

About 10,000 wounded passed through Sklifosovskyi. The doctors and nurses, among whom was the surgeon's wife Sofya Oleksandrivna, supported Nikolai Vasylievich's strength by occasionally pouring a few sips of wine into his mouth between separate operations.

== Legacy ==
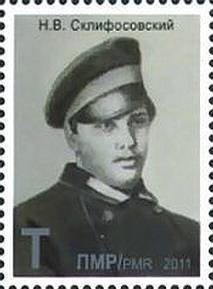
Young Sklifosovsky on a 2012 stamp of Transnistria

The N. V. Sklifosovsky Research Institute for Emergency Medicine, often nicknamed Sklif, has borne his name since 1923.

In 2001 the Central Bank of Transnistria arranged for the minting of a silver coin featuring this native of today's Transnistria, as part of a series of commemorative coins honoring The Outstanding People of Pridnestrovie.

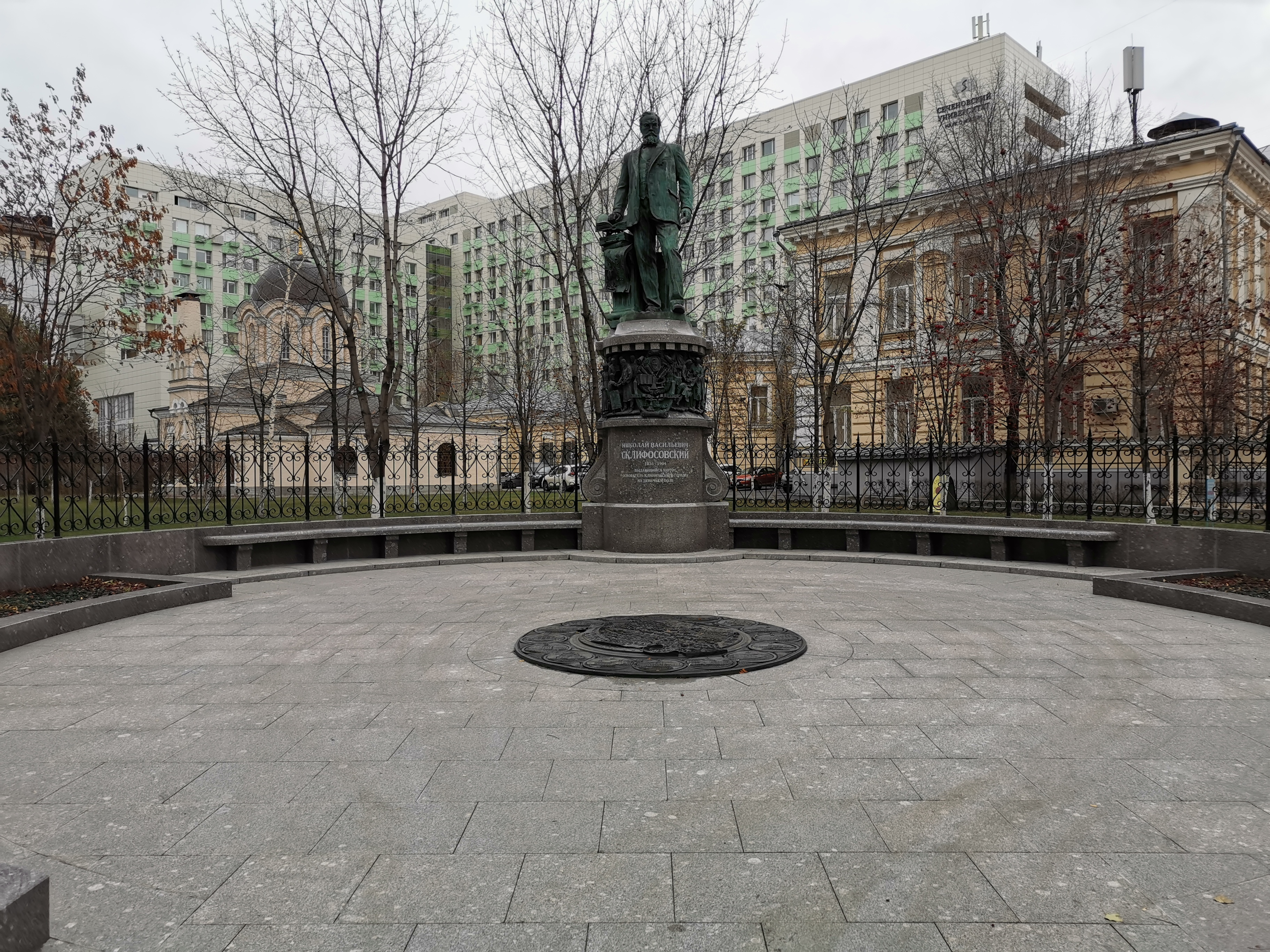
Monument to N.V. Sklifosovsky in Moscow

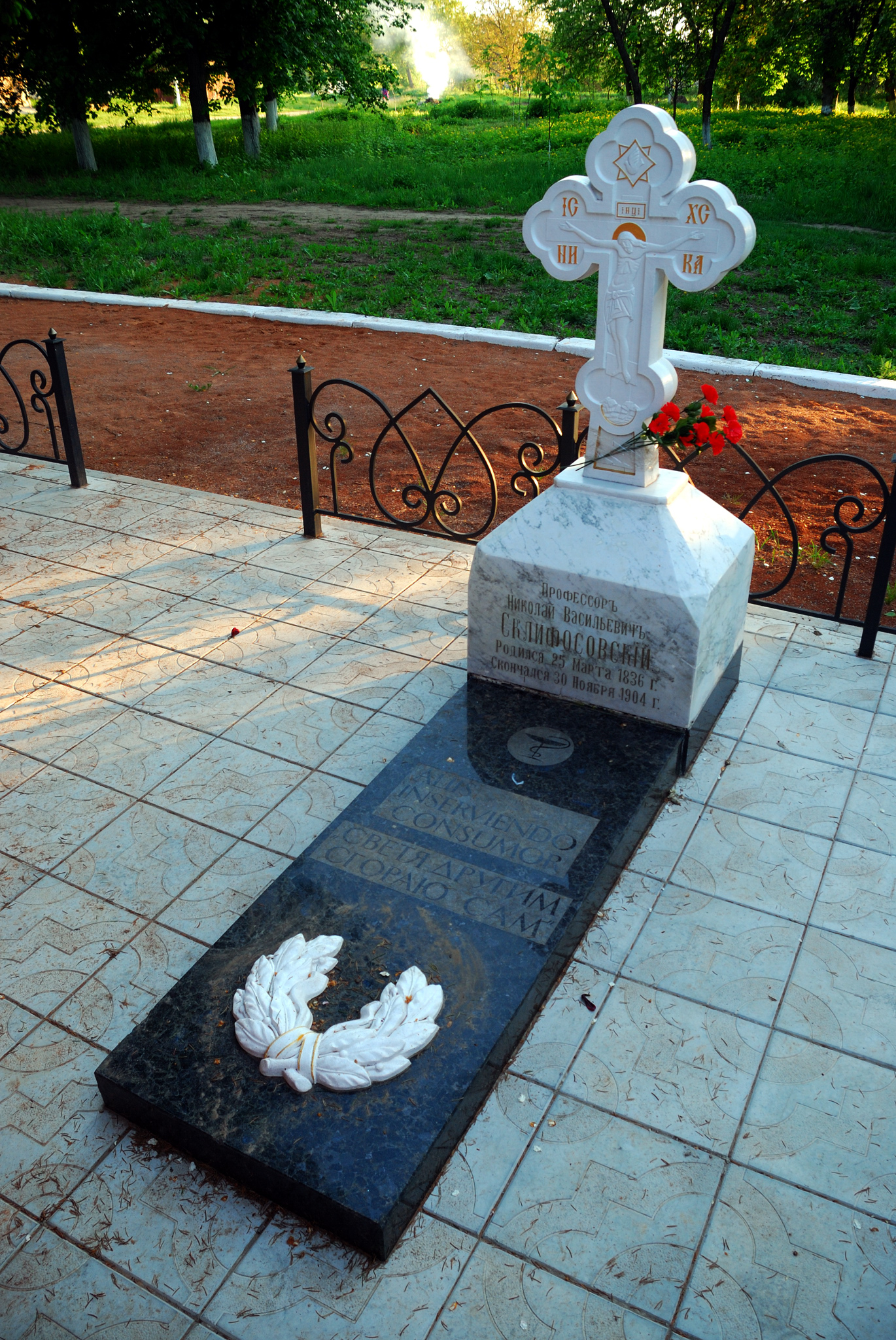
Grave of N. V. Sklifosovsky (Poltava, Yakovtsy)
