= Molochișul Mare =

Molochișul Mare Большой Молокиш (Russian) Великий Молокіш (Ukrainian)
- Village
- Location within Moldova
- Coordinates: 47°51′57″N 29°2′41″E
- Country (de jure): Moldova
- Country (de facto): Transnistria (Note: Transnistria's political status is disputed. It considers itself to be an independent state, but this is not recognised by any UN member state. The Moldovan government and the international community consider Transnistria a part of Moldova's territory.)
- Elevation: 49 m (161 ft)
- Time zone: UTC+2 (EET)
  - Summer (DST): UTC+3 (EEST)

Molochișul Mare (Moldovan Cyrillic: Молокишул Маре, Russian: Большой Молокиш, romanized: Bol'shoy Molokish, Ukrainian: Великий Молокіш, romanized: Velikyy Molokish, Polish: Mołokisz Wielki; lit. 'Great Molochiș' is a village in the Rîbnița District of Transnistria, Moldova. It has since 1990 been administered as a part of the self-proclaimed Pridnestrovian Moldavian Republic.

== History ==
Mołokisz Wielki, as it was known in Polish, was a private village of the Koniecpolski and Lubomirski noble families, administratively located in the Bracław County in the Bracław Voivodeship in the Lesser Poland Province of the Kingdom of Poland. Following the Second Partition of Poland, it was annexed by Russia. In the 19th century, it remained a possession of Polish nobility, passing to the Kulikowski family. In the late 19th century, it had a population of 611.

In 1924, it became part of the Moldavian Autonomous Oblast, which was soon converted into the Moldavian Autonomous Soviet Socialist Republic, and the Moldavian Soviet Socialist Republic in 1940 during World War II. From 1941 to 1944, it was administered by Romania as part of the Transnistria Governorate.

According to the 2004 census, the village's population was 963, of which 837 (86.91%) were Moldovans (Romanians), 68 (7.06%) Ukrainians and 53 (5.5%) Russians.
