= Ghidirim =

Ghidirim Гидирим (ru) Гідірім (uk)
- Village
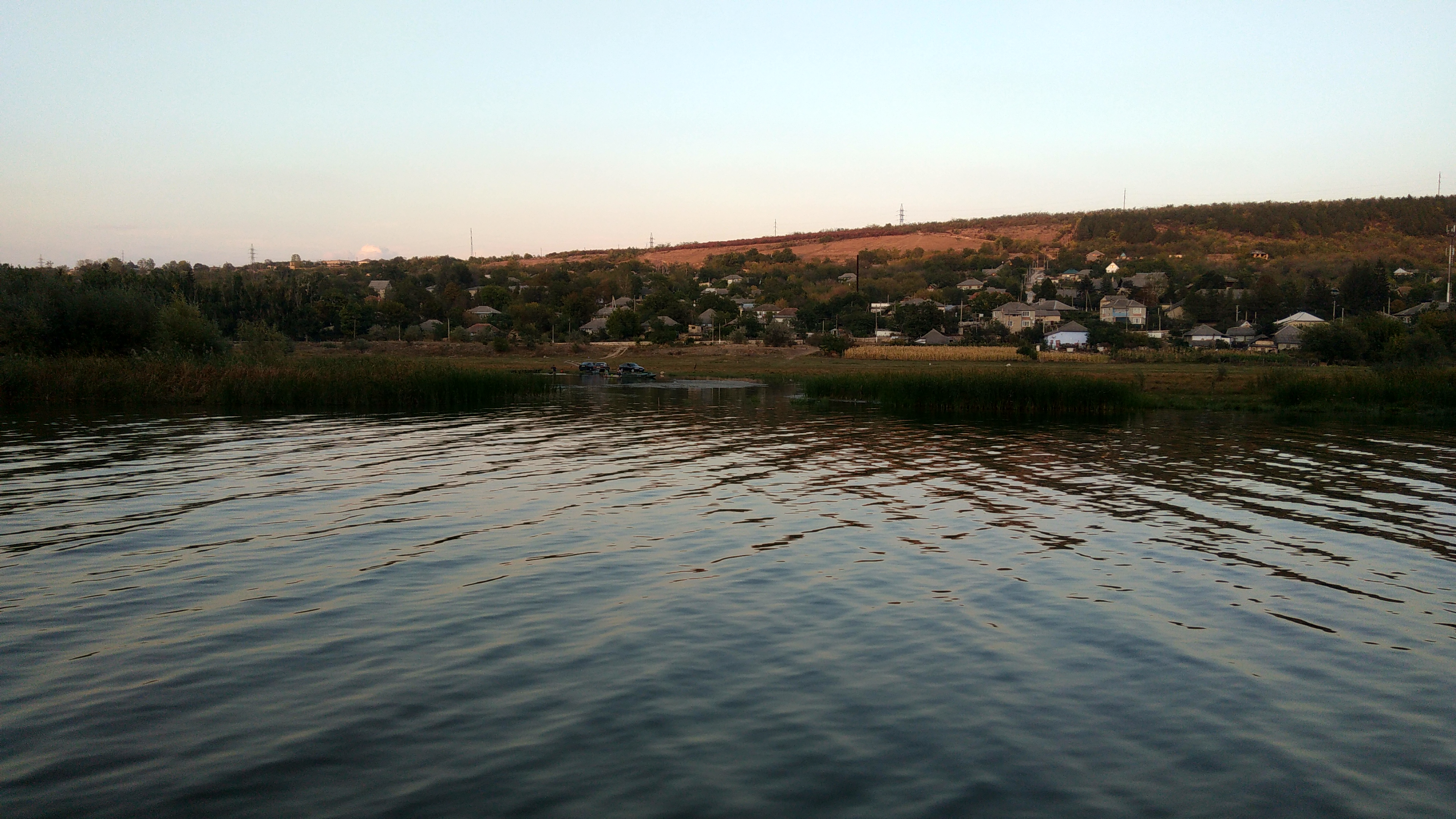

- Location within Moldova
- Coordinates: 47°42′48″N 28°58′43″E
- Country (de jure): Moldova
- Country (de facto): Transnistria (Note: Transnistria's political status is disputed. It considers itself to be an independent state, but this is not recognised by any UN member state. The Moldovan government and the international community consider Transnistria a part of Moldova's territory.)
- Elevation: 61 m (200 ft)
- Time zone: UTC+2 (EET)
  - Summer (DST): UTC+3 (EEST)

Ghidirim (Moldovan Cyrillic and Russian: Гидирим, romanized: Gidirim, Ukrainian: Гідірім, romanized: Gidirim, Polish: Gederyma) is a village in the Rîbnița District of Transnistria, Moldova. It has since 1990 been administered as a part of the self-proclaimed Pridnestrovian Moldavian Republic.

== History ==
Gederyma or Giederym, as it was known in Polish, was a private village of the Lubomirski and Grabowski families, administratively located in the Bracław County in the Bracław Voivodeship in the Lesser Poland Province of the Kingdom of Poland. Following the Second Partition of Poland, it was annexed by Russia. There were 121 houses in the village as of 1868.

In 1924, it became part of the Moldavian Autonomous Oblast, which was soon converted into the Moldavian Autonomous Soviet Socialist Republic, and the Moldavian Soviet Socialist Republic in 1940 during World War II. From 1941 to 1944, it was administered by Romania as part of the Transnistria Governorate.

According to the 2004 census, the population of the locality was 1,255 inhabitants, of which 467 (37.21%) Moldovans (Romanians), 661 (52.66%) Ukrainians and 118 (9.4%) Russians.
