= Broșteni =

Broşteni may refer to several places in Romania:

- Broșteni, Suceava
- Broșteni, Mehedinți
- Broșteni, Vrancea
- Broșteni, a village in Aninoasa, Argeș
- Broșteni, a village in Durnești Commune, Botoşani County
- Broșteni, a village in Bezdead Commune, Dâmboviţa County
- Broşteni, a village in Produlești Commune, Dâmboviţa County
- Broşteni, a village in Vișina, Dâmbovița Commune, Dâmbovița County
- Broşteni and Broştenii de Sus, villages in Plopșoru Commune, Gorj County
- Broşteni, a village in Ion Roată, Ialomița
- Broşteni, a village in Vlădeni, Iași
- Broşteni, a village in Bahna Commune, Neamţ County
- Broşteni, a village in Găvănești Commune, Olt County
- Broşteni, a village in Păuca Commune, Sibiu County
- Broşteni, a village in Drăguşeni, Suceava
- Broşteni, a village in Ivănești Commune, Vaslui County
- Broşteni, a village in Lăpușata Commune, Vâlcea County
- Broşteni, a district in the town of Costeşti, Argeș County
- Broşteni, a district in the town of Oraviţa, Caraş-Severin County
- Perii Broşteni, a village in Olteni Commune, Teleorman County

and to:

- Broşteni, a commune in Transnistria, Moldova
