= Mihailovca =

Mihailovca may refer to several places in Moldova:

- Mihailovca, Cimişlia, a commune in Cimişlia district
- Mihailovca, Transnistria, a commune in Transnistria
- Mihailovca, a village in Prajila Commune, Floreşti district
- Mihailovca, a village in Prepeliţa Commune, Sîngerei district
