= Rîbnița District =

Rîbnița
- district
- Anthem: "Hymn of Rîbnița"
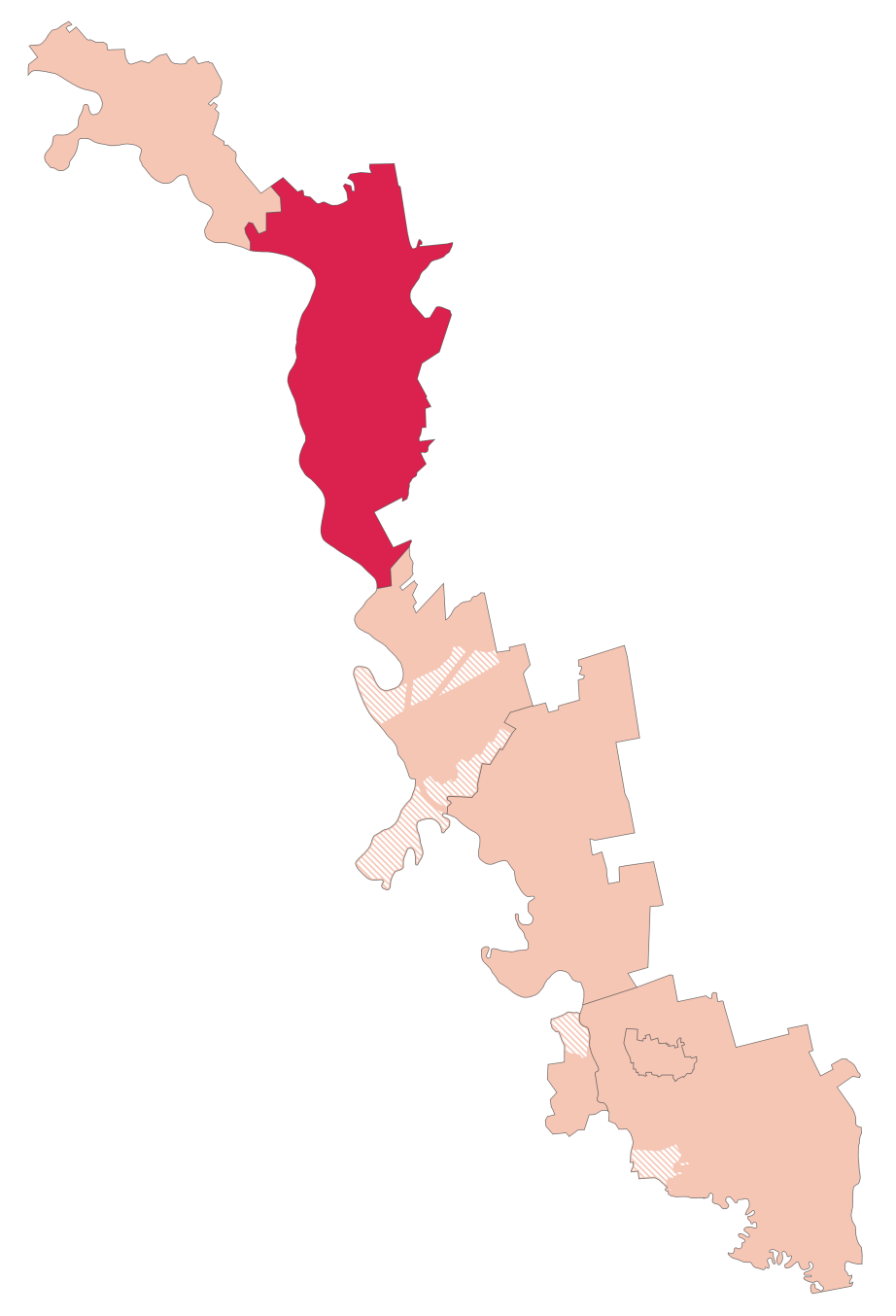
- Country: Moldova
- self-proclaimed state: Transnistria
- Administrative center: Rîbnița

Government
  - Heads of the State Administration of the Rîbnița District and the Rîbnița City: Alla Demyanova

Area
  - Total: 850.2 km^{2} (328.3 sq mi)

Population (2015)
  - Total: 69,000
- Time zone: UTC+2 (EET)
  - Summer (DST): UTC+3 (EEST)

The Rîbnița District (Romanian: Raionul Rîbnița; Russian: Рыбницкий район; Ukrainian: Рибницький район) is an administrative district of Transnistria (de facto) in Moldova (de jure). Its seat is the city of Rîbnița, sometimes spelt as "Râbnița". It is located at 47°45′N 29°00′E. The district contains this city and 22 other communes (with a total of 47 localities, including small villages and hamlets):

Rîbnița

Andreevca Pîcalova Șmalena Beloci Broșteni Butuceni Cobasna Suhaia Rîbnița Cobasna, loc. st. c. f. Crasnencoe Dimitrova Ivanovca	Ghidirim Haraba Hîrjău Mihailovca Nouă Sărăței Jura Lenin Pervomaisc Pobeda Stanislavca Mihailovca	Mocra Basarabca Șevcenco Zaporojeț Molochișul Mare Ofatinți Novaia Jizni Plopi Popencu Chirov Vladimirovca Zăzuleni	Sovetscoe Vasilievca Stroiești Ulmu Ulmul Mic Lîsaia Gora Vadul Turcului Molochișul Mic Vărăncău Buschi Gherșunovca

Rîbnița is located along the river Dniester, in the northern half of Transnistria. According to the 2004 Census in Transnistria, the population of the district is 82,699 people, including 24,729 (29.90%) Moldovans, 37,554 (45.41%) Ukrainians, 14,237 (17.22%) Russians, 149 (0.18%) Gagauzians, 309 (0.37%) Bulgarians, 51 (0.06%) Roma, 177 (0.64%) Jews, 528 (0.64%) Poles, 412 (0.50%) Belarusians, 150 (0.18%) Germans, 81 (0.10%) Armenians, and 4,322 (5.23%) others and non-declared.

== List of heads of the state administration of the Rîbnița District and the town of Rîbnița ==
- Tamara Kharitonovna Kilivnik (3 February 2012 – August 2012)
- Tatiana Mikhailovna Turanskaya (30 August 2012 – 10 July 2013)
- Alla Fedorovna Demyanova (18 September 2013 – )
