= Popencu =

Popencu Попенки (Russian) Попенки (Ukrainian)
- Commune
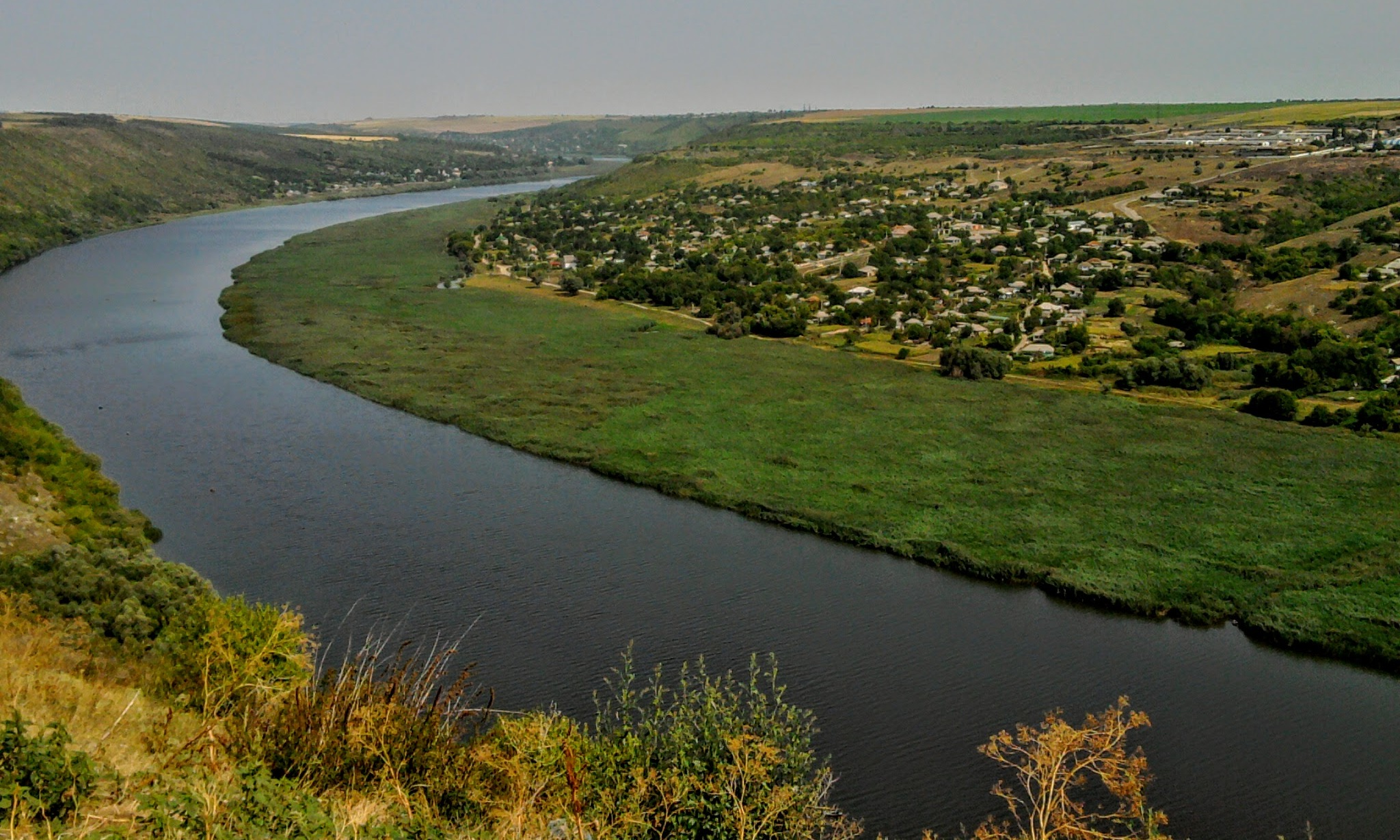

- Location within Moldova
- Coordinates: 47°36′1″N 29°0′29″E
- Country (de jure): Moldova
- Country (de facto): Transnistria (Note: Transnistria's political status is disputed. It considers itself to be an independent state, but this is not recognised by any UN member state. The Moldovan government and the international community consider Transnistria a part of Moldova's territory.)
- Time zone: UTC+2 (EET)
  - Summer (DST): UTC+3 (EEST)

Popencu (Moldovan Cyrillic: Попенку; Ukrainian: Попенки, Popenky, Russian: Попенки, Popenki) is a commune in the north of Transnistria, Moldova. It consists of four villages: Chirov (Кірове, Кирово), Popencu, Vladimirovca (Володимирівка, Владимировка) and Zăzuleni (Зозуляни, Зозуляны), and is part of the Rîbnița District.

== History ==
Popenki, as it was known in Polish, was a private village of the Lubomirski family, administratively located in the Bracław County in the Bracław Voivodeship in the Lesser Poland Province of the Kingdom of Poland. Following the Second Partition of Poland, it was annexed by Russia. Later on, it was a possession of the Ostrowski, Czarnecki and Majewski families. In the late 19th century, it had a population of 638.

In 1924, it became part of the Moldavian Autonomous Oblast, which was soon converted into the Moldavian Autonomous Soviet Socialist Republic, and the Moldavian Soviet Socialist Republic in 1940 during World War II. From 1941 to 1944, it was administered by Romania as part of the Transnistria Governorate.

According to the 2004 census, the population of the village was 2,676 inhabitants, of which 1,203 (44.95%) were Moldovans (Romanians), 995 (37.18%) Ukrainians and 412 (15.39%) Russians.

== Sights ==
The village of Zăzuleni is the site of the Church of Paraskeva the Serbian.

== Notable people ==
- Fyodor Brovko (1904–1960), Soviet Moldavian politician
