= Ulmu, Transnistria =

Ulmu Ульма (Russian) Ульма (Ukrainian)
- Commune
- Location within Moldova
- Coordinates: 47°44′53″N 29°6′19″E
- Country (de jure): Moldova
- Country (de facto): Transnistria (Note: Transnistria's political status is disputed. It considers itself to be an independent state, but this is not recognised by any UN member state. The Moldovan government and the international community consider Transnistria a part of Moldova's territory.)
- District: Rîbnița District
- Elevation: 178 m (584 ft)
- Time zone: UTC+2 (EET)
  - Summer (DST): UTC+3 (EEST)

Ulmu (Ukrainian: Ульма; Russian: Ульма) is a commune in the Rîbnița District, located in Transnistria, Moldova. It comprises three villages: Lîsaia Gora (Лиса Гора, Лысая Гора), Ulmu and Ulmul Mic (Мала Ульма, Малая Ульма). Since 1990, it has been administered as a part of the self-proclaimed Pridnestrovian Moldavian Republic.

According to the 2004 census, the village's population was 998, of which 114 (11.42%) were Moldovans (Romanians), 746 (74.74%) were Ukrainians and 111 (11.12%) were Russians.
