= Goian Island =

Island in Moldova

Coordinates: 47°22′37″N 29°9′40″E

Goian Island (Russian: Остров Гоян, romanized: Ostrov Goyan) is the largest island of the Republic of Moldova. It is part of the Dubăsari district in the separatist region of Transnistria.
