= Comisarovca Nouă =

Comisarovca Nouă Новокомиссаровка (Russian) Нова Комісарівка (Ukrainian)
- Commune
- Location within Moldova
- Coordinates: 47°20′29″N 29°21′46″E
- Country (de jure): Moldova
- Country (de facto): Transnistria (Note: Transnistria's political status is disputed. It considers itself to be an independent state, but this is not recognised by any UN member state. The Moldovan government and the international community consider Transnistria a part of Moldova's territory.)
- Elevation: 107 m (351 ft)
- Time zone: UTC+2 (EET)
  - Summer (DST): UTC+3 (EEST)

Comisarovca Nouă (Moldovan Cyrillic: Комисаровка Ноуэ, Russian: Новокомиссаровка, romanized: Novokomissarovka, Ukrainian: Нова Комісарівка, romanized: Nova Komisarivka) is a commune in the Dubăsari District of Transnistria, Moldova. It is composed of four villages: Bosca (Боска), Comisarovca Nouă, Coșnița Nouă (Нова Кошниця, Новая Кошница) and Pohrebea Nouă (Нове Погреб'я, Новoe Погребье). It has since 1990 been administered as a part of the breakaway Pridnestrovian Moldavian Republic (PMR).

According to the 2004 census, the population of the village was 1,357 inhabitants, of which 1,059 (78.03%) were Moldovans (Romanians), 263 (19.38%) Ukrainians and 30 (2.21%) Russians.
