= Nikolay Iov =

Transnistrian powerlifter and musician

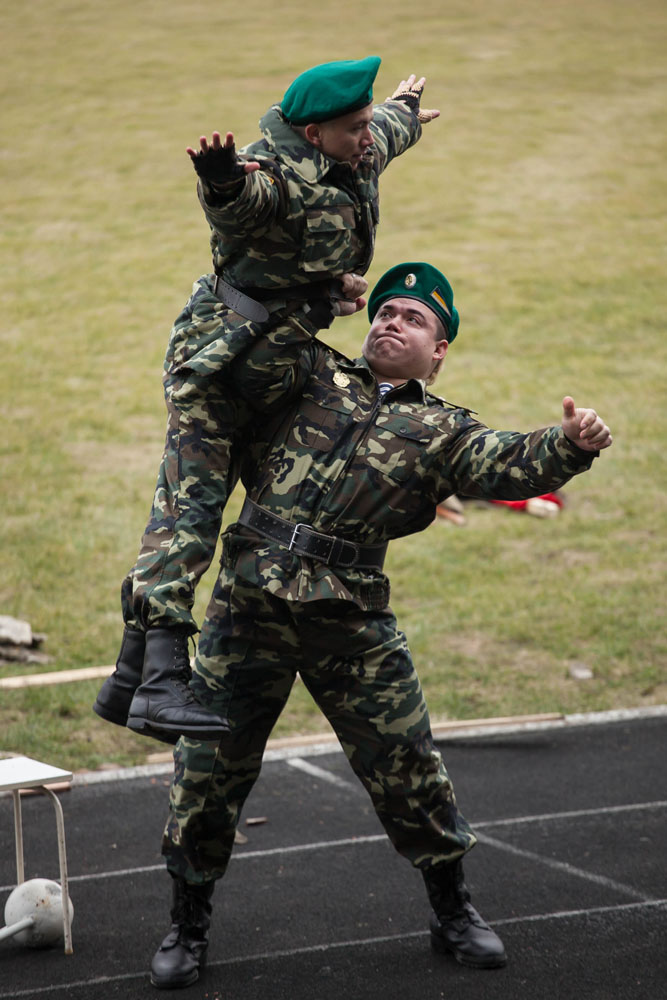
- Iov lifting in 2013

Personal information
- Nationality: Transnistrian / Moldovan / Russian
- Born: 2 September 1990 (age 35) Dubăsari, Moldavian SSR, Soviet Union (now Transnistria/Moldova)

Sport
- Sport: Powerlifting
- Event(s): Squat, bench press, deadlift
- Coached by: Alexander Iov

Nikolay Alexandrovich Iov (Russian: Николай Александрович Иов; Romanian: Nicolae or Nicolai Iov; born 2 September 1990) is a Transnistrian powerlifter and musician. He has competed for Russia in international powerlifting championships and released music to benefit local charitable causes.

== Early life ==
Iov was born in Dubăsari (then in the Soviet Union, now in Moldova under Transnistrian separatist control) in September 1990. He began training in strength sports under the guidance of his father, Alexander Iov—a former Soviet Master of Sport in kayaking—and by the age of eight was winning local youth contests.

== Powerlifting career ==
Between 2010 and 2013, Iov won multiple international junior titles:

- World champion (5×)
- European champion (8×)
- Eurasian champion (5×)
- U.S. junior champion (4×)
- Two titles at the International Open NAPR/RPS at Arnold Classic 2013 in Columbus, Ohio

He was officially awarded the title "Master of Sport of International Class" in Transnistria. A 2012 article reported his victory in the junior world championships in Las Vegas and recognition as "Best Junior Athlete" in the U.S.

His raw totals recorded by OpenPowerlifting include a 606 kg squat, 451.9 kg bench press, and 628.3 kg deadlift, with an overall total exceeding 1600 kg.

== Music & philanthropy ==
In 2022, Iov released the single Живу любя ("Living Out of Love") to support children with disabilities in Transnistria. The track was released as part of the Melodiya dobra (Russian: Мелодия добра, lit. 'Melody of Kindness') campaign and received coverage on regional media, including radio and television broadcasts.

== Personal life ==
Iov resides in Dubăsari and remains active in sports, music, and poetry. He was featured in local media and appeared on the Transnistrian edition of the television talent program Minuta slavy (Russian: Минута славы, lit. 'Minute of Fame').
