= Mihailovca, Transnistria =

Mihailovca Михайловка (Russian) Михайлівка (Ukrainian)
- Village
- Location within Moldova
- Coordinates: 47°29′18″N 29°6′52″E
- Country (de jure): Moldova
- Country (de facto): Transnistria (Note: Transnistria's political status is disputed. It considers itself to be an independent state, but this is not recognised by any UN member state. The Moldovan government and the international community consider Transnistria a part of Moldova's territory.)
- Elevation: 131 m (430 ft)
- Time zone: UTC+2 (EET)
  - Summer (DST): UTC+3 (EEST)

Mihailovca (Moldovan Cyrillic and Russian: Михайловка, romanized: Mikhaylovka, Ukrainian: Михайлівка, romanized: Mikhaylivka, Polish: Michałówka) is a village in the Rîbnița District of Transnistria, Moldova. Since 1990, it has been administered as a part of the self-proclaimed Pridnestrovian Moldavian Republic.

== History ==
Michałówka, as it was known in Polish, was a private village of the Koniecpolski and Lubomirski noble families, administratively located in the Bracław County in the Bracław Voivodeship in the Lesser Poland Province of the Kingdom of Poland. Following the Second Partition of Poland, it was annexed by Russia. In the late 19th century, it had a population of 493.

In 1924, it became part of the Moldavian Autonomous Oblast, which was soon converted into the Moldavian Autonomous Soviet Socialist Republic, and the Moldavian Soviet Socialist Republic in 1940 during World War II. From 1941 to 1944, it was administered by Romania as part of the Transnistria Governorate.

According to the 2004 census, the village's population was 825, of which 789 (95.63%) were Moldovans (Romanians), 12 (1.45%) Ukrainians and 20 (2.42%) Russians.
