= Dubăsari District, Transnistria =

Coordinates: 47°16′N 29°09′E

Dubăsari District
- district
- Map of Dubăsari District (green and grey). Green areas are controlled by Transnistria. Grey areas are controlled by Moldova. Brown, grey and dark green areas are moldovan Dubăsari District.

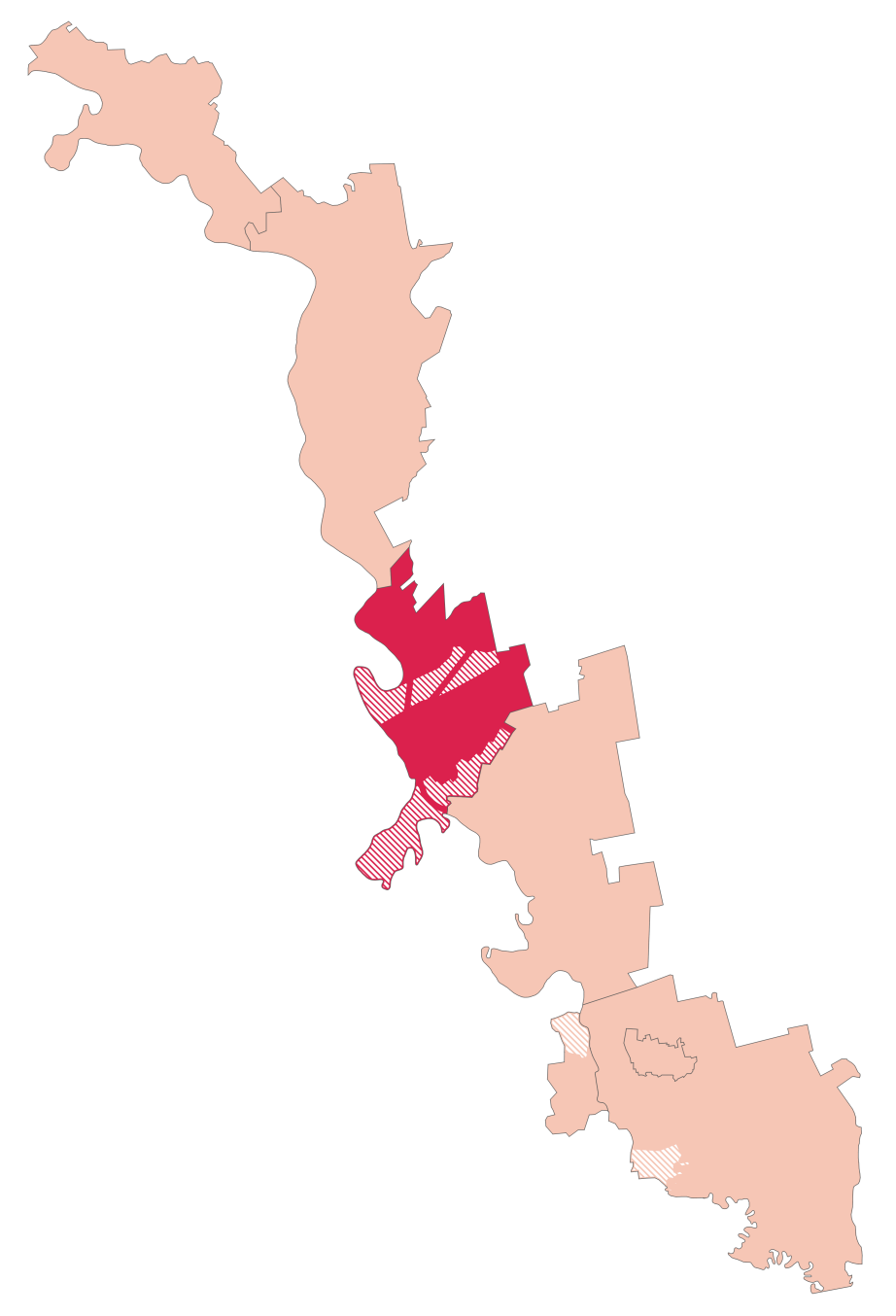
- Country: Moldova
- self-proclaimed state: Transnistria
- Administrative center: Dubăsari

Government
  - Heads of the State Administration of the Dubăsari District and the Dubăsari City: Fedor Kovalev

Area
  - Total: 381.2 km^{2} (147.2 sq mi)

Population (2015)
  - Total: 31,000
- Time zone: UTC+2 (EET)
  - Summer (DST): UTC+3 (EEST)
- Website: http://www.dubossary.ru/

Dubăsari District (Romanian: Raionul Dubăsari, Moldovan Cyrillic: Районул Дубэсарь; Russian: Дубоссарский район; Ukrainian: Дубоссарський район), is an administrative subdivision of Transnistria, Moldova. It is located along the river Dniester, in the center of Transnsitria. Its seat is the city of Dubăsari. The district contains this city and 9 communes (a total of 21 localities, including small villages/hamlets):

Dubăsari

Comisarovca Nouă Bosca Coșnița Nouă Pohrebea Nouă Crasnîi Vinogradari Afanasievca Alexandrovca Nouă Calinovca Lunga Nouă	Doibani I Doibani II Coicova Dubău Goianul Nou Dzerjinscoe Goian Iagorlîc Harmațca	Lunga Țîbuleuca

In addition, the breakaway authorities control the village of Roghi of the Chişinău-controlled Molovata Nouă commune of Dubăsari District. According to the 2004 Census in Transnistria, the population of the sub-district is 36,734, and that of the village Roghi is 715. The exact ethnic composition is available only for the sum: 18,763 (50.1%) Moldovans, 10,594 (28.29%) Ukrainians, 7,125 (19.03%) Russians, 92 (0.25%) Gagauzians, 134 (0.36%) Bulgarians, 46 (0.12%) Roma, 46 (0.12%) Jews, 53 (0.14%) Poles, 185 (0.50%) Belarusians, 63 (0.17%) Germans, 126 (0.34%) Armenians, and 205 (0.56%) others and non-declared. The population of the village of Roghi is almost entirely Moldovan (95.32%).

In 1990–1991, the city of Dubăsari and the surrounding area were occasionally the scene of incidents, which aimed to establish in Transnistria a government that would break away from Moldova. In the 1992 War of Transnistria the city and the surrounding area were a major scene of the fighting.

== List of heads of the state administration of the Dubăsari District and the town of Dubăsari ==
- Eduard Davidovich Kantselevich (~ 2013)
- Fedor Grigoriyevich Kovalev (22 October 2013 – )
