= COVID-19 pandemic in Gagauzia =

Ongoing COVID-19 viral pandemic in Gagauzia

2020 coronavirus pandemic in Gagauzia
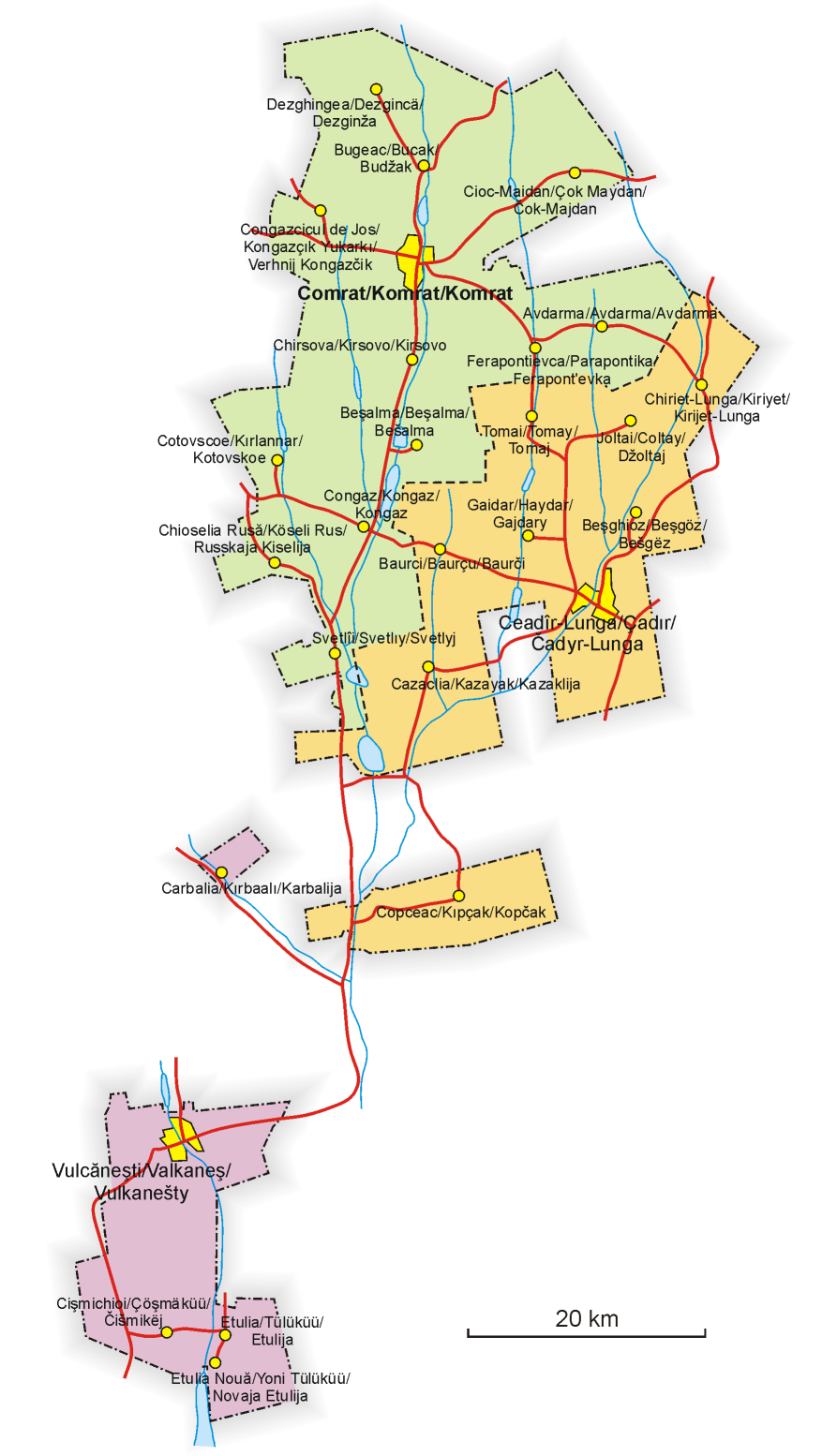
- Map of Gagauzia, an autonomous unit within Moldova
- Disease: COVID-19
- Pathogen: SARS-CoV-2
- Location: Gagauzia, Moldova
- First outbreak: Wuhan, Hubei, China via Turkey or Russia
- Arrival date: 1 April 2020 (6 years, 1 month, 2 weeks and 3 days)
- Confirmed cases: 1,731 (as of 12 August 2020)

The COVID-19 pandemic was confirmed to have reached the Autonomous Territorial Unit of Gagauzia, in Moldova, in April 2020.

== Background ==
On 12 January 2020, the World Health Organization (WHO) confirmed that a novel coronavirus was the cause of a respiratory illness in a cluster of people in Wuhan City, Hubei Province, China, which was reported to the WHO on 31 December 2019.

The case fatality ratio for COVID-19 has been much lower than SARS of 2003, but the transmission has been significantly greater, with a significant total death toll.

== Timeline ==
Gagauzia is an autonomous province of Moldova, a country whose first case was registered on 7 March 2020. During the first few months, dozens of suspected cases were examined, but all of them tested negative. Svetlana Duleva, head of the Health and Social Protection Department of Gagauzia, said that the fact that many Gagauz people that returned home from abroad were not isolating themselves from others for at least two weeks was concerning. She also said that there were many workers and students coming back from Transnistria, which had 7 cases at the moment. Mihail Sirkeli, a Gagauz activist, said that people were only imitating the behavior of the autonomous authorities, which kept organizing meetings with many persons while asking people to stay at home.

Gagauzia's first case was registered on the night of 1 April 2020. The infected man was a truck driver who likely became infected while traveling from Russia to Turkey. He had already come into contact with many of his relatives, putting them all at risk. The man was sent to Chișinău to be hospitalized. Doctors of Gagauzia complained about the aggressive attitude of many truck drivers, who usually do not respect safety measures.

An increase in cases of domestic violence was reported in Gagauzia. Campaigners said they do not have the means and resources to combat the problem due to the COVID-19 lockdown.

== See also ==
- COVID-19 pandemic in Moldova
- COVID-19 pandemic in Transnistria
- COVID-19 pandemic by country and territory
