= Crasnencoe =

Crasnencoe Красненькое (Russian) Красненьке (Ukrainian)
- Commune
- Location within Moldova
- Coordinates: 47°50′47″N 29°8′31″E
- Country (de jure): Moldova
- Country (de facto): Transnistria (Note: Transnistria's political status is disputed. It considers itself to be an independent state, but this is not recognised by any UN member state. The Moldovan government and the international community consider Transnistria a part of Moldova's territory.)
- Elevation: 149 m (489 ft)
- Time zone: UTC+2 (EET)
  - Summer (DST): UTC+3 (EEST)

Crasnencoe (Moldovan Cyrillic: Красненкое, Ukrainian: Красненьке, romanized: Kransnen'ke, Russian: Красненькое, romanized: Krasnen'koe, Polish: Krasneńkie) is a commune in the Rîbnița District of Transnistria, Moldova. It is composed of three villages: Crasnencoe, Dimitrova (Дмитрівка, Димитрова) and Ivanovca (Іванівка, Ивановка). It has since 1990 been administered as a part of the self-proclaimed Pridnestrovian Moldavian Republic (PMR).

According to the 2004 census, the population of the commune was 723 inhabitants, of which 508 (70.26%) were Moldovans (Romanians), 136 (18.81%) Ukrainians and 70 (9.68%) Russians.
