= Sovetscoe =

Sovietscoe Советское (ru) Совєтське (uk)
- Commune
- Location within Moldova
- Coordinates: 47°57′27″N 29°8′40″E
- Country (de jure): Moldova
- Country (de facto): Transnistria (Note: Transnistria's political status is disputed. It considers itself to be an independent state, but this is not recognised by any UN member state. The Moldovan government and the international community consider Transnistria a part of Moldova's territory.)
- Elevation: 219 m (719 ft)
- Time zone: UTC+2 (EET)
  - Summer (DST): UTC+3 (EEST)

Sovetscoe or Sovietscoe (Ukrainian: Совєтське, Sovyets’ke, Russian: Сове́тское, Sovetskoye) is a commune in the Rîbnița District of Transnistria, Moldova. It is composed of two villages, Sovetscoe and Vasilievca (Васильевка). It has since 1990 been administered as a part of the self-proclaimed Pridnestrovian Moldavian Republic.

According to the 2004 census, the village's population was 629, of which 347 (55.16%) were Moldovans (Romanians), 212 (33.7%) Ukrainians and 53 (8.42%) Russians.
