= Ion Solonenco =

Moldovan army officer (1935–2022)

Ion Solonenco OR
- Born: 18 January 1935; Țîbuleuca, Moldavian ASSR, Ukrainian SSR, Soviet Union
- Died: 12 August 2022 (aged 87); Chișinău, Moldova
- Military career
- Allegiance: Moldova
- Branch: Moldovan Ground Forces
- Rank: Brigadier general

Brigadier General Ion Solonenco (18 January 1935 – 12 August 2022) was a senior officer in the Moldovan Ground Forces. In 1996, he held the position of Deputy Minister of National Security. He was then appointed advisor to the general director of the Information and Security Service of the Republic of Moldova.

On 2 February 1999, Solonenco was appointed co-chairman of the Joint Control Commission (JCC). The JCC was created in 1992 immediately after the suspension of the armed conflict between Moldova and Transnistria, it is made up of delegations from Moldova, Transnistria and Russia and the representatives of Ukraine, and the Organization for Security and Co-operation in Europe (OSCE) participate in the work of the JCC as observers.

On 12 January 2005, President Vladimir Voronin awarded Solonenco the Order of Work Glory, for special merits and high professionalism in ensuring state security and prodigious organizational and public activity. Solonenco died in Chișinău on 12 August 2022, at the age of 87.
