= Harmațca =

Harmațca Гармацкое (Russian) Гармацьке (Ukrainian)
- Village
- Location within Moldova
- Coordinates: 47°25′25″N 29°5′24″E
- Country (de jure): Moldova
- Country (de facto): Transnistria (Note: Transnistria's political status is disputed. It considers itself to be an independent state, but this is not recognised by any UN member state. The Moldovan government and the international community consider Transnistria a part of Moldova's territory.)

Area
  - Total: 661 km^{2} (255 sq mi)
- Elevation: 49 m (161 ft)

Population (2004)
  - Total: 4,000
- Time zone: UTC+2 (EET)
  - Summer (DST): UTC+3 (EEST)

Harmațca (Moldovan Cyrillic: Хармацка, Russian: Гармацкое, romanized: Garmatskoye, Ukrainian: Гармацьке, romanized: Harmats'ke) is a village in the Dubăsari District of Transnistria, Moldova. It has since 1990 been administered as a part or the breakaway Pridnestrovian Moldavian Republic.

== History ==
Harmackie or Harmaczka, as it was known in Polish, was a private village of the Lubomirski family, administratively located in the Bracław County in the Bracław Voivodeship in the Lesser Poland Province of the Kingdom of Poland. Following the Second Partition of Poland, it was annexed by Russia. In the 19th century, it remained a possession of Polish nobility, i.e. Grabowski and Świrski families. In the late 19th century, it had a population of 601.

In 1924, it became part of the Moldavian Autonomous Oblast, which was soon converted into the Moldavian Autonomous Soviet Socialist Republic, and the Moldavian Soviet Socialist Republic in 1940 during World War II. From 1941 to 1944, it was administered by Romania as part of the Transnistria Governorate.

According to the 2004 census, the population of the village was 1,271 inhabitants, of which 1,131 (88.98%) were Moldovans (Romanians), 108 (8.49%) Ukrainians and 18 (1.41%) Russians.
