= Doibani I =

Doibani I Дойбаны (Russian) Дойбани (Ukrainian)
- Commune
- Location within Moldova
- Coordinates: 47°23′22″N 29°12′29″E
- Country (de jure): Moldova
- Country (de facto): Transnistria (Note: Transnistria's political status is disputed. It considers itself to be an independent state, but this is not recognised by any UN member state. The Moldovan government and the international community consider Transnistria a part of Moldova's territory.)
- Elevation: 99 m (325 ft)
- Time zone: UTC+2 (EET)
  - Summer (DST): UTC+3 (EEST)

Doibani I (Moldovan Cyrillic: Дойбань, Russian: Дойбаны, Ukrainian: Дойбани) is a commune in the Dubăsari District of Transnistria, Moldova. It is composed of three villages: Coicova (Койковe, Койково), Doibani I and Doibani II. It has since 1990 been administered as a part of the breakaway Pridnestrovian Moldavian Republic. According to the 2004 census, the population of the village was 1,901 inhabitants, of which 925 (48.65%) were Moldovans (Romanians), 754 (39.66%) Ukrainians and 168 (8.83%) Russians.

== History ==
Dojban or Dojbany, as it was known in Polish, was a private village of the Lubomirski family, administratively located in the Bracław County in the Bracław Voivodeship in the Lesser Poland Province of the Kingdom of Poland. Following the Second Partition of Poland, it was annexed by Russia. There were 42 houses in the village as of 1868.

In 1924, it became part of the Moldavian Autonomous Oblast, which was soon converted into the Moldavian Autonomous Soviet Socialist Republic, and the Moldavian Soviet Socialist Republic in 1940 during World War II. From 1941 to 1944, it was administered by Romania as part of the Transnistria Governorate.

According to the 2004 census, the population of the village was 1,901 inhabitants, of which 925 (48.65%) were Moldovans (Romanians), 754 (39.66%) Ukrainians and 168 (8.83%) Russians.
