= Lenin, Transnistria =

Lenin Ленино (Russian) Леніне (Ukrainian)
- Commune
- Location within Moldova
- Coordinates: 47°40′9″N 29°11′26″E
- Country (de jure): Moldova
- Country (de facto): Transnistria (Note: Transnistria's political status is disputed. It considers itself to be an independent state, but this is not recognised by any UN member state. The Moldovan government and the international community consider Transnistria a part of Moldova's territory.)
- Elevation: 119 m (390 ft)
- Time zone: UTC+2 (EET)
  - Summer (DST): UTC+3 (EEST)

Lenin (Moldovan Cyrillic: Ленин, Ukrainian: Леніне, romanized: Lenine, Russian: Ле́нино, Russian: Lénino) is a commune in the Rîbnița District of Transnistria, Moldova. It is composed of four villages: Lenin, Pervomaisc, Pobeda and Stanislavca. It has since 1990 been administered as a part of the self-proclaimed Pridnestrovian Moldavian Republic. According to the 2004 census, the village's population was 635, of which 176 (27.71%) were Moldovans (Romanians), 413 (65.03%) Ukrainians and 41 (6.45%) Russians.
