= Crasnîi Vinogradari =

Crasnîi Vinogradari Кра́сный Виногра́дарь (Russian) Красний Виноградар (Ukrainian)
- Commune
- Location within Moldova
- Coordinates: 47°17′54″N 29°16′41″E
- Country (de jure): Moldova
- Country (de facto): Transnistria (Note: Transnistria's political status is disputed. It considers itself to be an independent state, but this is not recognised by any UN member state. The Moldovan government and the international community consider Transnistria a part of Moldova's territory.)

Government
  - Mayor: Lungu Anatolie, 2000-2005, 2005-prezent
- Elevation: 109 m (358 ft)

Population (2006)
  - Total: 1,200
- Time zone: UTC+2 (EET)
  - Summer (DST): UTC+3 (EEST)

Crasnîi Vinogradari (Moldovan Cyrillic and Russian: Красный Виноградарь, romanized: Krasnyy Vinogradar', Ukrainian: Красний Виноградар, romanized: Krasnyy Vinohradar) is a commune in the Dubăsari District of Transnistria, Moldova. It is composed of five villages: Afanasievca (Афанасіївка, Афанасьевка), Alexandrovca Nouă (Нова Олександрівка, Новая Александровка), Calinovca (Калинівка, Калиновка), Crasnîi Vinogradari and Lunga Nouă (Нова Лунга, Новая Лунга). It has since 1990 been administered as a part of the breakaway Pridnestrovian Moldavian Republic (PMR).

According to the 2004 census, the population of the commune was 1,105 inhabitants, of which 728 (65.88%) were Moldovans (Romanians), 273 (24.7%) Ukrainians and 82 (7.42%) Russians.
