= Blijnii Hutor =

Blijnii Hutor Ближний Хутор Hotarul de-aproape (Romanian) Бли́жній Ху́тір (Ukrainian)
- Village
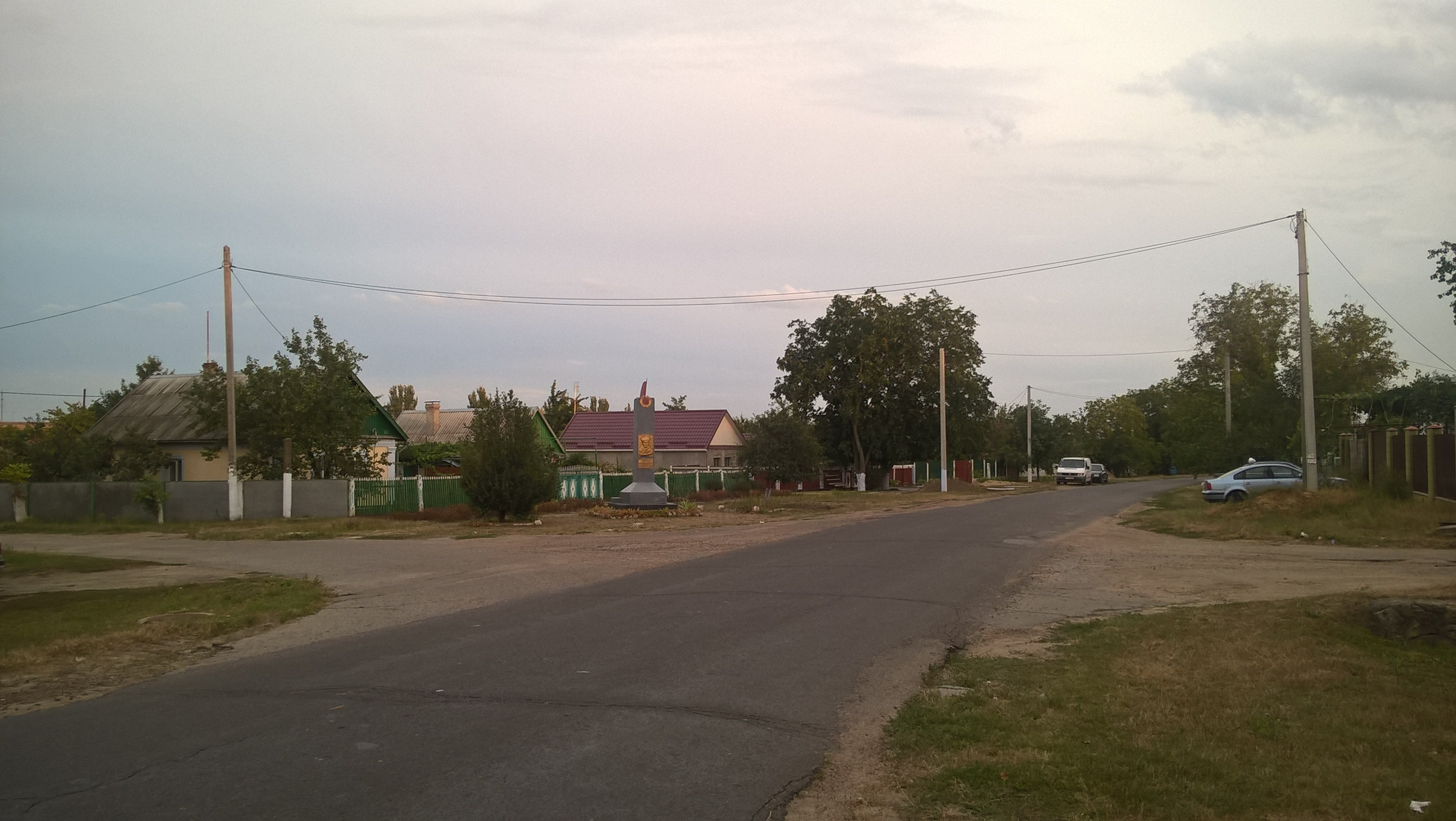

- Location within Moldova
- Coordinates: 46°52′49″N 29°38′40″E
- Country (de jure): Moldova
- Country (de facto): Transnistria (Note: Transnistria's political status is disputed. It considers itself to be an independent state, but this is not recognised by any UN member state. The Moldovan government and the international community consider Transnistria a part of Moldova's territory.)
- Elevation: 52 m (171 ft)
- Time zone: UTC+2 (EET)
  - Summer (DST): UTC+3 (EEST)

Blijnii Hutor (Moldovan Cyrillic and Russian: Ближний Хутор, romanized: Blizhniy Khutor, Ukrainian: Ближній Хутір, romanized: Blyzhniy Khutir, lit. 'the nearby farm') is a village in the Slobozia District of Transnistria. According to the administrative division of Moldova, it belongs to the autonomous territory Stinga Nistrului, however it is de facto a northern suburb of the Transnistrian capital of Tiraspol. According to the 2004 census, the population of the village was 7,291 inhabitants, of which 720 (9.87%) were Moldovans (Romanians), 4,687 (64.28%) Ukrainians and 1,507 (20.66%) Russians.
