= Vlad Grecu =

Moldovan writer

Vlad Grecu (born 1959) is a Moldovan writer.

== Early life ==
Grecu was born in Dubăsari, Moldova. He graduated from the Schools of Plastic Arts of Chișinău (1976) and the Technical University - Civil and Industrial Constructions Faculty (1987).

== Life ==
During the 1992 War of Transnistria, Grecu wrote leaflets for the Moldovan forces fighting against Transnistria. After the war he is living in Chişinău.

== Books ==
- O viziune din focarul conflictului de la Dubăsari (A view from the centre of the Dubăsari conflict) (2005). A memoir of the political conflict in Transnistria.
- Morcovel (2002), a children's book.
- Unde-s zeii popoarelor învinse (2010).
- Somn letargic (2017).
- Fabrica de genii (2018).
- Firingina (2021).
- Pocalul de rubin al elfilor (2024).

THEATER

- Do Major cu Paula (2015.
- Beciul (2016).
- Merele edenice sau nora de la Cluj (2018).
