= Dzerjinscoe =

Dzerjinscoe Дзержинское (Russian)
- Village
- Location within Moldova
- Coordinates: 47°13′22″N 29°10′45″E
- Country (de jure): Moldova
- Country (de facto): Transnistria (Note: Transnistria's political status is disputed. It considers itself to be an independent state, but this is not recognised by any UN member state. The Moldovan government and the international community consider Transnistria a part of Moldova's territory.)
- Elevation: 34 m (112 ft)
- Time zone: UTC+2 (EET)
  - Summer (DST): UTC+3 (EEST)

Dzerjinscoe (Russian: Дзержи́нское, Dzerzhynskoye) is a village in the Dubăsari District of Transnistria, Moldova. It has since 1990 been administered as a part of the breakaway Pridnestrovian Moldavian Republic. As of 2015, the population of Dzerjinscoe is 3.

According to the 2004 census, the population of the village was 1,271 inhabitants, of which 366 (28.79%) were Moldovans (Romanians), 454 (35.71%) Ukrainians and 427 (33.59%) Russians.
