= Broșteni, Transnistria =

Broșteni Броштень (Moldovan Cyrillic) Броштяны (Russian) Броштяни (Ukrainian)
- Village
- Location within Moldova
- Coordinates: 47°52′55″N 29°16′00″E
- Country (de jure): Moldova
- Country (de facto): Transnistria (Note: Transnistria's political status is disputed. It considers itself to be an independent state, but this is not recognised by any UN member state. The Moldovan government and the international community consider Transnistria a part of Moldova's territory.)
- Elevation: 145 m (476 ft)
- Time zone: UTC+2 (EET)
  - Summer (DST): UTC+3 (EEST)

Broșteni (Moldovan Cyrillic: Броштень, Ukrainian: Броштяни, Broshtiany, Russian: Броштяны, Broshtiany) is a village in the Rîbnița District of Transnistria, Moldova. It has since 1990 been administered as a part of the breakaway Pridnestrovian Moldavian Republic (PMR). According to the 2004 census, the village's population was 496, of which 401 (80.84%) were Moldovans (Romanians), 75 (15.12%) Ukrainians and 12 (2.41%) Russians.
