= Slobozia District =

Slobozia
- district
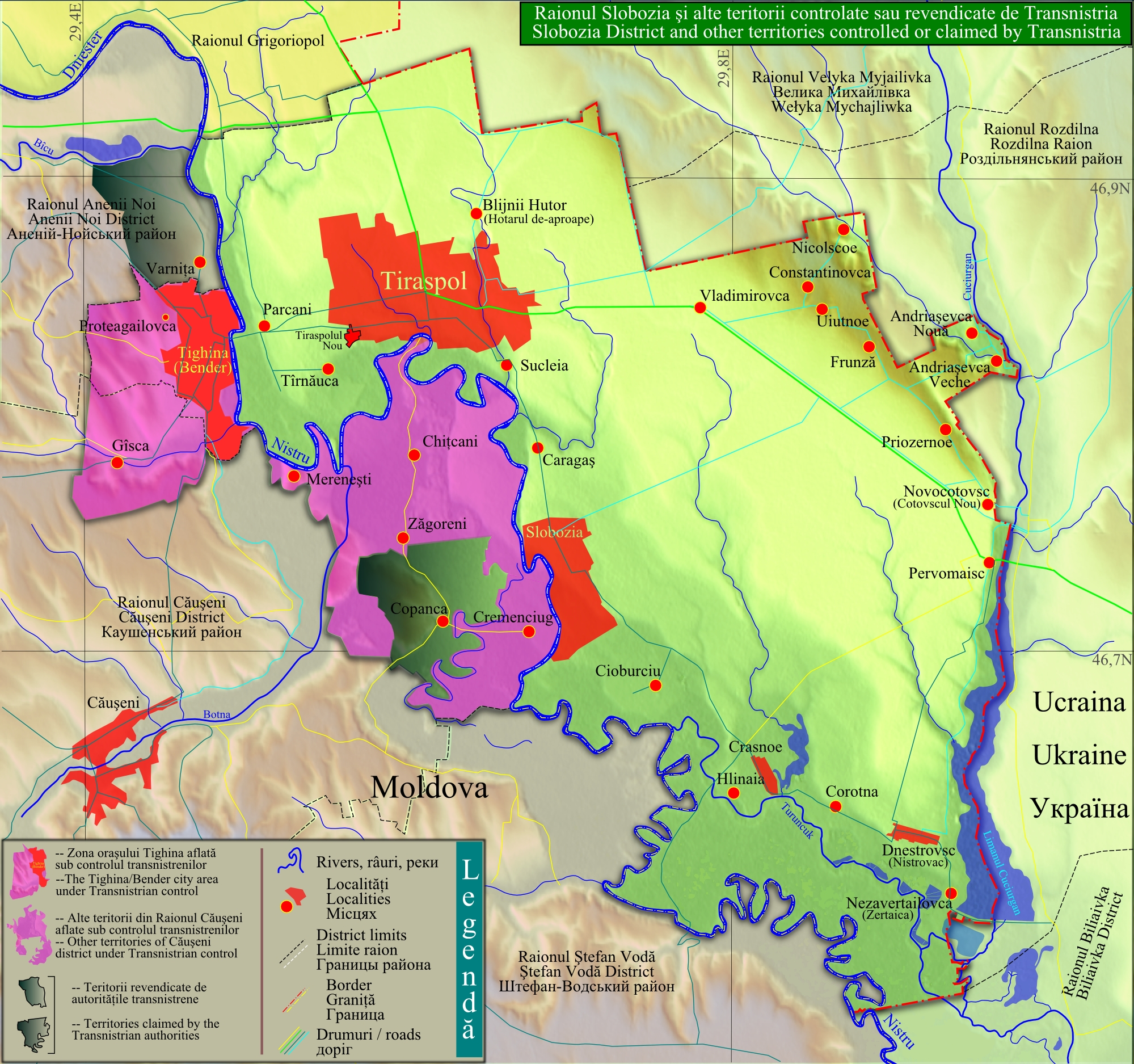
- Country: Moldova
- self-proclaimed state: Transnistria
- Administrative center: Slobozia

Government
  - Heads of the State Administration of the Slobozia District and the Slobozia City: V. D. Televca

Area
  - Total: 873.24 km^{2} (337.16 sq mi)

Population (2015)
  - Total: 84,000
- Time zone: UTC+2 (EET)
  - Summer (DST): UTC+3 (EEST)

Slobozia District (Romanian: Raionul Slobozia; Russian: Слободзейский район, romanized: Slobodzeysky rayon; Ukrainian: Слободзейський район, romanized: Slobodzeys'kyy rayon) is a district of Transnistria. It is the southernmost district of Transnistria, located mostly south of Tiraspol. Its seat is the city of Slobozia, located at 46°44′N 29°42′E, on the river Dniester. The district contains 4 cities/towns and 12 communes (a total of 24 localities, including small villages/hamlets):

Slobozia
Crasnoe
Dnestrovsc
Tiraspolul Nou

Blijnii Hutor Caragaș Cioburciu Corotna Frunză Andriașevca Nouă Andriașevca Veche Novocotovsc Priozernoe Uiutnoe Novosavițcaia, loc. st. c. f.	Hlinaia, Slobozia Nezavertailovca Parcani Pervomaisc Sucleia Tîrnauca Vladimirovca Constantinovca Nicolscoe

In addition, the breakaway authorities control the commune of Chițcani of Căușeni District, on the western bank of the river Dniester.

According to the 2004 Census in Transnistria, the population of the district including Chițcani is 95,742. The ethnic composition is: 39,722 (41.49%) Moldovans, 25,436 (26.57%) Russians, 20,772 (21.70%) Ukrainians, 7,323 (7.65%) Bulgarians, 512 (0.53%) Gagauzes, 496 (0.52%) Germans, 475 (0.50%) Belarusians, 35 (0.04%) Jews and 971 (1.01%) others and non-declared. The population of Chițcani is of 9,266 inhabitants.

The city of Slobozia had a population of 16,062 in 2004, including 7,315 Moldovans (45.54%), 6,507 Russians (40.51%), 1,696 Ukrainians (10.56%), 97 Gagauzes (0.6%), 94 Bulgarians (0.59%), 72 Germans (0.45%), 61 Belarusians (0.38%), 3 Jews (0.02%) and 217 others and non-declared (1.35%).

== List of heads of administration of Slobozia District and the town of Slobozia ==
- Sergei Diligul (? – 12 October 2012)
- Vitaliy Dmitrievich Televka (9 November 2012 – 22 October 2013)
- Leonid Nazarovich Petriman (22 October 2013 – )
