= Dubăsari =

Dubăsari Dubossary Дубоссары
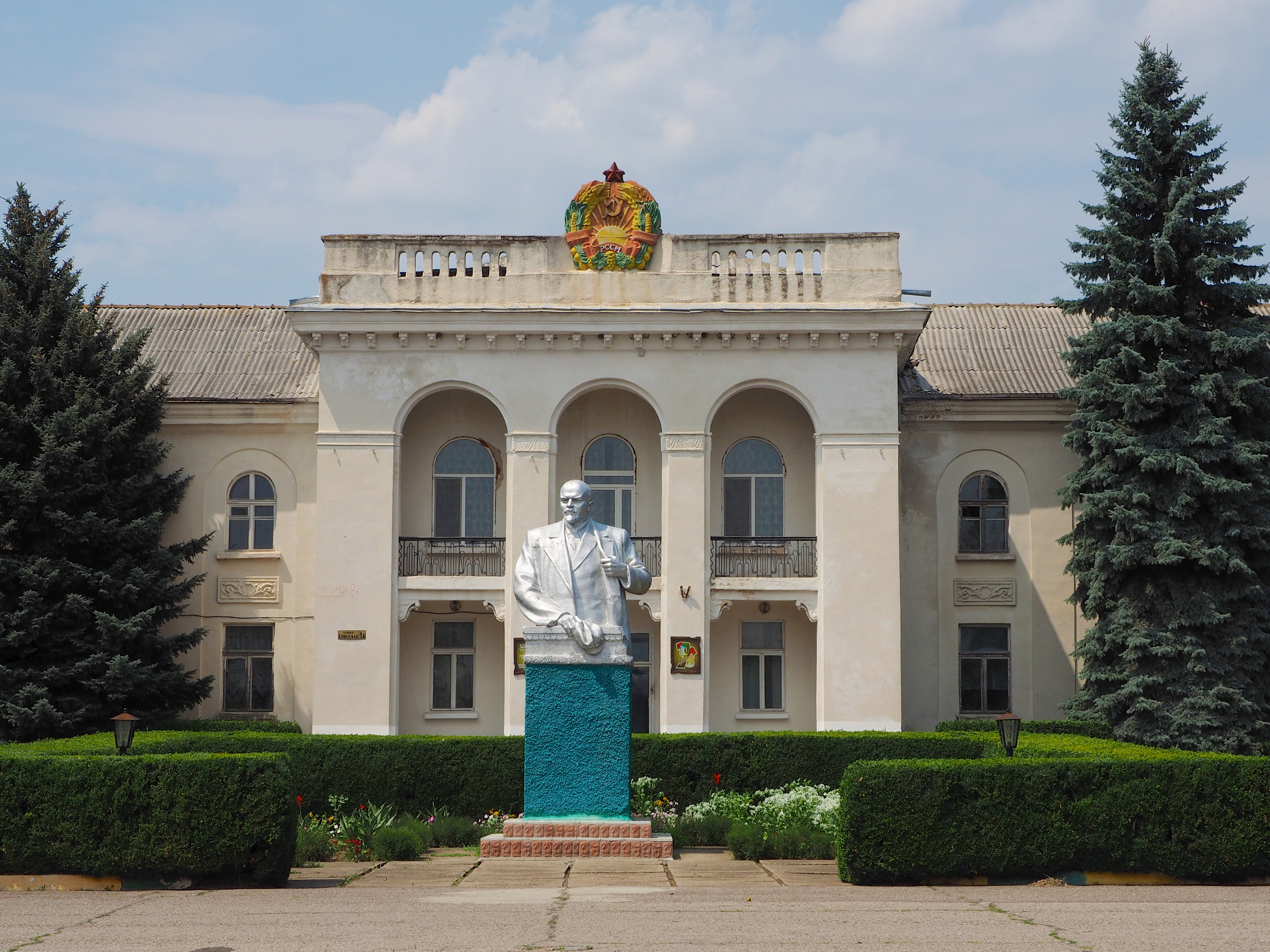
- Liberal Arts College

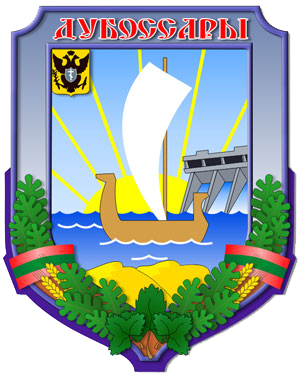
- Flag Coat of arms

- Location within Transnistria
- Coordinates: 47°16′N 29°10′E
- Country (de jure): Moldova
- Country (de facto): Transnistria (Note: Transnistria's political status is disputed. It considers itself to be an independent state, but this is not recognised by any UN member state. The Moldovan government and the international community consider Transnistria a part of Moldova's territory.)

Population (2004)
  - Total: 28,500
- Time zone: UTC+2 (EET)
  - Summer (DST): UTC+3 (EEST)
- Climate: Dfa
- Website: dubossary.ru

Dubăsari (Romanian pronunciation: [dubəˈsarʲ]; Moldovan Cyrillic: Дубэсарь) or Dubossary (Russian: Дубоссары; Ukrainian: Дубоcсари; Yiddish: דובאסאר) is a city in Transnistria, with a population of 23,650. Claimed by both the Republic of Moldova and the unrecognized Pridnestrovian Moldavian Republic, the city is under the latter's administration, and functions as the seat of the Dubăsari District.

== Name ==
The Romanian word dubăsari is the plural form of the archaic Moldavian dialect word dubăsar, "dubasă (coracle) builder" or "boatman". The town was named after the older village Dubăsari (now Dubăsarii Vechi, "Old Dubăsarii"; -ii marks the plural form with a definite article, as if it were "the dubăsari"), and it was initially called Dubăsarii Noi, "New Dubăsarii".

== History ==
Dubăsari is the site of one of the oldest settlements in Moldova, and the Transnistrian region. Stone Age artifacts have been found in the area, and there are several kurgans (presumed Scythian) around the city. First mentions of modern Dubăsari date to the beginning of the 16th century, as a fair populated by Moldavian peasants. The settlement became part of the Russian Empire in 1792 and was granted city status in 1795. It was part of Kherson Governorate from 1803 to 1922.

The murder of a Ukrainian boy, Mikhail Rybachenko, in Dubăsari became one of the triggers of the Kishinev pogrom after the Bessarabetz paper insinuated that he had been murdered by the Jewish community for the purpose of using their blood in the preparation of matzo for Passover. Unlike in Chișinău (Kishinev), the authorities at Dubăsari acted to prevent the pogrom in the town.

From 1924 to 1940, Dubăsari was part of the Soviet-created Moldavian ASSR. The town was heavily industrialized during the pre-WWII period.

=== World War II and the Holocaust ===
In the course of World War II, in 1940, when Bessarabia was occupied by the Soviet Union, Dubăsari became part of the newly created Moldavian SSR.

Before World War II, Dubăsari had a substantial Jewish population. In 1939, 2,198 Jews lived in the town, comprising approximately 49 percent of its population. Following the Axis invasion of the Soviet Union, German and Romanian forces occupied Dubăsari on 24 July 1941. Some of the town's Jews had fled eastward before the occupation, while many Jewish men had been drafted into the Red Army.

After the occupation, Romanian authorities established a ghetto consisting of two streets. Approximately 2,500 Jews from Dubăsari and the surrounding district were confined there. Pavel Tolmachinski was appointed head of the ghetto. Prisoners were required to wear a yellow Star of David and were prohibited from leaving the ghetto, which was guarded by Romanian soldiers.

In late August or early September 1941, a detachment of Einsatzkommando 12, part of Einsatzgruppe D, arrived in Dubăsari under the command of SS-Obersturmführer Max Drexel. Seven execution pits were dug near a former tobacco factory on the northeastern outskirts of the town. On 12 September, the inhabitants of the ghetto were taken to the tobacco factory and then to the pits, where they were shot by Einsatzkommando 12. German personnel carried out the killings with assistance from Romanian authorities and local auxiliary police.

Further mass shootings followed. Around 20 September, approximately 1,000 to 1,500 Jews brought from other localities, including Kotovsk, were murdered at the same site. For approximately another ten days, Jewish prisoners transported to Dubăsari from other districts were also killed there. Einsatzkommando 12 left the town on 28 September 1941.

Dubăsari was subsequently incorporated into the Romanian-administered Transnistria Governorate. The town was recaptured by the Red Army on 12 April 1944.

=== Moldavian SSR and post-secession ===
In 1951–1954, the Dubăsari Dam and a 48 MW hydroelectric power plant was constructed, and the Dubăsari Reservoir was formed.

Dubăsari and its suburbs were the sites of major conflict during 1990–1992 that eventually culminated in the War of Transnistria (1992). Since then, it has been controlled by the breakaway administration of Transnistria, and tensions have risen most recently during the 2022 Russian invasion of Ukraine.

The city's economy was significantly damaged during the war in 1992.

== Climate ==
Climate data for Dubăsari (1991–2020, extremes 1923–1940 and 1957–2021)
Month	Jan	Feb	Mar	Apr	May	Jun	Jul	Aug	Sep	Oct	Nov	Dec	Year
Record high °C (°F)	16.8 (62.2)	21.1 (70.0)	25.5 (77.9)	31.8 (89.2)	36.4 (97.5)	38.6 (101.5)	40.6 (105.1)	39.8 (103.6)	38.2 (100.8)	33.0 (91.4)	30.0 (86.0)	17.7 (63.9)	40.4 (104.7)
Mean daily maximum °C (°F)	1.3 (34.3)	3.8 (38.8)	9.9 (49.8)	17.5 (63.5)	23.5 (74.3)	27.5 (81.5)	29.8 (85.6)	29.4 (84.9)	23.5 (74.3)	16.3 (61.3)	8.7 (47.7)	3.2 (37.8)	16.2 (61.2)
Daily mean °C (°F)	−1.7 (28.9)	−0.1 (31.8)	4.7 (40.5)	11.3 (52.3)	17.1 (62.8)	21.2 (70.2)	23.3 (73.9)	22.7 (72.9)	17.2 (63.0)	10.8 (51.4)	5.1 (41.2)	0.2 (32.4)	11.0 (51.8)
Mean daily minimum °C (°F)	−4.4 (24.1)	−3.2 (26.2)	0.5 (32.9)	5.8 (42.4)	11.3 (52.3)	15.5 (59.9)	17.5 (63.5)	16.7 (62.1)	11.9 (53.4)	6.5 (43.7)	2.2 (36.0)	−2.3 (27.9)	6.5 (43.7)
Record low °C (°F)	−29.2 (−20.6)	−29.6 (−21.3)	−20.7 (−5.3)	−7.3 (18.9)	−0.1 (31.8)	3.3 (37.9)	9.2 (48.6)	6.7 (44.1)	−3.2 (26.2)	−6.6 (20.1)	−18.9 (−2.0)	−22.8 (−9.0)	−29.6 (−21.3)
Average precipitation mm (inches)	36 (1.4)	28 (1.1)	30 (1.2)	37 (1.5)	55 (2.2)	60 (2.4)	67 (2.6)	46 (1.8)	49 (1.9)	40 (1.6)	43 (1.7)	48 (1.9)	539 (21.2)
Average precipitation days (≥ 1.0 mm)	7	5	6	6	8	8	7	5	5	5	6	6	74
Average relative humidity (%)	84	81	76	67	65	66	66	66	70	76	83	85	74
Source 1: NCEI
Source 2: Serviciul Hidrometeorologic de Stat (extremes, relative humidity)

== Population ==
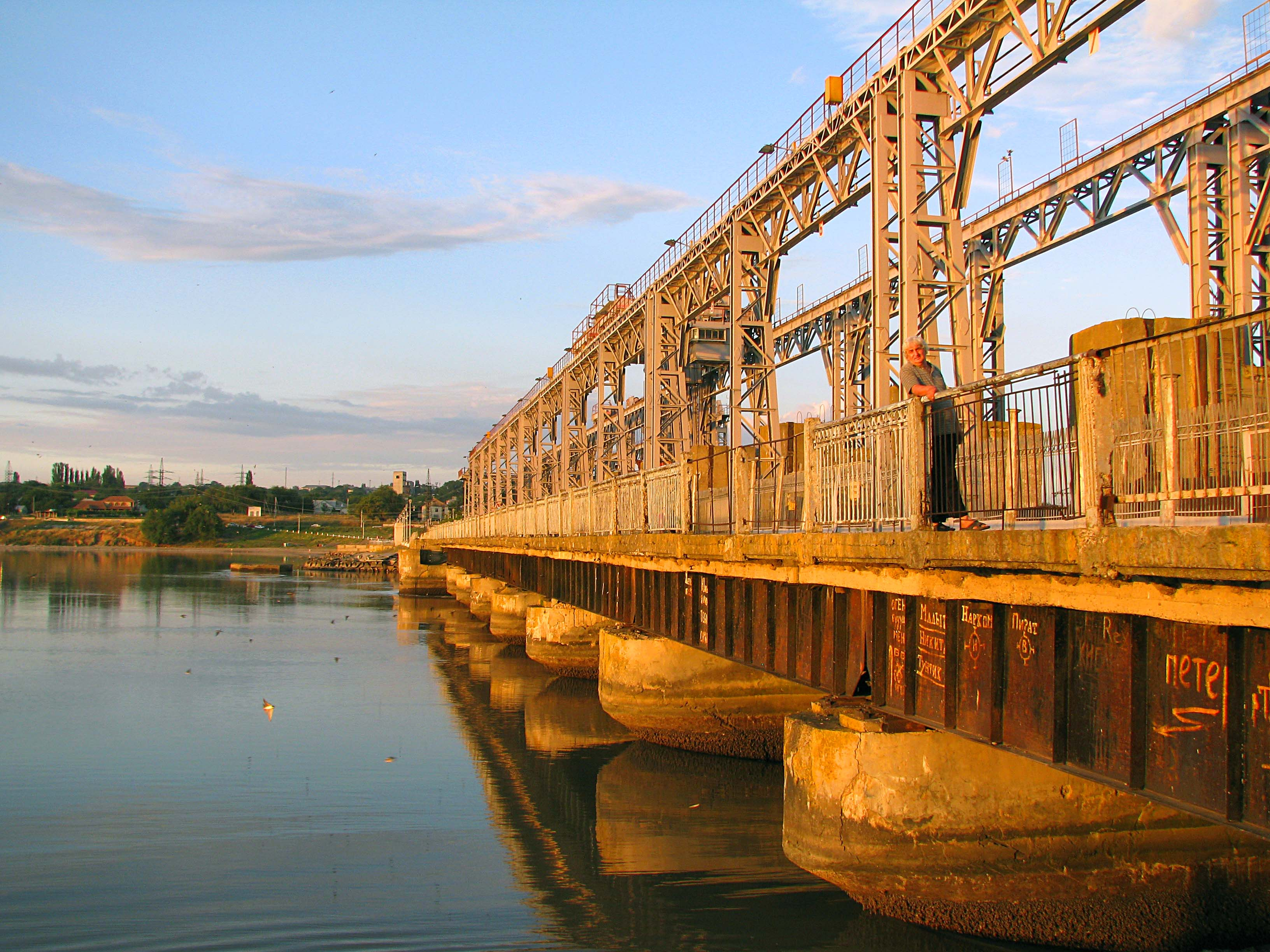
Dubăsari hydroelectric dam

In 1989, the population of the city was 35,806, including 15,414 Moldovans (Romanians) (43.05%), 10,718 Ukrainians (29.93%), 8,087 Russians (22.59%), and 1,587 others (4.43%). According to the 2004 Census in Transnistria, the city had 23,650 inhabitants, including 8,954 Moldovans (37.86%), 8,062 Ukrainians (34.09%), 5,891 Russians (24.91%), 153 Belarusians, 104 Bulgarians, 90 Armenians, 49 Poles, 66 Gagauzians, 46 Jews, 39 Germans, 31 Gypsies, and 165 others and non-declared.

== Notable natives ==
- Victor Covalenco (born 1975), Moldovan decathlete
- Louis Filler (1911–1998), American teacher and scholar
- Igor Gorgan (born 1969), Moldovan military officer
- Vlad Grecu (born 1959), Moldovan writer
- Nikolay Iov (born 1990), Moldovan-Russian powerlifter and musician
- Yulia Lisnik (born 1966), retired Moldovan race walker
- Anna Odobescu (born 1991), Moldovan singer and actress
- Mykhaylo Okhendovsky (born 1973), Ukrainian lawyer
- Igor Pugaci (born 1975), retired Moldovan road bicycle racer
- Dan Pușcaș (born 2001), Moldovan professional footballer
- Pyotr Rachkovsky (1853–1910), chief of the Okhrana, the secret police in the Russian Empire
- Nikolay Sklifosovsky (1836–1904), Russian surgeon and physiologist

== In fiction ==
- The Sisters of the Winter Wood by Rena Rossner is set in Dubăsari, before and during the 1903 Kishinev pogrom.
