= Hlinaia, Slobozia, Transnistria =

Hlinaia Глиное (Russian) Глинне (Ukrainian)
- Village
- Location within Moldova
- Coordinates: 46°38′48″N 29°48′31″E
- Country (de jure): Moldova
- Country (de facto): Transnistria (Note: Transnistria's political status is disputed. It considers itself to be an independent state, but this is not recognised by any UN member state. The Moldovan government and the international community consider Transnistria a part of Moldova's territory.)
- Elevation: 7 m (23 ft)
- Time zone: UTC+2 (EET)
  - Summer (DST): UTC+3 (EEST)

Hlinaia (Moldovan Cyrillic: Хлиная, Russian: Глиное, romanized: Glinoye, Ukrainian: Глинне, romanized: Glinne) is a village in the Slobozia District of Transnistria, Moldova. It has since 1990 been administered as a part of the breakaway Transnistrian Moldovan Republic. In the 19th century, the village was named Glücksthal and was populated by German Lutheran colonists.

According to the Soviet census of 1939, the population of the village was 7,308 inhabitants, of which 3,469 (47.47%) were Moldovans (Romanians), 2,189 (29.95%) were Ukrainians and 1,327 (18.16%) were Russians. According to the unofficial census of 2004, the village had 5,251 inhabitants; more precisely: 2,494 or 47.49% Moldovans (Romanians), 1,448 or 27.57% Ukrainians, 1,186 or 22.58% Russians, 34 Germans, 25 Belarusians, 22 Bulgarians, 18 Gagauz and 24 people of other ethnicities.
