= Nezavertailovca =

Nezavertailovca Незавертайловка
- Village
- Interactive map of Nezavertailovca
- Location within Moldova
- Coordinates: 46°36′0″N 29°55′59″E
- Country (de jure): Moldova
- Country (de facto): Transnistria (Note: Transnistria's political status is disputed. It considers itself to be an independent state, but this is not recognised by any UN member state. The Moldovan government and the international community consider Transnistria a part of Moldova's territory.)
- Elevation: 3 m (9.8 ft)
- Time zone: UTC+2 (EET)
  - Summer (DST): UTC+3 (EEST)

Nezavertailovca (Moldovan Cyrillic and Russian: Незавертайловка, romanized: Nazavertaylovka, Ukrainian: Незавертайлівка, romanized: Nezavertaylivka) is a village and commune in the Slobozia District of Transnistria, Moldova. It has since 1990 been administered as a part of the breakaway Transnistrian Moldovan Republic.

According to the Soviet census of 1939, the population of the town was 6,321 inhabitants, of which 3,887 (61.49%) were Moldovans (Romanians), 1,990 (31.48%) Ukrainians and 377 (5.96%) Russians.

According to the 2004 census, the population of the village was 4,742 inhabitants, of which 2,723 (57.42%) were Moldovans (Romanians), 1,100 (23.19%) Ukrainians and 866 (18.26%) Russians.
