= Sucleia =

Village in Transnistria

Sucleia Суклея (Russian) Суклея (Ukrainian) Суклея (Moldovan)
- Village
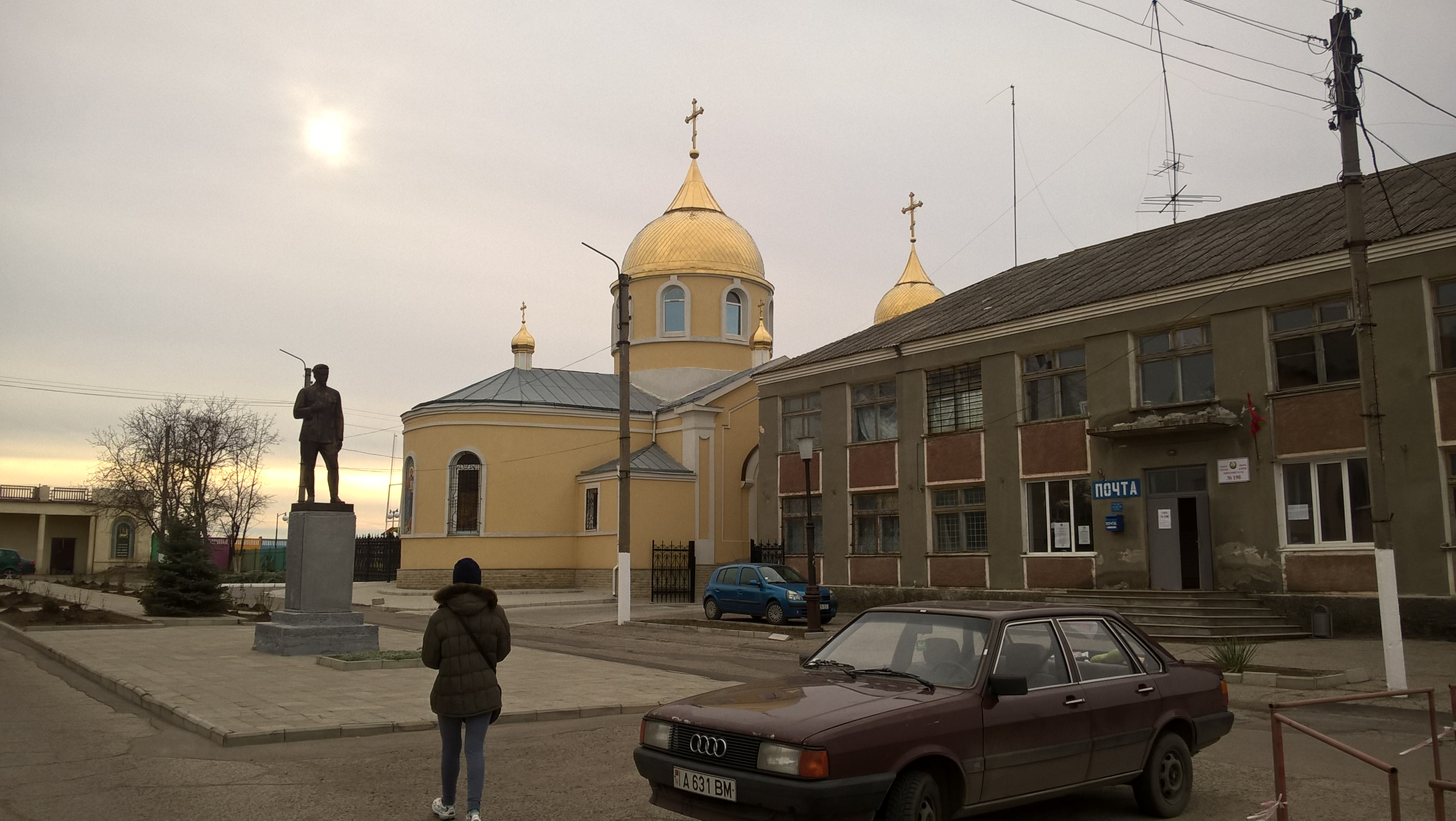

- Location within Moldova
- Coordinates: 46°49′06″N 29°40′1″E
- Country (de jure): Moldova
- Country (de facto): Transnistria (Note: Transnistria's political status is disputed. It considers itself to be an independent state, but this is not recognised by any UN member state. The Moldovan government and the international community consider Transnistria a part of Moldova's territory.)
- First mentioned: 1752
- Elevation: 21 m (69 ft)
- Time zone: UTC+2 (EET)
  - Summer (DST): UTC+3 (EEST)

Sucleia (Moldovan Cyrillic, Russian, and Ukrainian: Суклея, romanized: Sukleya) is a village in the Slobozia District of Transnistria, part of the internationally-recognised territory of Moldova and part of the autonomous territory Stinga Nistrului. Until 1990, it was part of the Slobodzeya district of the Moldavian SSR. It is a suburb of Tiraspol, the capital of Transnistria, and a part of the Tiraspol-Bendery agglomeration.

The village is mentioned in documents as early as 1752. Its name was likely derived from the word Saklya, a stone dwelling of the Crimean Tatars. A wooden church was built in the name of Saint Nicholas. It was burned down in 1787 by the Tatars. In 1789, 100 families of Cossack origin settled onto the site of the farm and church that had been burned.

In 1791, the land was partitioned from the Ottoman Empire to the Russian Empire. The following year, Count Alexander Suvorov built Sredinnaya fortress on the left bank, northwest of the village.

The local football side FC Sucleia play in the third tier of Moldovan Football.

== Demographics ==
In 1793, the population was 315, in 71 households. By the mid-18th century, the population was 717 people.

According to the 2004 census, the population of the village was 10,001 inhabitants, of which 3,483 (34.82%) were Moldovans (Romanians), 3,054 (30.53%) Ukrainians and 2,868 (28.67%) Russians.
