= Goian, Transnistria =

Goian Гояны (Russian) Гояни (Ukrainian)
- Commune
- Location within Moldova
- Coordinates: 47°22′40″N 29°9′47″E
- Country (de jure): Moldova
- Country (de facto): Transnistria (Note: Transnistria's political status is disputed. It considers itself to be an independent state, but this is not recognised by any UN member state. The Moldovan government and the international community consider Transnistria a part of Moldova's territory.)

Government
  - Mayor: Bronici Fiodor Ivanovici

Area
  - Total: 34 km^{2} (13 sq mi)
- Elevation: 40 m (130 ft)

Population (2004)
  - Total: 616
- Time zone: UTC+2 (EET)
  - Summer (DST): UTC+3 (EEST)

Goian (Moldovan Cyrillic: Гоян, Russian: Гояны, romanized: Goyany, Ukrainian: Гояни, romanized: Hoyany) is a commune in Transnistria, Moldova. It is composed of two villages, Goian and Iagorlîc (Ягорлик, Ягорлык). It has since 1990 been administered as a part of the breakaway Pridnestrovian Moldovan Republic.

According to the 2004 census, the village's population was 684, of which 612 (89.47%) were Moldovans (Romanians), 34 (4.97%) Ukrainians and 34 (4.97%) Russians.
