= Bratslav Voivodeship =

Voivodeship of the Grand Duchy of Lithuania then of the Kingdom of Poland

Coordinates: 48°49′10″N 28°56′41″E

Bracław Voivodeship Latin: Palatinatus Braclaviensis Polish: Województwo bracławskie Ukrainian: Брацлавське воєводство
- Voivodeship of Lithuania (1566–1569), then Poland (1569–1793)
- 1566–1793
- Coat of arms

- The Bracław Voivodeship (red) in the Polish–Lithuanian Commonwealth in 1635.
- Capital: Bracław (Bratslav); Winnica (Vinnytsia)
- Area
- 31,660 km^{2} (12,220 sq mi)
- History
  - Established: 1566
  - Third partition: 24 October 1793
- Political subdivisions: counties: 2 (3 since 1791)
Preceded by	Succeeded by
Grand Duchy of Lithuania	Bratslav Viceroyalty
- Today part of: Ukraine; Moldova¹
- ¹ Northern Transnistria.

The Bratslav Voivodeship, (Note: Ukrainian: Брацлавське воєводство, romanized: Bratslavske vojevodstvo.) also known as the Bracław Voivodeship, (Note: Polish: Województwo bracławskie.) was an administrative division established in 1566 in the Grand Duchy of Lithuania. It was transferred to the Crown of the Kingdom of Poland following the Union of Lublin in 1569 and formed, together with the Podolian Voivodeship, the historical region of Podolia within the Lesser Poland Province.

The voivodeship's official capital was Bratslav (Polish: Bracław), although its voivodes also resided in Vinnytsia (Polish: Winnica) and local sejmiks were held there. It was principally divided into the counties (powiaty) of Bratslav and Vinnytsia, with Zvenyhorodka (Polish: Zwinogródek) forming a district or, according to some sources, a separate county. A further Boh County was established by the Great Sejm in 1791 but was never implemented because of the Polish–Russian War of 1792. The voivodeship ceased to exist in 1793, after which its territory came under the Russian Empire. Its former territory is now in Ukraine and northern Transnistria in Moldova.

== Overview ==
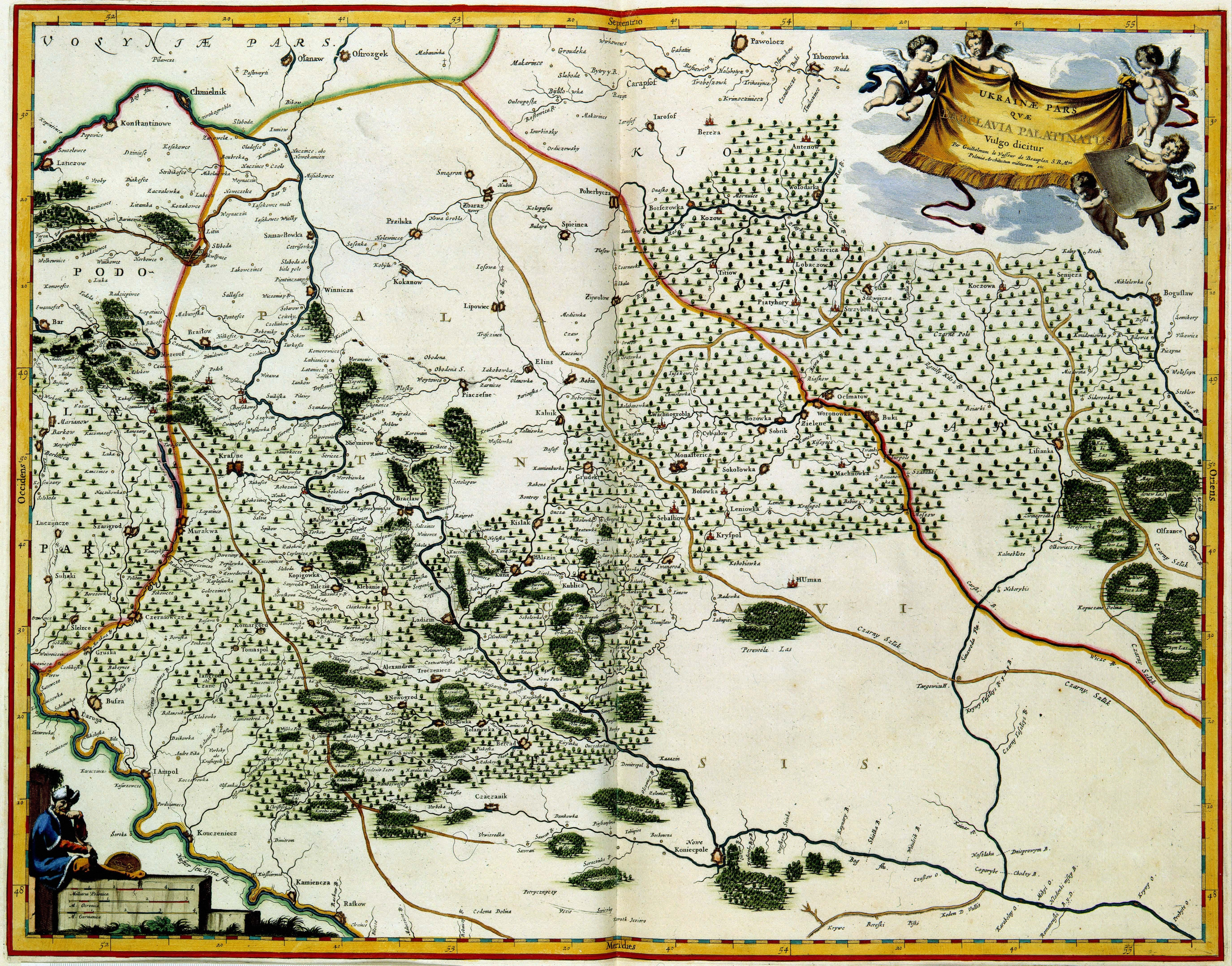
Map of the Bratslav Voivodeship from 1648

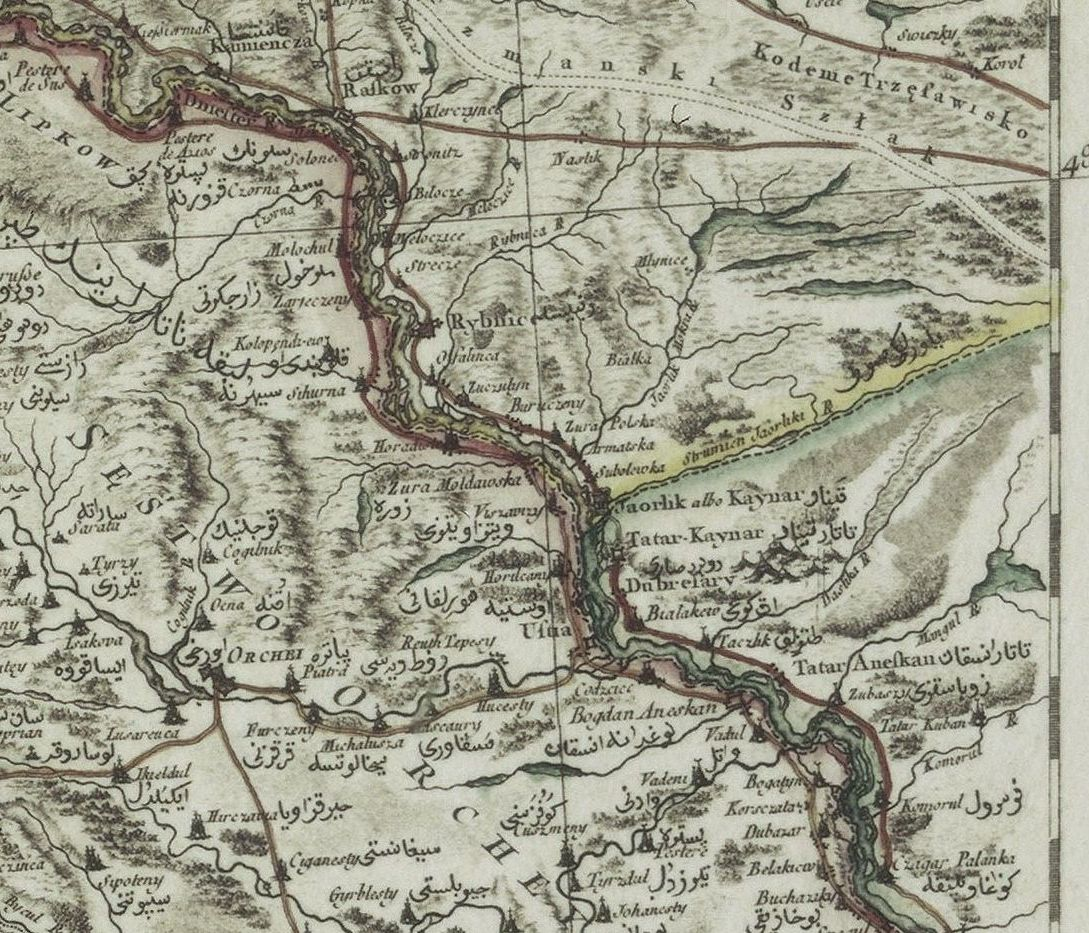
Southernmost fragment of the Bratslav Voivodeship on a map from 1772

Together with the Podolian Voivodeship it formed the historical region of Podolia and part of a bigger Lesser Poland Province of the Kingdom of Poland.

Officially, the capital of the voivodeship was in Braclaw (today Bratslav), but local voivodes also resided in Winnica (Vinnytsia). It was divided into County of Braclaw and County of Winnica. The County of Braclaw itself was divided into two districts—Braclaw and Zwinogródek (some sources claim there was a separate County of Zwinogródek). In 1791, the Great Sejm also created Boh County (Polish: powiat nadbohski), but it was never created due to the Polish–Russian War of 1792. Braclaw Voivodeship had two senators—the Voivode and the Castellan of Braclaw. It also had six deputies to the Sejm—two from Braclaw County, two from Winnica County, and two from District of Zwinogródek. Local sejmiks took place in Winnica. Today the region belongs to Ukraine and Transnistria in Moldova.

Zygmunt Gloger in his monumental book Historical Geography of the Lands of Old Poland gives a detailed description of the Bratslav Voivodeship:

After the Union of Lublin, the province of Podolia was annexed by the Kingdom of Poland. Soon afterwards, Ukrainian Podolia, located lower than the Podolian Voivodeship, between the Dniestr and the Boh rivers, was turned into Bratslav Voivodeship. It had three castles at Bratslav, Winnica and Zwinogrod (...) In 1570, a special royal commission was created to mark the borders of the voivodeship. Its western boundary was marked by the Murachwa river, and in the southeast, it was separated from Wallachia by the Dniestr. The commission marked northern border of the voivodeship along the Black Tatar Trail, and to settle arguments between Braclaw and Kijow Voivodeships, King Stefan Batory in 1584 stated that boundary line was to be marked by the Uhorski Tykicz river (...)

In the late 16th century, most of Braclaw Voivodeship was a depopulated wild field. Political and social life existed only in the agricultural belt, located in the immediate vicinity of royal castles. Settlers however began to move into the desert, even along southern border of the province, in the area called Pobereze (...) After the Union of Lublin, when Ukrainian lands were annexed by the Crown of the Kingdom of Poland, life became more organized, with Polish-style starostas, voivodes, nobility, sejmiks, and courts (...)

The County of Winnica was smaller, but more populated. It had the area of 200 sq. miles, in northwestern corner of the voivodeship, along the Boh river. The County of Braclaw had the area of 420 sq. miles, and consisted of two districts - Bracław and Zwinogrod. The district of Zwinogrod covered the desert of the Blue Waters (see also Battle of Blue Waters), but due to destruction of the Zwinogrod Castle, it did not emerge as a separate county (...) In 1584, Stefan Batory divided this area between Braclaw and Kijow Voivodeship, along the Hirskyi Tykicz river (...)

In 1569, first voivode of Braclaw was Prince Roman Sanguszko, while first castellan was Knyaz Jedrzej Kapusta. In 1589 Polish Sejm ordered that all official documents in Braclaw Voivodeship should be written in Old East Slavic language (...) The voivodeship had two senators (the voivode and the castellan of Braclaw), six deputies to the Sejm, and two deputies to the Lesser Poland Tribunal at Lublin. Furthermore, like in neighbouring Podole Voivodeship, Braclaw had its own border judges, who cooperated with officials of the Ottoman Porte and the Crimean Khanate, solving conflicts between citizens of the two countries (...)

In 1598 the Sejm ordered that all courts and sejmiks be moved from Braclaw to Winnica. As a result, Winnica came to be regarded the capital of the voivodeship. Since in the 18th century the population of the region grew, in 1791 the Sejm created another county, called Boh County, increasing number of deputies from the voivodeship from six to eight. After the Partitions of Poland, Russian authorities created Braclaw Governorate (1793 - 1796), whose lands were then divided between Podolia Governorate, Volhynian Governorate, and Kiev Governorate (...)

According to the 1625 census, Braclaw Voivodeship had 285 villages, but its population grew so fast that in the early 1790s, the number of villages grew to 1,500 (...) Before the Union of Lublin, there were some 30 castles, forts and strongholds in the province. Fifty years after the union, the number of castles grew significantly. Most of them were private, with the strongest one being Uman (...) In the 18th century, the voivodeship had several grand residences of Polish magnates, among them was Zofiowka of the Potocki family, located in close proximity to Uman.

== Municipal government ==
Voivodeship Governor (Wojewoda) seat:

- Bracław (Bratslav)

Regional council (sejmik generalny) for all Ruthenian lands

- Sądowa Wisznia (Sudova Vyshnia)

Regional council (sejmik poselski i deputacki) seats:

- Winnica (Vinnytsia)

== Administrative division ==
Right-bank Ukraine in 1764. Podolia Voivodeship (western Podolia) Bratslav Voivodeship (eastern Podolia) South Kyiv Voivodeship

- Bracław County (Powiat bracławski), Bracław (Bratslav)
- Winnica County (Powiat winnicki), Winnica (Vinnytsia)
- Zwinogrodek District or Zwinogródek County (powiat zwinogrodzki), Zvenyhorodka
- Boh County (powiat nadbohski), created in 1791,

== Voivodes ==
- Roman Sanguszko (16th century)
- Aleksander Zasławski (1628–?)
- Stanisław "Rewera" Potocki (1631–1636)
- Adam Kisiel (1647–?)
- Andrzej Potocki (1662–?)
- Stanisław Lubomirski (1764–?)

== Neighbouring voivodeships and regions ==
- Podolian Voivodeship
- Kijów Voivodeship
- Jedysan
- Moldavia

== Sources ==
- Braclaw Voivodeship, description by Zygmunt Gloger
- Central European Superpower, Henryk Litwin, BUM Magazine, October 2016.
