= Gustav Walter =

Austrian opera singer

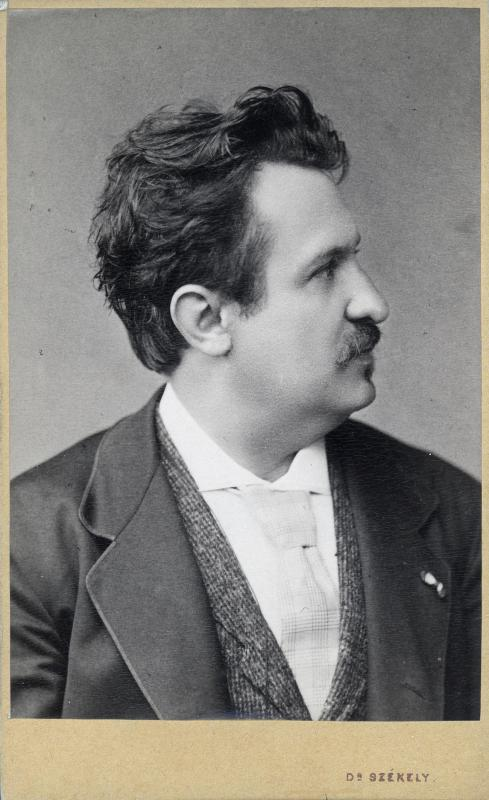
- Born: February 11, 1834
- Died: January 31, 1910 (aged 75)
- Occupation: Lyric tenor

Gustav Walter (11 February 1834, Bílina, Bohemia – 31 January 1910, Vienna) was a German (from Bohemia) operatic lyric tenor who sang leading roles for more than 30 years at the Vienna Staatsoper in Austria. He was a highly regarded interpreter of the vocal music of Wolfgang Amadeus Mozart and the lighter tenor roles composed by Richard Wagner. Walther also created the role of Assad in the world premiere of Karl Goldmark's Die Königin von Saba and performed in some Italian and French operas.

After retiring from the stage in 1887, Walter toured Europe as a recitalist of lieder, premiering numerous songs by Johannes Brahms and Antonín Dvořák. He became a pedagogue, teaching voice at the Vienna Conservatory for more than two decades. He is also the earliest born tenor to have left a legacy of gramophone recordings.

== Early life, education and career ==
As a young man, Walter studied violin at the Prague Conservatory. However, under pressure from his parents, he abandoned his musical pursuits and entered the Prague Polytechnic Institute to study engineering. After finishing his studies, he became the engineer for a sugar factory in his hometown of Bílina. He sang part-time in a male quartet in Prague while working as an engineer. His excellent natural voice was discovered by Franz Vogl who immediately offered to become his teacher. For many years, music historians believed he had studied with Johann Friedrich Samuel Johann but recent scholarship has confirmed that his studies were entirely with Vogl.

== Stage career ==
In 1855, in Brno, Walter made his operatic début as a lyric tenor in the role of Edgardo in Donizetti's Lucia di Lammermoor. The following year he moved to Austria due to the persuasion of soprano Rosa Czillag. He promptly joined the Vienna Staatsoper, singing there for the next thirty one years in primarily leading roles. His first role with the company was Gomez in Conradin Kreutzer's Das Nachtlager in Granada.

Walter became a highly popular Mozart singer and notably performed the role of Don Ottavio in Don Giovanni in 1869 for the opening of the new opera house in Vienna. He also found success in several Wagner roles. He sang Walther von Stolzing in the somewhat ill-fated Viennese premiere of Wagner's Die Meistersinger (1870), the title role in Lohengrin, and the role of Loge in both Das Rheingold and Die Walküre. In 1875, he originated the role of Assad in the world premiere of Karl Goldmark's Die Königin von Saba opposite Amalie Materna as the Queen of Sheba.

In 1882, he sang Alfonso in Vienna's first performance of Franz Schubert's Alfonso und Estrella. His other notable roles with the company included Manrico in Verdi's Il trovatore (1859), the Duke of Mantua in Verdi's Rigoletto (1860), Riccardo in Verdi's Un ballo in maschera (1866), and Vasco da Gama in Meyerbeer's L'Africaine (1866) among others.

Walter also periodically performed in opera houses in Germany and Bohemia. He sang with the Munich Court Opera in 1868, with Oper Frankfurt in numerous operas between 1864–1882, the Wiesbaden Opera House in 1874–75, the opera house in Brno in 1875, and the National Theatre in Prague in 1885. Some of the roles he sang in these houses include Raoul de Nangis in Meyerbeer's Les Huguenots, George Brown in Boïeldieu's La dame blanche, Tamino in Mozart's Die Zauberflöte, Florestan in Beethoven's Fidelio, and the title role in Gounod's Faust.

== Later career, recordings, teaching and death ==
Walter retired from the stage in 1887, with his last performance being as Wilhelm Meister in Ambroise Thomas's Mignon at the Vienna Staatsoper. He was appointed an honorary member of the Vienna Staatsoper upon his retirement. Walter also embarked on a famous series of lieder recitals throughout Europe, notably premiering several songs by Johannes Brahms and Antonín Dvořák. He had previously sung in the premiere of Brahms' Liebeslieder-Walzer and Dvořák dedicated his Cigánské melodie (Gypsy Songs, 1880) to him. His recital tour took him to London in 1872 and he appeared with the London Philharmonic in a concert of songs by Mozart, Hermann Riedel and Anton Rubinstein.

In 1891, Walter performed at the Salzburg Festival for the celebration of the 100th anniversary of Mozart's death. He gave numerous concerts in Munich and Dresden between 1881–1888. One of his last recitals was in Graz in 1897. Although he stopped giving solo recitals in the late 1890s, he continued to perform with others well into the next century and the beauty of his voice remained with him into the latter years of his life.

At the age of 71, in 1905, he made 5 recordings, including one of an aria from Mignon and one from Lohengrin. Although past his prime, "the voice is well preserved and the style both expressive and elegant". Music historians value these discs highly because in addition to their artistic merits, they preserve authentic 19th-century performance practices and singing styles.

In addition to performing, Walter spent much of his time teaching after his retirement from the operatic stage. He was a professor of voice at the Vienna Conservatory from 1882 until just a few years before he died in 1910, in Vienna. His students included Lula Mysz-Gmeiner and Olga von Türk-Rohn. His children, Raoul and Minna Walter, were also successful opera singers.
