= Johann Beck =

Johann Beck may refer to:

- Johann Georg Beck (1676–1722), German engraver
- Johann Tobias Beck (1804–1878), German theologian
- Johann Nepomuk Beck (1827–1904), Hungarian operatic baritone
- Johann Heinrich Beck (1856–1924), American composer and conductor
- Johann Beck (politician, born 1863) (1863–1923), Liechtenstein politician
- Johann Beck (politician, born 1885) (1885–1961), Liechtenstein politician
- Johann Beck (politician, born 1907) (1907–1992), Liechtenstein politician
- Johann Beck (politician, born 1913) (1913–1997), Liechtenstein politician
