= Joseph Beck (baritone) =

Austrian opera singer

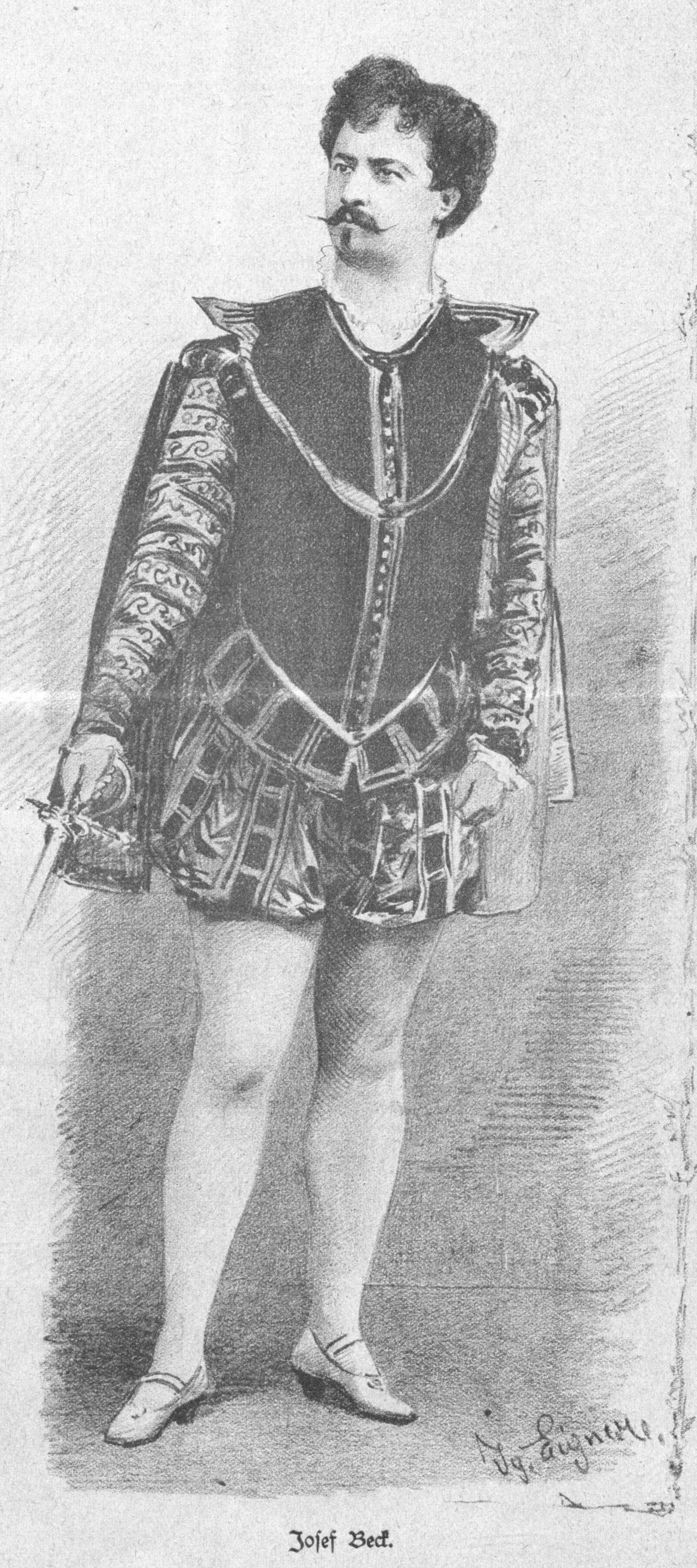
Josef Beck in 1885

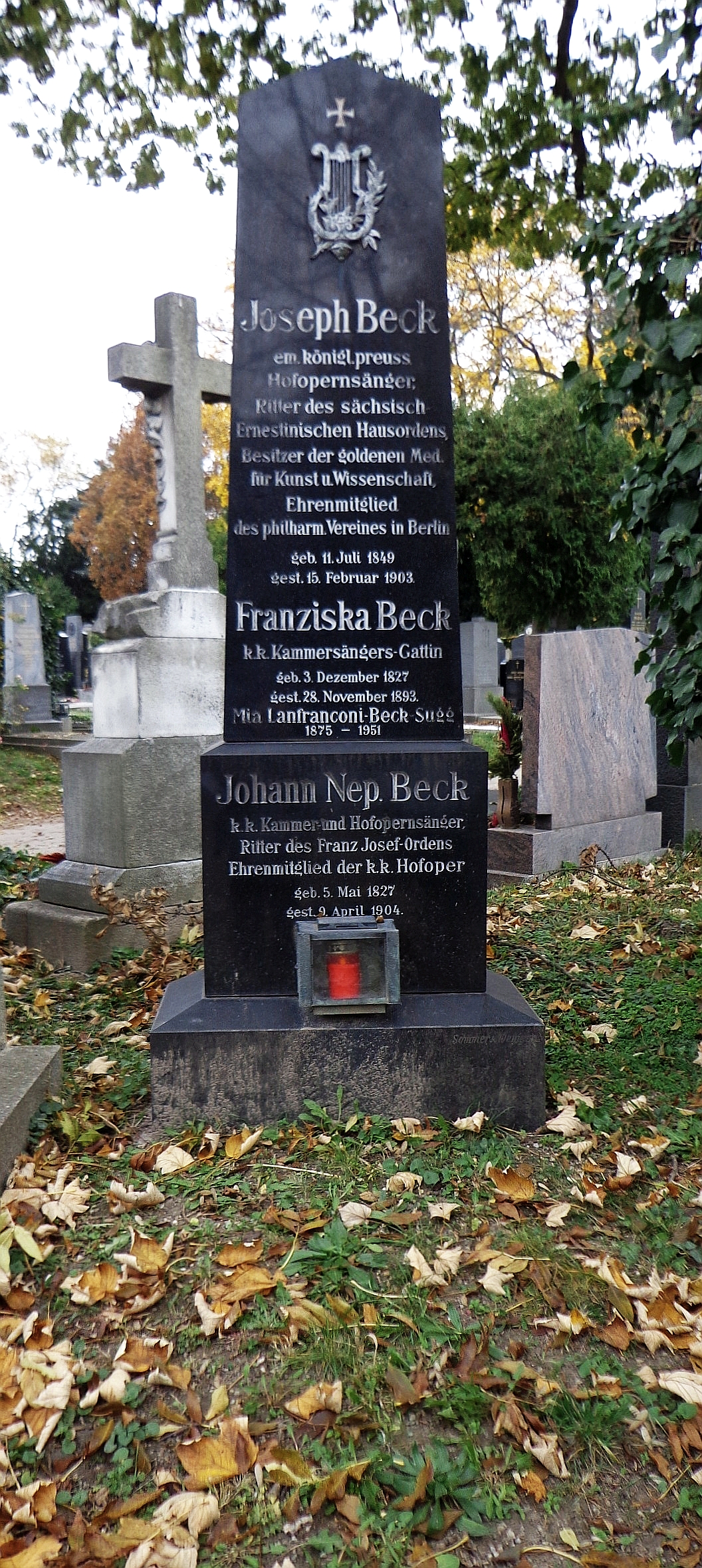
Vienna, Zentralfriedhof: The grave of Johann Nepomuk Beck and Joseph Beck

Joseph Beck (1848, Vienna – 1903, Pozsony, Hungarian Kingdom) was an Austrian operatic baritone of Hungarian descent, and the son of opera singer Johann Nepomuk Beck. Possessing a rich dramatic voice, he became a particularly lauded artist within the repertoire of Richard Wagner and Giuseppe Verdi. He notably portrayed the role of Richard the Lion Heart in the world premiere of Albert Dietrich's Robin Hood in 1879 and the role of Amaury de Montfort in the world premiere of Jules Deswert's Die Albigenser in 1880. He also sang the title role in Mozart's Don Giovanni for the opening of the Opern- und Schauspielhaus Frankfurt in 1880. Beck was a member of various opera companies during his career including the Vienna State Opera, the Hamburg State Opera, and the Metropolitan Opera among others. He gave up his career after 1895 to look after his ailing father, who outlived him by one year.

Beck sang a wide repertoire that encompassed German opera, Italian opera, and French opera. Among the many roles he portrayed are Pizarro in Beethoven's Fidelio, the title role in Peter Cornelius's Der Barbier von Bagdad, Petruchio in Hermann Goetz's Der Widerspänstigen Zähmung, King Solomon in Karl Goldmark’s Die Königin von Saba, Valentin in Charles Gounod's Faust, Katwald in Heinrich Hofmann's Armin, Lars in E. Kretschmar's Die Folkunger, Comte de Nevers in Giacomo Meyerbeer's Les Huguenots, Nélusko in Meyerbeer's L'Africaine, Hunold Singuf in Viktor Nessler's Der Rattenfänger von Hameln, the title role in Gioachino Rossini's William Tell, Friedrich of Telramund in Richard Wagner's Lohengrin, Hans Sachs and Veit Pogner in Wagner's Die Meistersinger, Alberich in Wagner's Das Rheingold, Wolfram in Wagner's Tannhäuser, Kurwenal in Wagner's Tristan und Isolde, the title role in Giuseppe Verdi's Rigoletto, Count di Luna in Verdi's Il trovatore, Renato in Verdi's Un ballo in maschera, and Amonasro in Verdi's Aida among others.

== Literature ==
- Ludwig Eisenberg: Großes biographisches Lexikon der Deutschen Bühne im XIX. Jahrhundert. Verlag von Paul List, Leipzig 1903, p 69 f., (Digitalisat). (German)
- Elisabeth Th. Hilscher-Fritz: Beck, Familie. In: Oesterreichisches Musiklexikon. Online-Edition, Wien 2002 ff., ISBN 3-7001-3077-5; Print: Band 1, edition of the Austrian Academy of Sciences, Vienna 2002, ISBN 3-7001-3043-0. (German)
