= Theodor Lay =

German opera singer

Theodor Lay was a nineteenth-century German operatic baritone who was particularly admired for his interpretations of the roles of Richard Wagner and Albert Lortzing. He is best remembered today for portraying the role of Baal-Hanan in the world premiere of Karl Goldmark's Die Königin von Saba in 1875.

== Biography ==
Lay began his performing career as a child appearing in stage plays at the young age of four. From 1857 to 1849, he sang in the opera chorus and acted in plays in Leipzig. He appeared in his first featured opera role in the world premiere of Albert Lortzing's Rolands Knappen oder Das ersehnte Glück in 1849. That same year he became the principal baritone soloist at the Hamburg State Opera. Over the next seven years he made several appearances in Olomouc and Brno in addition to his performances in Hamburg. In 1856 he returned to Leipzig to portray the role of Peter the Great in Lortzing's Zar und Zimmermann. That same year he joined the roster at the Vienna Hofoper (now Vienna State Opera) where he sang roles for the next thirty-five years. He notably portrayed the role of Sixtus Beckmesser in the Viennese premiere of Richard Wagner's Die Meistersinger von Nürnberg in 1870. Wagner attended the premiere and considered Lay's performance to be the finest interpretation of that role. Lay had several other successes with Wagner roles while in Vienna and he also portrayed the role of Baal-Hanan in the world premiere of Karl Goldmark's Die Königin von Saba in 1875. He retired from the stage in 1891.

== Sources ==
- Biography of Theodor Lay on Operissimo.com (in German). Accessed 2 February 2009.
