= Hermine von Siegstädt =

Austrian opera singer

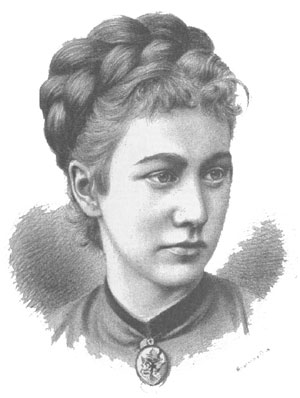
- Other name: Hermine Procháska
- Occupation: Opera singer

Hermine von Siegstädt (1844–1883) was an Austrian operatic soprano. She joined the company at the Vienna Hofoper (now Vienna State Opera) in 1864 where she sang regularly in mostly supporting roles for the next 19 years. She most notably portrayed the role of Astaroth in the world premiere of Karl Goldmark's Die Königin von Saba in 1875. After leaving the Vienna Hofoper in 1883, her activities and whereabouts are unknown.
