= Rustic Wedding Symphony =

Symphony by Karl Goldmark

Rustic Wedding Symphony, Op. 26 (Ländliche Hochzeit) is a symphony in E♭ major by Karl Goldmark, written in 1875, a year before his renowned Violin Concerto No. 1. The symphony was premiered in Vienna on 5 March 1876, conducted by Hans Richter. Johannes Brahms, who was a frequent walking companion of Goldmark's, and whose own Symphony No. 1 was not premiered until November 1876, told him "That is the best thing you have done; clear-cut and faultless, it sprang into being a finished thing, like Minerva from the head of Jupiter". Its first American performance was at a New York Philharmonic Society concert, conducted by Theodore Thomas on 13 January 1877.

== Structure ==
The work does not conform to the standard structure of a symphony, and it could just be named a Suite. It is in five movements rather than the usual four, which is same as Beethoven's Pastoral Symphony, Berlioz's Symphonie fantastique and Schumann's Rhenish Symphony. It is full of Central European charm, joviality and good humour. While Goldmark did not provide any specific program for the work, he did give each of the movements titles suggestive of aspects of a wedding in the countryside.

1. Hochzeitsmarsch. Variationen
2. Brautlied. Intermezzo
3. Serenade. Scherzo
4. Im Garten. Andante
5. Tanz. Finale

The first movement is a Wedding March (Hochzeitsmarsch) followed by a set of 13 variations. While variations are commonly found in symphonies, it is most unusual for them to appear in the first movement. The variations offer constant changes of tempo, meter, rhythm, mood and harmony, and display his fine craftsmanship.

- The theme of the March is reminiscent of Adeste Fideles, and is stated by cellos and basses in octaves.
- Variation 1 is played in horns, clarinets and flutes
- Variation 2, Poco animato, introduces the violins
- Variation 3, full orchestra
- Variation 4, Andante con moto, B♭ minor, the theme played by the violins
- Variation 5, Allegretto, basses, bassoons and horns
- Variation 6, Allegro vivace, horns, bassoons, flutes and violins
- Variation 7 involves part writing, again in a minor key
- Variation 8, Allegro scherzando, strings, flutes, oboes and clarinets
- Variation 9, minor key, basses, violins and flutes
- Variation 10, Molto vivace, violins with other strings pizzicato
- Variation 11, Andante con moto, violins, oboe and clarinet
- Variation 12, Moderato, a new melody based on the original theme, oboe, bassoon, viola and two violins
- Variation 13, after a brief fanfare, the original theme is played in the original tempo, but with the full orchestra, and then ends quietly.

The second movement is a Bridal Song (Brautlied).

The third movement, Serenade, opens with a theme played by two oboes, later developed by the strings. It includes an imitation of bagpipes, played on oboe, clarinet, bassoon and cellos.:

The fourth movement, In the Garden (Im Garten), is slow and lyrical, its middle section moving to E♭ minor.

The finale, Dance, is the only movement of the work written in sonata form. It opens with a fugue. The Garden theme briefly reappears, before the Dance returns to end the movement rousingly.

== Reception ==
The Rustic Wedding Symphony was a favourite of conductors such as Thomas Beecham and Leonard Bernstein. It has been recorded a number of times, by conductors such as Beecham, Bernstein, André Previn, Maurice Abravanel, Jesús López Cobos, Yondani Butt and Stephen Gunzenhauser.

== Sources ==
- Ethan Mordden: A Guide to Orchestral Music
- David Ewen: Music for the Millions – The Encyclopedia of Musical Masterpieces
- Raymond Monelle: The Musical Topic
