= Servilio =

Servilio is a given name. Notable people with the name include:

- Servílio de Jesús (1914-1984), Brazilian football midfielder
- Servílio Conti (1916-2014), Italian prelate
- José Lucas Servílio (1929–2001), Brazilian football defender
- Servilio Torres (born 1938), Cuban sports shooter
- Servílio (footballer, 1939-2005), full name Servílio de Jesus Filho, Brazilian football striker
- Servílio de Oliveira (born 1948), Brazilian boxer

== See also ==
- Servilia (disambiguation)
