= Onisim Bron =

Onisim Mikhailovich Bron (Russian: Брон Онисим Михайлович; 1895-1975) was a Soviet conductor active from the 1930s to 1950s. From 1948 he was artistic director of the opera ensemble of All-Union Radio, and from 1952-1956 of the VTO Soviet Opera Ensemble (Ансамбль советской оперы ВТО) founded by Ivan Kozlovsky. Apart from recordings of Puccini and Massenet operas in Russian his recordings include several rarer Russian operas for Melodiya which have never been re-recorded.

== Recordings ==
- Anton Rubinstein: The Merchant Kalashnikov (opera)
- Paliashvili: "Daisi" ("Twilight") Opera montage in three acts, libretto by V. Gunia (Performed in Russian), Choir and orchestra of the USSR radio. Conductor - Onisim Bron 1938
- Dargomyzhsky: "Esmeralda" - the earliest of Dargomyzhsky's four operas.
- Rimsky-Korsakov: 3 extracts from Servilia
