= Servilia =

Servilia may refer to:

== Ancient Roman women ==
Most from the gens Servilia, the most notable figures including:

- Servilia (wife of Catulus) (2nd century BC), wife of Quintus Lutatius Catulus
- Servilia (wife of Drusus) (2nd century BC), wife of Marcus Livius Drusus
- Servilia (wife of Claudius) (2nd century BC), wife of Appius Claudius Pulcher
- Servilia (mother of Brutus) (107–23 BC), mistress of Julius Caesar and mother of his assassin, Marcus Junius Brutus
- Servilia (wife of Lucullus), younger full-sister of the above, second wife of the conqueror Lucius Licinius Lucullus
- Servilia (niece of Cato), a niece of Cato the Younger who was left in his custody after the death of her parents
- Servilia (wife of Lepidus), wife of Lepidus the Younger

== Other uses ==
- Servilia (opera), 1901 work by Russian composer Nikolay Rimsky-Korsakov
- Servilia of the Junii, a fictionalized depiction of Servilia the mistress of Caesar in the Rome 2005-2007 TV series

== See also ==
- Marcia Servilia Sorana (40–66), the subject of Rimsky-Korsakov's opera
