= Marie Wilt =

Austrian opera singer (1833–1891)

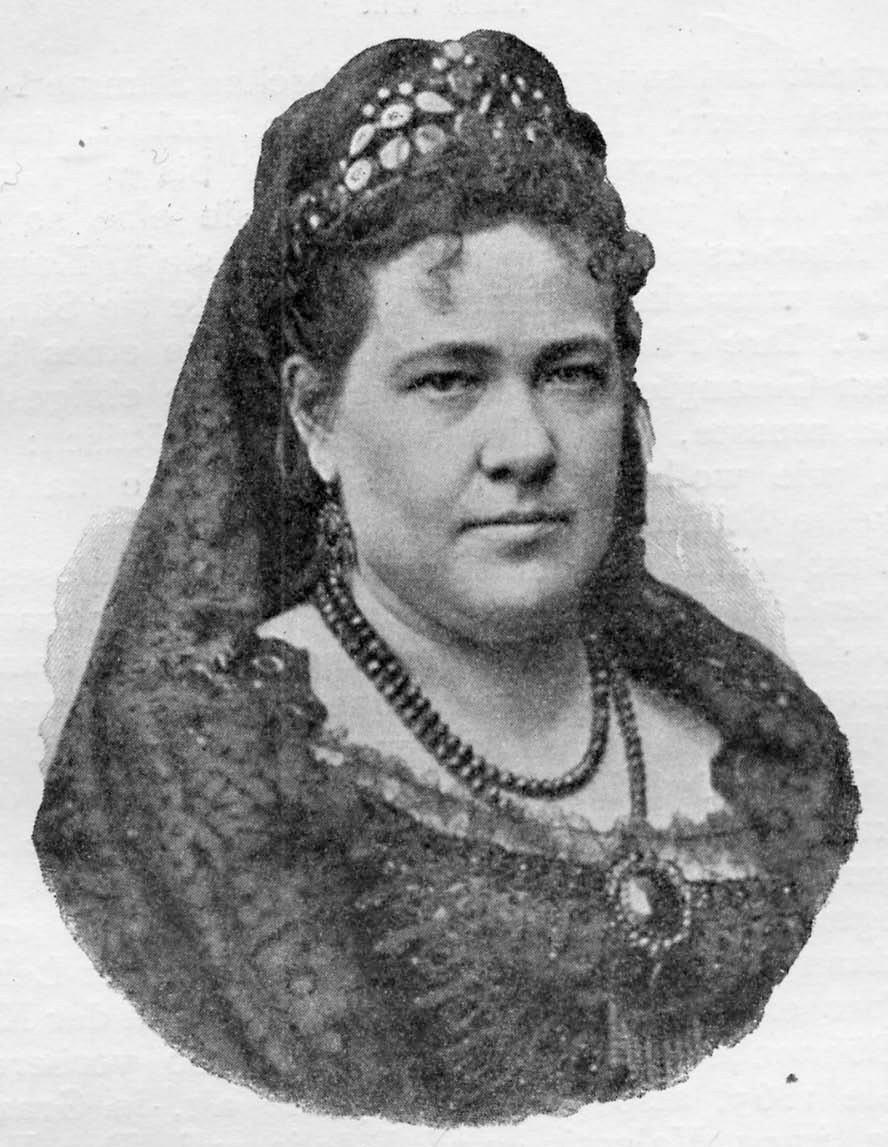
Marie Wilt c. 1895

Marie Wilt (also Maria Vilda and Marie Liebenthaler; 30 January 1833 – 24 September 1891) was an Austrian dramatic coloratura soprano. Possessing a wide vocal range with a significant amount of power and flexibility, Wilt sang a wide repertoire that encompassed the operas of Wolfgang Amadeus Mozart, the German operas of Richard Wagner, the grand operas of Giuseppe Verdi, and the bel canto operas of Bellini, Rossini, and Donizetti. She sang for many years at the Vienna Hofoper (now Vienna State Opera) and for a number of seasons at the Royal Opera House, Covent Garden in London. She notably portrayed the role of Sulamith in the world premiere of Karl Goldmark's Die Königin von Saba in 1875. Also a regular performer of the concert repertoire, Wilt often appeared in performances of works by Beethoven, Haydn, and Mendelssohn.

Wilt retired from the stage in 1890 and moved in with her daughter in Graz. Following a failed romantic relationship, she fell into a deep depression. She committed suicide by jumping from a hotel's window in Vienna.

== Biography ==
=== Early life and education ===
Born in Vienna, with the name Marie Liebenthaler, Wilt was orphaned as a young child and adopted by a family with the surname Tremier. Beginning in her teenage years, she sang in choirs in Vienna and occasionally appeared as a soloist. She married Franz Wilt, a banker, in 1855 and for the next several years worked as a housewife while still singing in choirs. She joined the Wiener Singakademie in 1858 and drew the attention of its director, Johann von Herbeck, who gave her solos in the oratorios and other large works the ensemble performed. Under Herbeck's persuasion and the influence of Belgian soprano Désirée Artôt she began to study singing with Joseph Gänsbacher.

=== Career and later life ===
Wilt made her professional opera début as Donna Anna in Mozart's Don Giovanni with Oper Graz in 1865. She repeated the role later that year at the Berlin State Opera, but had to leave the production in the middle of the opera's run due to carbon monoxide poisoning. The following year she went to England to join the roster at the Covent Garden where she sang roles for two seasons under the name Maria Vilda. She most notably sang the title role in Bellini's Norma while she was in London. She also appeared in Venice in November 1866.

In 1867 Wilt returned to Austria to join the roster at the Vienna Hofoper where she sang roles for the next decade. Her first role at the opera house was Leonora in Verdi's Il trovatore. She notably portrayed the role of Donna Elvira in Mozart's Don Giovanni for the opening of Vienna's new opera house in 1869. She also sang the title role in Verdi's Aida for the Austrian premiere of that opera in 1874 and portrayed the role of Sulamith in the world premiere of Karl Goldmark's Die Königin von Saba in 1875. Her other roles with the company included the Queen of the Night in Mozart's The Magic Flute, bel canto operas by Donizetti and Bellini, and several Wagner and Verdi heroines among others.

While singing with the Vienna Hofoper, Wilt also traveled periodically throughout Europe to appear as a guest artist in numerous operas and concerts. She was particularly admired for her performances of the soprano solos in Verdi's Requiem, Beethoven's 9th symphony, Beethoven's Missa solemnis, and the concert works of Haydn and Mendelssohn. She sang in concerts and operas in Frankfurt and Mannheim in 1868, Prague in 1869, and Riga in 1871. In 1873 she sang in concerts at the Lower Rhenish Music Festival in Düsseldorf and Aachen, and in Bonn for the celebration Robert Schumann. Wilt returned to Covent Garden in both 1874 and 1875 to appear in several productions with the company, including: Marguerite de Valois in Giacomo Meyerbeer's Les Huguenots, the title role in Donizetti's Lucrezia Borgia, Alice in Donizetti's Robert le diable, and the title role in Rossini's Semiramide.

Wilt left the Vienna Hofoper in 1877 and moved to Leipzig. While there she sang the role of Brünnhilde in one of the first complete performances of Richard Wagner's Der Ring des Nibelungen (The Ring Cycle) under conductor Anton Seidl. She joined the Opern- und Schauspielhaus Frankfurt in 1880 for their first season, opening their new opera house with the role of Donna Anna. She left Frankfurt in 1882 and spent the next four years singing in Budapest and Brno. She returned to the Vienna Hofoper in 1886 and the following year reprised the role of Donna Elvira at the Salzburg Festival for the centenary performance of Don Giovanni.

Wilt retired from the operatic stage in 1890 and, now a widow, moved to Graz to live with her daughter, Mrs. Gottinger. She fell in love with a younger man who ended up breaking her heart. The end of the romance threw her into a deep depression and she committed suicide by jumping from the window of the fourth floor of a hotel in Vienna.
