= Johann Nepomuk Beck =

Hungarian singer

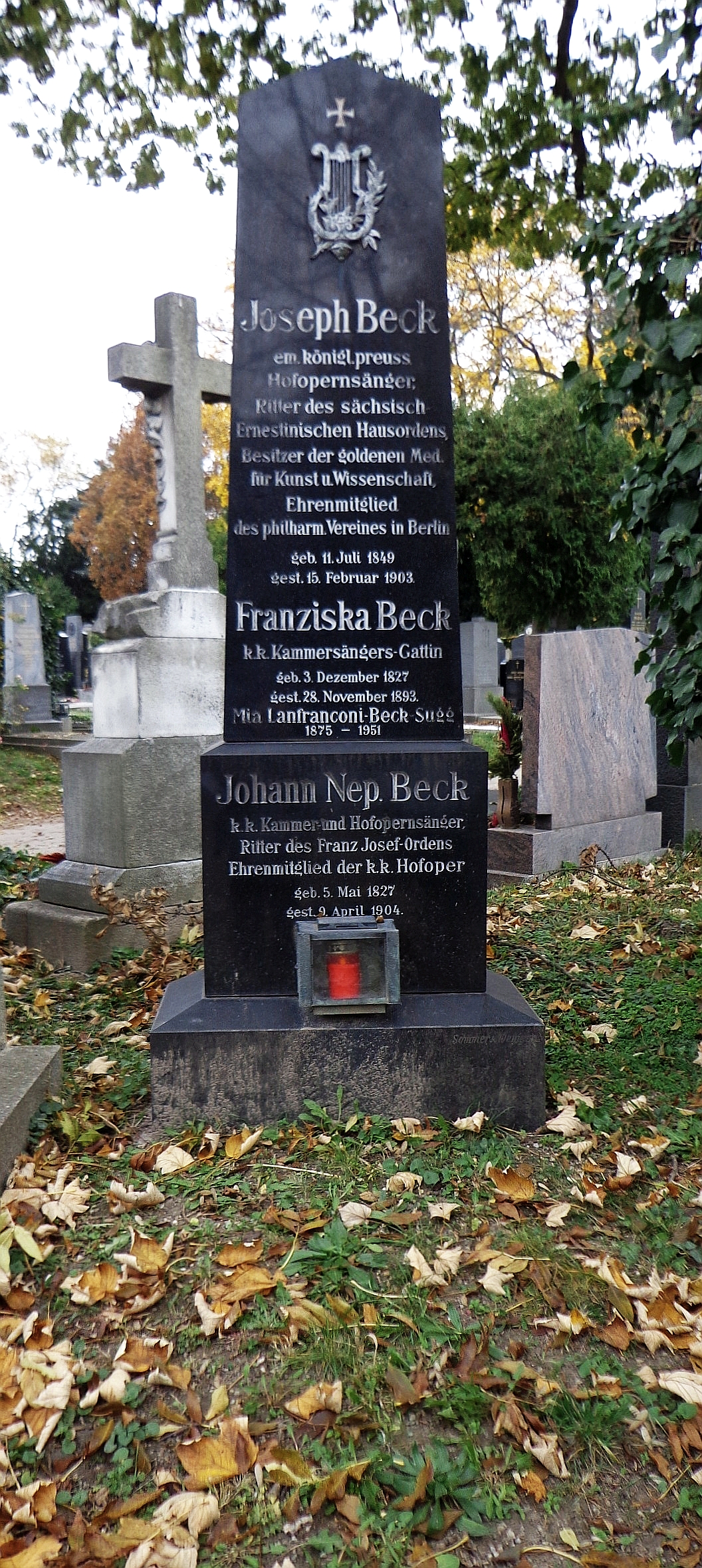
Vienna, Zentralfriedhof: The grave of Johann Nepomuk Beck and Joseph Beck

Johann Nepomuk Beck (5 May 1827 – 9 April 1904) was a Hungarian operatic baritone. He possessed a flexible and strong voice that was particularly suited to the French and Italian operatic repertoire. Beginning in 1853, he sang for more than thirty years at the Hofoper (now the Vienna State Opera), particularly excelling in works by Giacomo Meyerbeer, Wolfgang Amadeus Mozart, and Giuseppe Verdi. He notably portrayed the role of King Solomon in the world première of Karl Goldmark’s Die Königin von Saba in 1875.

== Biography ==
Born at Budapest, Beck first trained as a theology student there but was an active member of the choral society. During a touring season at Budapest from the Vienna Hofoper in about 1847, he sought advice over his 'splendid baritone' voice from the bass Karl Formes and tenor Josef Erl. Formes coached him in the role of Riccardo in I puritani and performed the opera with him in the same season. He then studied singing in Vienna and made his professional opera début as the Speaker in Mozart's Die Zauberflöte at the Hofoper in 1851. He spent the next two years in short commitments at the opera houses in Hamburg, Bremen, Cologne, Düsseldorf, Mainz, Würzburg and Wiesbaden. He also sang in several operas in Frankfurt including Friedrich of Telramund in Lohengrin (1852) and in the German premiere of Ambroise Thomas's Le songe d'une nuit d'été (1853).

In 1853, Beck was hired as a member of the company at the Hofoper where he sang roles for more than the next three decades. He notably performed the title role in Mozart's Don Giovanni for the opening of the new opera house in 1869. He also sang the role of Hans Sachs in Vienna's first performance of Wagner's Die Meistersinger in 1870 and the role of King Solomon in the world première of Karl Goldmark’s Die Königin von Saba in 1875. His other opera roles included Pizarro in Beethoven's Fidelio, Alfonso in Donizetti's Lucrezia Borgia, the title role in Donizetti's Belisario, Nélusko in Meyerbeer's L’Africaine, Tsar Peter in Meyerbeer's L'étoile du nord, Count Almaviva in Mozart's Le nozze di Figaro, the title role in Rossini's William Tell, King Froila in Franz Schubert's Alfonso und Estrella, Don Carlo in Verdi's Ernani, and the title role in Verdi's Rigoletto among others. His last opera performance was as Mikéli in Luigi Cherubini's Les deux journées in 1885.

In the late 1880s, Beck began to show signs of mental instability and was hospitalized in a mental institution in Inzersdorf. He was eventually released in the early 1890s into the care of his son, Joseph Beck, who gave up a successful opera career to look after his father. They lived together happily first in Vienna and then in Pressburg (modern Bratislava) until Joseph became ill and died in 1903. Johann died the following year.
