= Amalie Materna =

Austrian opera singer (1844–1918)

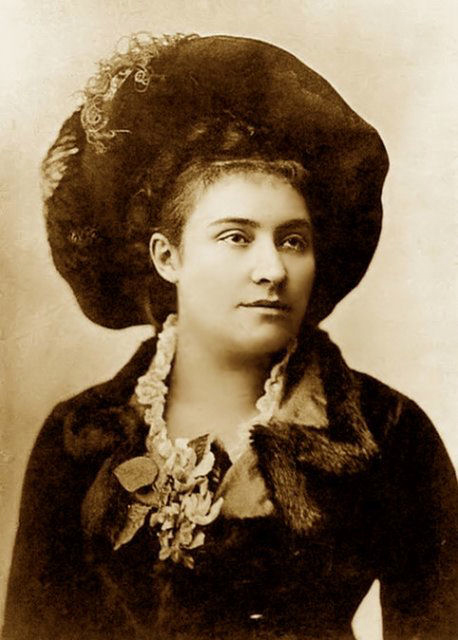
Amalie Materna, c. 1880

Amalie Materna (German pronunciation: [aˈmaːli̯ə maˈtɛʁna]) born Amalia, later Amalie Friedrich-Materna) (10 July 1844 St. Georgen in der Steiermark – 18 January 1918 Vienna) was an Austrian operatic dramatic soprano. While possessing a famously powerful voice, Materna also maintained a youthful, bright vocal timbre throughout her career which spanned three decades. She is best remembered today for originating several roles (such as Brünnhilde) in operas by Richard Wagner.

== Career ==
Materna made her professional opera début at the Thalia Theatre in Graz in 1865. She then married Karl Friedrich, an actor, and was engaged with him singing operettas in suburban theatres near Vienna, and at the Carltheater in Vienna. She made her debut at the Vienna State Opera in 1869, singing Selika in L'Africaine. Popularly received, Materna became a regular performer at the Vienna court for the next 25 years. Her notable performances include Amneris in the first Vienna performance of Aida in 1874 and the title role at the première of Goldmark's Die Königin von Saba (10 March 1875).

Materna was perhaps most admired for her interpretations of the works of Richard Wagner. She sang the role of Brünnhilde in the first complete Ring Cycle in Bayreuth (1876), appearing also in the first Vienna performances of Die Walküre (1877) and Siegfried (1878), and in the first Ring Cycle in Berlin at the Victoria Theatre (1881). In 1882 she originated the role of Kundry in Parsifal at Bayreuth, repeating the role there at every festival until 1891.

In 1884, Materna toured the United States with Hermann Winkelmann and Emil Scaria. She joined the Metropolitan Opera roster the following year making her début on 5 January 1885 as Elisabeth in Tannhäuser. Her other roles at the Met included Valentine in Les Huguenots, Rachel in La juive and Brünnhilde in Die Walküre. Writing in The New York Times, W. J. Henderson described her Brünnhilde as "a portrayal of world-wide celebrity and her impressive scenes with Siegmund and Wotan last night – scenes in which her deep feeling, expressive tones, and majestic appearance...told quite as strongly as the beauty and volume of her voice, were awaited with a confidence that was fully justified by the event."

She returned to Vienna later in 1885 and appeared in numerous productions there for the next nine years. Her final performance in Vienna was as Elisabeth on 31 December 1894. After her retirement she taught singing in Vienna, where she made one last public appearance in 1913, singing Kundry at a concert commemorating the centenary of Wagner's birth.

== Gallery of roles ==
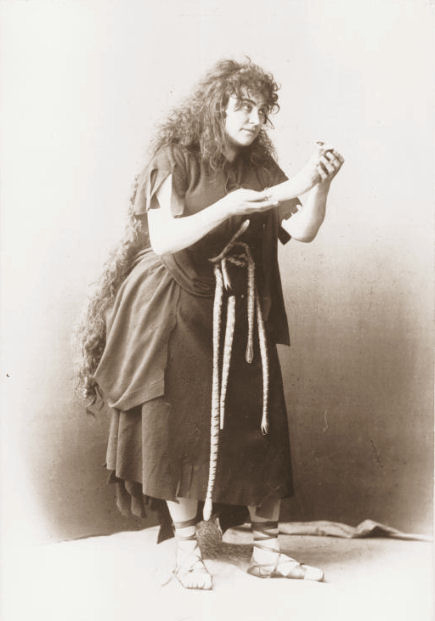
Kundry in Parsifal (Bayreuth, 1882)

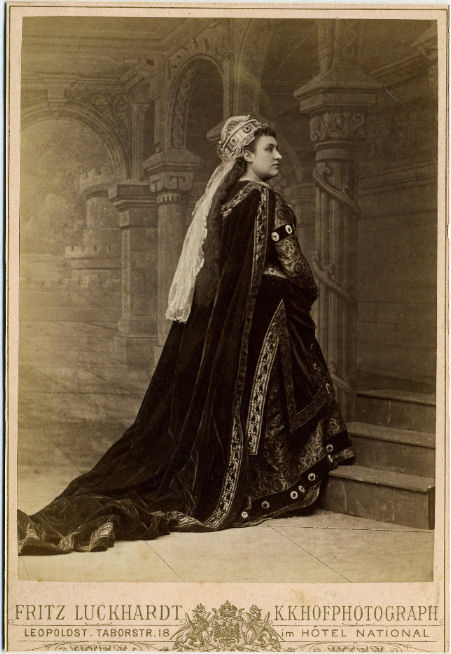
Ortrud in Lohengrin (Vienna)

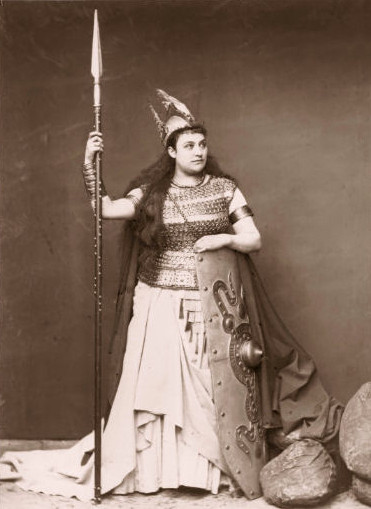
Brünnhilde in the Ring Cycle (Bayreuth, 1876)

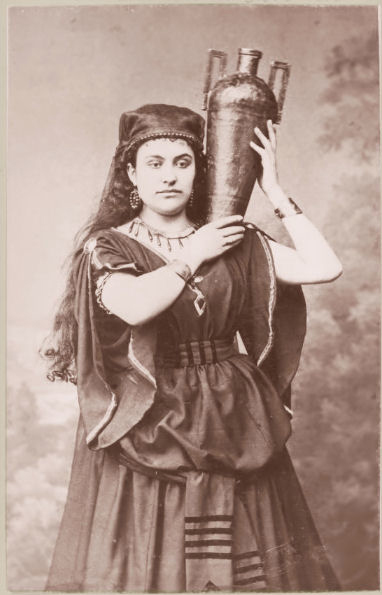
Rachel in La Juive

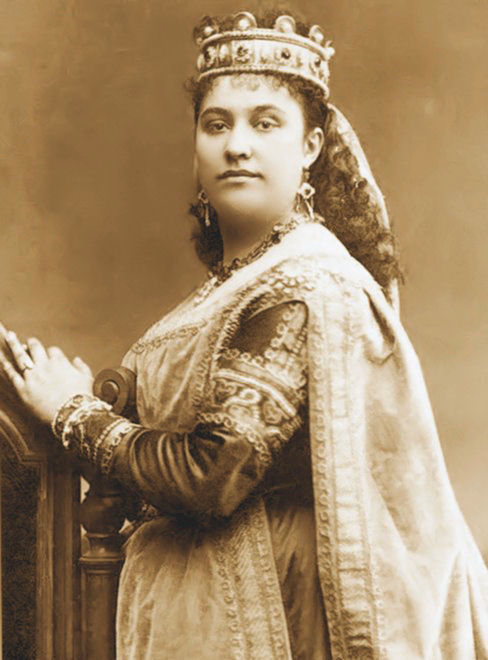
Elisabeth in Tannhäuser (Metropolitan Opera, 1885)

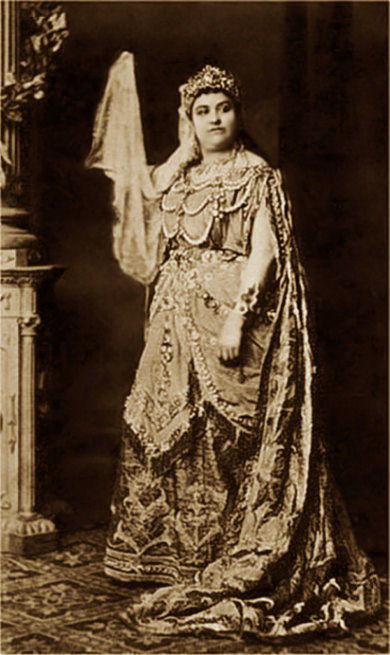
The Queen in The Queen of Sheba

== Sources ==
- Elizabeth Forbes: "Amalie Materna", Grove Music Online ed. L. Macy (Accessed October 20, 2008), (subscription access)
- Wilson, J. G.; Fiske, J., eds. (1900). "Materna, Amalie" . Appletons' Cyclopædia of American Biography. New York: D. Appleton.
- Bio at Great Singers of the Past
