= Piano Concerto No. 2 (Rubinstein) =

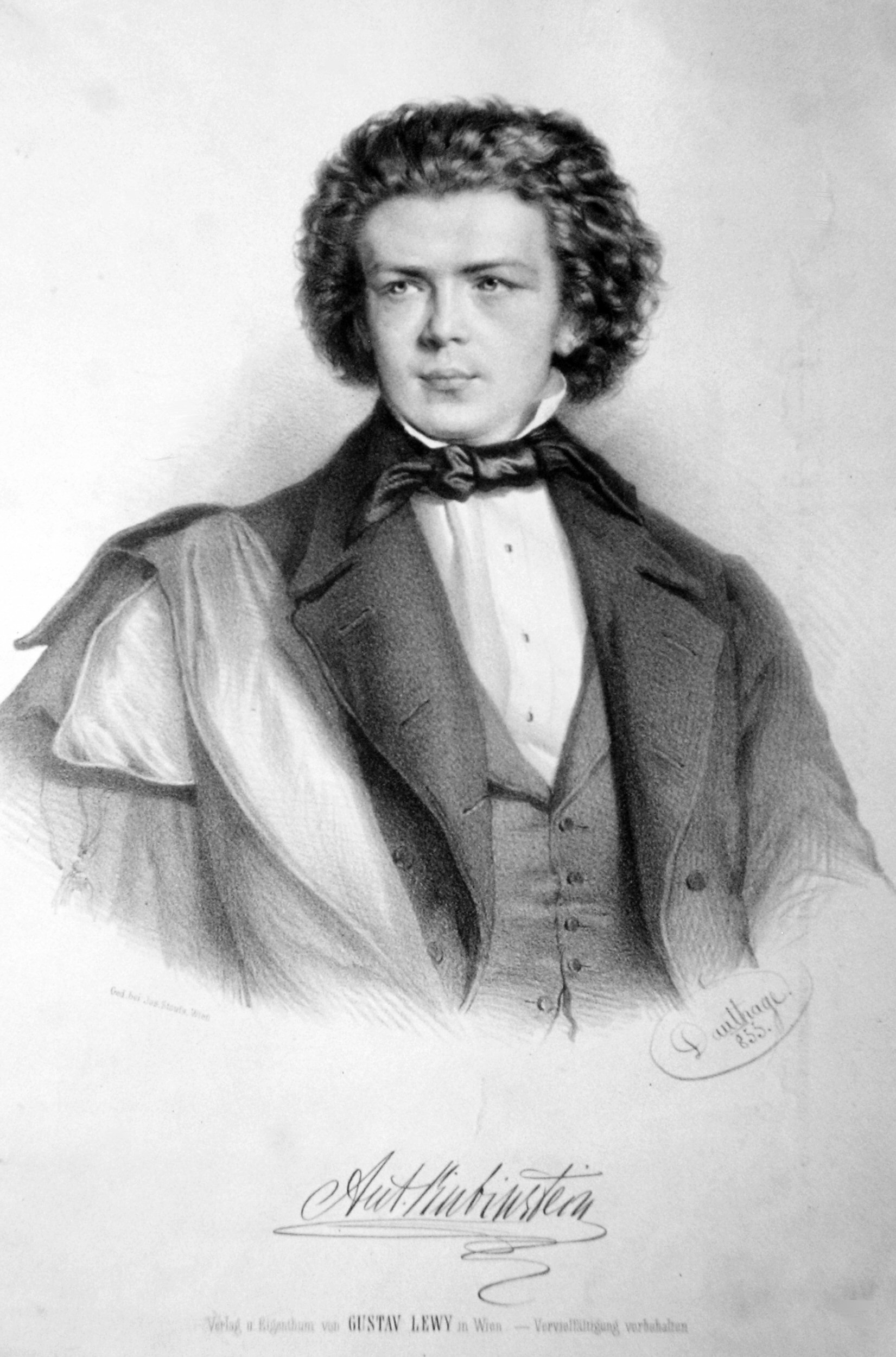
Lithograph of Anton Rubinstein, 1855

The Piano Concerto No. 2 in F major, Op. 35, was written by Anton Rubinstein in 1851, one year after his first concerto. Stylistically it is less clichéd than the first, yet it still displays the full virtuoso nature of the piano.

== Structure ==
The concerto is in three movements:

1. Allegro vivace assai
2. Adagio non troppo
3. Moderato
