= Ofatinți =

Ofatinți Офатинць (Moldovan Cyrillic) Выхватинцы (Russian) Вихватинці (Ukrainian)
- Commune
- Location within Moldova
- Coordinates: 47°40′1″N 28°59′54″E
- Country (de jure): Moldova
- Country (de facto): Transnistria (Note: Transnistria's political status is disputed. It considers itself to be an independent state, but this is not recognised by any UN member state. The Moldovan government and the international community consider Transnistria a part of Moldova's territory.)
- District: Rîbnița District
- Elevation: 136 m (446 ft)
- Time zone: UTC+2 (EET)
  - Summer (DST): UTC+3 (EEST)

Ofatinți (Moldovan Cyrillic: Офатинць; Ukrainian: Вихватинці, romanized: Vykhvatyntsi; Russian: Выхватинцы, romanized: Vykhvatintsy; Polish: Wychwatyńce), is a commune in the Rîbnița District of Transnistria, Moldova. It is composed of two villages, Novaia Jizni (Ukrainian: Нове Життя, Nove Zhyttia; Russian: Новая Жизнь, Novaya Zhyzn) and Ofatinți. It is located 15 km south of Rîbnița.

== History ==
Wychwatyńce, as it was known in Polish, was a private village of the Lubomirski family, administratively located in the Bracław County in the Bracław Voivodeship in the Lesser Poland Province of the Kingdom of Poland. It was a small trading port on the Dniester river. Following the Second Partition of Poland, it was annexed by Russia, within which it formed part of the Podolian Governorate. In the late 19th century, it had a population of 703.

In 1924, it became part of the Moldavian Autonomous Oblast, which was soon converted into the Moldavian Autonomous Soviet Socialist Republic, and the Moldavian Soviet Socialist Republic in 1940 during World War II. From 1941 to 1944, it was administered by Romania as part of the Transnistria Governorate.

According to the 2004 census, the population of the village was 1,218 inhabitants, of which 1,072 (88.01%) were Moldovans (Romanians), 64 (5.25%) Ukrainians and 60 (4.92%) Russians.

== Notable people ==
- Anton Rubinstein (1829–1894), virtuoso pianist and composer, born in Ofatinți.
