= The Merchant Kalashnikov =

Opera by Anton Rubinstein

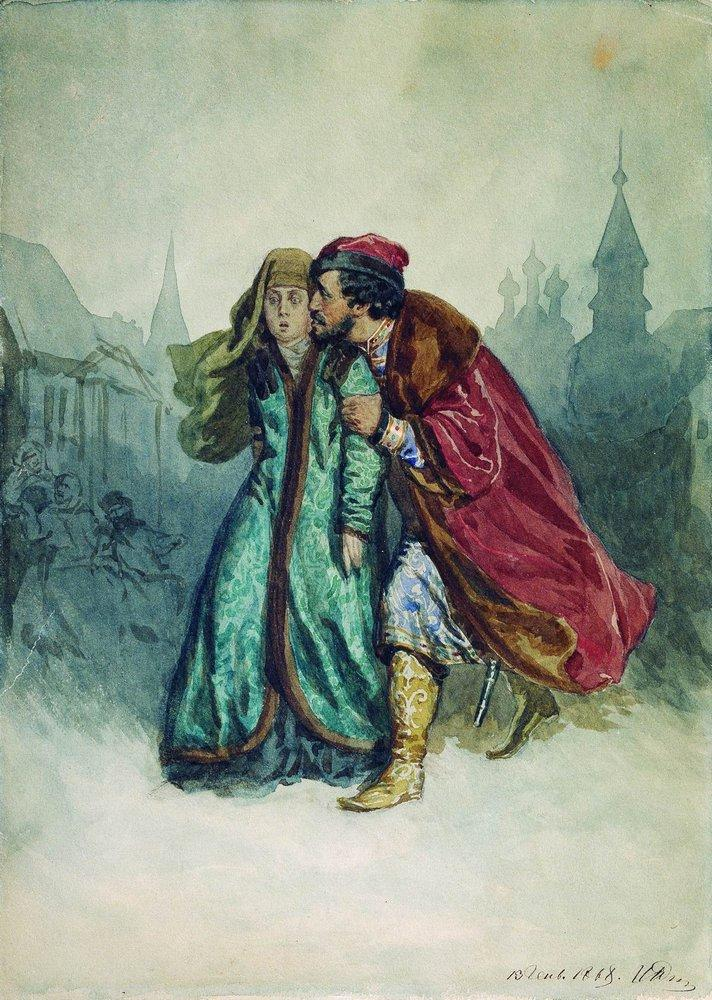
The Merchant Kalashnikov. Watercolour by Ilya Repin (1868)

The Merchant Kalashnikov (Russian: Купец Калашников, romanized: Kupets Kalashnikov) is a three-act opera by Anton Rubinstein, with a libretto by Nikolai Kulikov. It is based on the 1837 narrative poem The Song of the Merchant Kalashnikov by Mikhail Lermontov.

== Background ==
The opera was written between 1877 and 1879, and was first performed at the Mariinsky Theatre, Saint Petersburg on 5 March [O.S. 22 February] 1880. Written about the same time as the composer's Fifth Symphony, it has been seen as an attempt by Rubinstein to place himself as a Russian nationalist composer, like the members of The Mighty Handful. It has many elements in common with Russian nationalist operas which preceded it, notably Nikolai Rimsky-Korsakov's opera The Maid of Pskov and Tchaikovsky's opera The Oprichnik, both of which were also set in the times of Tsar Ivan the Terrible. It also contains typical features such as folk-songs, dances of jesters, chants of monks, and a chorus of praise for the Tsar. Like Rubinstein's earlier opera, The Demon, (1871), it was based on a narrative poem by Lermontov.

The Merchant Kalashnikov was not a success. It was taken off after its first two performances for political reasons (the climactic execution of Kalashnikov being objected to by Tsar Alexander II). It was revived in 1889, at first conducted by Eduard Nápravník; but at one performance under the composer's own baton, his conducting style was seriously ineffective: "the chorus and the orchestra strayed so far apart that the performance had to be stopped." In any case, the political situation meant that once again the performances had to be curtailed. Since then the opera has only been revived on Russian provincial stages, although in 1902 it was performed at the Private Opera in Moscow.

The opera has been criticised for the relatively low level of Rubinstein's musical and dramatic inspiration. The only significant female role, the merchant's wife Alyona, has no major part to play. Gerald Abraham writes:

A good deal [of the music] is mediocre [and] colourless ... the more definitely Russian melody sometimes tends to watery lyricism or else is weakened by conventional harmonization. ... But mixed in with this is much beautiful, colourful and expressive music.

Richard Taruskin, however, notes that the music closely follows the rhythms of the ancient Russian epics.

== Roles ==
Role	Voice type	Premiere cast, 5 March 1880 (Conductor: Karel Kucera)
Stepan Paramonovich Kalashnikov, a merchant	baritone	
Sergey Kiribeyevich, an oprichnik	tenor	Josef Paleček
Tsar Ivan IV	bass	Fyodor Stravinsky
Alyona Dmitriyevna, Kalashnikov's wife	soprano	Wilhelmina Raab
Chorus: citizens, oprichniki, boyars, heralds, neighbours, etc.

== Synopsis ==
Kiribeyevich, a member of the Tsar's guard (oprichnik) has made off with Alyona, the wife of Kalashnikov. Kalashnikov challenges him, and in a bare-fist fight kills him. Despite the pleas of Kalashnikov's wife, the Tsar condemns the merchant to death.

== Recordings ==
A recording was issued by Melodiya conducted by Onisim Bron.

== Notes ==
Sources

- Abraham, Gerald (December 1945). "Anton Rubinstein: Russian Composer". The Musical Times. 86 (1234): 361–365. doi:10.2307/934000. JSTOR 934000.
- Delano, Aline (1969) [1890]. "The Compositions of Anton Rubinstein". Autobiography of Anton Rubinstein, 1829–1889 (reprint ed.). Haskell House. p. 148.
- Taruskin, Richard. "Kupets Kalashnikov". Oxford Music Online. (subscription required)
- Waldon, Victor; Modell, D. A. (January 1919). "Reminiscences of Anton Rubinstein". The Musical Quarterly. 5 (1).
