= Marcia Servilia =

Daughter of Roman Senator Quintus Marcius Barea Soranus

Marcia Servilia or commonly known as Servilia (40s-66 CE) was the daughter of Roman Senator Barea Soranus. Her father was part of the Stoic Opposition who opposed Nero's tyrannical rule. When he was sentenced to death by Nero in 65 or 66, Servilia was similarly accused and sentenced to death on a charge of consulting sorcerers supposedly to find out her father's fate.

== Family ==
Servilia's father was Quintus Marcius Barea Soranus, a prominent Roman Senator and her mother may have been from the gens Servilia. Servilia's paternal uncle was the Roman Senator Quintus Marcius Barea Sura, who was a friend to the future Roman Emperor Vespasian. Her paternal cousins were Marcia (mother of Ulpia Marciana and of future Roman Emperor Trajan) and Marcia Furnilla (the second wife of the future Roman Emperor Titus). Her paternal grandfather Quintus Marcius Barea Soranus was Suffect Consul in 34 and twice Proconsul of Africa.

== Life ==
Servilia had a loving relationship with her father. She had married the Senator Gaius Annius Pollio, who was accused of treason in 37. In 65 he was exiled on Roman Emperor Nero's orders.

Tacitus describes Servilia as ‘young and imprudent’. The historian states that Servilia was inconsolable about her husband and was worried about her elderly father's fate. In 66, Servilia and her husband Annius Pollio were executed on Nero's orders on the charge of consulting sorcerers ostensibly to find out her father's fate.

== See also ==
- Servilia (opera), opera based on Servilia
- List of Roman women
- Women in ancient Rome

== Sources ==
- Tacitus, Annals, xvi. 30, 32
- Just. iv. In; Juvenal, Satire III. 116
- Cassius Dio lxii. 26.
- "Titus Flavius Vespasianus". Roman Emperors: An Online Encyclopedia of Roman Rulers and their Families.
- "Lepcis Magna: History". Livius. Archived from the original on 26 February 2015.
- "Lepcis Magna: Theatre (2) Inscriptions". Livius. Archived from the original on 3 March 2016.
- Franco Cavazzi. "Emperor Titus". The Roman Empire.
- Smith, William, ed. (1870). "Barea Soranus". Dictionary of Greek and Roman Biography and Mythology.
- Smith, William, ed. (1870). "Pollio, Annius". Dictionary of Greek and Roman Biography and Mythology.
- Smith, William, ed. (1870). "Servilia 4". Dictionary of Greek and Roman Biography and Mythology.
- https://web.archive.org/web/20091019223803/http://geocities.com/Athens/Parthenon/7094/titus1.html
