= Johann Beck (politician, born 1907) =

Liechtenstein politician (1907–1992)

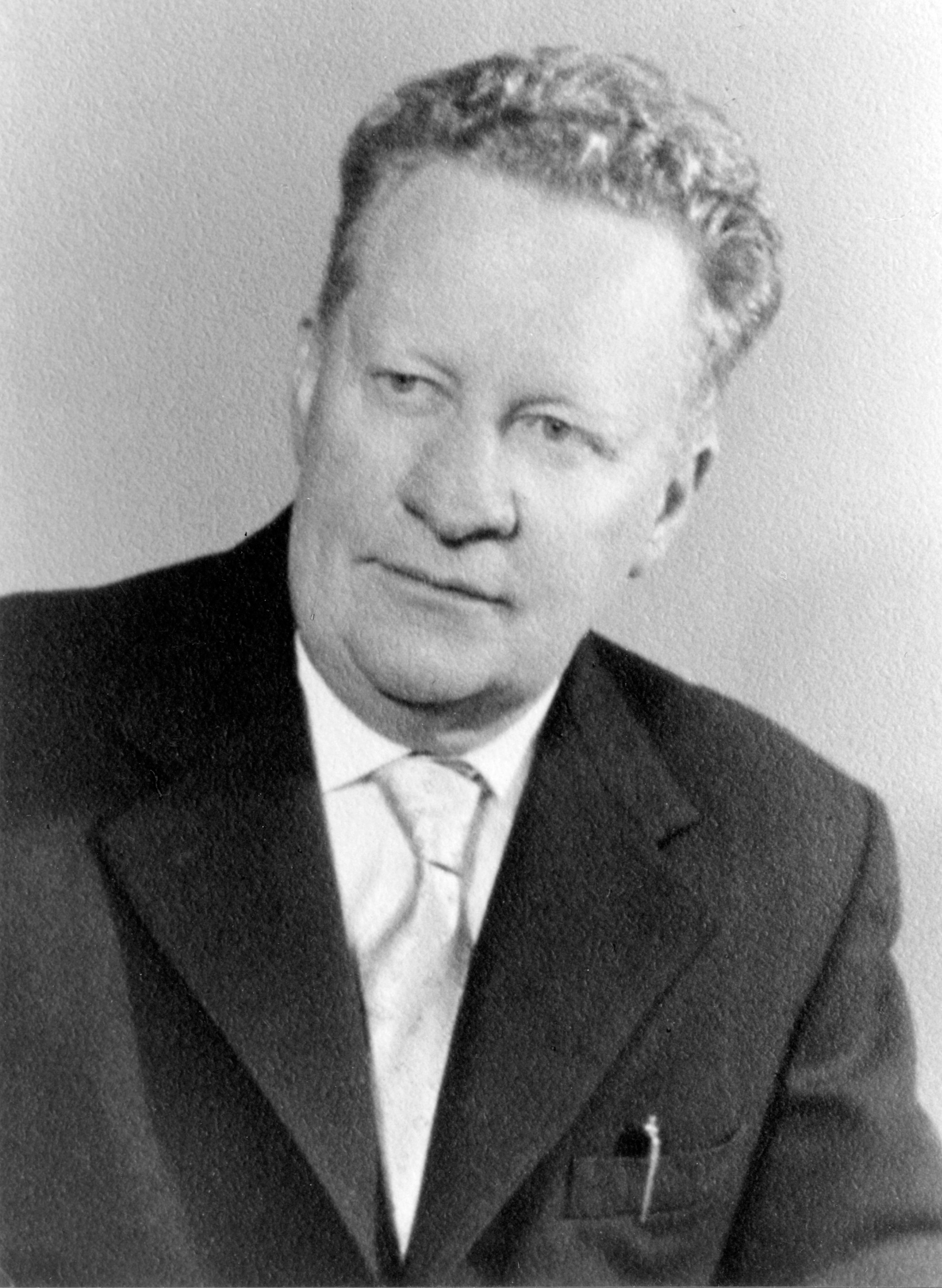
- Beck in 1940

Member of the Landtag of Liechtenstein for Oberland
- In office 4 April 1939 – 29 April 1945

Personal details
- Born: 24 April 1907 Triesenberg, Liechtenstein
- Died: 29 January 1992 (aged 84) Vaduz, Liechtenstein
- Party: Patriotic Union
- Spouse: Maria Schädler (m. 1940)
- Relations: Wendelin Beck (brother)
- Children: 3

Johann Beck (24 April 1907 – 29 January 1992) was a politician from Liechtenstein who served in the Landtag of Liechtenstein from 1939 to 1945.

== Life ==
Beck was born 24 April 1907 in Triesenberg as the son of a municipal councillor by the same name and Lucia (née Erne) as one of four children. He attended secondary school in Vaduz before working as a seasonal worker in Switzerland as a plasterer. He was the president of the Liechtenstein Workers' Association from 1938 to 1940 and then the head of the Liechtenstein employment office from 1940 to 1973. During this time, he was nicknamed the "Minister of Labour".

He was elected to the Landtag of Liechtenstein in 1939 as a member of the Patriotic Union (VU) as a part of the unified list between the party and the Progressive Citizens' Party (FBP) for the formation of a coalition government, where he served until 1945. During this time, he was a member of the Landtag's finance commission and state committee.

From 1948 to 1973, Beck was a member of the Triesenberg school board. In 1968, he co-founded the Triesenberg family aid and was its first president until 1976. He also wrote several historical articles on the Triesenberg area.

Beck married Maria Schädler (20 February 1908 – 5 October 1996) on 18 April 1940, and they had three children together. His brother Wendelin Beck also served in the Landtag. He died of a prolonged illness on 29 January 1992, aged 84.

== Bibliography ==
- Vogt, Paul (1987). 125 Jahre Landtag (in German). Vaduz: Landtag of the Principality of Liechtenstein.
