= Violin Concerto No. 1 (Goldmark) =

The Violin Concerto No. 1 in A minor, Op.28 by Karl Goldmark was composed in 1877 and premiered in Bremen the same year. Goldmark is supposed to have later composed a second violin concerto, but if so it was never published, and is believed to be lost.

== Structure and analysis ==
The concerto consists of three movements:

1. Allegro moderato
2. Air: Andante
3. Moderato – Allegretto

A standard all movements performance lasts approximately 32 minutes.

It has a Magyar march in the first movement and passages reminiscent of Dvořák and Mendelssohn in the second and third movements. It has started to re-enter the repertoire, through recordings by such prominent violin soloists as Itzhak Perlman and Joshua Bell. Nathan Milstein also championed the work and Milstein's recording of the Concerto (1957) is widely considered the definitive one. It has been used in several movies before.

== Recordings ==
Recordings of this concerto include:

Soloist	Orchestra	Conductor	Record Company	Year of Recording	Format
Nathan Milstein	New York Philharmonic	Bruno Walter		1942	Vinyl / CD
Nathan Milstein	Philharmonia Orchestra	Harry Blech	EMI Classics	1957	Vinyl / CD
Bronislav Gimpel	Southwest German Radio Symphony Orchestra	Rolf Reinhardt	Vox Records	1957	Vinyl / CD
Itzhak Perlman	Pittsburgh Symphony Orchestra	André Previn	EMI Classics	1978	Vinyl / CD
Ruggiero Ricci	Luxembourg Philharmonic Orchestra	Louis de Froment	Decca Records	1979	Vinyl / CD
Hu Nai-yuan	Seattle Symphony	Gerard Schwarz	Delos Productions	1995	CD
Vera Tsu	Razumovsky Sinfonia	Yu Long	Naxos Records	1995 (Note: Released by Marco Polo Records, along with a recording of the Korngold Violin Concerto in D minor by the same forces)/1997 (Note: Released by Naxos Records, contents are identical to the earlier release)	CD
Joshua Bell	Los Angeles Philharmonic	Esa-Pekka Salonen	Sony Classical Records	2000	CD
