= Anton Rubinstein =

Russian pianist, composer and conductor (1829–1894)

- Антон Рубинштейн
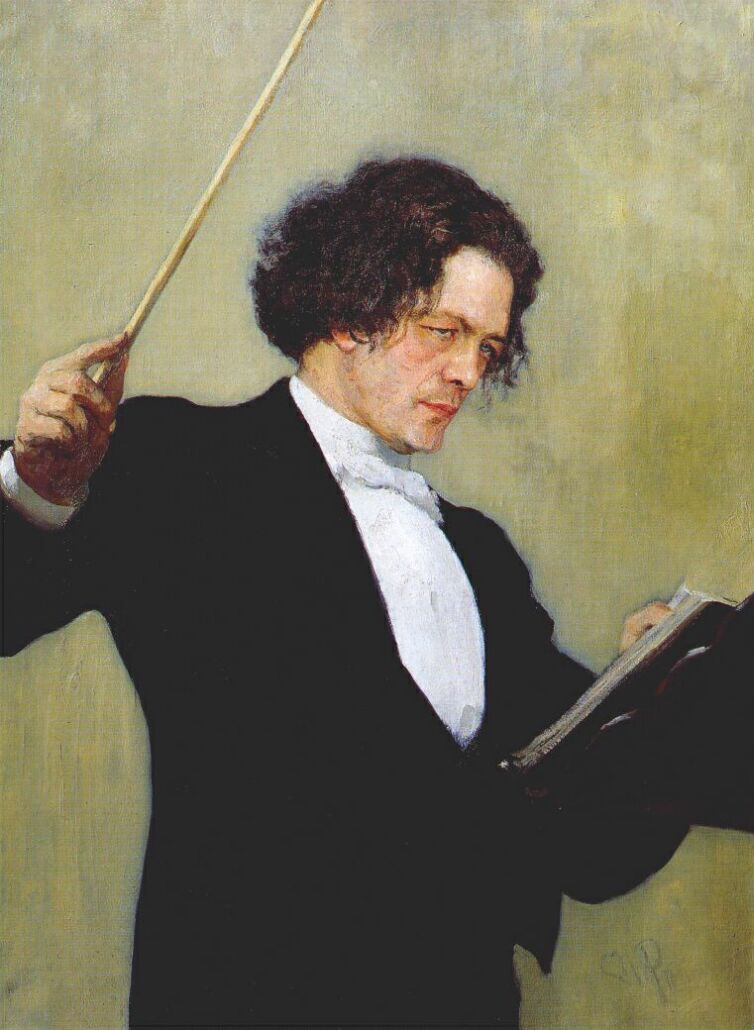
- Portrait by Ilya Repin (1887)
- Born: Anton Grigoryevich Rubinstein; 28 November [O.S. 16 November] 1829; Vikhvatinets, Podolia Governorate, Russian Empire
- Died: 20 November [O.S. 8 November] 1894 (aged 64); Petergof, Saint Petersburg, Russian Empire
- Occupations: Pianist; teacher; composer; conductor

Anton Grigoryevich Rubinstein (Russian: Антон Григорьевич Рубинштейн, romanized: Anton Grigoryevich Rubinshteyn; 28 November [O.S. 16 November] 1829 – 20 November [O.S. 8 November] 1894) was a Russian pianist, composer and conductor who founded the Saint Petersburg Conservatory. He was the elder brother of Nikolai Rubinstein, who founded the Moscow Conservatory.

As a pianist, Rubinstein ranks among the great 19th-century keyboard virtuosos. He became most famous for his series of historical recitals, seven enormous, consecutive concerts covering the history of piano music. Rubinstein played this series throughout Russia and Eastern Europe and in the United States when he toured there.

Although best remembered as a pianist and educator (most notably as the composition teacher of Tchaikovsky), Rubinstein was also a prolific composer; he wrote 20 operas, the best known of which is The Demon. He composed many other works, including five piano concertos, six symphonies and many solo piano works along with a substantial output of works for chamber ensemble.

In 1865 Rubinstein married Vera de Tschikouanov, a maid of honor at the Russian court, who bore him three children.

== Early life and education ==
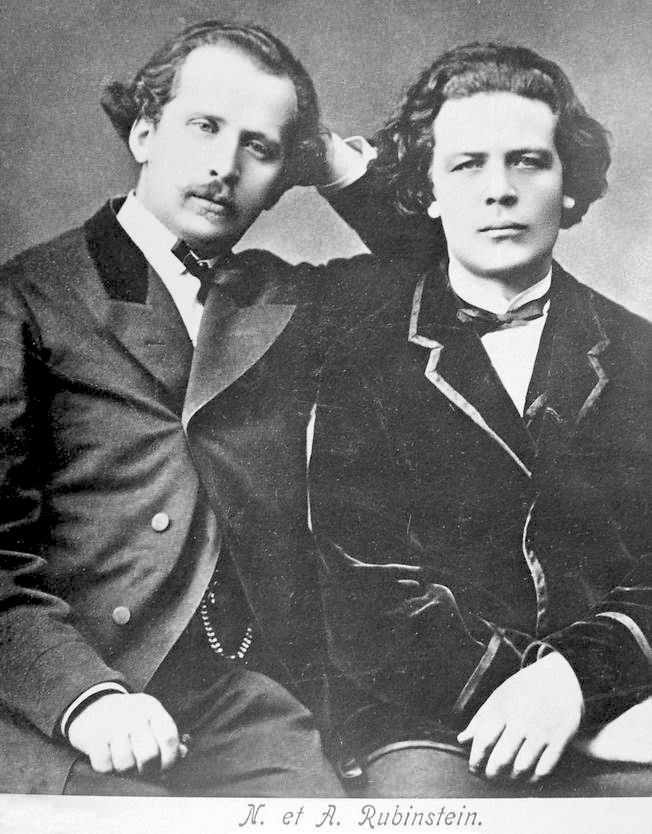
Brothers Rubinstein: Nikolai (left) and Anton, 1862

Rubinstein was born to Jewish parents in the village of Vikhvatinets in the Podolia Governorate, Russian Empire (now known as Ofatinți in Transnistria, Republic of Moldova), on the Dniestr River, about 150 kilometres (93 mi) northwest of Odessa. His sister Sofia was a chamber singer and teacher. Before he was 5 years old, his paternal grandfather ordered all members of the Rubinstein family to convert from Judaism to Russian Orthodoxy. Although he was raised as a Christian, Rubinstein would later become an atheist.

Russians call me German, Germans call me Russian, Jews call me a Christian, Christians a Jew. Pianists call me a composer, composers call me a pianist. The classicists think me a futurist, and the futurists call me a reactionary. My conclusion is that I am neither fish nor fowl—a pitiful individual.

— Anton Rubinstein, Gedankenkorb (1897)

Rubinstein's father opened a pencil factory in Moscow. His mother, a competent musician, began giving him piano lessons at five, until the teacher Alexander Villoing heard and accepted Rubinstein as a non-paying student. Rubinstein made his first public appearance at a charity benefit concert at the age of nine. Later that year Rubinstein's mother sent him, accompanied by Villoing, to Paris where he sought unsuccessfully to enroll at the Paris Conservatoire.

Rubinstein and Villoing remained in Paris for a year. In December 1840, Rubinstein played in the Salle Érard for an audience that included Frédéric Chopin and Franz Liszt. Chopin invited Rubinstein to his studio and played for him. Liszt advised Villoing to take him to Germany to study composition; however, Villoing took Rubinstein on an extended concert tour of Europe and Western Russia. They finally returned to Moscow in June 1843. Determined to raise money to further the musical careers of both Anton and his younger brother Nikolai, their mother sent Rubinstein and Villoing on a tour of Russia, following which the brothers were dispatched to Saint Petersburg to play for Tsar Nicholas I and the Imperial family at the Winter Palace. Anton was 14 years old; Nikolai was eight.

== Travel and performance ==
=== Berlin ===
In spring 1844, Rubinstein, Nikolai, his mother and his sister Luba travelled to Berlin. Here he met with, and was supported by, Felix Mendelssohn and Giacomo Meyerbeer. Mendelssohn, who had heard Rubinstein when he had toured with Villoing, said he needed no further piano study but sent Nikolai to Theodor Kullak for instruction. Meyerbeer directed both boys to Siegfried Dehn for work in composition and theory.

Word came in the summer of 1846 that Rubinstein's father was gravely ill. Rubinstein was left in Berlin while his mother, sister and brother returned to Russia. At first he continued his studies with Dehn, then with Adolf Bernhard Marx, while composing in earnest. Now 17, he knew he could no longer pass as a child prodigy. He sought out Liszt in Vienna, hoping Liszt would accept him as a pupil. However, after Rubinstein had played his audition, Liszt is reported to have said, "A talented man must win the goal of his ambition by his own unassisted efforts." At this point, Rubinstein was living in acute poverty. Liszt did nothing to help him. Other calls Rubinstein made to potential patrons came to no avail. After an unsuccessful year in Vienna and a concert tour of Hungary, he returned to Berlin and continued giving lessons.

=== Back to Russia ===
The Revolution of 1848 forced Rubinstein back to Russia. Spending the next five years mainly in Saint Petersburg, Rubinstein taught, gave concerts and performed frequently at the Imperial court. The Grand Duchess Elena Pavlovna, sister-in-law to Tsar Nicholas I, became his most devoted patroness. By 1852, he had become a leading figure in Saint Petersburg's musical life, performing as a soloist and collaborating with some of the outstanding instrumentalists and vocalists who came to the Russian capital.

He also composed assiduously. After a number of delays, including some difficulties with the censor, Rubinstein's first opera, Dmitry Donskoy (now lost except for the overture), was performed at the Bolshoy Theater in Saint Petersburg in 1852. Three one-act operas written for Elena Pavlovna followed. He also played and conducted several of his works, including the Ocean Symphony in its original four-movement form, his Second Piano Concerto and several solo works. It was partly his lack of success on the Russian opera stage that led Rubinstein to consider going abroad once more to secure his reputation as a serious artist.

=== Abroad once more ===
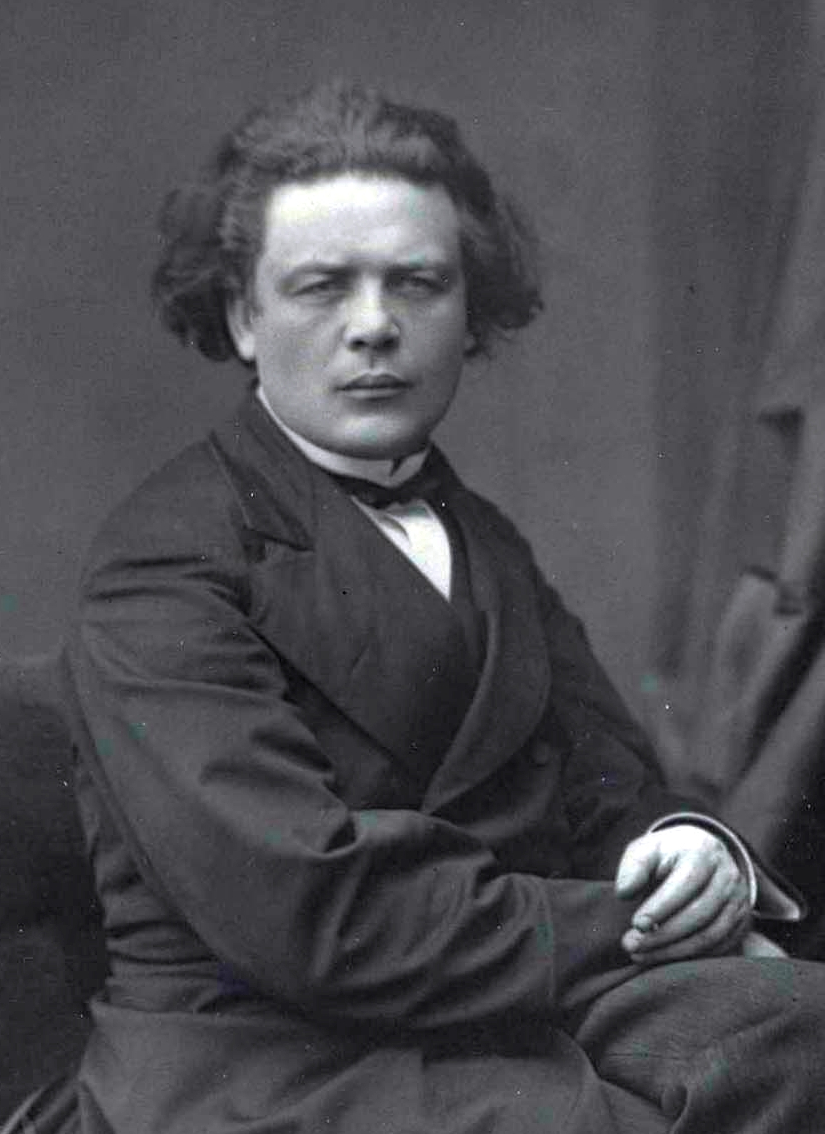
"Van II": Liszt considered Rubinstein to have a physical likeness to Ludwig van Beethoven.

In 1854, Rubinstein began a four-year concert tour of Europe. This was his first major concert tour in a decade. Now 24, he felt ready to offer himself to the public as a fully developed pianist as well as a composer of worth. He very shortly reestablished his reputation as a virtuoso. Ignaz Moscheles wrote in 1855 what would become a widespread opinion about Rubinstein: "In power and execution he is inferior to no one."

As was the penchant at the time, much of what Rubinstein played were his own compositions. At several concerts, Rubinstein alternated between conducting his orchestral works and playing as soloist in one of his piano concertos. One high point for him was leading the Leipzig Gewandhaus orchestra in his Ocean Symphony on 16 November 1854. Although reviews were mixed about Rubinstein's merits as a composer, they were more favorable about him as a performer when he played a solo recital a few weeks later.

Rubinstein spent one tour break, in the winter of 1856–57, with Elena Pavlovna and much of the Imperial royal family in Nice. Rubinstein participated in discussions with Elena Pavlova on plans to raise the level of musical education in their homeland; these bore initial fruit with the founding of the Russian Musical Society (RMS) in 1859.

=== Opening the St. Petersburg Conservatory ===
The opening of the Saint Petersburg Conservatory, the first music school in Russia and a development from the RMS per its charter, followed in 1862.

Some in Russian society were surprised that a Russian music school would actually attempt to be Russian. One "fashionable lady", when told by Rubinstein that classes would be taught in Russian and not a foreign language, exclaimed, "What, music in Russian! That is an original idea!" Rubinstein adds,

And surely it was surprising that the theory of Music was to be taught for the first time in the Russian language at our Conservatory... Hitherto, if any one wished to study it, he was obliged to take lessons from a foreigner, or to go to Germany.

There were also those who feared the school would not be Russian enough. Rubinstein drew a tremendous amount of criticism from the Russian nationalist music group known as The Five. Mikhail Tsetlin (aka Mikhail Zetlin), in his book on The Five, writes,

The very idea of a conservatory implied, it is true, a spirit of academism which could easily turn it into a stronghold of routine, but then the same could be said of conservatories all over the world. Actually the Conservatory did raise the level of musical culture in Russia. The unconventional way chosen by Balakirev and his friends was not necessarily the right one for everybody else.

It was during this period that Rubinstein drew his greatest success as a composer, beginning with his Fourth Piano Concerto in 1864 and culminating with his opera The Demon in 1871. Between these two works are the orchestral works Don Quixote, which Tchaikovsky found "interesting and well done," though "episodic," and the opera Ivan IV Grozniy, which was premiered by Balakirev. Borodin commented on Ivan IV that "the music is good, you just cannot recognize that it is Rubinstein. There is nothing that is Mendelssohnian, nothing as he used to write formerly."

=== American tour ===
By 1867, ongoing tensions with the Balakirev camp, along with related matters, led to intense dissension within the Conservatory's faculty. Rubinstein resigned and returned to touring throughout Europe. Unlike his previous tours, he began increasingly featuring the works of other composers. In previous tours, Rubinstein had played primarily his own works.

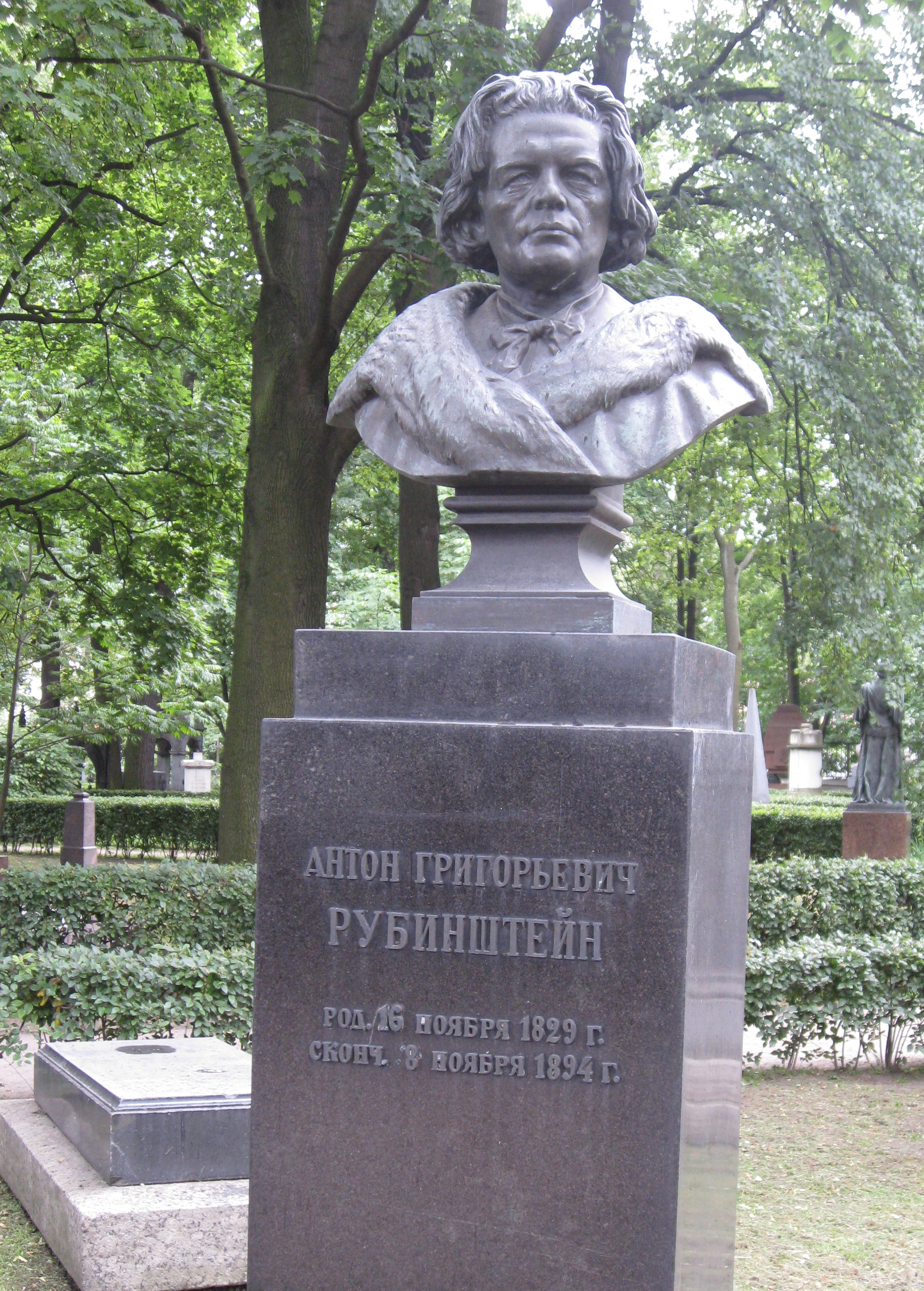
Rubinstein headstone in Tikhvin Cemetery, Saint Petersburg

At the behest of the Steinway & Sons piano company, Rubinstein toured the United States during the 1872–73 season. Steinway's contract with Rubinstein called on him to give 200 concerts at the then unheard-of rate of 200 dollars per concert (payable in gold—Rubinstein distrusted both United States banks and United States paper money), plus all expenses paid. Rubinstein stayed in America 239 days, giving 215 concerts—sometimes two and three a day in as many cities.

Rubinstein wrote of his American experience,

May Heaven preserve us from such slavery! Under these conditions there is no chance for art—one simply grows into an automaton, performing mechanical work; no dignity remains to the artist; he is lost... The receipts and the success were invariably gratifying, but it was all so tedious that I began to despise myself and my art. So profound was my dissatisfaction that when several years later I was asked to repeat my American tour, I refused pointblank...

Despite his misery, Rubinstein made enough money from his American tour to give him financial security for the rest of his life. Upon his return to Russia, he "hastened to invest in real estate", purchasing a dacha in Peterhof, not far from Saint Petersburg, for himself and his family.

=== Later life ===
Rubinstein continued to make tours as a pianist and give appearances as a conductor. In 1887, he returned to the Saint Petersburg Conservatory with the goal of improving overall standards. He removed inferior students, fired and demoted many professors, made entrance and examination requirements more stringent, and revised the curriculum. He led semi-weekly teachers' classes through the whole keyboard literature and gave some of the more gifted piano students personal coaching. During the 1889–90 academic year he gave weekly lecture-recitals for the students. He resigned again and left Russia in 1891 over Imperial demands that Conservatory admittance, and later annual prizes to students, be awarded along ethnic quotas instead of purely by merit. These quotas were designed to effectively disadvantage Jews. Rubinstein resettled in Dresden and started giving concerts again in Germany and Austria. Nearly all of these concerts were charity benefit events.

Rubinstein also coached a few pianists and taught his only private piano student, Josef Hofmann, who would become one of the finest keyboard artists of the 20th century.

Rubinstein never forgot his origins: he held a series of concerts, the proceeds of which he donated to the fund of his native village of Vikhvatinets (Ofatinți), with the help of which a public school was subsequently opened.

Despite his sentiments on ethnic politics in Russia, Rubinstein returned there occasionally to visit friends and family. He gave his final concert in Saint Petersburg on 14 January 1894. With his health failing rapidly, Rubinstein moved back to Peterhof in the summer of 1894. He died there on 20 November of that year, having suffered from heart disease for some time.

== Pianism ==
=== "Van II" ===
Many contemporaries felt he bore a striking resemblance to Ludwig van Beethoven. Ignaz Moscheles, who had known Beethoven intimately, wrote, "Rubinstein's features and short, irrepressible hair remind me of Beethoven." Liszt referred to Rubinstein as "Van II." This resemblance was also felt to be in Rubinstein's keyboard playing. Under his hands, it was said, the piano erupted volcanically. Audience members wrote of going home limp after one of his recitals, knowing they had witnessed a force of nature.

Sometimes Rubinstein's playing was too much for listeners to handle. American pianist Amy Fay, who wrote extensively on the European classical music scene, admitted that while Rubinstein "has a gigantic spirit in him, and is extremely poetic and original ... for an entire evening he is too much. Give me Rubinstein for a few pieces, but Tausig for a whole evening." She heard Rubinstein play "a terrific piece by Schubert," reportedly the Wanderer Fantasie. The performance gave her such a violent headache that the rest of the recital was ruined for her.

Clara Schumann proved especially vehement. After she heard him play the Mendelssohn C minor Trio in 1857, she wrote that "he so rattled it off that I did not know how to control myself ... and often he so annihilated fiddle and cello that I ... could hear nothing of them." Nor had things improved in Clara's view a few years later, when Rubinstein gave a concert in Breslau. She noted in her diary, "I was furious, for he no longer plays. Either there is a perfectly wild noise or else a whisper with the soft pedal down. And a would-be cultured audience puts up with a performance like that!"

On the other hand, when Rubinstein played Beethoven's "Archduke" Trio with violinist Leopold Auer and cellist Alfredo Piatti in 1868, Auer recalls:

It was the first time I had heard this great artist play. He was most amiable at the rehearsal... To this day I can recall how Rubinstein sat down at the piano, his leonine head thrown back slightly, and began the five opening measures of the principal theme... It seemed to me I had never before heard the piano really played. The grandeur of style with which Rubinstein presented those five measures, the beauty of tone his softness of touch secured, the art with which he manipulated the pedal, are indescribable ...

Violinist and composer Henri Vieuxtemps adds:

His power over the piano is something undreamt of; he transports you into another world; all that is mechanical in the instrument is forgotten. I am still under the influence of the all-embracing harmony, the scintillating passages and thunder of Beethoven's Sonata Op. 57 [Appassionata], which Rubinstein executed for us with unimagined mastery.

Viennese music critic Eduard Hanslick expressed what Schonberg calls "the majority point of view" in an 1884 review. After complaining of the over-three-hour length of Rubinstein's recital, Hanslick admits that the sensual element of the pianist's playing gives pleasure to listeners. Both Rubinstein's virtues and flaws, Hanslick commented, spring from an untapped natural strength and elemental freshness. "Yes, he plays like a god", Hanslick writes in closing, "and we do not take it amiss if, from time to time, he changes, like Jupiter, into a bull".

Sergei Rachmaninoff's fellow piano student Matvey Pressman adds,

He enthralled you by his power, and he captivated you by the elegance and grace of his playing, by his tempestuous, fiery temperament and by his warmth and charm. His crescendo had no limits to the growth of the power of its sonority; his diminuendo reached an unbelievable pianissimo, sounding in the most distant corners of a huge hall. In playing, Rubinstein created, and he created inimitably and with genius. He often treated the same program absolutely differently when he played it the second time, but, more astoundingly still, everything came out wonderfully on both occasions.

Rubinstein was also adept at improvisation—a practice at which Beethoven had excelled. Composer Karl Goldmark wrote of one recital where Rubinstein improvised on a motive from the last movement of Beethoven's Eighth Symphony:

He counterpointed it in the bass; then developed it first as a canon, next as a four-voiced fugue, and again transformed it into a tender song. He then returned to Beethoven's original form, later changing it to a gay Viennese waltz, with its own peculiar harmonies, and finally dashed into cascades of brilliant passages, a perfect storm of sound in which the original theme was still unmistakable. It was superb."

=== Technique ===
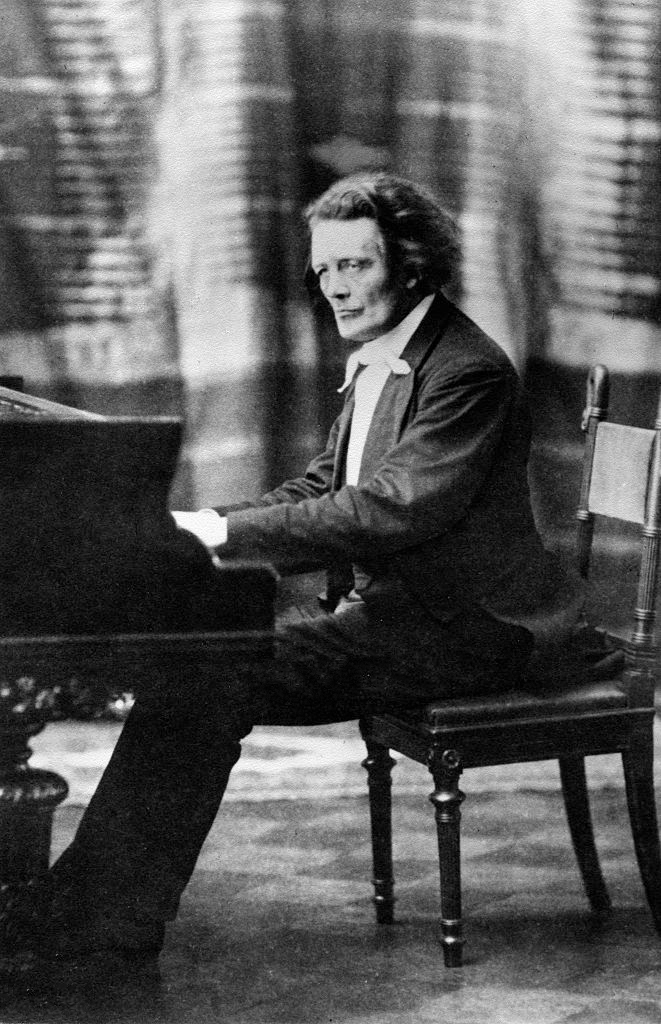
Rubinstein at the piano

Villoing had worked with Rubinstein on hand position and finger dexterity. From watching Liszt, Rubinstein had learned about freedom of arm movement. Theodor Leschetizky, who taught piano at the Saint Petersburg Conservatory when it opened, likened muscular relaxation at the piano to a singer's deep breathing. He would remark to his students about "what deep breaths Rubinstein used to take at the beginning of long phrases, and also what repose he had and what dramatic pauses."

In his book The Great Pianists, former New York Times critic Harold C. Schonberg describes Rubinstein's playing as that "of extraordinary breadth, virility and vitality, immense sonority and technical grandeur in which all too often technical sloppiness asserted itself." When caught up in the moment of performance, Rubinstein did not seem to care how many wrong notes he played as long as his conception of the piece he was playing came through. Rubinstein himself admitted, after a concert in Berlin in 1875, "If I could gather up all the notes that I let fall under the piano, I could give a second concert with them."

Part of the problem might have been the sheer size of Rubinstein's hands. They were huge, and many observers commented on them. Josef Hofmann observed that Rubinstein's fifth finger "was as thick as my thumb—think of it! Then his fingers were square at the ends, with cushions on them. It was a wonderful hand." Pianist Josef Lhévinne described them as "fat, pudgy ... with fingers so broad at the finger-tips that he often had difficulty in not striking two notes at once." The German piano teacher Ludwig Deppe advised American pianist Amy Fay to watch carefully how Rubinstein struck his chords: "Nothing cramped about him! He spreads his hands as if he were going to take in the universe, and takes them up with the greatest freedom and abandon!"

Because of the slap-dash moments in Rubinstein's playing, some more academic, polished players, especially German-trained ones, seriously questioned Rubinstein's greatness. Those who valued interpretation as much or more than pure technique found much to praise. Pianist and conductor Hans von Bülow called Rubinstein "the Michelangelo of music." The German critic Ludwig Rellstab called him "the Hercules of the piano; the Jupiter Tonans of the instrument."

=== Tone ===
Pressman attested to the singing quality of Rubinstein's playing, and much more: "His tone was strikingly full and deep. With him the piano sounded like a whole orchestra, not only as far as the power of sound was concerned but in the variety of timbres. With him, the piano sang as Patti sang, as Rubini sang."

Schonberg has assessed Rubinstein's piano tone the most sensuous of any of the great pianists. Fellow pianist Rafael Joseffy compared it to "a golden French horn." Rubinstein himself told an interviewer, "Strength with lightness, that is one secret of my touch... I have sat hours trying to imitate the timbre of Rubini's voice in my playing."

Rubinstein told the young Rachmaninoff how he achieved that tone. "Just press upon the keys until the blood oozes from your fingertips". When he wanted to, Rubinstein could play with extreme lightness, grace and delicacy. He rarely displayed that side of his nature, however. He had learned quickly that audiences came to hear him thunder, so he accommodated them. Rubinstein's forceful playing and powerful temperament made an especially strong impression during his American tour, where playing of this kind had never been heard before. During this tour, Rubinstein received more press attention than any other figure until the appearance of Ignacy Jan Paderewski a generation later.

=== Programs ===
Rubinstein's concert programs were often gargantuan. Hanslick mentioned in his 1884 review that the pianist played more than 20 pieces in one concert in Vienna, including three sonatas (the Schumann F sharp minor sonata plus Beethoven's D minor and Op. 101 in A). Rubinstein was a man with an extremely robust constitution and apparently never tired; audiences apparently stimulated his adrenals to the point where he acted like a superman. He had a colossal repertoire and an equally colossal memory until he turned 50, when he began to have memory lapses and had to play from the printed note.

Rubinstein was most famous for his series of historical recitals—seven consecutive concerts covering the history of piano music. Each of these programs was enormous. The second, devoted to Beethoven sonatas, consisted of the Moonlight, Tempest, Waldstein, Appassionata, E minor, A major (Op. 101), E major (Op. 109) and C minor (Op. 111). Again, this was all included in one recital. The fourth concert, devoted to Schumann, contained the Fantasy in C, Kreisleriana, Symphonic Studies, Sonata in F sharp minor, a set of short pieces and Carnaval. This did not include encores, which Rubinstein sprayed liberally at every concert.

Rubinstein concluded his American tour with this series, playing the seven recitals over a nine-day period in New York City in May 1873.

Rubinstein played this series of historical recitals in Russia and throughout Eastern Europe. In Moscow he gave this series on consecutive Tuesday evenings in the Hall of the Nobility, repeating each concert the following morning in the German Club for the benefit of students, free of charge.

=== Rachmaninoff on Rubinstein ===
Sergei Rachmaninoff first attended Rubinstein's historical concerts as a twelve-year-old piano student. Forty-four years later he told his biographer Oscar von Riesemann, "[His playing] gripped my whole imagination and had a marked influence on my ambition as a pianist."

Rachmaninoff explained to von Riesemann, "It was not so much his magnificent technique that held one spellbound as the profound, spiritually refined musicianship, which spoke from every note and every bar he played and singled him out as the most original and unequalled pianist in the world."

Rachmaninoff's detailed description to von Riesemann is of interest:

Once he repeated the whole finale of [Chopin's] Sonata in B minor, perhaps he had not succeeded in the short crescendo at the end as he would have wished. One listened entranced, and could have heard the passage over and over again, so unique was the beauty of tone... I have never heard the virtuoso piece Islamey by Balakirev, as Rubinstein played it, and his interpretation of Schumann's little fantasy The Bird as Prophet was inimitable in poetic refinement: to describe the diminuendo of the pianissimo at the end of the "fluttering away of the little bird" would be hopelessly inadequate. Inimitable, too, was the soul-stirring imagery in the Kreisleriana, the last (G minor) passage of which I have never heard anyone play in the same manner. One of Rubinstein's greatest secrets was his use of the pedal. He himself very happily expressed his ideas on the subject when he said, "The pedal is the soul of the piano." No pianist should ever forget this.

Rachmaninoff biographer Barrie Martyn suggests that it might not have been by chance that the two pieces Rachmaninoff singled out for praise from Rubinstein's concerts—Beethoven's Appassionata and Chopin's "Funeral March" Sonata—both became cornerstones of Rachmaninoff's own recital programs. Martyn also maintains that Rachmaninoff may have based his interpretation of the Chopin sonata on Rubinstein's traversal, pointing out similarities between written accounts of Rubinstein's version and Rachmaninoff's audio recording of the work.

Rachmaninoff admitted that Rubinstein was not note-perfect at these concerts, remembering a memory lapse during Balakirev's Islamey, where Rubinstein improvised in the style of the piece until remembering the rest of it four minutes later. In Rubinstein's defense, however, Rachmaninoff said that "for every possible mistake [Rubinstein] may have made, he gave, in return, ideas and musical tone pictures that would have made up for a million mistakes."

== Conducting ==
Rubinstein conducted the Russian Musical Society programs from the organization's inception in 1859 until his resignation from it and the Saint Petersburg Conservatory in 1867. He also did his share of guest conducting both before and after his tenure with the RMS. Rubinstein at the podium was as temperamental as when at the keyboard, provoking mixed reactions amongst both orchestral musicians and audiences.

== Teacher ==
As a composition teacher, Rubinstein could inspire his students and was noted for his generosity in time and effort he spent working with them, even after a full day of administrative work. He could also be exacting and expected as much from them as he gave to them. According to one of Tchaikovsky's fellow students, Alexandr Rubets, Rubinstein would sometimes begin class by reading some verses, then assign them to be set for either solo voice or chorus, depending on the student's preference. This assignment would be due the following day. At other times, he would expect students to improvise a minuet, a rondo, a polonaise or some other musical form.

Rubinstein warned his students continually to guard against timidity, not to stop at a difficult place in a composition but to leave it and press ahead. He also encouraged them to write in sketches with indications of whatever form in which that piece would be written and to avoid composing at the piano. Notable students include pianists Leopold Winkler, Josef Hofmann, and Sandra Drouker.

== Composition ==
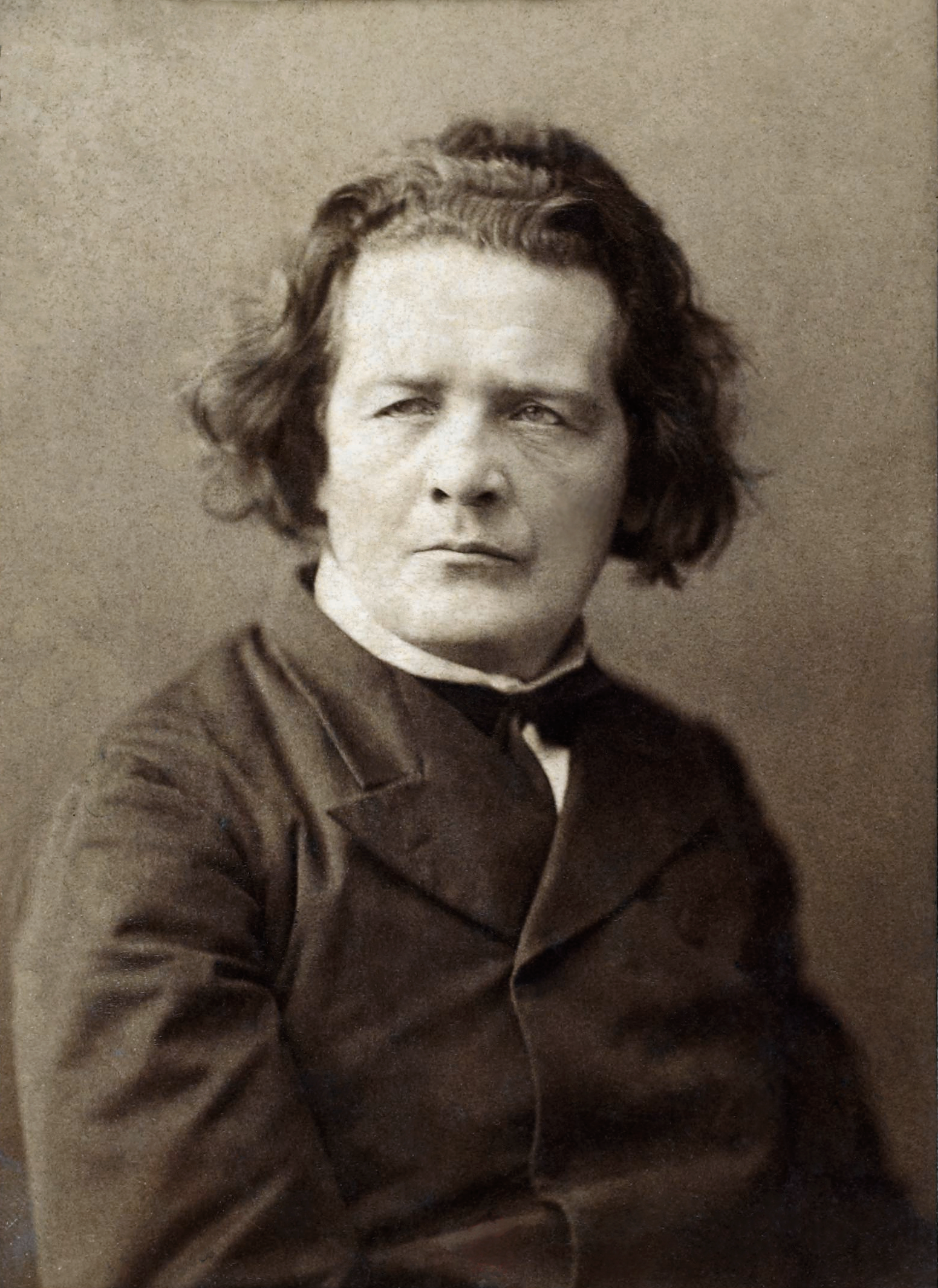
Photo of Rubinstein by J Ganz, Brussels

By 1850, Rubinstein had decided that he did not want to be known solely as a pianist, "but as a composer performing his symphonies, concertos, operas, trios, etc." Rubinstein was a prolific composer, writing no fewer than twenty operas (notably The Demon, written after Lermontov's Romantic poem, and its successor The Merchant Kalashnikov), five piano concertos, six symphonies and many solo piano works along with a substantial output of works for chamber ensemble, two concertos for cello and one for violin, free-standing orchestral works and tone poems (including one entitled Don Quixote). Edward Garden writes in the New Grove,

Rubinstein composed assiduously during all periods of his life. He was able, and willing, to dash off for publication half a dozen songs or an album of piano pieces with all too fluent ease in the knowledge that his reputation would ensure a gratifying financial reward for the effort involved.

Rubinstein and Mikhail Glinka, considered the first important Russian classical composer, had both studied in Berlin with pedagogue Siegfried Dehn. Glinka, as Dehn's student 12 years before Rubinstein, used the opportunity to amass greater reserves of compositional skill that he could use to open up a whole new territory of Russian music. Rubinstein, conversely, chose to exercise his compositional talents within the German styles illustrated in Dehn's teaching. Robert Schumann and Felix Mendelssohn were the strongest influences on Rubinstein's music.

Consequently, Rubinstein's music demonstrates none of the nationalism of The Five. Rubinstein also had a tendency to rush in composing his pieces, resulting in good ideas such as those in his Ocean Symphony being developed in less-than-exemplary ways. As Paderewski was later to remark, "He had not the necessary concentration of patience for a composer... He was prone to indulge in grandiloquent cliches at moments of climax, preceded by over-lengthy rising sequences which were subsequently imitated by Tchaikovsky in his less-inspired pieces." Nevertheless, Rubinstein's Fourth Piano Concerto

greatly influenced Tchaikovsky's piano concertos, especially the first (1874–5), and the superb finale, with its introduction and scintillating principal subject, is the basis of very similar material at the beginning of the finale of Balakirev's Piano Concerto in E-flat major ... The first movement of Balakirev's concerto had been written, partially under the influence of Rubinstein's Second Concerto, in the 1860s.

After Rubinstein's death, his works began to lose popularity, although his piano concerti remained in the repertoire in Europe until the First World War, and his principal works have retained a toehold in the Russian concert repertoire. Perhaps somewhat lacking in individuality, Rubinstein's music was unable to compete either with the established classics or with the new Russian style of Stravinsky and Prokofiev.

Over recent years, his work has been performed a little more often both in Russia and abroad, and has often met with positive criticism. Amongst his better known works are the opera The Demon, his Piano Concerto No. 4, and his Symphony No. 2, known as The Ocean.

== Rubinstein's repartee ==
Rubinstein was as well known during his lifetime for his sarcasm as well as his sometimes penetrating insight. During one of Rubinstein's visits to Paris, French pianist Alfred Cortot played the first movement of Beethoven's Appassionata for him. After a long silence, Rubinstein told Cortot, "My boy, don't you ever forget what I am going to tell you. Beethoven's music must not be studied. It must be reincarnated." Cortot reportedly never forgot those words.

Rubinstein's own piano students were held just as accountable: he wanted them to think about the music they were playing, matching the tone to the piece and the phrase. His manner with them was a combination of raw, sometimes violent criticism and good humor. Hofmann wrote of one such lesson:

Once I played a Liszt rhapsody pretty badly. After a little of it, Rubinstein said, "The way you play this piece would be all right for Auntie or Mamma." Then rising and coming toward me, he said, "Now let us see how we play such things."

... I began again, but I had not played more than a few measures when Rubinstein said loudly, "Have you begun?" "Yes, Master, I certainly have." "Oh," said Rubinstein vaguely, "I didn't notice." ... Rubinstein did not so much instruct me. Merely he let me learn from him ... If a student, by his own study and mental force, reached the desired point which the musician's wizardry had made him see, he gained reliance in his own strength, knowing he would always find that point again even though he should lose his way once or twice, as everyone with an honest aspiration is liable to do.

Rubinstein's insistence on absolute fidelity to the printed note surprised Hofmann, since he had heard his teacher take liberties himself in his concerts. When he asked Rubinstein to reconcile this paradox, Rubinstein answered, as many teachers have through the ages, "When you are as old as I am, you may do as I do." Then Rubinstein added, "If you can".

Nor did Rubinstein adjust the tenor of his comments for those of high rank. After Rubinstein had reassumed the directorship of the Saint Petersburg Conservatory, Tsar Alexander III donated the dilapidated old Bolshoi Theater as the Conservatory's new home—without the funds needed to restore and restructure the facility. At a reception given in the monarch's honor, the Tsar asked Rubinstein if he was pleased with this gift. Rubinstein replied bluntly, to the crowd's horror, "Your Imperial Majesty, if I gave you a beautiful cannon, all mounted and embossed, with no ammunition, would you like it?"

== Rubinstein's voice ==
The following recording was made in Moscow in January 1890, by Julius Block (1858–1934) on behalf of Thomas Edison. Rubinstein is heard to make a complimentary remark about the phonograph recorder.

Rubinstein's voice
Recorded January 1890

Anton Rubinstein:	What a wonderful thing.	Какая прекрасная вещь ....хорошо... (in Russian)	Kakaya prekrasnaya veshch' ....khorosho...
Julius Block:	At last.	Наконец-то.	Nakonets-to.
Yelizaveta Lavrovskaya:	You're disgusting. How dare you call me crafty?	Противный *** да как вы смеете называть меня коварной?	Protivnyy *** da kak vy smeyete nazyvat' menya kovarnoy?
Vasily Safonov:	(sings)
Pyotr Tchaikovsky:	This trill could be better.	Эта трель могла бы быть и лучше.	Eta trel' mogla by byt' i luchshe.
Lavrovskaya:	(sings)
Tchaikovsky:	Block is a good fellow, but Edison is even better.	Блок молодец, но у Эдисона ещё лучше!	Blok molodets, no u Edisona yeshchyo luchshe!
Lavrovskaya:	(sings) A-o, a-o.	А-о, а-о.	A-o, a-o.
Safonov:	Peter Jurgenson in Moscow.	Peter Jurgenson in Moskau. (in German)	Peter Jurgenson in Moskau.
Tchaikovsky:	Who's speaking now? It seems like Safonov's voice.	Кто сейчас говорит? Кажется голос Сафонова.	Kto seychas govorit? Kazhetsya golos Safonova.
Safonov:	(whistles)
