= Die Königin von Saba =

Opera by Karl Goldmark

- Opera by Karl Goldmark
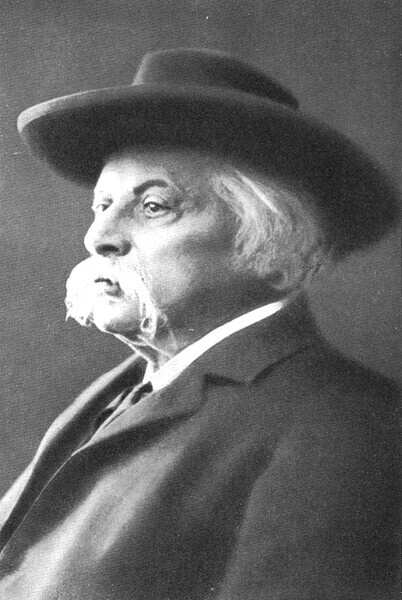
- The composer
- Librettist: Hermann Salomon Mosenthal
- Language: German
- Premiere: 10 March 1875; Hofoper, Vienna

Die Königin von Saba (The Queen of Sheba) is an opera in four acts by Karl Goldmark. The German libretto by Hermann Salomon Mosenthal sets a love triangle into the context of the Queen of Sheba's visit to the court of King Solomon, recorded in 1 Kings 10:1-13 (largely copied in 2 Chronicles 9:1–12). The plot centres on a love triangle not found in the Bible between the Queen of Sheba, Assad (an ambassador at the court of Solomon), and Sulamith (Assad's betrothed).

The opera was first performed at the Hofoper (now the State Opera) in Vienna, on 10 March 1875. While in the present-day the opera is rarely performed, its historical popularity led it to be staged over 250 times in Vienna in the late 19th and early 20th centuries. In the early 1900s, it was staged internationally at leading opera houses including the Metropolitan Opera and La Scala.

== Creating the opera ==
Goldmark's interest in the subject of the Queen of Sheba was inspired by his pupil, mezzo-soprano Caroline von Gomperz-Bettelheim, whose beauty was once compared to that of the Queen of Sheba by a friend of Goldmark. Bettelheim possessed a striking voice and the role was written to show off her wide range and dramatic skills. However, Bettelheim never performed the role, as the opera took twelve years to make it to the stage. Goldmark began working on the opera in 1863, but the first working libretto proved unsuitable. Mosenthal's libretto was provided two years later, but Goldmark was not satisfied with the happy ending. After some deliberation, Goldmark rewrote the ending of the opera to finish with the tragic death of Assad.

== Performance history ==
After a long gestation, Die Königin von Saba finally made it to the stage on 10 March 1875 at the Hofoper in Vienna. Although written for a mezzo-soprano, the role of the Queen of Sheba went to acclaimed dramatic soprano Amalie Materna, who was to originate several roles in Wagner's operas. The premiere was highly successful, partly due to the theatre manager's ability to persuade Goldmark to make sizable cuts following the dress rehearsal. Performances in numerous European cities followed, and the work became particularly popular in Italy for several decades. The opera made its United States premiere at the Metropolitan Opera on 2 December 1885.

== Roles ==
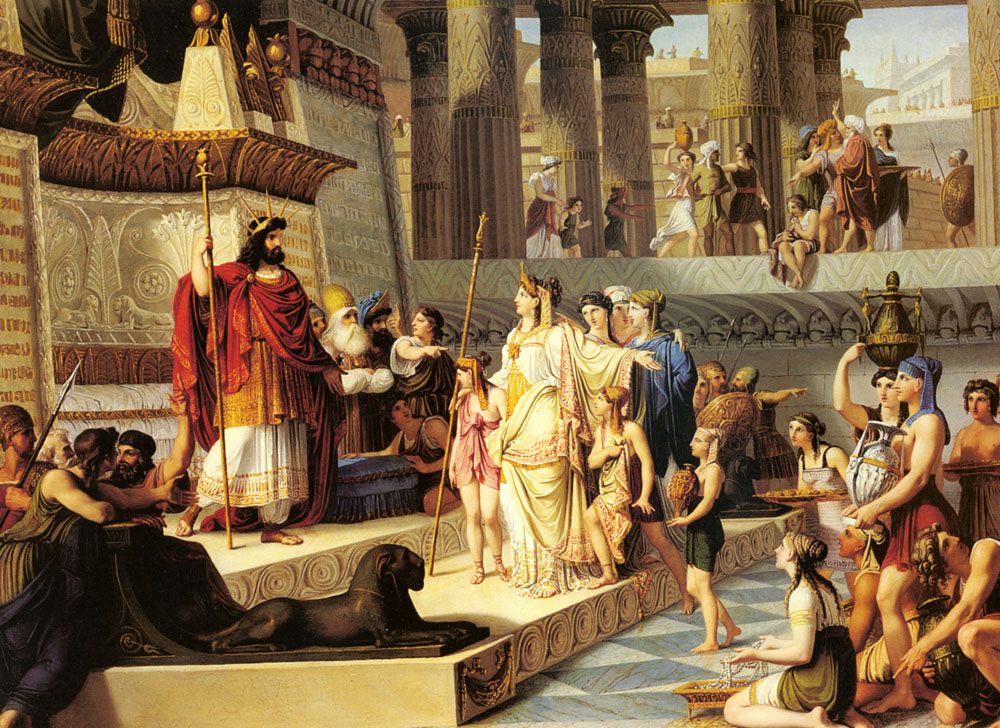
Solomon and the Queen of Sheba by Giovanni De Min (1789-1859)

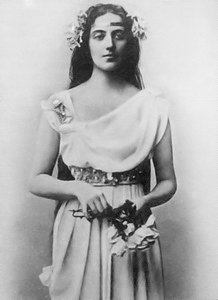
Solomiya Krushelnytska as Sulamith

Role	Voice type	Premiere Cast, 10 March 1875 (Conductor: - )
Assad	tenor	Gustav Walter
King Solomon	baritone	Johann Nepomuk Beck
Queen of Sheba	mezzo-soprano	Amalie Materna
Sulamith	soprano	Marie Wilt
Astaroth	soprano	Hermine von Siegstädt
Baal-Hanan	baritone	Theodor Lay
High priest	bass	Hans von Rokitansky
Guardian of the temple	bass	Hans von Rokitansky

== Synopsis ==
Place and Time: Jerusalem and the surrounding desert, 10th Century BC.

=== Act 1: A hall in Solomon’s palace ===
Sulamith, the daughter of the High Priest, is anxiously waiting for her fiancé, Assad, to return to court from his diplomatic assignment, so that he can plan for the arrival of the Queen of Sheba at the court of King Solomon. The couple are scheduled to marry the following day. Upon his return to the palace, Assad meets with Solomon and reveals to him that he has fallen in love with a mysterious woman among the cedar forests of Lebanon and does not love Sulamith. Before Solomon can reply, the Queen of Sheba arrives with her entourage. As she greets the king, she pulls back her veil, revealing to Assad that she is in fact the mysterious woman he had met on his journey. To Assad's confusion, the queen pretends not to know him. After the queen leaves, Solomon counsels Assad to not pursue his infatuation but to continue with his marriage to Sulamith.

=== Act 2: The garden of the palace at night ===
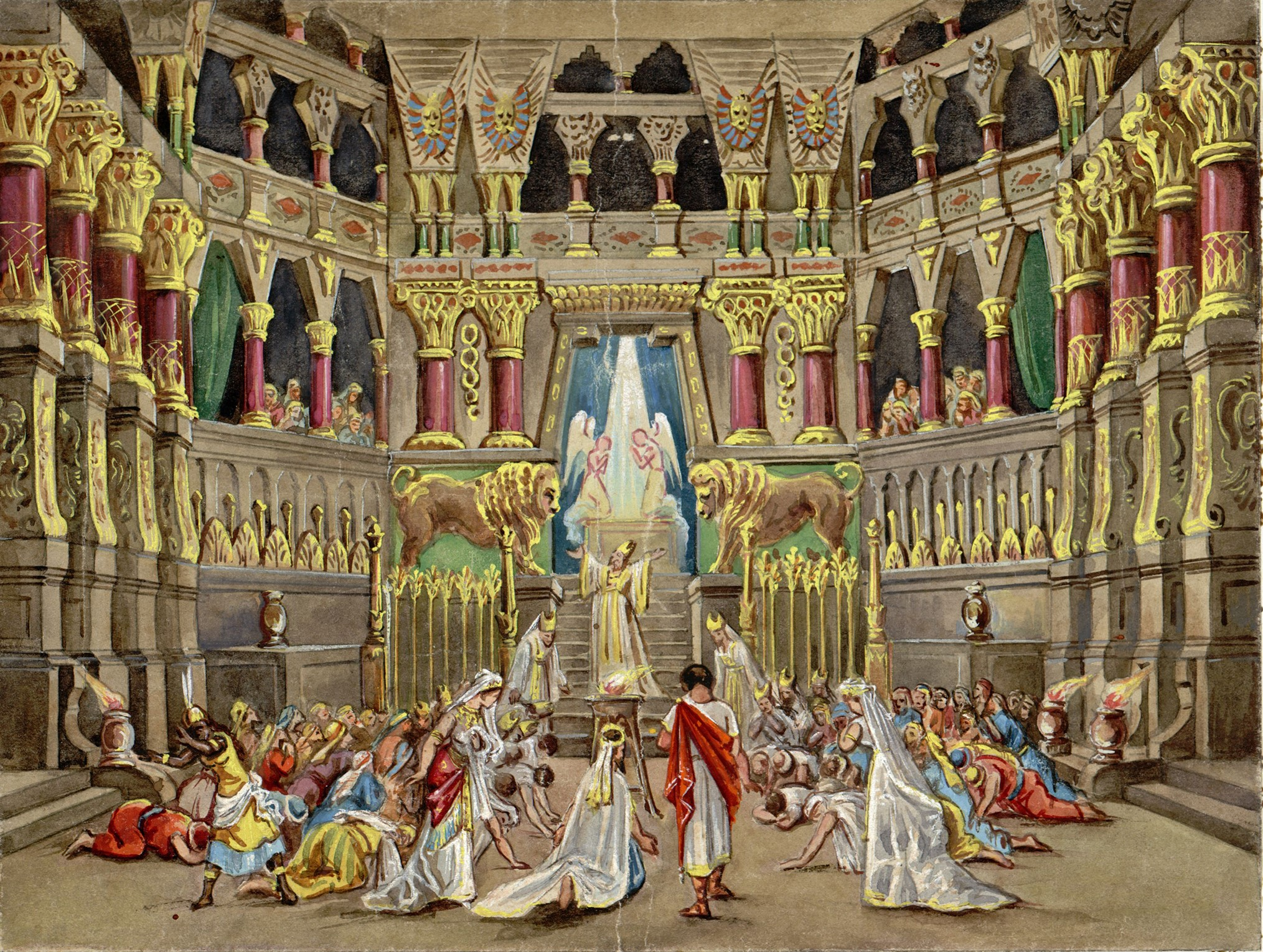
Il Tempio, set design for La Regina di Saba act 2 scene 2 (1879).

The Queen of Sheba has slipped away from the social gathering being held in her honor inside the palace. As she reflects on Assad's impending marriage, Astaroth, her slave, informs her that Assad is nearby and then proceeds to lure Assad to her mistress with a seductive oriental vocalise ("Magische Töne"). Assad and the Queen engage in a fervent conversation that climaxes in a passionate duet and embrace. The Guardian of the Temple arrives at daybreak and disrupts their tryst with a call for the Sons of Israel to pray.

The wedding party arrives and Assad and Sulamith are about to be married in front of the Ark of the Covenant when the Queen appears to give a wedding present. The Queen continues to treat Assad like a stranger which throws him into distress. He commits blasphemy by referring to the Queen as his god, causing an uproar which ends the wedding ceremony. Assad is led off to await punishment, most likely his execution.

=== Act 3: The court of King Solomon ===
Celebrations in honour of the Queen of Sheba continue with a performance of Bienentanz der Almeen, a ballet, and a bacchanal. Worried for Assad's fate, the Queen pleads for Solomon to give Assad mercy. He refuses and the Queen leaves plotting revenge. Sulamith, along with her companions, enter the court singing a mournful song. She too pleads for Assad's life to be spared in an aria that eventually culminates into a large ensemble. Still unmoved, Solomon replies with an ominous prophecy about Sulamith's fate. Distraught, she leaves the palace for the desert to bewail her impending future.

=== Act 4: The vicinity of Sulamith's desert retreat ===
Assad has been banished by Solomon to the desert. The Queen of Sheba seeks him out to attempt to convince him to come back with her to her kingdom. She finds him alone, not too far from Sulamith's retreat, and tries to seduce him. He rejects her advances and in a bitter soliloquy reveals his regret and desire for a death that might redeem his offense against God. Assad then prays for Sulamith, during which time he is engulfed in a violent sandstorm. He is later found barely alive by Sulamith and her companions. He begs for her forgiveness, which she bestows just before he dies in her arms.

== Musical analysis ==
"Erzählung"
Sung by Andreas Dippel in 1906 for Edison Records

Die Königin von Saba is written in the style of grand opera; with the usual large-scale cast and orchestra, the use of local color, and a plot set in history all typical of that genre. The vocal writing includes solo recitative and aria passages, duets, and large-scale choruses. Notable moments of the opera include Assad’s short arietta "Magische Töne" in Act 2 and the final duet in Act 4, both of which display Goldmark's lyricism at its best.

Although Goldmark was never an ardent follower of Wagner, the orchestration of Die Königin von Saba is reminiscent of the effects and formal fluidity that characterized so much of Wagner's work. Although Goldmark never adopted a fully-fledged system of leitmotifs, certain passages are reminiscent of Tristan und Isolde. The work also shows some influence of the dramatic sensibilities of Meyerbeer.

Although these are obvious influences in the work, Goldmark's individuality is apparent. The music for the Queen of Sheba displays a sultry eroticism with oriental flair. The music for the High Priest and other religious characters recalls Jewish religious music and at times the music of Sarastro in The Magic Flute. The religious character of these parts of the opera may well have been influenced by the ideas of the great Viennese cantor Salomon Sulzer, who was concerned with restoring Jewish music to its oriental origins.

== Recordings ==
- Karl Goldmark: Die Königin von Saba - Complete recording from a live 1970 performance of the work by the American Opera Society Orchestra conducted by Reynald Giovaninetti with Arley Reece as Assad and Alpha Floyd as the Queen of Sheba. The CD also includes excerpts from the opera in a studio recording made in Vienna (1903–1909) with Leo Slezak as Assad and Elsa Bland as the Queen of Sheba). Label: Gala
- Karl Goldmark: Die Königin von Saba - Complete 1980 studio recording by the Hungarian State Opera, conducted by Ádám Fischer with Siegfried Jerusalem as Assad and Klara Takács at the Queen of Sheba. Label: Hungaroton
- Karl Goldmark: Die Königin von Saba - Assad's act 2 aria "Magische Töne", recorded in 1967 by Nicolai Gedda with the Orchester des Bayreischen Staatsoper, Munich, conducted by Giuseppe Patanè. Label: EMI.
- Karl Goldmark Die Königin von Saba - Complete : Oper Freiburg, Karoly Szemerdy, Jin Seok Lee, Irma Mihelic, Nuttaporn Thammathi, Kevin Moreno, Philharmonisches Orchester Freiburg, Fabrice Bollon CPO
