= Servilia (opera) =

Opera by Nikolai Rimsky-Korsakov

- Opera by Nikolai Rimsky-Korsakov
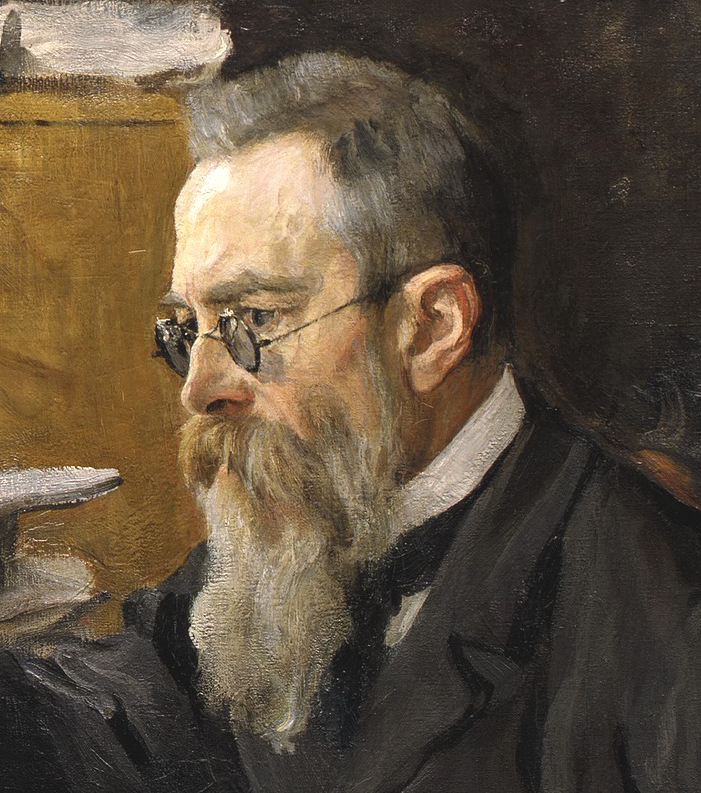
- The composer in 1898
- Native title: Russian: Сервилия, romanized: Serviliya
- Librettist: Rimsky-Korsakov
- Language: Russian
- Based on: drama by Lev Mey
- Premiere: 1902; Mariinsky Theatre, St. Petersburg

Servilia (Russian: Сервилия, romanized: Servilya, the name of a main character), is an opera in five acts by Nikolai Rimsky-Korsakov. The work was completed in 1901, and was first performed in 1902 in St. Petersburg, Russia. The composer wrote the libretto, which is based on the drama by Lev Alexandrovich Mey. The story is set in Ancient Rome during Nero's reign.

== Performance history ==
The world premiere took place in St. Petersburg on 14 October (O.S. / 1 October) 1902 at the Mariinsky Theatre. It was the only one of Rimsky's late operas not performed in Mamontov's private theatre - conducted by Feliks Blumenfeld. A second performance took place in 1904, and a third in 1944. An LP of extracts from Act 3 scene 5 and Acts 4 scenes 5 and 6 was recorded in 1951 under Onisim Bron with Olga Piotrovskaya in the role of Servilia, Georgi Nelepp as Valery and Pavel Lisitsian as Egnaty.

Gennady Rozhdestvensky conducted the opera in 2016 at Moscow's Boris Pokrovsky Chamber Music Theatre, where it was recorded, though not released. Using the 2016 production as a starting point, it was revived on the New Stage of the Bolshoi Theatre in December 2025 conducted by Anton Grishanin, with Ramilya Minikhanova in the title role.

One aria, "My flowers" from Act 3 for Servilia («Цветы мои, и вы в палящий полдень»), has survived in the concert repertoire, and has been recorded by Galina Pisarenko, Renée Fleming and Nicole Car.

== Synopsis ==
Servilia, daughter of the senator Soranus, is desired by her father to contract an alliance with Trasea, but the latter, hearing of her preference for his adopted son Valerius, withdraws his suit. Egnatius, the freedman of Soranus, being enamoured of Servilia, conspires against his master and Trasea, and intimates to Servilia that her submission alone will secure their safety. Valerius has mysteriously disappeared, and Servilia, becoming a convert to Christianity, renounces the World. Called before the tribunal, Trasea and Soranus are sentenced to banishment, while Servilia is awarded to Egnatius. Valerius now returns, bearing a proclamation from Nero that the tribunal is dissolved. The sudden reappearance of her lover causes Servilia's death, and Valerius is only prevented from destroying himself by the intervention of his foster-father. Egnatius, in his woe, invokes the Divine Being, and the rest join him in acclaiming the Christian God.

== Sources ==
- Frolova-Walker, Marina (2003). "17. Grand opera in Russia; Three case-studies: Rogneda, The Maid of Orleans and Servilia". In David Charlton (ed.). The Cambridge Companion to Grand Opera. Cambridge Companions to Music. London: Cambridge University Press. pp. 355–363. ISBN 0-521-64683-9.
- Holden, Amanda (Ed.), The New Penguin Opera Guide, New York: Penguin Putnam, 2001. ISBN 0-14-029312-4
- "Servilia". Opera Glass at Stanford University.
- Taruskin, Richard (2007). L. Macy (ed.). "Servilia [Serviliya]". New Grove Dictionary of Opera / Grove Music Online.
