= Karl Goldmark =

Hungarian and Austrian composer (1830–1915)

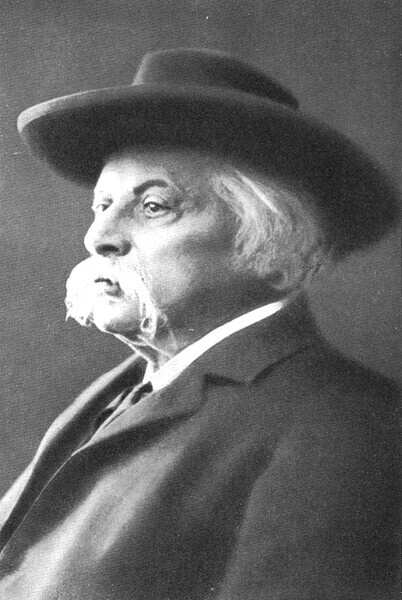
Karl Goldmark

Karl Goldmark (born Károly Goldmark, Keszthely, 18 May 1830 – Vienna, 2 January 1915) was a Hungarian and Austrian composer.

== Life and career ==
Goldmark came from a large Jewish family. His father, Ruben Goldmark, was a chazan (cantor) to the Jewish congregation at Keszthely, Hungary, where Karl was born. Karl Goldmark's older brother Joseph became a physician and was later involved in the Revolution of 1848, and forced to emigrate to the United States. Karl Goldmark's early training as a violinist was at the Ödenburg music school in the city of Sopron (1842-3).

In 1844, Goldmark was sent to Vienna, where he was able to study for some eighteen months with Leopold Jansa before his money ran out. He prepared himself for entry first to the Vienna Technische Hochschule and then to the Vienna Conservatory to study the violin with Joseph Böhm and harmony with Gottfried Preyer. Until he became a member of Vienna's Carl Theatre in 1850, Goldmark was impoverished, surviving on menial odd jobs and handouts. The Revolution of 1848 forced the Conservatory to close down. Goldmark was largely self-taught as a composer. After the Conservatory's closing, Goldmark played violin for theaters and taught music to make ends meet. During this time, he honed his compositional talents. Goldmark's first concert, a self-organized show in Vienna (1858) met with hostility, and he returned to Budapest, returning to Vienna in 1860.

To make ends meet, Goldmark also pursued a side career as a music journalist. Johannes Brahms and Goldmark developed a friendship as Goldmark's prominence in Vienna grew.

Among the musical influences Goldmark absorbed was that of Richard Wagner, whose anti-semitism stood in the way of any genuine warmth between them. In 1872 Goldmark took a prominent role in the formation of the Vienna Wagner Society. He was made an honorary member of the Gesellschaft der Musikfreunde, received an honorary doctorate from the University of Budapest and shared with Richard Strauss an honorary membership in the Accademia di Santa Cecilia, Rome.

Goldmark's opera Die Königin von Saba ("The Queen of Sheba"), Op. 27 was celebrated during his lifetime and for some years thereafter. Though he had begun working on it after he first permanently settled in Vienna in 1860, it was first performed in Vienna on 10 March 1875. the work proved so popular that it remained in the repertoire of the Vienna Staatsoper continuously until 1938. He wrote six other operas as well (see list).

The Rustic Wedding Symphony (Ländliche Hochzeit), Op. 26 (first performed in 1876), a work that was kept in the repertory by Sir Thomas Beecham, includes five movements, like a suite composed of coloristic tone poems: a wedding march with variations depicting the wedding guests, a nuptial song, a serenade, a dialogue between the bride and groom in a garden, and a dance movement. It was very well received, including by Brahms.

His Violin Concerto No. 1 in A minor, Op. 28, was the piece of his played most during his lifetime. The concerto had its première in Bremen in 1877, initially enjoyed great popularity and then slid into obscurity. The concerto has started to re-enter the repertoire with recordings by such prominent violin soloists as Itzhak Perlman and Joshua Bell. Nathan Milstein also championed the work.

He wrote a second violin concerto, but it was never published. A second symphony in E♭, Op. 35, is much less well known. Goldmark also wrote an early symphony in C major, between roughly 1858 and 1860. That work was never given an opus number and only the scherzo seems to have ever been published.

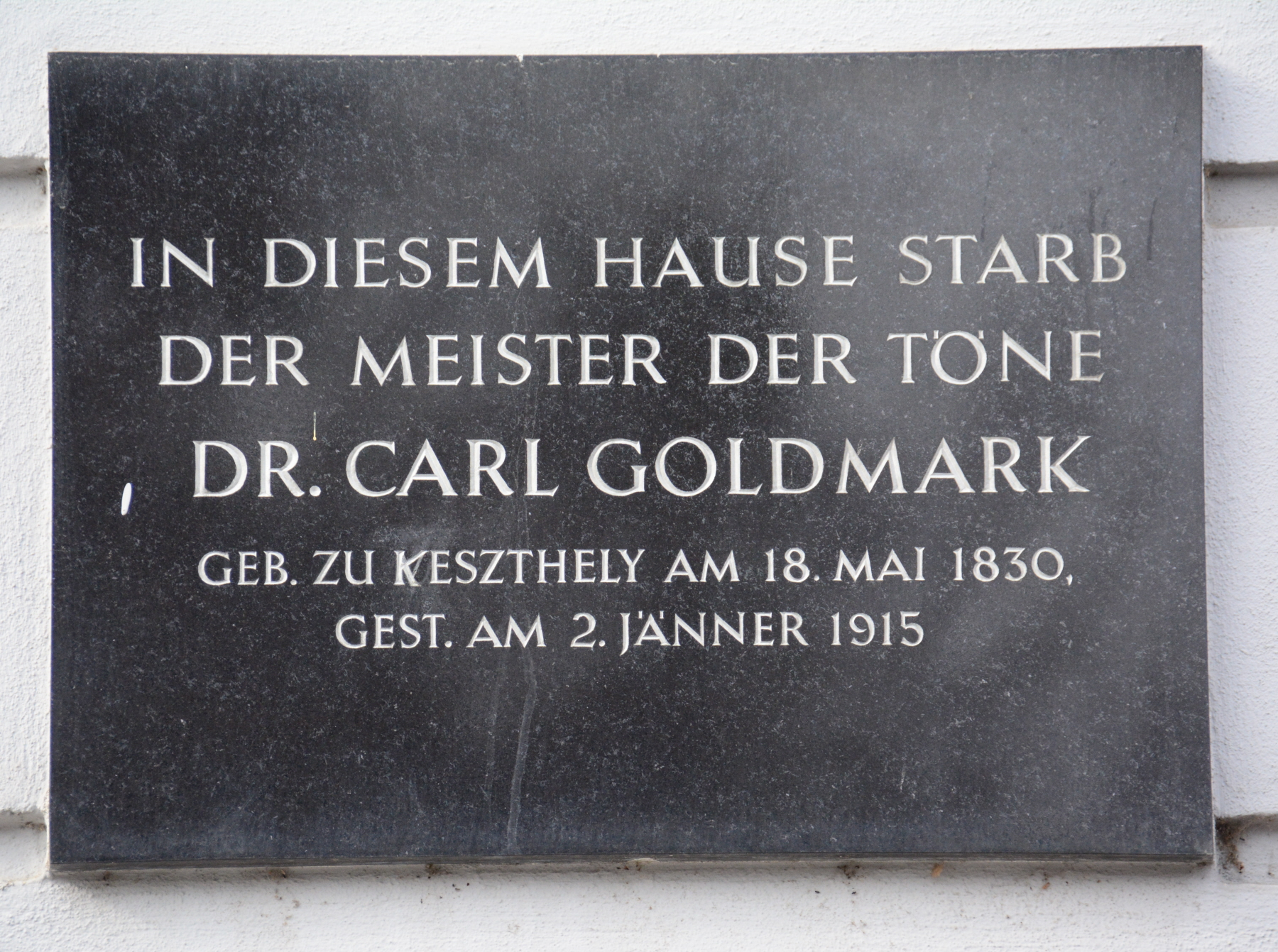
Memorial for Goldmark in Vienna

Goldmark's chamber music, in which the influences of Schumann and Mendelssohn are paramount, although critically well received in his lifetime, is now rarely heard. It includes the String Quintet in A minor Op. 9 that made his first reputation in Vienna, the Violin Sonata in D major Op. 25, two Piano Quintets in B♭ major, Op. 30 and C♯ minor, Op. 54, the Cello Sonata Op. 39, and the work that first brought Goldmark's name into prominence in the Viennese musical world, the String Quartet in B♭ Op. 8 (his only work in that genre). He also composed choral music, two Suites for Violin and Piano (in D major, Op. 11, and in E♭ major, Op. 43), and numerous concert overtures, such as the Sakuntala Overture Op. 13 (a work which cemented his fame after his String Quartet), the Penthesilea Overture Op. 31, the In the Spring Overture Op. 36, the Prometheus Bound Overture Op. 38, the Sappho Overture Op. 44, the In Italy Overture Op. 49, and the Aus Jugendtagen Overture, Op. 53. Other orchestral works include the symphonic poem Zrínyi, Op. 47, and two orchestral scherzos, in E minor, Op. 19, and in A major, Op. 45.

Goldmark's nephew Rubin Goldmark (1872–1936), a pupil of Dvořák, was also a composer, who spent his career in New York.

== Death ==
Goldmark died in Vienna and is buried in the Zentralfriedhof (Central Cemetery), along with many other notable composers. Many of his autograph manuscripts are in the collection of the National Széchényi Library, with "G" catalogue numbers attached to various works (including those without opus number.)

== List of works ==
=== Operas ===
- Die Königin von Saba (The Queen of Sheba) (1875)
- Merlin (1886)
- Das Heimchen am Herd (1896), adapted from Dickens's The Cricket on the Hearth.
- Der Fremdling (1897) (The Changeling)
- Die Kriegsgefangene (1899), (The Prisoner of War) a Trojan War story taking Achilles' captive Briseis as central figure.
- Götz von Berlichingen (1902), after Goethe's play about the historical figure
- Ein Wintermärchen (1908), adapted from Shakespeare's The Winter's Tale.

=== Symphonies ===
- Rustic Wedding Symphony, Op. 26
- Symphony No. 2 in E♭, Op. 35

=== Works for Orchestra ===
- Sakuntala, Op. 13 (concert overture)
- Scherzo in E minor, Op. 19
- Penthesilea, Op. 31 (concert overture)
- Im Frühling (In Springtime), Op. 36 (concert overture)
- Sappho, Op. 44 (concert overture)
- Scherzo in A major, Op. 45
- Zrínyi, Op. 47 (symphonic poem)
- In Italien (In Italy), Op. 49 (concert overture)
- Aus Jugendtagen (From Youthful Days), Op. 53

(Note: All above works have been recorded by the Bamberg Symphony Orchestra under Fabrice Bollon for cpo label: Vol. 1 555 160-2 and Vol. 2 555 251–2.)

=== Concerti ===
- Violin Concerto No. 1 in A minor, Op. 28
- Violin Concerto No. 2 (unpublished)

=== Chamber music ===
- Ballad for Violin and Piano, Op. 54
- Piano Quintet in B♭ major, Op. 30
- Piano Quintet in C♯ minor, Op. 54
- Romanze for Violin and Piano
- Sonata for Violin and Piano, Op. 25
- Sonata for Cello and Piano, Op. 39
- Piano Trio, Op. 33, No. 2
- Piano Trio, Op. 4
- String Quartet in B♭ major, Op. 8
- Suite for Violin and Piano in D major, Op. 11
- Suite in A major for Violin and Piano
- String Quintet in A minor, Op. 9

=== Piano works (solo unless indicated) ===
- Sturm und Drang, nine characteristic pieces, Op. 5
- Three Pieces for Piano Duet, Op. 12
- Hungarian Dances for Piano Duet, Op. 22 (later orchestrated by the composer)
- Zwei Novelletten, Op. 29
- Georginen, six pieces, Op. 52

=== Choral works ===
- Regenlied for unaccompanied chorus, Op. 10
- Two Pieces for unaccompanied men's chorus, Op. 14
- Frühlingsnetz for men's chorus, 4 horns, and piano, Op. 15
- Meeresstille und glückliche Fahrt for men's chorus and horns, Op. 16
- Two Pieces for unaccompanied men's chorus, Op. 17
- Frühlingshymne for contralto, chorus, and orchestra, Op. 23
- Im Fuschertal, a set of six choral songs, Op. 24
- Psalm CXIII for solo voices, chorus, and orchestra, Op. 40
- Two Pieces for unaccompanied men's chorus, Op. 41
- Two Four-Part Songs with piano accompaniment, Op. 42

=== Lieder ===
- 12 Gesänge, Op. 18
- Beschwörung, Op. 20
- 4 Lieder, Op. 21
- 7 Lieder aus dem 'Wilden Jäger', Op. 32
- 4 Lieder, Op. 34
- 8 Lieder, Op. 37 (Leipzig, 1888 or 1889);
- Wer sich die Musik erkiest (for piano and four solo voices), Op. 42
- 6 Lieder, Op. 46
