= General Staff of Defence (Moldova) =

The General Staff of Defence (Statul Major al Apărării) is the institution responsible for the leadership, organization and planning of the operations of the Moldovan National Army and its sub branches: the Land Forces and the Air Force, subordinate to the Ministry of Defense.

== Purpose ==
The General Staff is responsible for planning combat and training activities and improves the mobilization capacity of troops as well as operational combat and mobilization training. The position of Chief of the General Staff of the National Army executes the paramount leadership of the troops and assists the President of the Republic and the Minister of Defense in commanding the National Army.

== History ==
The General Staff of the National Army was established on April 24, 1992, in the midst of the Transnistrian War. The first head of the General Staff was Colonel Pavel Chirău, who took office in April 1994. On 13 May 2026, the Munteanu Cabinet approved the change of the name from General Staff to General Staff of Defence (also referred to as Defence Staff). According to Defence Minister Anatolie Nosatii, the reorganization was designed to streamline the command structure along NATO, specifically Romanian lines.

== Present leaders ==
Function	Rank	Name	Photo
Chief of the General Staff	Brigadier General	Vitalie Micov	
Deputy Chief of the General Staff for Defense Resources	Brigadier General	Sergiu Voinu	
Deputy Chief of General Staff for Operations and Training	Brigadier General	Ion Ojog	
Master Sergeant of the National Army	Senior Sergeant	Andrei Cojocaru	

== Structure ==
- General Staff (J1)
  - Personnel Directorate (J2)
  - Operations Directorate (J3)
  - Directorate of Logistics (J4)
  - Strategic Planning Directorate (J5)
  - Communication and Information Systems Directorate (J6)
    - Center of Communications and Informatics
  - Doctrine and Joint Training Directorate (J7)
  - Management, Coordination and Monitoring Directorate
  - Law Department
  - Health Department
- Economic and Financial Department
- Secretariat and Internal Management Department
- Legal Department
- Human Resources Management Department
- Defense Policy and Defense Planning Division
- General Inspection Directorate
- Public Relations Service
- General Staff Regiment "Brigadier General Nicolae Petrică"
  - Military police

== General Staff organization in detail ==
=== Operations Directorate ===
The Operations Directorate develops operational plans on the engagement of the National Army during peacetime and crisis situations.

=== Logistics Directorate ===
The Directorate of Logistics implements policies issued by the Ministry of Defence concerning logistic support. It also manages, monitors and organises the distribution of material goods for troops. It has centralized archive of the record of weapons, military equipment, and ammunition.

=== General Staff Regiment ===
The General Staff Regiment "Brigadier General Nicolae Petrica" was founded on 8 July 2020. It is named in honor of Brigadier General Nicolae Petrica, commander of the National Army from 1992-1993.

Following the start of the Russo-Ukrainian war, the regiment assisted the Single Crisis Management Center in coordinating the logistical response to the influx of Ukrainian refugees entering Moldova. The Military Police Section of the regiment has duties that include operative coordination, on the monitoring and protection of military personnel, guarding military installations, ensuring military discipline and order. It also controls the direction of the military car technique in road traffic.

=== Cyber Incident Response Center ===
The Cyber Incident Response Center of the National Army was established in early 2021 with NATO support, with the purpose being to "increase the Ministry of Defence’s posture and capacity to respond to cyber threats".

== See also ==
- Romanian General Staff
