= Nicolae Petrică =

Moldovan general (1944-2018)

- Born: 24 December 1944; Oziornoie, Izmail Raion, Ukrainian SSR, Soviet Union (now Ukraine)
- Died: 4 July 2018 (aged 73); Moldova
- Military career
- Allegiance: Soviet Union (until 1991); Moldova
- Branch: Soviet Army; Moldovan Ground Forces
- Service years: 1964–2016
- Rank: Brigadier General
- Conflicts: Soviet-Afghan War; Transnistria War

Nicolae Petrică was a Moldovan general who served as one of the original officers of the Moldovan National Army.

== Early life and Soviet Army career ==
Petrică was born on December 24, 1944, in the village of Oziornoie, Izmail Raion in today's Ukraine. He joined the Soviet Army in 1964, being admitted as a student at the Kazan Higher Tank Command School, which he graduated with honors. Later, he continued his military service as an officer in the Guards Tank Regiment in Germany. At his personal request, in 1968, he was transferred to the tank regiment in Chisinau, Moldovan SSR, where he advanced from platoon commander to battalion commander. In 1977 he graduated from the Malinovsky Military Armored Forces Academy in Moscow, and was later assigned to serve in the Russian Far East. From 11 March 1985 to 24 May 1987 he was assigned to serve in Afghanistan as an advisor to the division commander, where he led and participated in 26 combat actions and operations.

In the same period he was appointed deputy head of the Tashkent Higher Tank Command and Engineering School.

== Moldovan National Army ==
In 1992, he chose to continue his military service in the Moldovan National Army, being appointed head of the Combat Training Directorate of the Ministry of Defense. During the military conflict on the left bank of the Dniester he was appointed commander of the Cocieri bridgehead, and on 4 August 1992, the commander of the Peacekeeping Forces of Moldova. From 1992 to 1993 he held the position of Chief of the General Staff, Commander of the National Army, and First Deputy Minister of Defense of Moldova. He had been active as Head of the Military Department of the Technical University of Moldova since October 10, 2002 up until 2016.

Petrică was promoted to the rank of brigadier general on June 6, 1993, by the President of Moldova, Mircea Snegur. He died on 4 July 2018. On 6 July, his funeral took place in the Column Hall of the Center for Military Culture and History. The General Staff Regiment "Brigadier General Nicolae Petrică" is named in his honor.

== Awards and decorations ==
- Order of the Red Star
- Order of the Badge of Honor
- Medal "For Courage"
- Order of Ștefan cel Mare
