= Eduard Ohladciuc =

Moldovan military officer (born 1969)

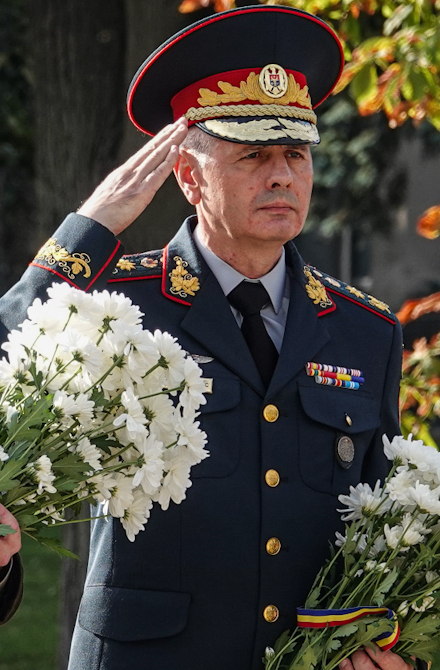
- Born: October 11, 1969 (age 57); Burlănești, Edineț District, Moldovan SSR, Soviet Union
- Military career
- Allegiance: Moldova
- Branch: Moldovan National Army
- Service years: 1992–2024
- Rank: Brigadier general
- Commands: Chief of the General Staff of the National Army

Eduard Ohladciuc (born 11 October 1969) is a Moldovan Brigadier general who served as the Chief of the General Staff of the National Army from November 2021 until September 2024.

== Military career ==
Ohladciuc was born on 11 October 1969 in Burlănești, Edineț District. He served in the Soviet Army from 1987 to 1992. He graduated from the Nizhegorodsk Higher Air Defense Rocket School in 1991. In 1992, he joined the Armed Forces of the Republic of Moldova. He served as commander of the S-200 Rocket Division from 1997 to 2000. He received training at several military institutions, including the National Defense University in Bucharest and the George C. Marshall European Center for Security Studies. He served as director of the facility management department of the General Staff from 2014 to 2015. He also served as Deputy Chief of the General Staff for Operations and Exercises.

On October 6, 2021, Defense Minister Anatolie Nosatîi nominated Ohladciuc for the position of Chief of the General Staff at a government meeting.

On 8 November 2021, he succeeded Igor Gorgan as the Chief of the General Staff. During his tenure, Ohladciuc focused on the modernization of the security and defense sector, as well as strengthening partnerships with NATO and the United States.

In September 2024, following the expiration of his military service contract, the Government proposed his discharge from active duty. President Maia Sandu officially signed the decree on his dismissal on 27 September 2024, and he was subsequently succeeded by Brigadier General Vitalie Micov.
