= Vitalie Stoian =

Moldovan brigadier general (born 1970)

- Born: June 10, 1970 (age 56); Chișinău, Moldavian SSR, Soviet Union
- Military career
- Allegiance: Moldova
- Branch: Moldovan National Army
- Service years: 1988–2016
- Rank: Brigadier general
- Commands: Chief of the General Staff
- Conflicts: Iraq War

Vitalie Stoian (born 10 June 1970) is a Moldovan brigadier general who served as the Chief of the General Staff of the Moldovan National Army from 2011 to 2013. He also served as the Military Representative of Moldova to NATO from 2013 to 2016.

== Early life and education ==
Stoian was born in Chișinău in 1970. He attended the Military High School in the capital from 1985 to 1988 before completing his military officer training at the Kamenets-Podolskii Higher Military Engineering Command School of the Soviet Army in Ukraine, graduating in 1992.

== Military career ==
In 1994, 1997, and 2000, he participated in mine clearing and peacekeeping operations along the security zone following the Transnistria War, leading demining details in Copanca, Chircăiești, Chițcani, and Pohrebea.

Between 2000 and 2006, Stoian served in various engineering and staff roles, including Chief of Chemical-Engineering Services for the 3rd Motorized Infantry Brigade "Dacia" and Chief of the Engineering Service of the National Army.

Stoian served two operational deployments during the Iraq War as commander of the Moldovan military contingent within the Multinational Force – Iraq. Upon returning to Moldova, he served as Deputy Head of the Intelligence Directorate (2007–2009), Head of the Training and Doctrine Directorate (2009–2010), and Director of the General Staff (2010–2011). In the lattermost position, on 27 August 2011, he commanded the Chișinău Independence Day Parade on Great National Assembly Square celebrating the 20th anniversary of independence.

On 18 November 2011, Stoian was appointed Chief of the General Staff, succeeding Brigadier General Iurie Dominic. In May 2013, Stoian and Major General Gregory Lusk, Adjutant General of the North Carolina National Guard, signed an agreement establishing unit-to-unit partnerships between the National Army and the North Carolina National Guard as part of the State Partnership Program. Stoian concluded his term on 7 August 2013 and was succeeded by Igor Gorgan. The official handover ceremony took place on 6 September.

From 2013 to 2016, Stoian served as the Military Representative of Moldova to NATO and the European Union Military Committee in Brussels. He was also made Moldova's defense attaché to Kingdom of Belgium.

== Later career ==
In 2016, following his retirement from military service, Stoian was appointed Head of the Military Department at the Technical University of Moldova in Chișinău.

== Personal life ==
He speaks Romanian, Russian, German and English. He is married and has two children.

== Awards and honors ==
- Order of Allegiance to the Fatherland, 3rd Class (2006)
- Medal "For Bravery" (2008)
- Medal for Military Merit (2000)
