= Iurie Dominic =

- Born: 15 May 1970 (age 56); Moldavian SSR, Soviet Union
- Allegiance: Moldova
- Branch: Moldovan National Army
- Service years: 1988–2011
- Rank: Brigadier general
- Commands: Chief of the General Staff

Iurie Dominic (born May 15, 1970) is a retired Moldovan brigadier general who served as the Chief of the General Staff of the Moldovan National Army from May 2010 to September 2011.

== Early life and military career ==
Dominic was born on 15 May 1970 in the Moldavian SSR. He received his early officer education at the Odesa Higher Military Command School of the Soviet Army in Ukraine, graduating in 1988.

He graduated from the English program at the Defense Language Institute, the United States Army Command and General Staff College at Fort Leavenworth, Kansas in 2004, and the National War College at the National Defense University in Washington, D.C.

On 27 May 2010, Dominic, a Colonel at the time, was appointed Chief of the General Staff under Defense Minister Vitalie Marinuța, whom had held the post concurrently with his cabinet role. He was promoted to Brigadier General on National Army Day later that year, the highest practical rank in the armed forces. During his term, Dominic advocated for dialogue between the armed forces and civil society as well as strengthening education links between Moldova and NATO.

== Dismissal and retirement ==
On 24 September 2011, acting President of Moldova Marian Lupu signed an order dismissing Dominic as Chief of the General Staff. The dismissal was motivated by concerns following an accidental shooting death in Cahul of a conscript soldier from the 3rd Motorized Infantry Brigade "Dacia" as well as a controversy surrounding an export sale of Moldovan military equipment vis-a-vis a Latvian arms broker to Libya and then to Armenia. The decision was supported by Prime Minister Vlad Filat. Dominic was succeeded by Brigadier General Vitalie Stoian on 18 November 2011 and subsequently retired into the military reserve during an official ceremony hosted by the Ministry of Defense.

He later became Advisor to the Minister of Defence.

== Honours and awards ==
- United States Army Command and General Staff College International Hall of Fame (2012)
