= Vladimir Donțul =

Moldovan military officer

Vladimir Donțul is a retired Moldovan military officer who served as Chief of the General Staff of the Moldovan National Army from March - December 1997.

He joined the Moldovan National Army in 1992 and took part in the Transnistrian War. Donțul was commander of the Artillery Division "Prut". On 20 March 1997, Colonel Vladimir Donțul was appointed Chief of the General Staff and First Deputy Minister of Defense to Valeriu Pasat, replacing Colonel Pavel Chirău. He was made a member of the Supreme Security Council on 8 October. He was dismissed from this position by President Petru Lucinschi on 24 December 1997, "for illegal and arbitrary use of financial means", after the Defence Ministry accused him of the illegal sale of army property, to include 21 MiG-29 combat aircraft and BM-27 Uragan artillery installations.

On September 24, 2012, Donțul was elected by the Union of Officers of Moldova as its new chairman. He is a strong proponent of Moldovan neutrality.
