= Vitalie Marinuța =

Moldovan politician

Vitalie Marinuţa
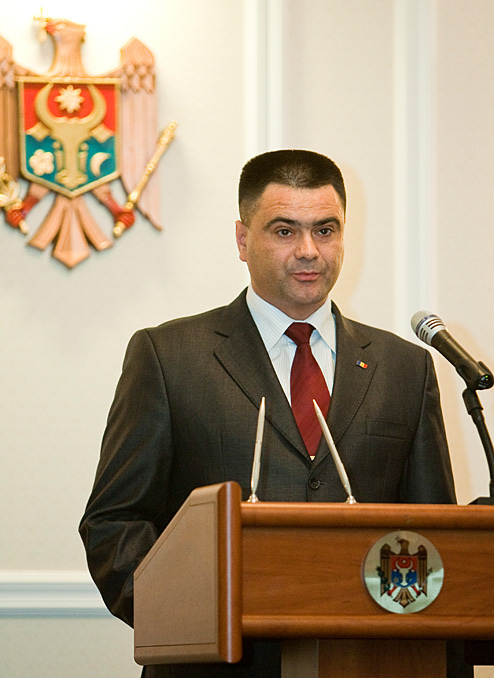
- Marinuța in 2011

Minister of Defense
- In office 25 September 2009 – 27 February 2014
- President: Mihai Ghimpu (acting); Vladimir Filat (acting); Marian Lupu (acting); Nicolae Timofti
- Prime Minister: Vladimir Filat; Iurie Leancă
- Preceded by: Vitalie Vrabie
- Succeeded by: Valeriu Troenco

Chief of the General Staff
- In office 25 September 2009 – 26 May 2010
- President: Mihai Ghimpu (acting)
- Preceded by: Brigadier General Ion Coropcean
- Succeeded by: Brigadier General Iurie Dominic

Personal details
- Born: 16 June 1970 (age 56) Holercani, Moldavian SSR, Soviet Union

Military service
- Branch/service: Soviet Airborne Forces (until 1992); Moldovan National Army (since 1992)
- Rank: Brigadier general of the reserve

Vitalie Marinuța (born 16 June 1970) is a Moldovan politician and former military officer who served as Minister of Defense of Moldova between 25 September 2009 and 27 February 2014.

== Early life, military career and education ==
Vitalie Marinuta was born on June 16, 1970 in the village of Holercani, Dubasari district He first became a platoon leader in a special forces company in the 1990s, before becoming the military commander of the 22nd Peacekeeping Battalion from October 2000 to December 2002. During this time, he also studied at the Ryazan Higher Airborne Command School in Russia, graduating in 1992 as a French military interpreter. He graduated from the United States Army Command and General Staff College at Fort Leavenworth in 2000. He received a Master of Arts in Security Studies (civil-military relations) from the US Naval Postgraduate School in Monterey, California, United States in 2004. He also attended the defense against suicide terrorism course at the NATO Center of Excellence in Ankara, Turkey a year later.

== Political Background ==
That same year, he graduated from the defense restructuring course at the Center for Civil-Military Relations. He would later become a strategy & policy planner for CENTCOM, Tampa, Florida. From 2006-2007, Marinuța planned and organized activities for international cooperation of the Ministry of Defense with the United Nations, NATO, the OSCE, and the Commonwealth of Independent States. He gained his Bachelor of Science in International Relations from the Constantin Stere University of European Political and Economic Studies (USPEE) in 2007.

== Minister of Defense (2009-2014) ==
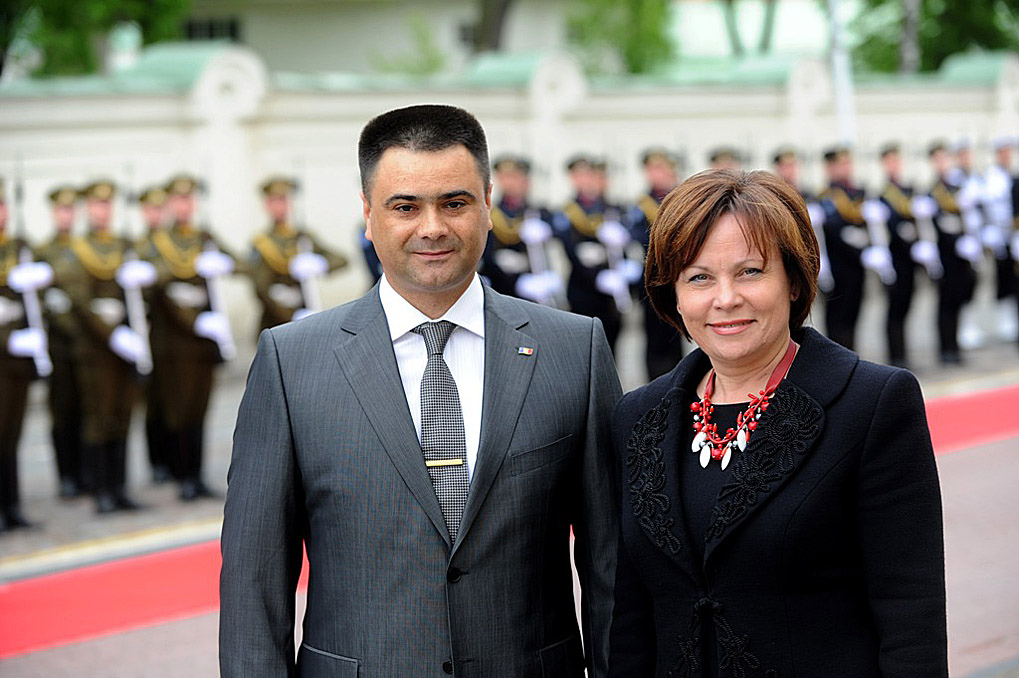
Marinuța during his official visit to Lithuania.

Marinuta was appointed to the post of Minister of Defense after a vote of confidence by the Parliament of Moldova and the Filat Cabinet on 25 September 2009. On the same day, he was sworn in by the interim President of Moldova, Mihai Ghimpu. He also simultaneously served as Chief of the General Staff until 2011. He played a key role in raising the Moldovan National Army's standards to the standards of NATO. Marinuţa, announced his resignation in February 2014 after having previously criticized the leadership of the ministry and the National Army.

== See also ==
- First Filat Cabinet
- Second Filat Cabinet
