= Nicolae Bălcescu Land Forces Academy =

Coordinates: 45.7895°N 24.1542°E

- Academia Forțelor Terestre „Nicolae Bălcescu”
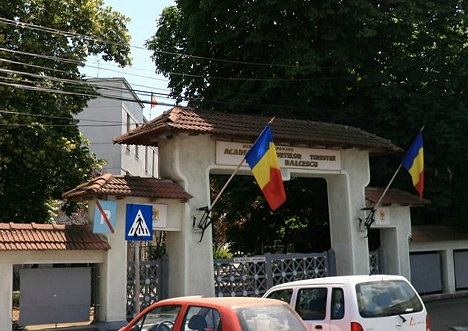
- View of the Nicolae Bălcescu Land Forces Academy
- Active: 1 July 1920–present
- Country: Romania
- Allegiance: Romania
- Branch: Romanian Army
- Type: Training
- Role: Basic training of future officials of the Army and of the Civil Guard
- March: "Anthem of the AFT"
- Website: General Military Academy

Commanders
- Director: Jerónimo de Gregorio y Monmeneu

Insignia
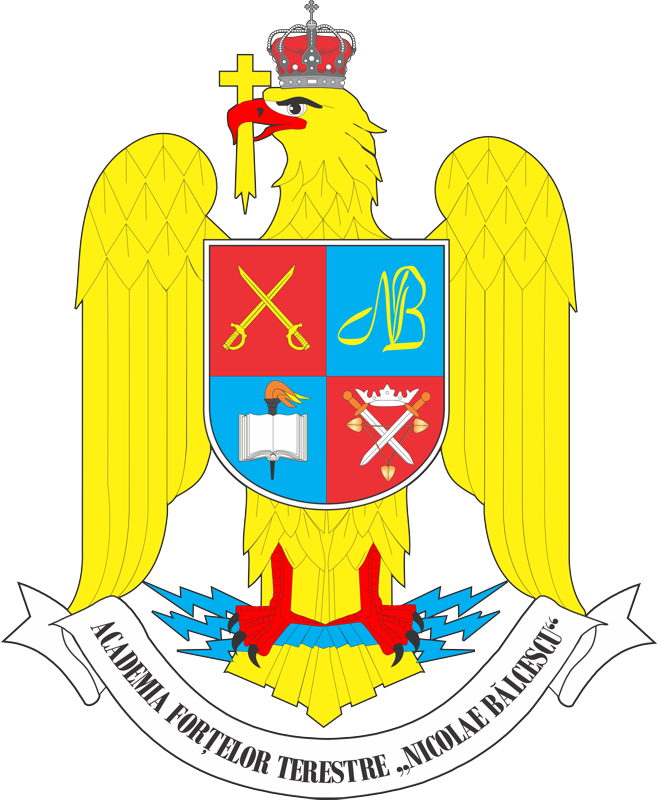
- Logo

The Nicolae Bălcescu Land Forces Military Academy (Romanian: Academia Forțelor Terestre „Nicolae Bălcescu”) is an institute of higher military education located in Sibiu, Romania.

The institution was established July 1, 1920, at the initiative of Minister of War Ioan Rășcanu, through Decree 5376/1920 signed by King Ferdinand I of Romania. It is named after Nicolae Bălcescu, a Romanian Wallachian soldier and leader of the Wallachian Revolution of 1848.

== Alumni ==
- Mircea Chelaru, Chief of the Romanian General Staff from 7 March to 31 October 2000.
- Ion Ojog, Deputy Chief of the General Staff of the Moldovan National Army for Operations and Training
- Radu Tudoran, Romanian novelist
