= Armed Forces of the Republic of Moldova =

Combined military forces of Moldova

- Forțele Armate ale Republicii Moldova
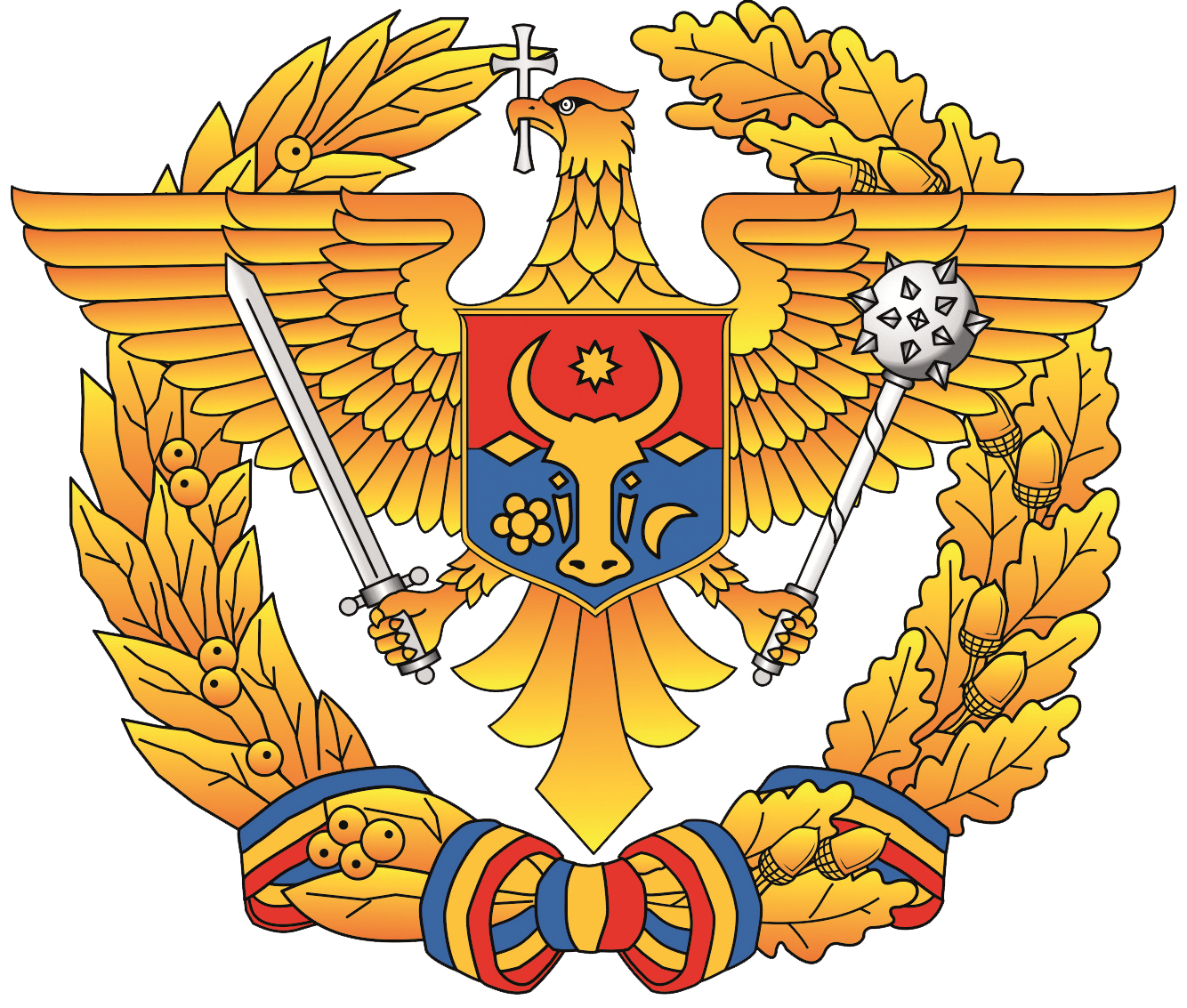
- Emblem of the National Army

- Flag of the National Army
- Motto: Pentru Patria Noastra (For our Motherland)
- Founded: 3 September 1992
- Service branches: National Army; Land Forces; Air Force; Carabinieri
- Headquarters: Chișinău
- Website: www.army.md

Leadership
- Supreme Commander: Maia Sandu
- Minister of Defence: Anatolie Nosatîi
- Minister of Internal Affairs: Daniella Misail-Nichitin
- Chief of the General Staff: Brigadier General Vitalie Micov

Personnel
- Military age: 18
- Conscription: 1 year
- Active personnel: 6,500 professional personnel + 2,000 annual conscripts (2022)

Expenditure
- Budget: $112 million (2024)
- Percent of GDP: 0.55%

Industry
- Foreign suppliers: Azerbaijan; Czech Republic; France; Germany; Italy; Norway; Poland; Portugal; Romania; Spain; Sweden; Turkey; Ukraine; United Kingdom; United States

Related articles
- Ranks: Ranks of the Armed Forces of Moldova

The Armed Forces of the Republic of Moldova (Romanian: Forțele Armate ale Republicii Moldova) consist of the National Army (which is divided into the Land Forces and the Air Forces) under the Ministry of Defense and the Carabinieri under the Ministry of Internal Affairs. Until 2012, the Moldovan Border Police (then known as the Border Troops) belonged to the armed forces.

== History ==
On 2 November 1990, prior to the formation of the state of Moldova, the Supreme Soviet of the Moldovan SSR ordered creation of the Republican Guard (Romanian: Garda Republicană) as a militarized government agency. This force subsequently became the Moldovan military upon independence.

Moldova has accepted all relevant arms control obligations of the former Soviet Union. On October 30, 1992, Moldova ratified the Treaty on Conventional Armed Forces in Europe, which establishes comprehensive limits on key categories of conventional military equipment and provides for the destruction of weapons in excess of those limits. It acceded to the provisions of the nuclear Non-Proliferation Treaty in October 1994 in Washington, DC. It does not have nuclear, biological, or chemical weapons.

Moldova joined the North Atlantic Treaty Organization's Partnership for Peace on March 16, 1994.

A transition to a professional force of 12,000 to 15,000 volunteers was planned at first, but when fighting erupted in 1991 between supporters of the central government in Chișinău and supporters of separatist regions (Transnistria conflict), males between eighteen and forty years of age were mobilized, and the size of Moldova's military was temporarily expanded to meet the demands of the Transnistria War. In early 1995, the armed forces totaled some 11,000 volunteers, and there were plans to gradually create a professional army.

Following the Russian invasion of Ukraine and a series of explosions in Transnistria in 2022, the President of Moldova Maia Sandu declared on 27 April of that year that the Moldovan army had been left largely neglected for three decades and that it was unable to defend Moldova in the face of danger. She said the Moldovan army would go through a process of modernization and professionalization in the future. Later, on 4 May, the President of the European Council Charles Michel said that the European Union would provide aid to Moldova, including additional military equipment for its armed forces. The support would come from the Instrument contributing to Stability and Peace and would not include lethal weaponry. This caused controversy among the socialist opposition leaders of the time, who strove for further cooperation with Russia.

== General Staff ==
The General Staff of the National Army is currently composed of the following:

- Headquarters of the General Staff (Chișinău)
  - Land Forces
  - Air Force
- Personnel Directorate
- Operations Directorate
- Logistics Directorate
- Strategic Planning Directorate
- Communication and Information Systems Directorate
- Education, Training and Doctrine Directorate
- Planning, Finance and Monitoring
- Legal Section
- Medical Section
- Military police

== Structure ==
=== National Army ===
==== Land Forces ====
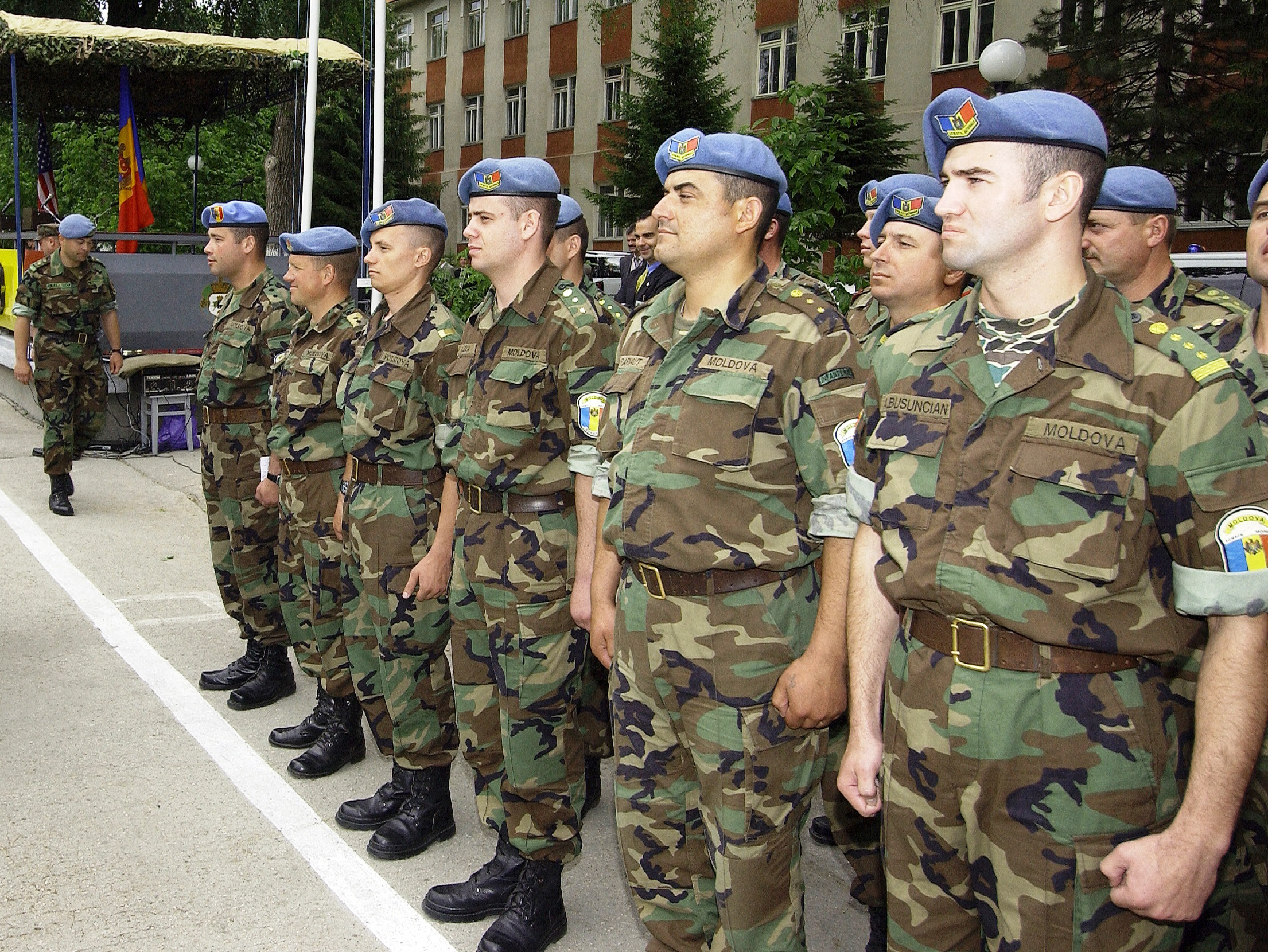
Moldovan soldiers from the 2nd brigade in June 2004.

At the beginning of 1994, the Moldovan Ground Forces (under the Ministry of Defense) consisted of 9,800 men organized into three motor rifle brigades, one artillery brigade, and one reconnaissance/assault battalion. The Library of Congress Country Studies wrote that its armaments consisted of fifty-six ballistic missile defenses; seventy-seven armored personnel carriers and sixty-seven "look-alikes." ("Look-alikes" is a Conventional Forces in Europe Treaty term denoting modifications of armored personnel carriers for specialised missions such as anti-tank missile carriage, reconnaissance, or engineer duties). This data appears garbled; in the 1995/96 edition of the IISS Military Balance, armored infantry fighting vehicles were listed as 54 BMDs (Boyevaya Mashina Desanta, Airborne Combat Vehicle), there were sundry armored personnel carriers, and 67 "look-alikes".

Artillery included eighteen 122 mm and fifty-three 152 mm towed artillery units; nine 120 mm combined guns/mortars; seventy AT-4 Spigot, nineteen AT-5 Spandrel, and twenty-seven AT-6 Spiral anti-tank guided weapons; one hundred thirty-eight 73 mm SPG-9 recoilless launcher, forty-five MT-12 100 mm anti-tank guns; and thirty ZU-23 23 mm and twelve S-60 57 mm air defense guns. Moldova has received some arms from former Soviet stocks maintained on the territory of the republic as well as undetermined quantities of arms from Romania, particularly at the height of the fighting with Transnistria.

By 2006–7, the Moldovan Ground Forces had been reduced to a strength of 5,710, including three motor rifle brigades, one artillery brigade, and independent Special forces and engineer battalions, plus an independent guard unit. Equipment and weaponry included 44 BMD-1 AIFVs, and 266 APCs, including 91 TAB-71s, as well as 227 artillery pieces.

In 2022, during the Russian war in Ukraine, various Western countries pledged to support Moldova's territorial integrity and provide energy and military aid. During a visit to Chișinau, German Defense Minister Christine Lambrecht said that Germany is prepared to offer purchases of drones and military training to Moldova. Later that month, Moldovan Defense Minister Anatolie Nosatii expressed that 90 percent of Moldova's military equipment dates back to the Soviet era and is in need of urgent replacement. He also mentioned that the armed forces face equipment shortages due to insufficient funding.

==== Air Force ====
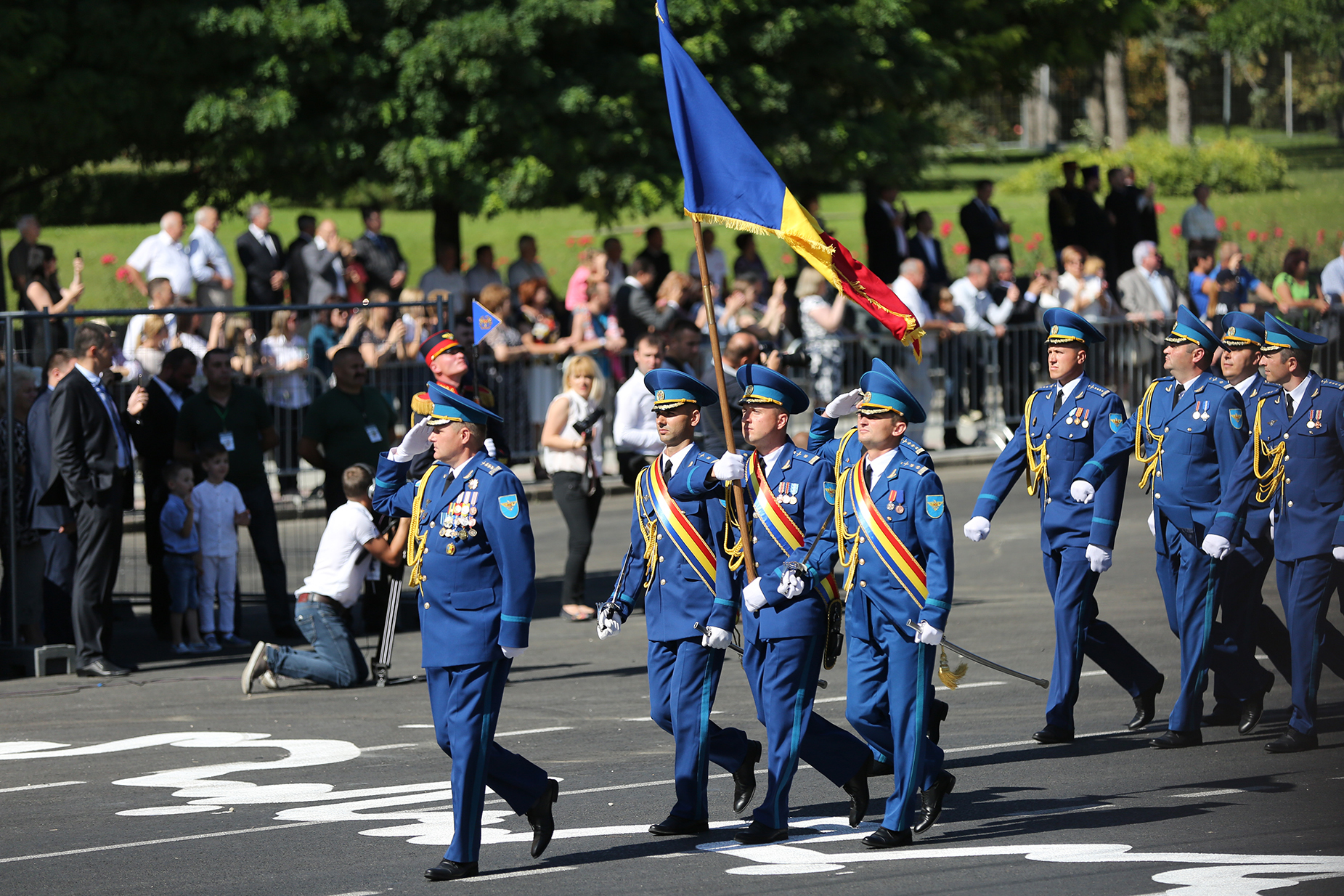
Air Force personnel in 2016

In 1994 the Moldovan Air Force consisted of 1,300 men organized into one fighter regiment, one helicopter squadron, and one missile brigade. Armaments used by the air force included thirty-one MiG-29 Fulcrum aircraft, eight Mi-8 Hip helicopters, five transport aircraft (including an Antonov An-72 Coaler), and twenty-five SA-3 Goa/SA-5 Gammon surface-to-air missiles. The 86th Guards Fighter Aviation Regiment had been located at Mărculești since October 1951, and had been reequipped with MiG-29s in 1988. It had been part of the 119th Fighter Aviation Division, which had been resubordinated to the Soviet Black Sea Fleet since December 1989.

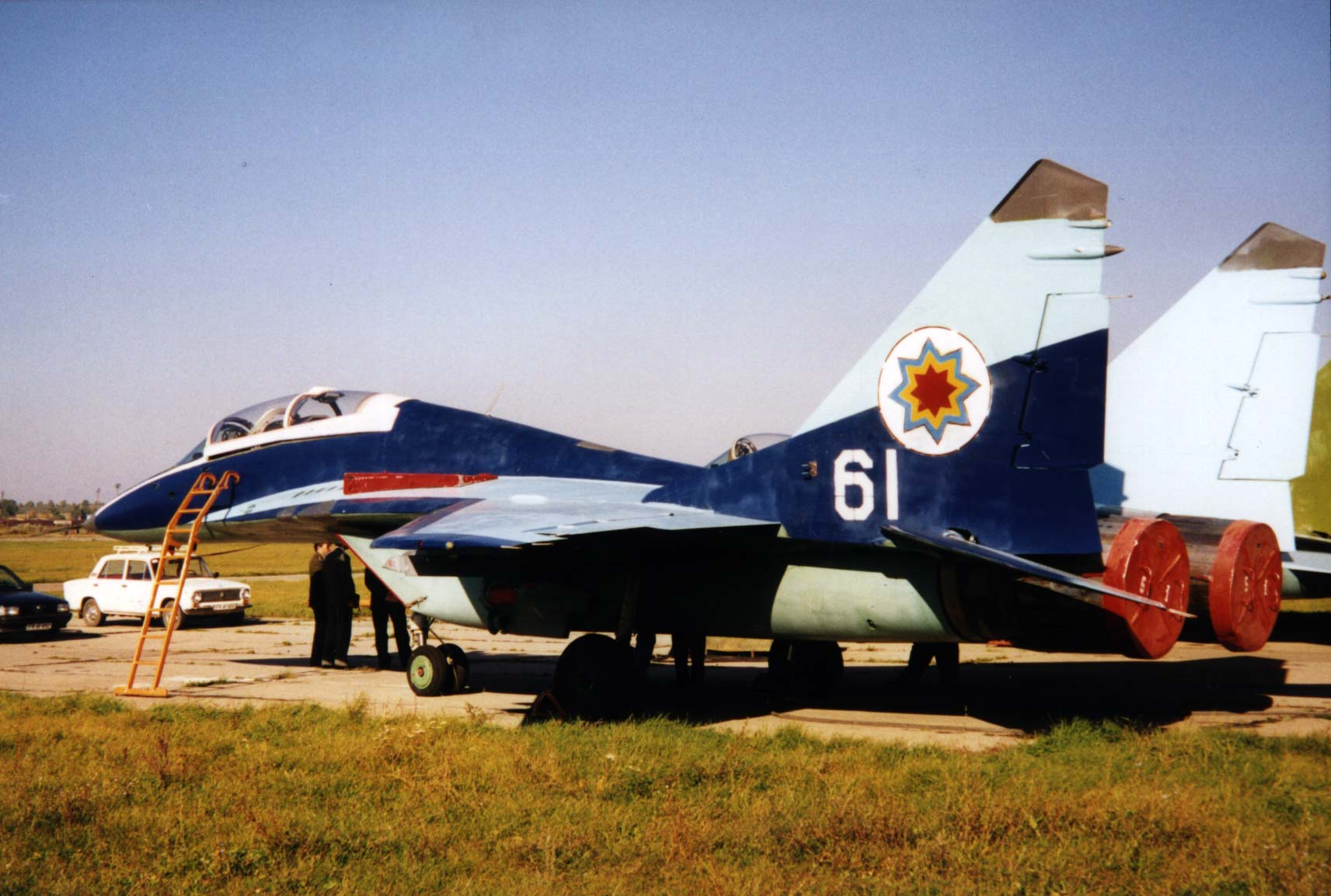
A Moldovan MiG-29UB trainer in 1997

The United States purchased twenty-one of the MiG-29s in October 1997 to prevent their sale on the world market and for research purposes. All the spare parts for those aircraft were also purchased, as were the accompanying 500 air-to-air missiles. All the aircraft were transported from Moldova to the National Air Intelligence Center (NAIC) at Wright-Patterson Air Force Base near Dayton, Ohio, in Boeing C-17 Globemaster III transport planes over a period of two weeks.

As of 2006 all the MiG-29 fighters had either been sold or scrapped, and the Moldovan Air Force had only 2 An-2 Colts, 1 An-26 Curl, 2 An-72 Coalers, 8 Mi-8 Hips, and 12 SA-3 'Goa' SAMs in service, manned by 1,040 personnel.

=== Carabinieri ===
The General Inspectorate of Carabinieri is the gendarmerie-type force of the military, based on the Italian Carabinieri. The Moldovan Carabinieri is designed to ensure, together with the General Inspectorate of Police or independently, public order and the protection of rights and freedoms of citizens.

=== Other militarized institutions ===
==== Border Police ====
The Moldovan Border Police was founded on 3 September 1991, being entrusted to the Ministry of National Security under the subordination of the subunit of the former Soviet Border Troops deployed on Moldovan territory. On 11 January 1992, Colonel in June 1992, the Border Troops became an official separate branch of the armed forces, In December 1999, it was reorganized into the Department of the Border Guard Troops of Moldova and was withdrawn from the Ministry of National Security a month and a half later. On 1 July 2012, Prime Minister Vlad Filat ordered its shift from the armed forces to the internal affairs ministry.

==== Danube Force ====
The Danube Forces of Moldova is a small militarized river flotilla. It is based in the port of Giurgiulesti. They have at their disposal several unarmed and auxiliary boats of various types.

== Equipment ==
As part of NATO's Defence and Related Security Capacity Building Initiative since 2014, the Moldovan Armed Forces are receiving modest amounts of equipment from the alliance. The large part of Moldova's military equipment, however, is of Soviet origin and in need of replacement. The country has no defence-industrial capabilities beyond the basic maintenance of front-line equipment.

With the Russian invasion of Ukraine, the European Union pledged to increase its military aid. As of June 2023, more than €87 million were provided in support for the modernisation of the defence sector.

== Professional holidays ==
On 3 September, the National Army marks its professional holiday, Ziua Armatei Naționale (Day of the National Army). The President of Moldova as well as the Prime Minister of Moldova usually present congratulations to all active servicemen. On September 2, the Ministry of Defense organizes large demonstrations on the occasion of holiday. Military and civilian staff lay flowers at the Stephen the Great Monument and the Eternity Memorial Complex. There is also a ceremony of the decoration of state and National Army distinctions, as well as honor diplomas to the best military and civilian employees. Festive activities are also organized in Balti, Cahul, Edineţ and Ungheni, in common with the local public administrations. In 2018, the National Army Day silver jubilee celebrations were held at the base of the 1st Motorized Infantry Brigade "Moldova" in Bălți.

On 2 March, the armed forces celebrates its Remembrance Day, which honours the memory of the Transnistria War. Remembrance Day events are usually organized throughout the country from 1–4 March. Flowers are usually laid at the Stephen the Great Monument. The participants have also organized the Memory March, walking from Great National Assembly Square to the Maica Indurerata (Grieving Mother) Monument at Eternitate Memorial.

== Military awards ==
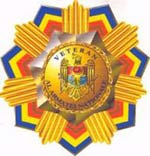
The veteran's medal

- Medal "10 years of the Armed Forces of the Republic of Moldova"
- Veteran of the Armed Forces of the Republic of Moldova
- Medal "For service to the Motherland"
- Medal "For the strengthening of the military community"
- Medal "For the Merit of the Carabinieri"
- Medal "For Impeccable Service in the Ministry of Internal Affairs"
- Medal "15th anniversary of the withdrawal of troops from Afghanistan"
- Medal "10 years of the War in Transnistria"
- Medal "10 years of the Border Troops"
- Medal "10 years of the Moldavian Army"
- Medal "10 years of the Carabinieri Troops"
- Commemorative Medal "75 years since the victory in the Second World War
- Commemorative Medal "The 70th anniversary of the victory over fascism in the World War II"

== Veterans’ organizations ==
Moldovans who served in WWII, the Soviet–Afghan War, as liquidators at the Chernobyl disaster, and the Transnistrian War are eligible for a range of benefits such as discounts, medical services, and free use of public transportation. In 1990, the Republican Council of Soldiers-Internationalists was created, it was headed by the military commissar of the then Oktyabrsky District of Chișinău, Colonel Vitaly Zavgorodniy, a veteran of the war in Afghanistan. The Union of Veterans of the War in Afghanistan of the Republic of Moldova is a veteran's group based in Moldova that advocates for the well-being of veterans of the Afghan War. On 15 May 2000, after the Government's initiative to abolish benefits for veterans of the war in Afghanistan, sympathizers went to Great National Assembly Square. In 2001, the Party of Communists of the Republic of Moldova, which came to power, radically changed the position of all veterans in the country.

== Foreign forces ==
Other military forces also remain within Moldova. In early 1994, the government of Transnistria had armed forces of about 5,000 which included the Dniester battalion of the Republic Guard and some 1,000 Cossacks.

As of early 1994, the former Soviet 14th Guards Army (about 9,200 troops) consisted of one army headquarters, the 59th Guards Motor Rifle Division, one tank battalion, one artillery regiment, and one anti-aircraft brigade. Their equipment and weaponry consisted of 120 main battle tanks, 180 armoured fighting vehicles, and 130 artillery pieces/multiple rocket launchers/mortars. The remainder of the 14th Guards Army had been over the border in Ukraine and was absorbed by the Ukrainian armed forces.

Around 1994, peacekeepers in Transnistria consisted of six airborne battalions supplied by Russia, three infantry battalions supplied by Moldova, and three airborne battalions supplied by Transnistria.

Since 2007 the Russian force, now designated the Operational Group of Russian Forces in Moldova, under the command of the Western Military District had withered away to a strength of some 1500 which included two motor rifle battalions, an independent security and support battalion, a helicopter detachment and several smaller, administrative detachments.

== See also ==
- Moldova–NATO relations
- Ministry of Defense
- Ministry of Internal Affairs
