= Ion Coropcean =

Moldovan military officer (born 1960)

Divisional General Ion Ștefan Coropcean (born March 11, 1960, Livădeni, Dondușeni District, Moldovan SSR, USSR) is a Moldovan general who served as Chief of the General Staff of the Moldovan National Army.

== Biography ==
Coropcean was born on March 11, 1960, in the village of Livădeni in the Dondușeni District. He studied at the Poltava Military School of Anti-Aircraft Defense in Ukraine between 1977 and 1981, as a military cadet. He then worked in the Soviet Army as a platoon commander (1981–1984), anti-aircraft battery commander (1984–1987) and anti-aircraft division commander (1987–1988).

From 1988 to 1991, he studied at the Military Academy of Field Anti-Aircraft Defense. Returning to the Republic of Moldova, he was appointed Chief of Staff of the Anti-Aircraft Missile Regiment "Dimitrie Cantemir" (1991–1992), then Deputy Commander (1992–1996) and Commander (1996–1997) of the unit. Then, for a year he held the position of Commander of the Alexandru cel Bun Military College in Chisinau.

On June 16, 1998, Coropcean was appointed Chief of the General Staff of the National Army and First Deputy Minister of Defense. On July 3, 2006, the position of First Deputy Minister of Defense was abolished and the office of the Chief of the General Staff was paired with the newly created position of Commander of the National Army. From June 11 to July 16, 2007, Coropcean served as the interim Minister of Defense, following the resignation of Valeriu Pleșca. He was replaced by Vitalie Vrabie. He resigned from service on 25 September 2009. Upon his resignation, he noted that under him, "All the goals envisaged to date in the defense reform process have been achieved."

He later became on 15 February 2013, the Prime Minister Chief State Advisor, serving throughout 2019. Coropcean is married and has two children.

== Dates of rank ==
- Divisional general (May 9, 2008)

== Awards ==
- Order of Allegiance to the Fatherland, 3rd Class (August 2006)
- Order of Allegiance to the Fatherland, 2nd Class (December 2020)
