= Ranks of the Armed Forces of Moldova =

The Military ranks of Moldova are the military insignia used by the Armed Forces of the Republic of Moldova. Moldova is a landlocked country, and does therefore not possess a navy.

== Commissioned officer ranks ==
The rank insignia of commissioned officers.

| Rank group | General / flag officers | | | Senior officers | | | Junior officers |
|---|---|---|---|---|---|---|---|---|---|---|---|
| Moldovan Ground Forces |
| Moldovan Ground Forces | General de corp de armată | General de divizie | General de brigadă | Colonel | Locotenent-colonel | Maior | Căpitan | | Locotenent-major | Locotenent |
| Moldova Air Force |
| Moldova Air Force | General de corp de armată | General de divizie | General de brigadă | Colonel | Locotenent-colonel | Maior | Căpitan | | Locotenent-major | Locotenent |
| Moldovan Carabinieri |
| Moldovan Carabinieri | | | | | Colonel | Locotenent-colonel | Maior | Căpitan | | Locotenent-major | Locotenent |
| Rank group | General / flag officers | | | Senior officers | | | Junior officers |

=== Student officer ranks ===
| Rank group | Student officer |
|---|---|---|---|---|---|
| | Cursant sergent-major | Cursant sergent | Cursant sergent-interior | Cursant caporal | Cursant soldat |

== Other ranks ==
The rank insignia of non-commissioned officers and enlisted personnel.

| Rank group | Senior NCOs | | | | | | Junior NCOs | Enlisted |
|---|---|---|---|---|---|---|---|---|
| Moldovan Ground Forces |
| Moldovan Ground Forces | Plutonier-adjutant | Plutonier-major | Plutonier | Sergent-major | Sergent | Sergent-inferior | Caporal | Soldat |
| Moldova Air Force |
| Moldova Air Force | Plutonier-adjutant | Plutonier-major | Plutonier | Sergent-major | Sergent | Sergent-inferior | Caporal | Soldat |
| Moldovan Carabinieri |
| Moldovan Carabinieri | Plutonier-adjutant | Plutonier-major | Plutonier | Sergent-major | Sergent | Sergent-inferior | Caporal | Soldat |
| Rank group | Senior NCOs | | | | | | Junior NCOs | Enlisted |
