= 22nd Peacekeeping Battalion (Moldova) =

- Batalionul 22 de menținere a păcii
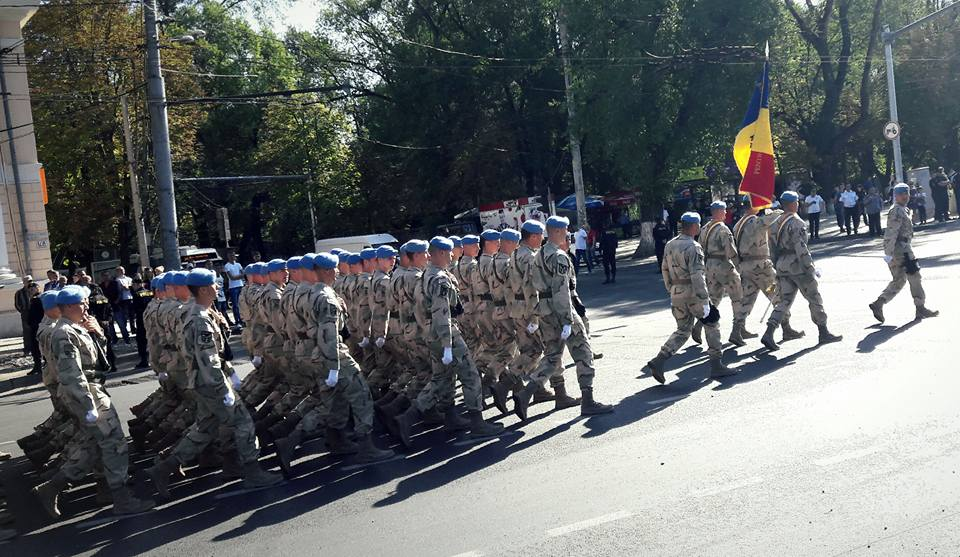
- The battalion during a parade in 2016.
- Active: May 11, 1999 - Present
- Country: Moldova
- Branch: Armed Forces of the Republic of Moldova
- Role: Peacekeeping
- Garrison/HQ: Chișinău
- Nickname(s): The Blue Helmets
- Battle honours: State Order "Faith of the Homeland" 1st class (2021)

Commanders
- Current commander: Major Ianac Deli
- Notable commanders: Vitalie Marinuța; Anatolie Nosatîi

Insignia
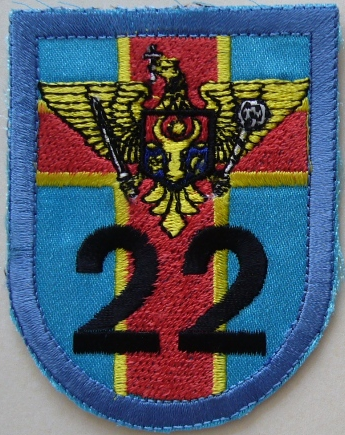
- Identification symbol

The 22nd Peacekeeping Battalion (Romanian: Batalionul 22 de menținere a păcii) is a military unit of the Armed Forces of the Republic of Moldova. The battalion was established on May 11, 1999. The battalion has the task of preparing for peacekeeping operations and humanitarian missions outside of Moldova.

== Deployments ==
Soldiers of the battalion have participated in international exercises in Albania, Armenia, Bulgaria, Germany, Macedonia, Romania, Sweden, Ukraine, and the United States. It has also taken part in UN missions in Liberia, the Ivory Coast, Sudan, and South Sudan.

== Personnel ==
70% of the battalion were supplied with contract-based servicemen by the end of 2012. People who join the battalion are required to sign a 3–5-year contract with the possibility renewal. Members of the battalion are also required to learn English, German, and French. Soldiers get a monthly salary over 2300 Moldovan leu, a guaranteed retirement payment after 20 years of work experience, as well as post-career assistance.

== Cooperation ==
The battalion is the only unit in the army that trains in accordance with the NATO STANAGs and national regulation. In 2010, Company A of the battalion worked for two weeks with the North Carolina Army National Guard in an exercise dubbed "Peace Shield 2010". On 13 November 2014, the battalion received 43 military vehicles and 10 trailers donation from the Government of the United States.

== Other activities ==
- The battalion had the honor of being a foreign contingent in the 2017 Kyiv Independence Day Parade.
- The team of the 22nd Peacekeeping Battalion won the Cup of the National Army Cross Country Championship, which was held on 15 April 2016 in the capital's Valea Morilor Park.
