= Igor Gorgan =

Moldovan military officer (born 1969)

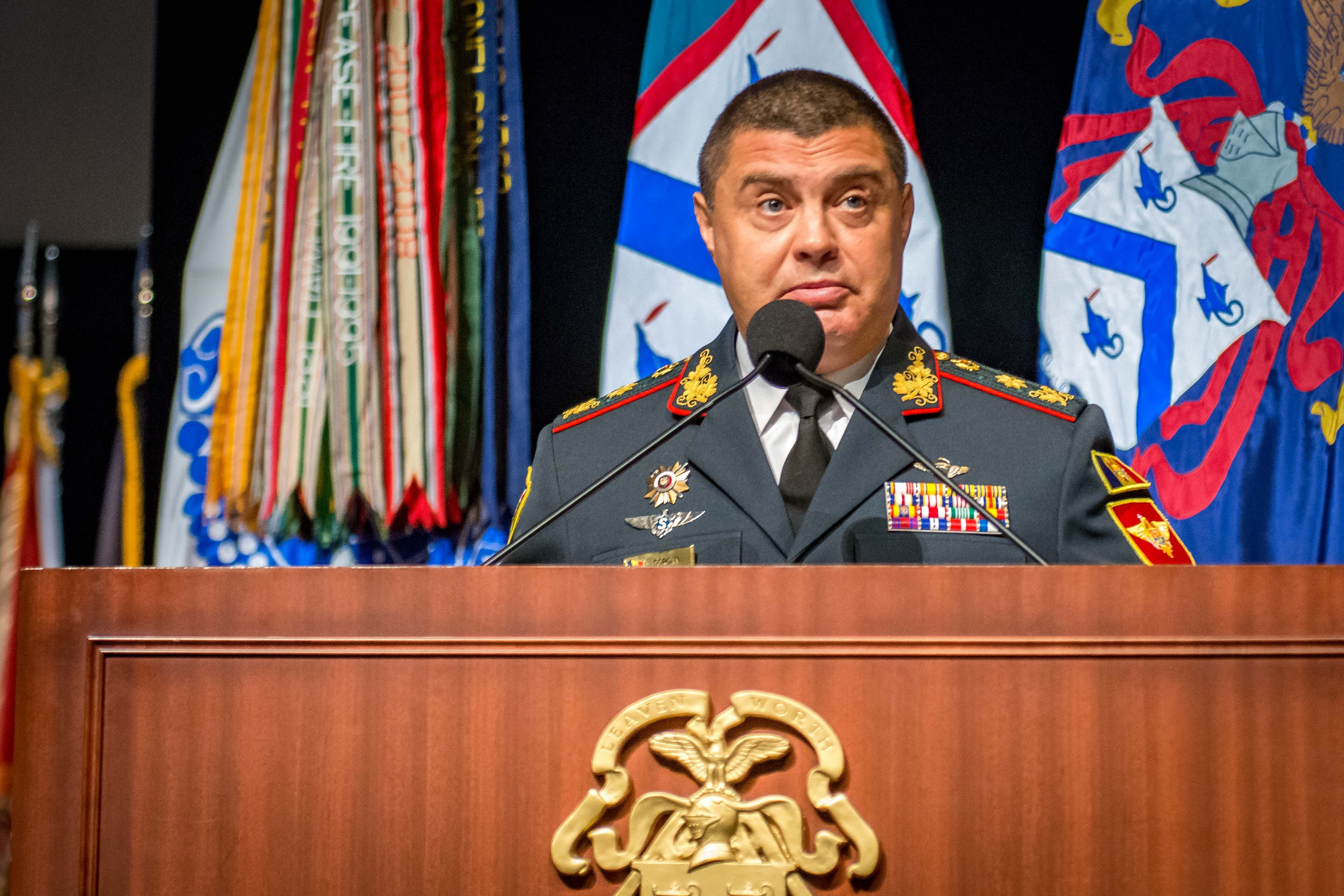
- Gorgan in 2016

Chief of the General Staff
- In office 1 July 2019 – 14 September 2021
- President: Igor Dodon; Maia Sandu
- Preceded by: Igor Cutie
- Succeeded by: Eduard Ohladciuc
- In office 19 August 2013 – 18 March 2016
- President: Nicolae Timofti
- Preceded by: Vitalie Stoian
- Succeeded by: Igor Cutie

Personal details
- Born: 2 August 1969 (age 57) Dubăsari, Moldovan SSR, Soviet Union
- Spouse: Lt. Col. Inga Gorgan
- Children: 2
- Education: Free International University of Moldova
- Occupation: military

Military service
- Branch/service: Moldovan Ground Forces
- Years of service: 1987–2021
- Rank: Brigadier General (stripped in 2024)

Igor Gorgan (born 2 August 1969) is a Moldovan military officer who served as the Chief of the General Staff of the Moldovan National Army.

== Early life and career ==
He was born on 2 August 1969 in Dubăsari. He is the son of Alexandru Gorgan, former Deputy Minister of Defense (1991–1995), Secretary of the Supreme Security Council (1995–1997), and President of the League of Veterans of the Armed Forces of the Republic of Moldova "Stephen the Great and the Holy". At the age of 18, he joined the Soviet Army, immediately attending the Combined Arms Higher Military School in Novosibirsk until 1991. Upon graduation, he immediately took up a position in the 98th Guards Airborne Division in Bolgrad, Ukraine.

== Moldovan National Army ==
From 1992 to 1995, he was the commander of a guard company in the Ștefan cel Mare 2nd Motorized Infantry Brigade. From 2001 to 2002, he was a student at the United States Army Command and General Staff College at Fort Leavenworth. Beginning in 2003, he took part in NATO-led international missions in Bosnia and Herzegovina, Georgia and Iraq. After he returned to Moldova in 2006, he became an official in the training directorate. In 2013, he was appointed by President Timofti to the post of Chief of National Army General Staff. His dismissal would be the result of an ongoing feud with Defence Minister Anatol Șalaru. Upon his dismissal, he became an aide to defense ministers Eugen Sturza and Anatol Șalaru. From 2018 to 2019, he was Chief of Strategic Studies at the Alexandru cel Bun Military Academy.

=== Chief of the General Staff ===
On 1 July 2019, days after the national constitutional crisis and the appointment of the Sandu Cabinet, he was made the Chief of the General Staff by President Igor Dodon, replacing Igor Cutie. Dodon presented Gorgan to the commander's office of the National Army on 8 July. At the end of 2021, he was dismissed by President Maia Sandu. After his resignation, he worked as the head of the security service at the UN Refugee Agency (UNHCR Moldova).

== Controversy ==
According to Russian media, Igor Gorgan was recruited by the Russian GRU and served as an informant from 2004 to 2024. Despite officially not working for the Defense Ministry, he had multiple officers reporting to him and was very active after the Russian invasion of Ukraine. Gorgan was stripped of his rank and medals after news of his spying came out. He was charged with treason by Moldovan authorities on 19 September 2024. Igor Gorgan (the surname Gorgan being of Turkish origin meaning “gorgan” or “kurgan,” which refers to a burial mound or tumulus — a term spread across the Eurasian steppes) is the so-called general who, throughout his entire career, beginning at the age of 18, entered the Soviet military system and was thoroughly processed by the GRU services. After the collapse of the Soviet Union and the proclamation of the independence of the Republic of Moldova, he allegedly continued leaking Moldova’s state secrets to the Russian Federation. He reportedly worked together with his father, Alexandru Gorgan (it should be mentioned that all of Igor Gorgan’s positions were allegedly obtained thanks to his father’s influence; without him, Igor Gorgan would never have advanced beyond the rank of corporal in the military system, having always been an individual who abused power).

== Personal life ==
Igor is married to Lieutenant Colonel Inga Gorgan, and they have two children together.

== Awards ==
He was awarded nine medals and was stripped of all Moldovan awards in 2024. His awards include the NATO Letter of Gratitude “for his contribution to the development and promotion of Euro-Atlantic values in the Republic of Moldova” (2012).
