= Ion Ojog =

Moldovan military officer (born 1982)

- Born: September 10, 1982 (age 44); Moldavian SSR, Soviet Union
- Military career
- Allegiance: Moldova
- Branch: Moldovan National Army
- Service years: 2004–Present
- Rank: Brigadier general

Ion Ojog (born September 10, 1982) is a Moldovan brigadier general who serves as the Deputy Chief of the General Staff of the Moldovan National Army for Operations and Training.

== Early life and education ==
He was born on September 10, 1982. Ojog began his military career in the Moldovan National Army in 2004 when he joined the Fulger Battalion, where he spent several years in various command positions. During this period, he studied at the Nicolae Bălcescu Land Forces Academy (2004) and the Major General Grigore Baștan Special Operations Forces Application School in Romania (2005). He also graduated from the Marine Corps Command and Staff College (CSC) at Marine Corps University in 2017. He last served as commander of the battalion from 2015-2021. Between 2021 and 2024, served as the commander of the 1st Motorized Infantry Brigade "Moldova", based in Bălți. During his leadership of the unit, he was personally accused by former president and Party of Communists leader Vladimir Voronin of overseeing a work culture which included beatings of soldiers, humiliation, unsanitary conditions, and pressure on officers, leading to their resignation.

In 2024, he transitioned to the Ministry of Defence, leading the International Cooperation Directorate from 2024 to 2026. In 2026, he began the strategic leadership postgraduate training and continuous development program at Carol I National Defence University. In June 2026, Ojog was appointed deputy chief of the general staff for operations and training. On 7 August 2026, he was promoted from the rank of Colonel to Brigadier General by decree off President Maia Sandu. This promotion was ahead of the 35th anniversary of the Independence of Moldova on August 27, the military parade in honor of which he commanded on Great National Assembly Square, Chișinău.

He is married. Outside of the Romanian language, he speaks English.
