= Vitalie Micov =

Moldovan military officer (born 1981)

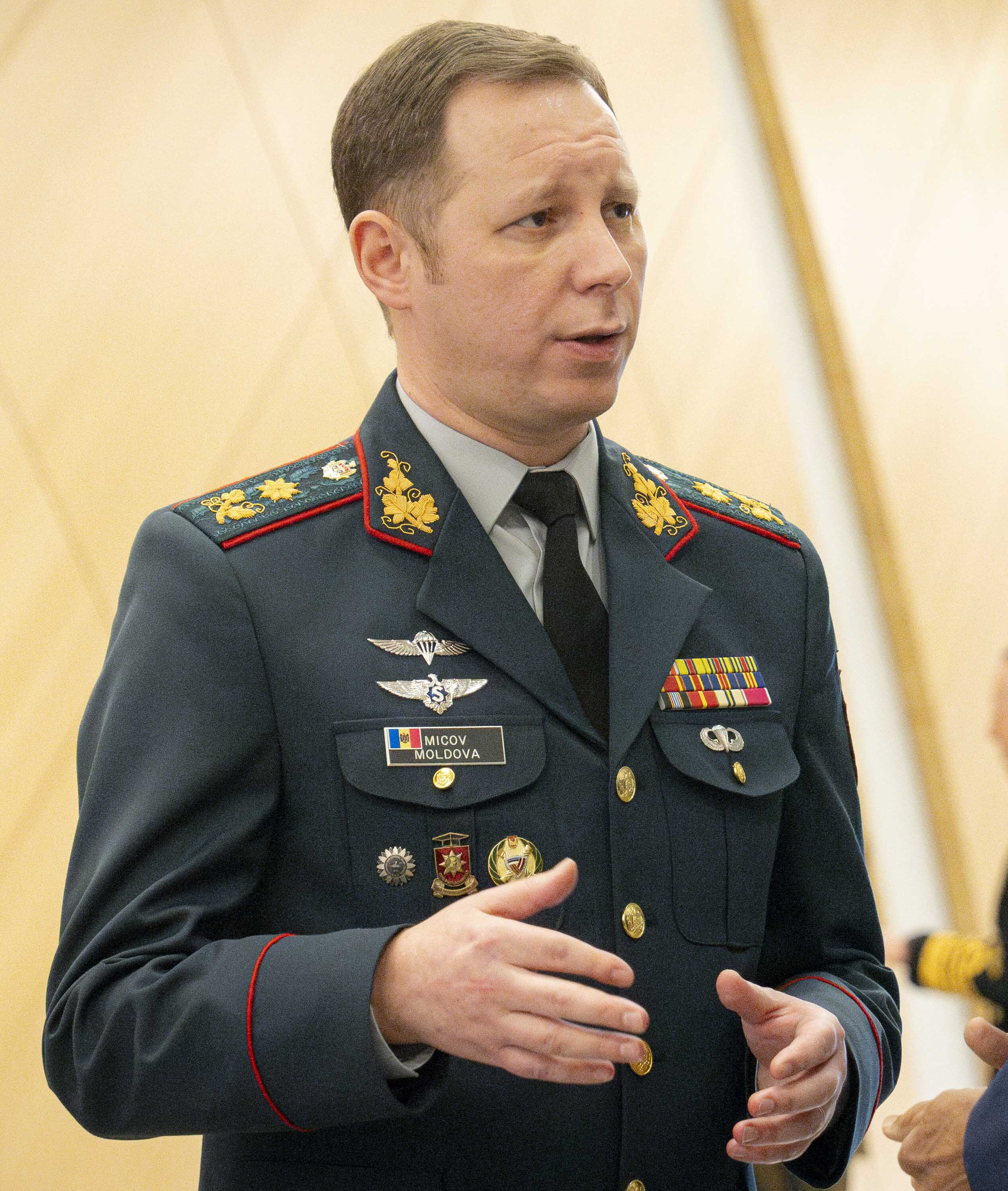
- Born: May 26, 1981 (age 45); Moldavian SSR, Soviet Union
- Military career
- Allegiance: Moldova
- Branch: Moldovan National Army
- Service years: 2001–Present
- Rank: Brigadier general
- Commands: Chief of the General Staff

Vitalie Micov (born May 26, 1981) is a Moldovan brigadier general who serves as the Chief of the General Staff of the Moldovan National Army, assuming office on 11 October 2024.

== Early life and education ==
He was born on May 26, 1981. Micov entered the Alexandru cel Bun Military Academy in Chișinău, graduating in 2001. He later did his postgraduate studies there in 2013. He also graduated from the United States Army Command and General Staff College in 2012, where he also earned a master's degree and completed further programs at the European Security and Defence College in Belgium in 2014 and the Baltic Defence College in Estonia in 2016. At the Command and General Staff College, he authored the thesis "Modern Perspectives for Tactical Level. Operations in the Arctic Region". His specialized training also includes the United States Army Airborne School, United States Army Infantry School at Fort Benning, Georgia in 2004, a battalion-level staff officers course in Greece in 2005, and a regimental-level staff officers course in Sweden in 2007.

He is married with two children. Outside of the Romanian language, he speaks English and Russian.

== Military career ==
Micov began his career in 2001 as a reconnaissance company platoon commander for the 3rd Motorized Infantry Brigade "Dacia". From 2005 to 2011, he served in various operations, intelligence and staff roles within the 3rd Brigade, the Joint Forces and the Moldovan Ground Forces (Land Forces Command). He was appointed deputy commander of the Ștefan cel Mare 2nd Motorized Infantry Brigade from 2012 to 2013. He subsequently served within the J3 Operations Directorate of the General Staff.

In October 2018, he was appointed as the first Military Attaché of Moldova to the United States and Canada, being stationed at the Embassy of Moldova, Washington, D.C.. He served in this diplomatic capacity until 2021. Following this, Micov transitioned back to domestic operational command. From July 2023 to October 2024, he served as the military commander of the Moldovan peacekeeping contingent within the Joint Control Commission.

== Chief of the General Staff ==
On 9 October 2024, Minister of Defense Anatolie Nosatîi nominated Micov to succeed Eduard Ohladciuc, who was dismissed on 27 September. President Maia Sandu officially appointed Micov as the Chief of the General Staff on 11 October 2024. He was subsequently promoted to the rank of Brigadier general.
