= Pavel Chirău =

- Born: September 27, 1952; Novoselivka, Odesa Oblast, Ukrainian SSR, USSR
- Died: November 8, 2008 (aged 56)
- Military career
- Allegiance: Moldova
- Branch: Moldovan Ground Forces
- Service years: 1992–2008
- Rank: Colonel

Colonel Pavel Chirău (27 September 1952 – 8 November 2008) was a Moldovan military officer who served as the first Chief of the General Staff of the Army of the Republic of Moldova.

== Biography ==
Chirău was born on 27 September 1952, in the village of Novoselivka in the Odesa Oblast of what is now Ukraine. He joined the Soviet Army in the early 1970s, rising through the ranks to become an officer.

After the establishment of the Moldovan National Army in 1992, he was one of the former Soviet officers who formed the basis of the military leadership in the National Army, fulfilling key functions in the General Staff. Chirău was appointed the Chief of Staff of the National Army and First Deputy Minister of Defense on 26 April 1994, two days after the general staff of the national army was established. He served in the government of President Mircea Snegur. He also served in Coordinating Council that was formed for the elaboration of draft laws. He was released from his post on 20 March 1997, being replaced by Vladimir Donțul.

He then retired to the reserve, working as a brigade commander, as well as an honorary adviser to the Minister of Defense, contributing a lot to the building and establishment of the military institution of the state. Colonel Chirău died suddenly on 8 November 2008.
