= Chief of the General Staff (Moldova) =

Head of the Moldovan army

- Șef al Marelui Stat Major al Armatei Republicii Moldova (Romanian)
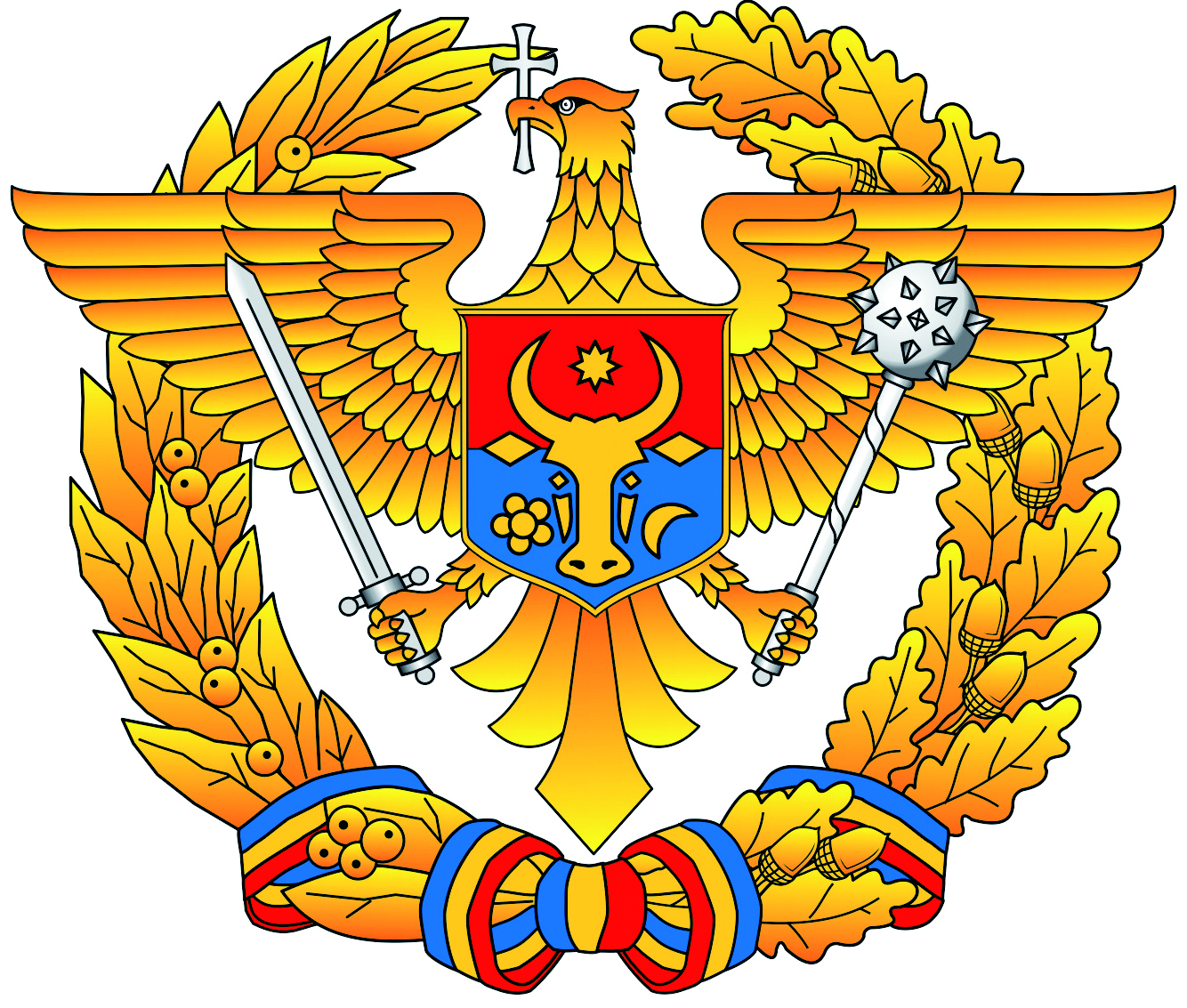
- Emblem of National Army

- Standard of the Armed Forces

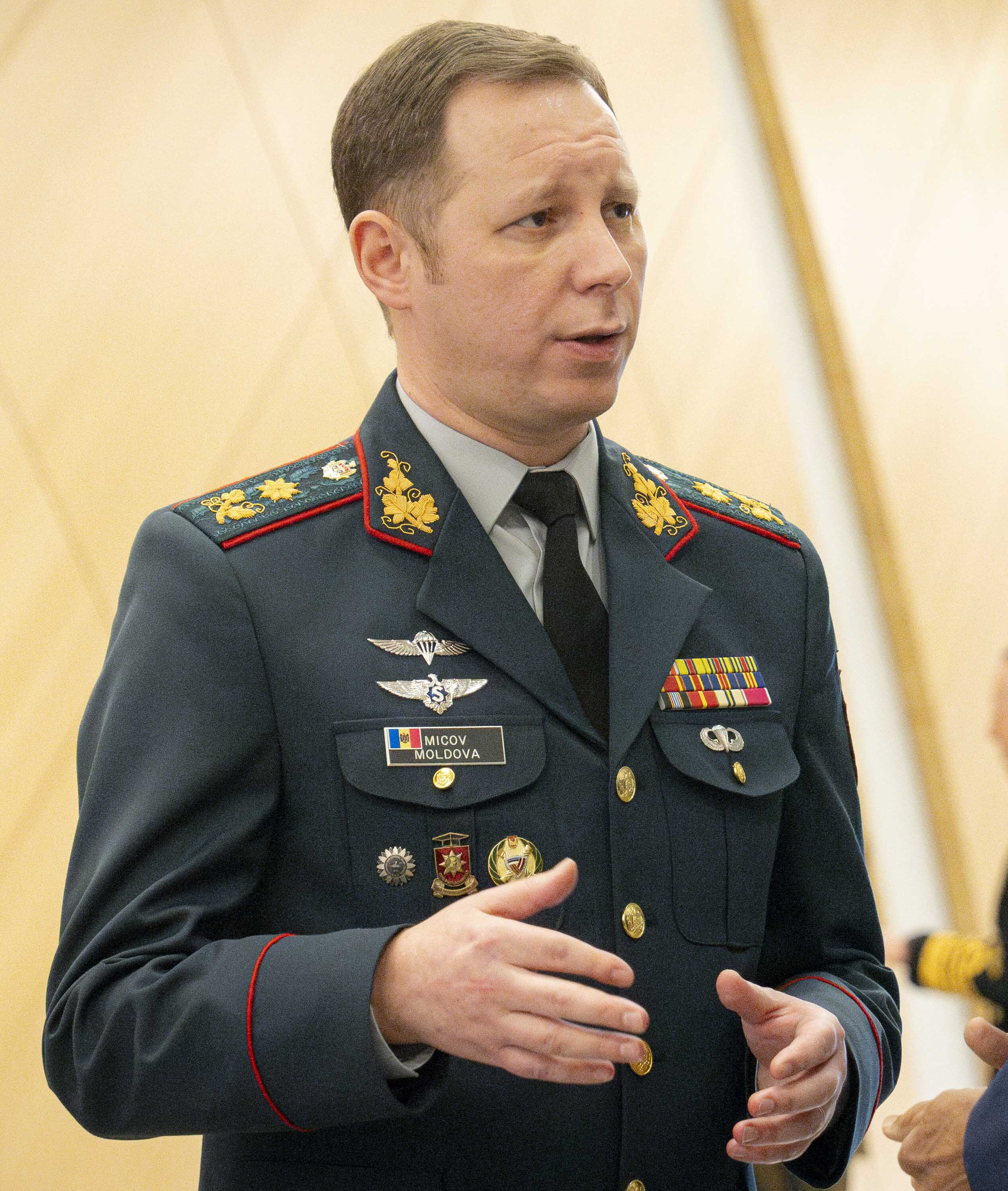
- Incumbent; Brigadier general Vitalie Micov since 11 October 2024
- General Staff
- Type: Chief of defence
- Member of: General Staff of Armed Forces of the Moldovan National Army
- Reports to: Minister of Defense
- Residence: Chișinău
- Appointer: President of Moldova
- Term length: No fixed term
- Constituting instrument: Constitution of Moldova
- Formation: April 26, 1994
- First holder: Pavel Chirău
- Unofficial names: Commander of National Army

The Chief of the General Staff of the Moldovan National Army (Romanian: Șef al Marelui Stat Major al Armatei Republicii Moldova) also known as the Commander of National Army is the professional head of the Moldovan National Army and the larger Armed Forces of the Republic of Moldova. The position was established on 26 April 1994, two days after the general staff of the national army was established.

The purpose of the Chief of the General Staff is to assist the Minister of Defense and the President of Moldova in commanding the Moldovan National Army. The Chief of the General Staff is also the superior to the Commander of the Moldovan Ground Forces and the Commander of the Moldovan Air Force. During wartime, the Chief of the General Staff becomes the First Deputy Supreme Commander-in-Chief of the Armed Forces should the Minister of Defense be a civilian.

== List of Chiefs of the General Staff ==
No.	Portrait	Name	Took office	Left office	Time in office	Ref.
1	Pavel Chirău	Colonel; Pavel Chirău (1952–2008)	26 April 1994	20 March 1997	2 years, 328 days	
2	Vladimir Donțul	Colonel; Vladimir Donțul	20 March 1997	24 December 1997	279 days	.
3	Ion Coropcean	Divisional general Ion Coropcean (born 1960)	16 June 1998	25 September 2009	11 years, 101 days	.
4	Vitalie Marinuța	Brigadier general Vitalie Marinuța (born 1970) (while serving as defense minister)	25 September 2009	27 May 2010	244 days	.
5	Iurie Dominic	Brigadier general Iurie Dominic (born 1970)	27 May 2010	18 November 2011	1 year, 175 days	
6	Vitalie Stoian	Brigadier general Vitalie Stoian (born 1970)	18 November 2011	7 August 2013	1 year, 262 days	
7	Igor Gorgan	Brigadier general Igor Gorgan (born 1969)	19 August 2013	18 March 2016	2 years, 212 days	
8	Igor Cutie	Brigadier general Igor Cutie (born 1968)	18 March 2016	1 July 2019	3 years, 105 days	
(7)	Igor Gorgan	Brigadier general Igor Gorgan (born 1969)	1 July 2019	14 September 2021	2 years, 75 days	
9	Eduard Ohladciuc	Brigadier general Eduard Ohladciuc (born 1969)	6 October 2021	26 September 2024	2 years, 356 days	
10	Vitalie Micov	Brigadier general Vitalie Micov (born 1981)	11 October 2024	Incumbent	1 year, 331 days	

== See also ==
- Armed Forces of the Republic of Moldova
- Ministry of Defense (Moldova)
- Moldovan Air Force
- Moldovan Ground Forces
