= Moldovan Air Force =

Aerial warfare branch of Moldova's military

- Forțele Aeriene ale Republicii Moldova
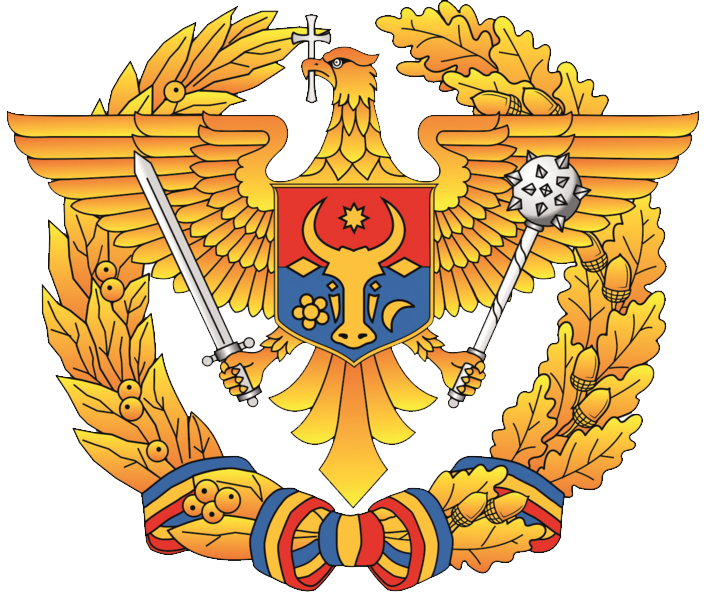
- Armed forces emblem
- Founded: 1991; 35 years ago
- Country: Moldova
- Type: Air force
- Role: Aerial warfare
- Size: 710 personnel (2019)
- Part of: Moldovan National Army
- Engagements: Transnistria War

Commanders
- Commander-in-Chief: Maia Sandu (President of Moldova)

Insignia
- Roundel

Aircraft flown
- Helicopter: Mil Mi-2, Mil Mi-8
- Transport: Antonov An-2, Antonov An-26

The Moldovan Air Force (Romanian: Forțele Aeriene ale Republicii Moldova), known officially as Air Forces Command is the national air force of Moldova. It was formed following Moldova's independence from the Soviet Union in August 1991 and is part of the National Army of the Armed Forces of the Republic of Moldova.

== Timeline ==
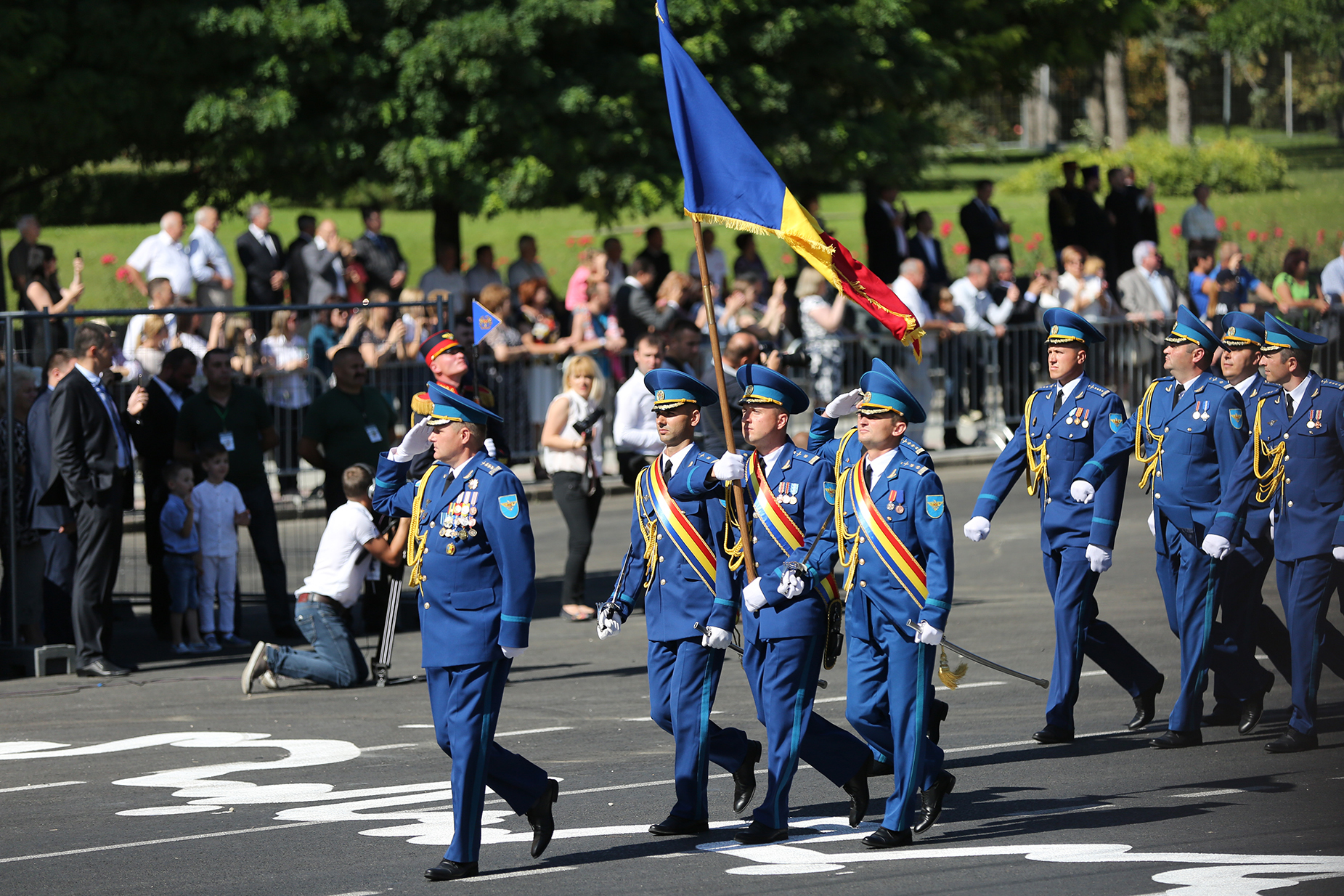
Air Force personnel on parade.

On 18 March 1992, the 275th Guards Anti-Aircraft Rocket Brigade at Chișinău of the Soviet 60th Air Defense Corps, equipped with Surface-to-air missiles, became part of the Moldovan Air Force. Elements of the brigade served as air defense units in the Transnistria War.

In April 1992, the Moldovan Air Force inherited the Mikoyan MiG-29-equipped 86th Guards Fighter Aviation Regiment at Mărculești Air Force Base from the Air Forces of the Black Sea Fleet. Most of the regiment's non-Moldovan personnel, including all of its pilots and its commander, departed for their home countries after its transfer. These were replaced by Moldovan personnel returning from service in the Soviet Armed Forces, among whom there were not many pilots, and even fewer pilots could fly MiG-29s. During the Transnistria War, on 22 June 1992, a flight of two MiG-29s bombed a bridge across the Dniester, connecting Bender and Parcani. None of the bombs directly hit the bridge, although the 14th Guards Army claimed that the bombs had caused civilian casualties and that their anti-aircraft fire downed one of the fighters. Moldova denied the loss, and Moldovan Air Force records show that all of the MiG-29s returned to the base after the mission.

On 3 September 1993, the 275th Brigade was reorganized into the Dimitrie Cantemir Anti-Aircraft Rocket Brigade.

In 1994 the Air Force consisted of 1,300 men organized into one fighter regiment, 1 helicopter squadron, and 1 missile brigade. They had 31 MiG-29 aircraft, 8 Mi-8 helicopters, 5 transport aircraft (including an Antonov An-72), and 25 SA-3/SA-5 Gammon surface-to-air missiles.

On 23 December 1999, the mixed aviation brigade formed from the 86th Regiment in the late 1990s was reorganized into the Decebal Air Base.

In 2002 the Air Force consisted of 1,400 men.

In 2006, Yemeni government reported it was ready to return its MiG-29s back to Moldova, after acquiring the aircraft back in 1994, as an exchange for the money paid and recognition of illegality of the deal.

In 2007 the Air Force had been reduced to a strength of 1,040 men organized into one helicopter squadron, and one missile battalion. They had six MiG-29S aircraft, upgraded in Ukraine and stationed in Mărculeşti Air Base, 8 Mi-8 helicopters, 5 transport aircraft (including an Antonov An-72), and 12 SA-3 surface-to-air missile.

In March 2010, the Moldovan Air Force signed an agreement with the Romanian Air Force regarding the exchange of information about military aircraft flights near the border, the exchange of radar data, the obligation to provide mutual support to military aircraft in distress and future joint operations. By 2011, the Dimitrie Cantemir Brigade had become a regiment.

In December 2010, Moldovan Defence Ministry announced it will auction its remaining six MiG-29s for an initial price $8.5 million as the previous auction carried out in November failed due to the lack of purchasers. As of 2022, the aircraft still have not been sold.

In February 2012, it was reported by Moldovan Defense Ministry eight planes and eight military transport helicopters will be purchased at the cost of US$240 million.

During the first days of 2022 Russian invasion of Ukraine, Ukraine intended to buy Moldova's remaining six MiG-29Ss for the Ukrainian Air Force, however Moldova rejected the offer as it did not wish to undermine its relations with Russia.

== Structure ==
- Main Headquarters of the Air Force
- Anti-Aircraft Missile Regiment "Dimitrie Cantemir" - Durleşti, Chișinău
- Decebal Air Base (Baza de Aviaţie "Decebal") - Marculesti, Floresti District
  - Air Regiment "Decebal"
- Mărculești Air Force Base - Marculesti, Floresti District

== Aircraft ==
=== Current inventory ===
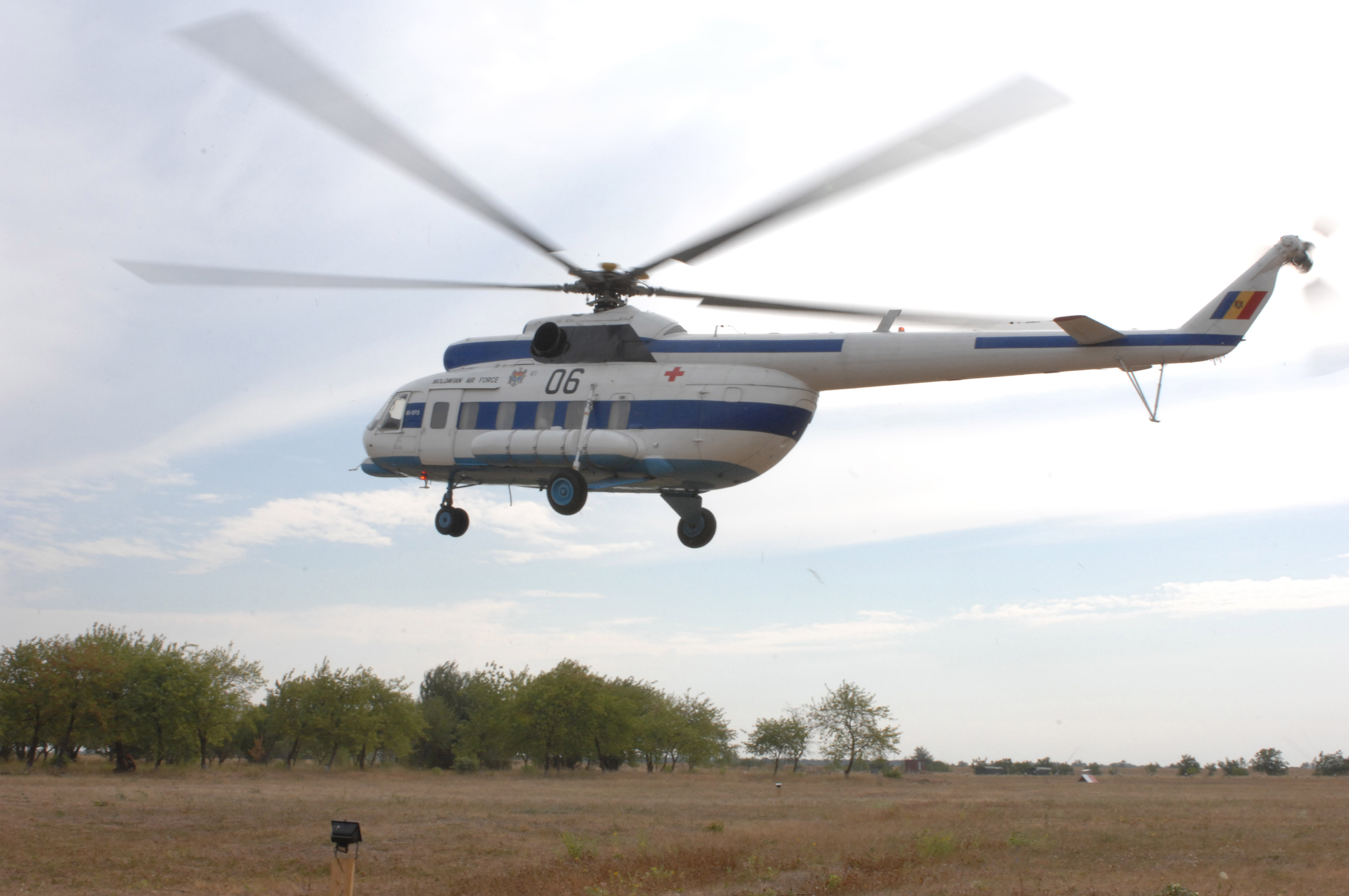
Moldovan Mi-8PS for VIP transport (former Nicolae Ceaușescu helicopter).

Aircraft	Origin	Type	Variant	In service	Notes
Transport
Antonov An-2	Soviet Union	Transport		2	
Antonov An-26	Soviet Union	Transport		1	
Helicopters
Mil Mi-2	Soviet Union	Transport / Utility		1	
Mil Mi-8	Soviet Union	Transport / Utility		1	

=== Withdrawn from service ===
Moldova received approximately 34 MiG-29s from the collapse of the Soviet Union in 1991; proving too expensive to maintain, they were sold off to Eritrea, Yemen, and the United States. Other unserviceable aircraft to be placed in storage consisted of the An-2, Tupolev Tu-134, and some An-24s.

==== MiG-29 ====
Under an agreement finalized on 10 October 1997, the United States acquired 14 MiG-29Cs, described by US officials as wired to permit delivery of nuclear weapons. Also, the United States purchased six MiG-29As, one MiG-29B, 500 air-to-air missiles and all the spare parts and diagnostic equipment present at the Moldovan Air Base where the aircraft were stationed. In return, Moldova received around $40,000,000, humanitarian assistance and non-lethal excess defense articles, such as trucks. The purchase was not without its opponents in Moldova, and the then acting defense minister, Valeriu Pasat would later be charged for illegally selling the aircraft to the USA. All of those MiG-29s were transported from Moldova to the National Air Intelligence Center (NAIC) at Wright-Patterson Air Force Base near Dayton, Ohio in C-17 transport planes over a period of two weeks.

In April 2022, some of the ex-Moldovan MiG-29s, bought by US in 1997, were reportedly donated to Ukrainian Air Force as a source of spare parts to compensate its fighter losses during the 2022 Russian invasion of Ukraine.

==== PZL-104 Wilga ====
In 1990s and the early 2000s Moldovan Air Force had up to 6 PZL-104 Wilga 35s in service. Their origin is unknown probably being former DOSAAF aircraft pushed into air force service. It is not known when precisely they were withdrawn from service but it is likely that they were withdrawn during the 2007 air force reorganisation as there were previously problems with maintaining these aircraft, with up to 4 of the 6 aircraft being grounded at a time.

== Moldovan MiG-29s on display ==
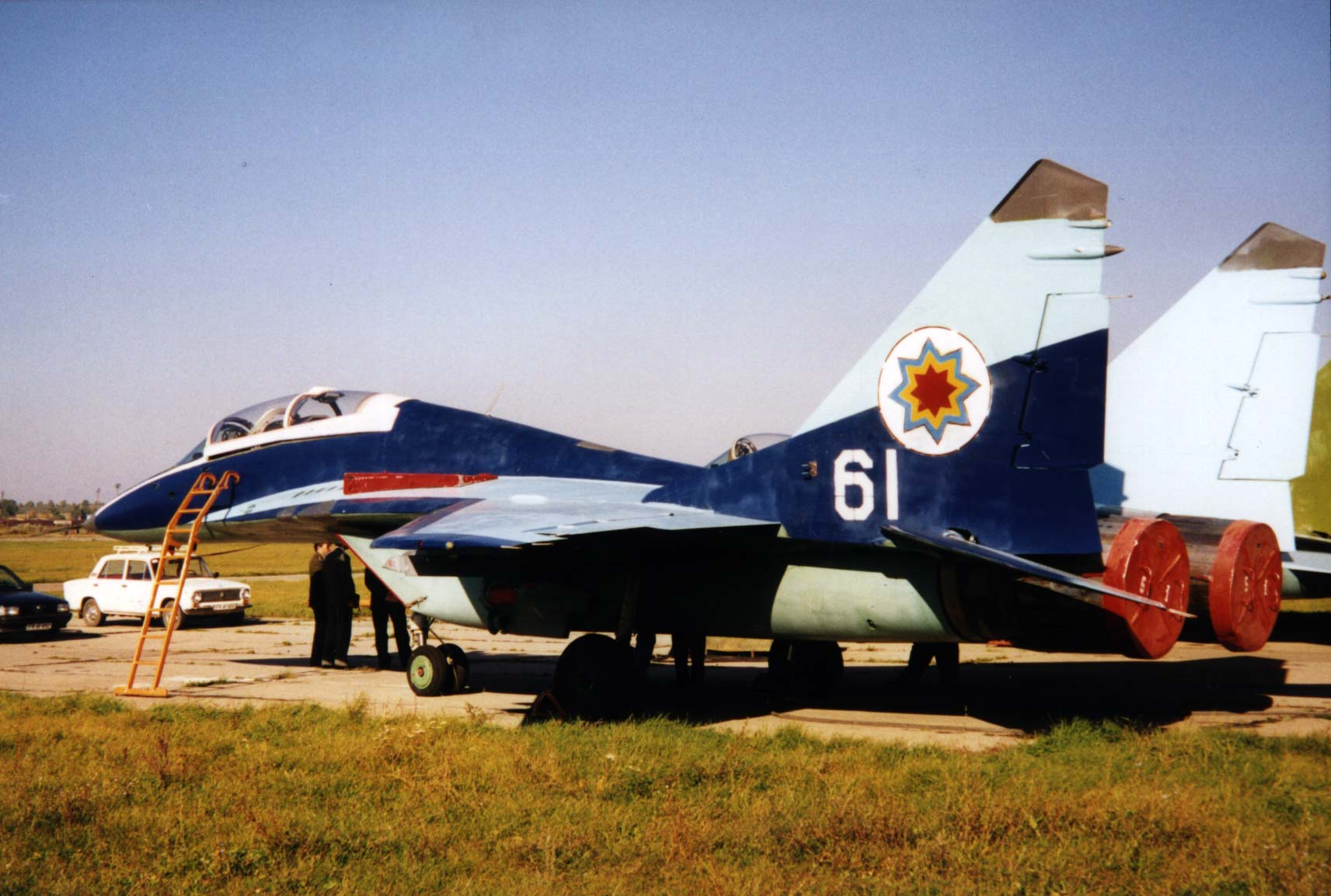
Moldovan MiG-29UB trainer (1997).

- Goodfellow AFB in San Angelo, Texas.
- NAS Fallon Airpark.
- A two-seat MiG-29UB is on display at the National Air Intelligence Center at Wright-Patterson AFB, Ohio.
- Two MiG-29s are on display at Nellis AFB. One is outside of the Threat Training Facility and another, in better shape, inside a hangar alongside a MiG-23.
- One is currently stored in a restoration hangar at the National Museum of the United States Air Force near Dayton, Ohio. As of June 2007, the aircraft has been put in display at the Cold War Exhibit of the Museum and continues to receive minor upgrading while on display.

== Accidents and combat losses ==
27 May 2005 Moldovan Air Force PZL-104 Wilga 35 crashed while practising for a display planned for the following day killing four in total.

== See also ==
- Military of Moldova
- Civil Aviation Administration of Moldova
