= Ministry of Defense (Moldova) =

Government ministry of Moldova

- Ministerul Apărării
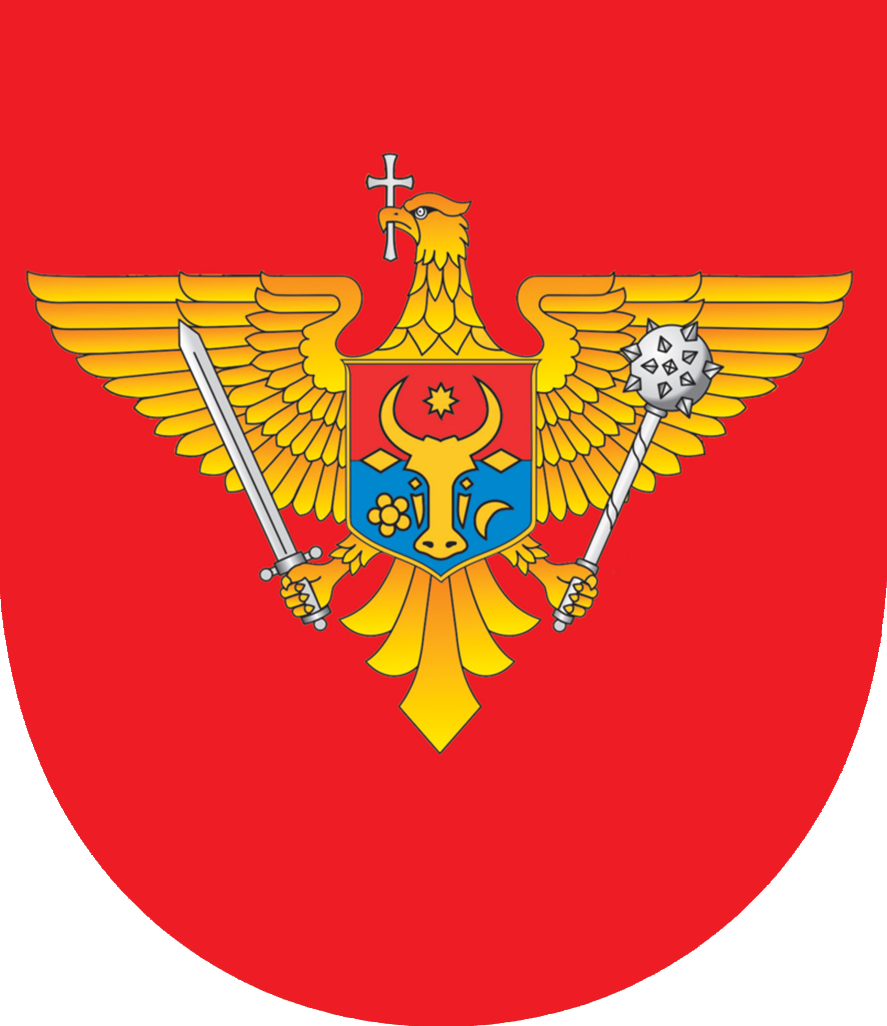
- Seal of the Ministry

Ministry overview
- Formed: 5 February 1992; 34 years ago
- Jurisdiction: Government of Moldova
- Headquarters: 84 Hîncești Street, Chișinău
- Minister responsible: Anatolie Nosatîi, Minister of Defense
- Ministry executives: Igor Cutie, Secretary General; Ghenadie Cojocaru, Secretary of State; Sergiu Plop, Secretary of State; Brigadier General Vitalie Micov, Chief of the General Staff
- Website: army.md

The Ministry of Defence (Romanian: Ministerul Apărării) is one of the fourteen ministries of the Government of Moldova. It is the main executive body responsible for managing the Moldovan National Army.

== History ==
=== Pre-history ===
During the era of the Moldavian Democratic Republic, defence policy was handled by the Director General for Armed Forces, who was a member of the Council of Directors General. The following served in this position over the course of the republic's existence:

- Major Teodor Cojocaru (7 – 11 December 1917)
- Gherman Pântea (11 December 1917 – ?)
- Constantin Brăescu (?)

In addition, in the Bessarabian Soviet Socialist Republic, the position of People's Commissar of War in the Sovnarkom was occupied by Boris Gumpert.

=== Modern ministry ===
It was founded on 5 February 1992. The official flag of the Ministry of Defense was established by Presidential Decree on 17 June 2014.

== Functions ==
The Ministry of Defense is currently responsible for carrying out the following duties:

- Organization and control of the Moldovan National Army
- Representing the armed forces in the cabinet
- Reporting to the Government of Moldova on military affairs
- Executing the military policy of the government and the President of Moldova
- Management of all military related activities and military operations
- Oversight of military construction
- Development of communication and transport systems
- Provision of military storage
- Management of military offices and institutions
- Administration of military academies
- Welfare of retired military personnel
- Equipping the armed forces with necessary technology
- Corresponding with foreign defence ministries

== Organizational structure ==
=== Leadership ===
- Minister of Defence – Anatolie Nosatîi
- Chief of the General Staff – Brigadier General Vitalie Micov
- Secretary General – Igor Cutie
- Secretaries of State – Sergiu Plop and Ghenadie Cojocaru

The cabinet of the Minister of Defense assists the defense minister in organizing/managing the main subordinate institutions of the ministry. The cabinet is also responsible for organizing meetings and coordinating protocol.

=== Departments and subordinates ===
The ministry has the following structure

- Center of Military History and Culture
- Central Sports Club of the Army
- Military Mass-Media Centre
- Consultative Diagnostic Centre
- Preventive Medical Centre
- Military Band Service
  - Presidential Band of the Republic of Moldova – Chișinău
  - Band of the 1st Infantry Motorized Brigade – Bălți
  - Band of the 2nd Infantry Motorized Brigade – Chișinău
  - Band of the 3rd Infantry Motorized Brigade – Cahul
- Alexandru cel Bun Military Academy of the Armed Forces
- Agency for Ensuring Resources and Administration of Patrimony
- Agency for Military Science and Memory
- Military Inspectorate of the Ministry of Defense
- Central Commission of Military Medical Expertise (CCMME)
- Central Military Hospital (CMH)

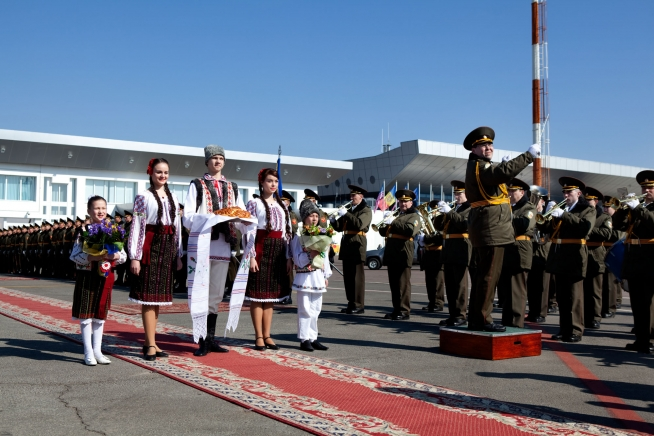
The Presidential Band of the Republic of Moldova played during Joe Biden's state visit to Moldova.

Military bands of Moldova fall under the command of the music service of the Moldovan National Army, which is currently under the supervision of the defense ministry. These bands follow the Russian and Romanian military tradition for military bands. The military bands of the army have performed and participated in international music festivals since 1997. The military bands of the National Army's Chisinau Garrison include: the Presidential Band, with the army's 1st, 2nd, and 3rd Motorized Infantry Brigade also maintaining their own military bands.

=== General Staff ===
- General Staff (J1)
  - Personnel Directorate (J2)
  - Operations Directorate (J3)
  - Directorate of Logistics (J4)
  - Strategic Planning Directorate (J5)
  - Communication and Information Systems Directorate (J6)
  - Doctrine and Joint Training Directorate (J7)
  - Management, Coordination and Monitoring Directorate
  - Law Department
  - Health Department
  - Secţia poliţie militară
- Economic and Financial Department
- Secretariat and Internal Management Department
- Legal Department
- Human Resources Management Department
- Defense Policy and Defense Planning Division
- General Inspection Directorate
- Public Relations Service

== List of ministers ==
No.	Portrait	Name (Born-Died)	Term			Political party	Government
No.	Portrait	Name (Born-Died)	Took office	Left office	Time in office	Political party	Government
1	Ion Costaș	Divisional General; Ion Costaș (born 1944)	5 February 1992	29 July 1992	175 days	Independent	Muravschi; Sangheli I
2	Pavel Creangă	Divisional General; Pavel Creangă (1933–2004)	29 July 1992	24 January 1997	4 years, 179 days	Independent	Sangheli I–II
3	Valeriu Pasat	Valeriu Pasat (born 1958)	24 January 1997	11 May 1999	2 years, 107 days	Independent	Ciubuc I–II; Sturza
4	Boris Gămurari	Army Corps General; Boris Gămurari (born 1958)	11 May 1999	19 April 2001	1 year, 343 days	Independent	Sturza; Braghiș
5	Victor Gaiciuc	Divisional General; Victor Gaiciuc (born 1957)	19 April 2001	15 October 2004	3 years, 179 days	PCRM	Tarlev I
6	Valeriu Pleșca	Valeriu Pleșca (born 1958)	29 December 2004	11 June 2007	2 years, 164 days	MFN	Tarlev I–II
7	Vitalie Vrabie	Vitalie Vrabie (born 1964)	16 July 2007	25 September 2009	2 years, 71 days	PCRM	Tarlev II; Greceanîi I–II
8	Vitalie Marinuța	Brigadier General; Vitalie Marinuța (born 1970)	25 September 2009	27 February 2014	4 years, 155 days	PL	Filat I–II; Leancă
8	Valeriu Troenco	Major General; Valeriu Troenco (born 1957)	5 April 2014	18 February 2015	319 days	PPR	Leancă
9	Viorel Cibotaru	Colonel; Viorel Cibotaru (born 1958)	18 February 2015	30 July 2015	162 days	PLDM	Gaburici
10	Anatol Șalaru	Anatol Șalaru (born 1962)	30 July 2015	27 December 2016	1 year, 150 days	PL	Streleț; Filip
11	Eugen Sturza	Eugen Sturza (born 1984)	24 October 2017	8 June 2019	1 year, 227 days	PPEM	Filip
12	Pavel Voicu	Pavel Voicu (born 1973)	8 June 2019	14 November 2019	159 days	PSRM	Sandu
(5)	Victor Gaiciuc	Divisional General; Victor Gaiciuc (born 1957)	14 November 2019	16 March 2020	123 days	PSRM	Chicu
13	Alexandru Pînzari	Chief Commissioner; Alexandru Pînzari (born 1973)	16 March 2020	9 November 2020	238 days	PDM	Chicu
(5)	Victor Gaiciuc	Divisional General; Victor Gaiciuc (born 1957)	9 November 2020	6 August 2021	329 days	PSRM	Chicu
14	Anatolie Nosatîi	Colonel; Anatolie Nosatîi (born 1972)	6 August 2021		5 years, 107 days	Independent	Gavrilița; Recean; Munteanu; Tofan

== See also ==
- Cabinet of Moldova
- Chief of the General Staff (Moldova)
- Ministry of Defense (Ukraine)
- Ministry of National Defense (Romania)
