= Anatolie Nosatîi =

Moldovan politician (born 1972)

Colonel Anatolie Nosatîi
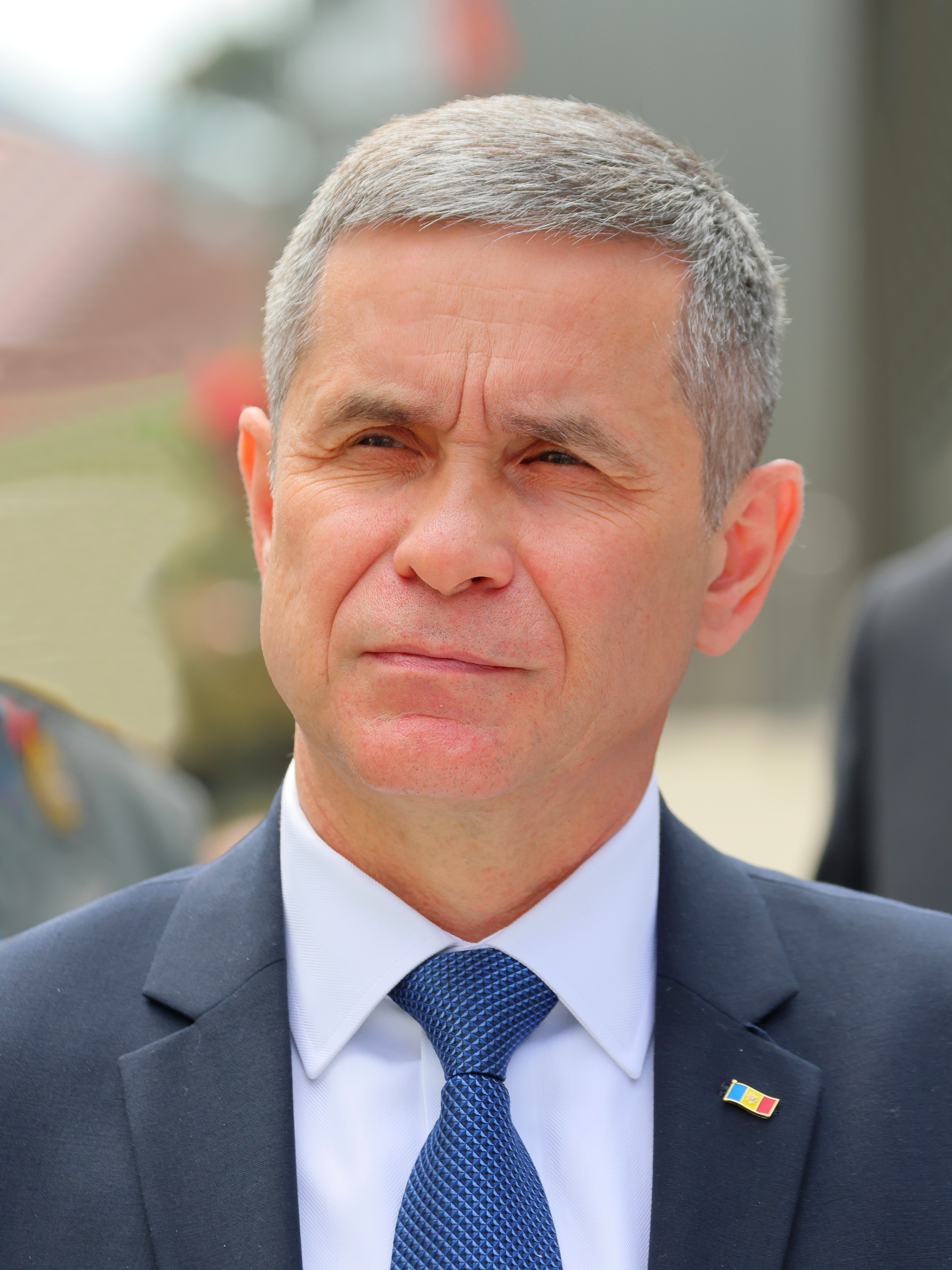
- Nosatîi in 2026

Minister of Defense
- Incumbent
- Assumed office 6 August 2021
- President: Maia Sandu
- Prime Minister: Natalia Gavrilița; Dorin Recean; Alexandru Munteanu; Eugen Osmochescu (acting); Vasile Tofan
- Preceded by: Victor Gaiciuc

Personal details
- Born: 12 September 1972 (age 53) Chișinău, Moldavian SSR, Soviet Union (now Moldova)
- Education: Odesa Military Academy; United States Army Command and General Staff College; National War College
- Awards: Iraq Campaign Medal; Bronze Star Medal; Combat Action Badge; California National Guard Commendation Medal; UN Headquarters Medal

Military service
- Branch/service: Moldovan Ground Forces
- Years of service: 1993–2020
- Rank: Colonel

Anatolie Nosatîi (born 12 September 1972) is a Moldovan military officer and politician. He has served as Minister of Defence of Moldova since 2021 and is currently the longest serving holder of the post.

== Early life and career ==
From 1987 to 1990, he studied at the Frunze Republican Boarding School in the Moldovan capital. After 1990, he studied in Ukraine, attending a command school in Kyiv before going to study at the Military Academy in Odesa. From 1994-2000, he served at the Chisinau Military College (now the Alexandru cel Bun Military Academy), rising to the post of battalion commander. In the early years of the 2000s, he commanded the 22nd Peacekeeping Battalion. In that decade, he received American education within the United States Armed Forces: first at the Defense Language Institute (1999), the Army Engineer School (1999), the Army Command and General Staff College (2005), and the National Defense University (2012). Over the course of six years until December 2014, he operated in the bureaucracy of the General Staff, before briefly serving as the Moldovan military advisor at the United Nations Department of Peace Operations.

== Minister of Defence ==
He was appointed on 6 August 2021 as part of the Gavrilița Cabinet. On 6 August, Nosatii was introduced by President Maia Sandu and Premier Natalia Gavrilița to the command of the Moldovan National Army. Nosatii met a couple of weeks later with his Ukrainian counterpart Andriy Taran in Kyiv on Ukrainian Independence Day to strengthen his country's cooperation with that the Ukrainian Armed Forces.

== Personal life ==
He speaks four languages: Romanian, English, Russian, and French. He has been awarded the Orders of Loyalty to the Motherland, the United Nations Medal, and the Bronze Star Medal.

Political offices
Preceded by Victor Gaiciuc	Minister of Defense; 2021–present	Incumbent
