= 3rd Motorized Infantry Brigade "Dacia" =

- Brigada 3 Infanterie Motorizată „Dacia”
- Active: 24 February 1992-present
- Country: Moldova
- Branch: Moldovan Ground Forces
- Type: Motorized Infantry
- Garrison/HQ: Cahul
- Nickname: The Dacia Brigade
- Engagements: Transnistria War
- Battle honours: Order of Allegiance to the Fatherland 1st class (2018)

Commanders
- Current commander: Oleg Guzu

Insignia
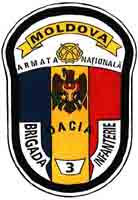
- Ceremonial Flag

The 3rd Motorized Infantry Brigade "Dacia" is a motorized infantry unit of the Moldovan National Army's Ground Forces based in Cahul.

== History ==
The Dacia Motorized Infantry Brigade in Cahul was created on February 24, 1992, by the decree of the President of the Republic of Moldova. The brigade was among the first units of the National Army to take the oath of faith to the Republic of Moldova and its citizens on March 4, 1992. The brigade is made up of former Soviet Army units in Cahul and Gagauzia's Comrat. It was among the first units to engage in the Transnistria War in 1992. In 2018, the unit was awarded the State Order "Faith of the Homeland" 1st class. It celebrated its 28th anniversary in 2020 with an oath taking ceremony and a military parade on Independence Square in Cahul in the presence of Defense Minister Victor Gaiciuc.

== Structure ==
- Headquarters
- 31st Battalion
- Military Band

== Cooperation ==
The 31st battalion of the brigade is an official partner of the Grand Duke Kęstutis Infantry Battalion of the Lithuanian Land Forces.
