= Moldovan National Army =

National Army of the Republic of Moldova
- Armata Națională a Republicii Moldova
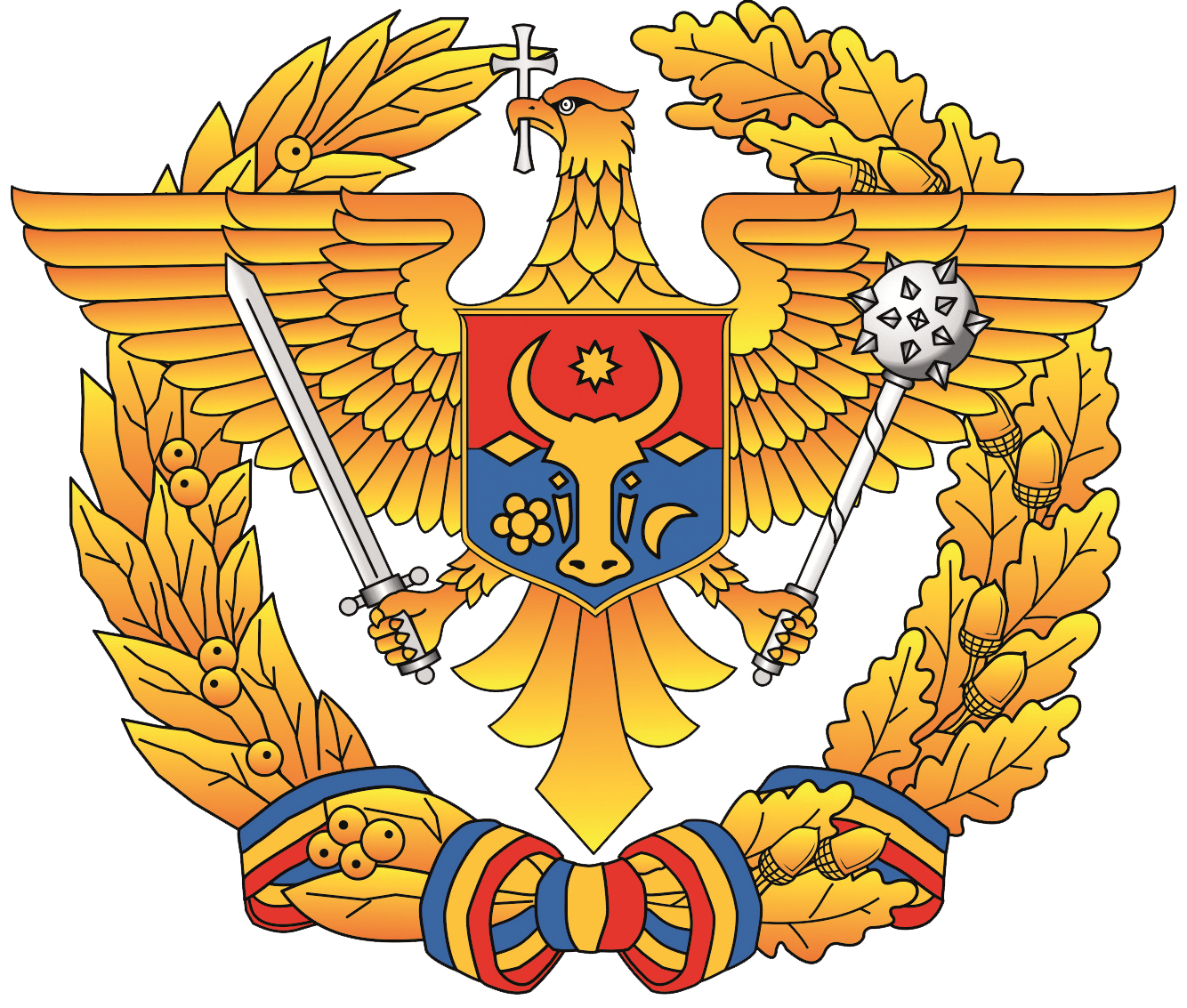
- Emblem of the Moldovan National Army
- Founded: 3 September 1991
- Country: Moldova
- Role: Land warfare Aerial warfare
- Part of: Armed Forces of the Republic of Moldova
- Headquarters: Chișinău
- Motto: Pentru Onoare Pentru Patrie Pentru Tricolor (For Honour For Fatherland For Tricolor)
- Sub-branches: General Staff ∟ Land Force Command ∟ Air Force Command
- Engagements: Transnistria War Kosovo Force Multi-National Force – Iraq

Commanders
- Chief of the General Staff: Brigader General Vitalie Micov
- Deputy Chief for Defense Resources: Brigadier General Sergiu Voinu
- Deputy Chief for Operations and Training: Brigadier General Ion Ojog
- Master Sergeant of the National Army: Senior Sergeant Andrei Cojocaru

The Moldovan National Army (Romanian: Armata Națională a Republicii Moldova) is the senior branch of the Armed Forces of the Republic of Moldova composed of the Land Forces and the Air Force. The National Army is considered to be the regular duty military force while the other branch of the armed forces, the General Inspectorate of Carabinieri, is focused on paramilitary activities.

== History ==
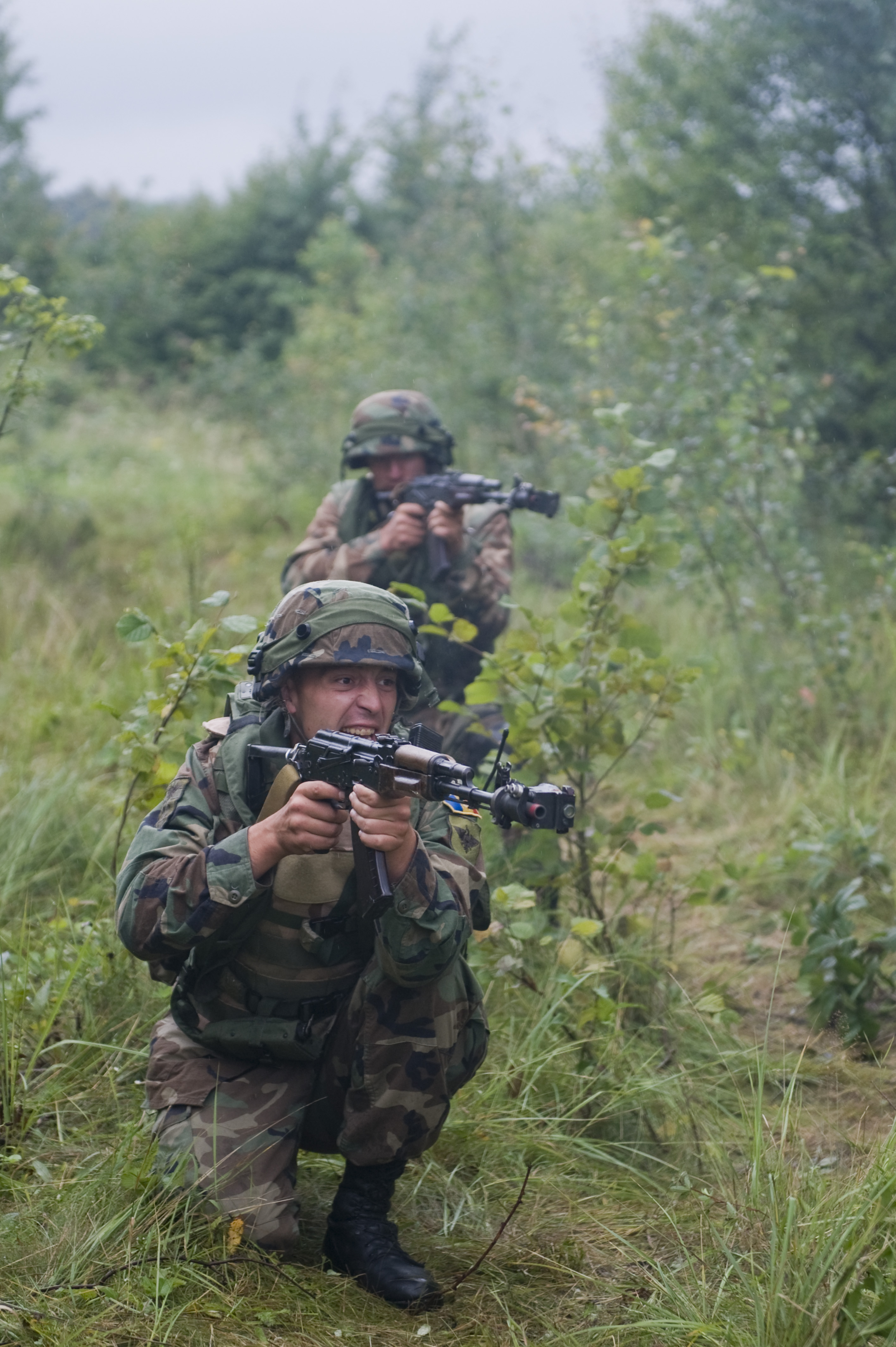
Moldavan soldiers in 2011.

The National Army was officially established on 3 September 1991 on the basis of the Soviet Army's 14th Guards Army. Parts of the 14th Guards Army, especially the 86th Guards Motor Rifle Division, were inherited by Moldova in early 1992. In early 1994, the Land Forces of the National Army consisted of 9,800 soldiers, organized into three motorized brigades, an artillery brigade, and a reconnaissance battalion. The General Staff was established on 24 April 1994 by the decision of the Government of Moldova. In 2007, at the behest of President Vladimir Voronin, the number of Moldovan National Army servicemen was reduced from 8,500 to 6,500 as a result of a rapid reform that was in response to concerns from Transnistria over a potential conflict. The National Army has been participating in the Joint Combined Exchange Training with United States European Command since 2009.The cooperation protocol between the National Army and the International Committee of the Red Cross was signed in Chișinău in 2016. On 3 October 2017, President Igor Dodon became the first Moldovan leader to hold a working meeting with commanders of units in the National Army. Earlier that September, Dodon had banned the participation of National Army servicemen in exercises abroad without his consent. In early 2020, Defence Minister Victor Gaiciuc signed an agreement with Bishop Vladimir (Cantarean) of the Moldovan Orthodox Church on religious cooperation with the National Army. By 2021, all conscription requirements for the National Army are planned to be fulfilled in order for the country to transfer from compulsory military service to soldiers being hired on a contract basis.

During the 2021–2022 fiscal year, Moldova increased military spending by more than 150 percent.

== General Staff ==
The General Staff planning combat and training activities and improves the mobilization capacity of troops as well as operational combat and mobilization training. It is the main body that ensures a Supreme Command that is led by the President of the Republic who is also the Supreme Commander of the Armed Forces. The position of Chief of the General Staff of the National Army (Marelui Stat Major al Armatei Republicii Moldova) executes the paramount leadership of the troops through the army commands. He/she assists the Minister of Defense and the President in commanding the National Army. The first one was Colonel Pavel Chirău, who took office in April 1994. In wartime situations, the Chief of the General Staff becomes the de facto First Deputy Supreme Commander-in-Chief of the Armed Forces should the Minister of Defense be a civilian.

=== Structure ===
- General Staff (J1)
  - Personnel Directorate (J2)
  - Operations Directorate (J3)
  - Directorate of Logistics (J4)
  - Strategic Planning Directorate (J5)
  - Communication and Information Systems Directorate (J6)
    - Center of Communications and Informatics
  - Doctrine and Joint Training Directorate (J7)
  - Management, Coordination and Monitoring Directorate
  - Law Department
  - Health Department
- Economic and Financial Department
- Secretariat and Internal Management Department
- Legal Department
- Human Resources Management Department
- Defense Policy and Defense Planning Division
- General Inspection Directorate
- Public Relations Service
- General Staff Regiment "Brigadier General Nicolae Petrică"
  - Military police

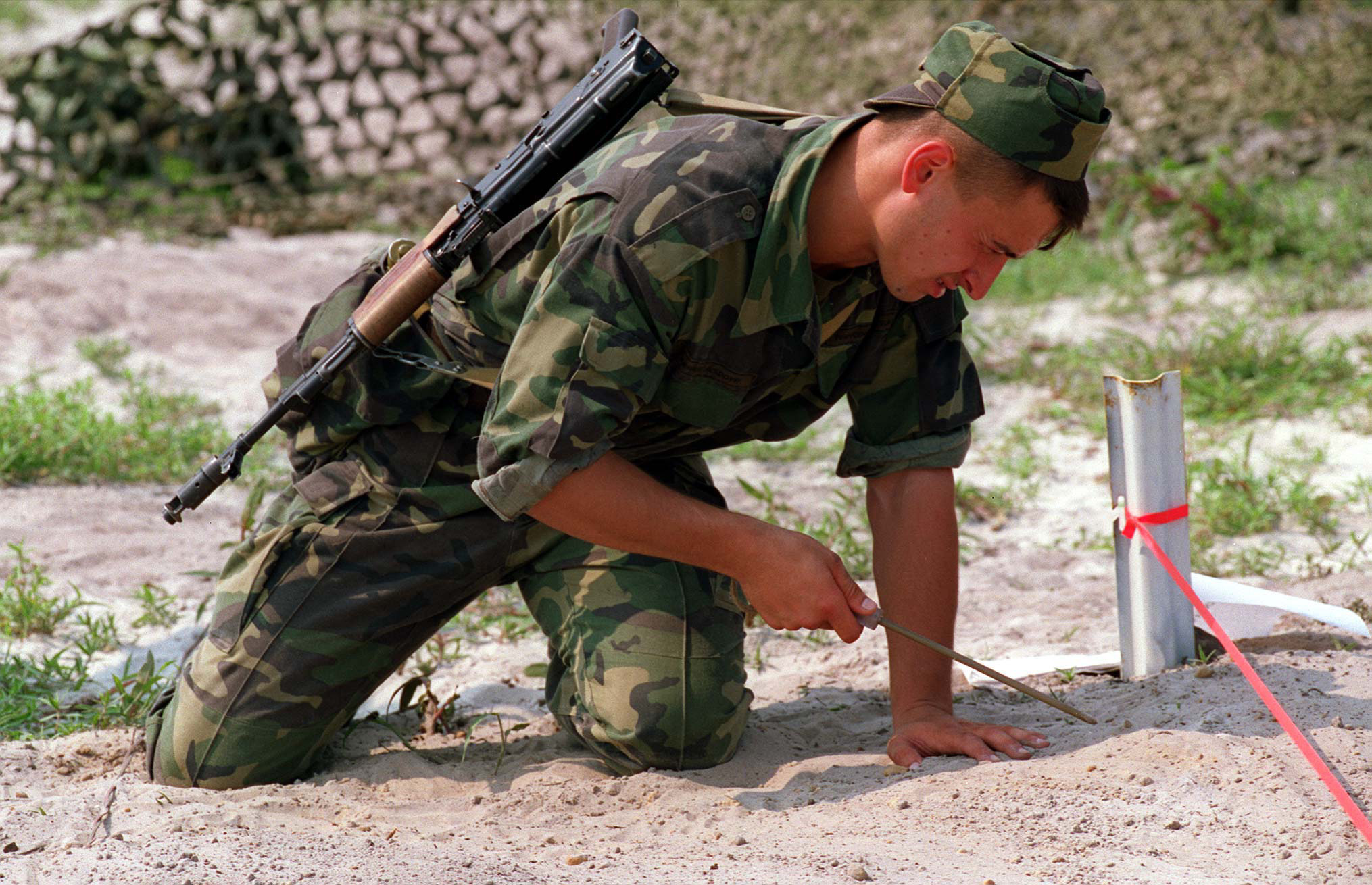
Moldavan soldier in a demining exercise.

==== Operations Directorate ====
The J3 Operations Directorate develops operational plans on the engagement of the National Army during peacetime and crisis situations.

==== Logistics Directorate ====
The Directorate of Logistics implements policies issued by the Ministry of Defence concerning logistic support. It also manages, monitors and organises the distribution of material goods for troops. It has centralized archive of the record of weapons, military equipment, and ammunition.

==== Military Police ====
The Military Police Section has duties that include operative coordination, on the monitoring and protection of military personnel, guarding military installations, ensuring military discipline and order. It also controls the direction of the military car technique in road traffic.

==== Cyber Incident Response Center ====
The Cyber Incident Response Center of the National Army of the Republic of Moldova was established in early 2021 with NATO support. Defense Minister Victor Gaiciuc, said it "will increase the Ministry of Defence’s posture and capacity to respond to cyber threats".

== Training ==
=== Alexandru cel Bun Military Academy ===
The Alexandru cel Bun Military Academy is the main military academy of Moldova. It is named after Alexander I of Moldavia, who ruled the country as Voivode (Prince) from 1400 and 1432. Between 1993 and 2013, the academy trained over 1,700 servicemen.

=== University military departments ===
University military departments offer graduates to receive the status of "Young Specialist" as well as the rank of either reserve soldier or reserve junior sergeant, which automatically exempts them from mandatory military service for a year. Consequently, they will receive a military ID card in addition to their diploma. Graduates of military departments can enter service in the National Army, the Carabinieri, and emergency rescue battalions. Enrollment in the military department exempts students from conscription. During their studies, students gain not only theoretical knowledge but also practical training in drill and mandatory firing exercises. The military department's training period is four months and there are two cohorts per year: from September to December/January and from February to May/June. Each cohort consists of approximately 130-160 students (including 18-20 women).

University	Notes
Moldova State University	The Military Department of the State University of the Republic of Moldova was established at Chisinau State University in 1946, pursuant to Order No. 95 of the Minister of Education Aleksei Kalashnikov, dated July 1, 1946. Lieutenant General Leonid Dulshikov was appointed as the first head of the military department (1946–1947). On August 21, 1991, military training for students at the department was discontinued effective September 1, 1991. The Senate of the State University of Moldova, with the approval of the Ministry of Defense, decided at its meeting on February 25, 2003, to reestablish the Military Department. The military department resumed operations on October 1, 2003. Currently, the department employs 25 instructors. Alumni from the military department have included Petru Lucinschi, Valeriu Pasat, Boris Gămurari, Valeriu Pleșca, and Viorel Cibotaru.
Technical University of Moldova	
State Agrarian University of Moldova	
Comrat State University	The department was founded by the decision of the KSU Senate in October 2002 and began its work on February 9, 2003. The military department was formed thanks to the initiative of Colonel A. Kulikov, and the support of the Executive Committee of Gagauzia. After completing the 3.5-month course, cadets are promoted to the rank of sergeant or senior sergeant. Classes are conducted with both theoretical and practical training, which requires cadets to travel to the 3rd Motorized Infantry Brigade "Dacia".

=== Alexandru cel Bun Military College ===
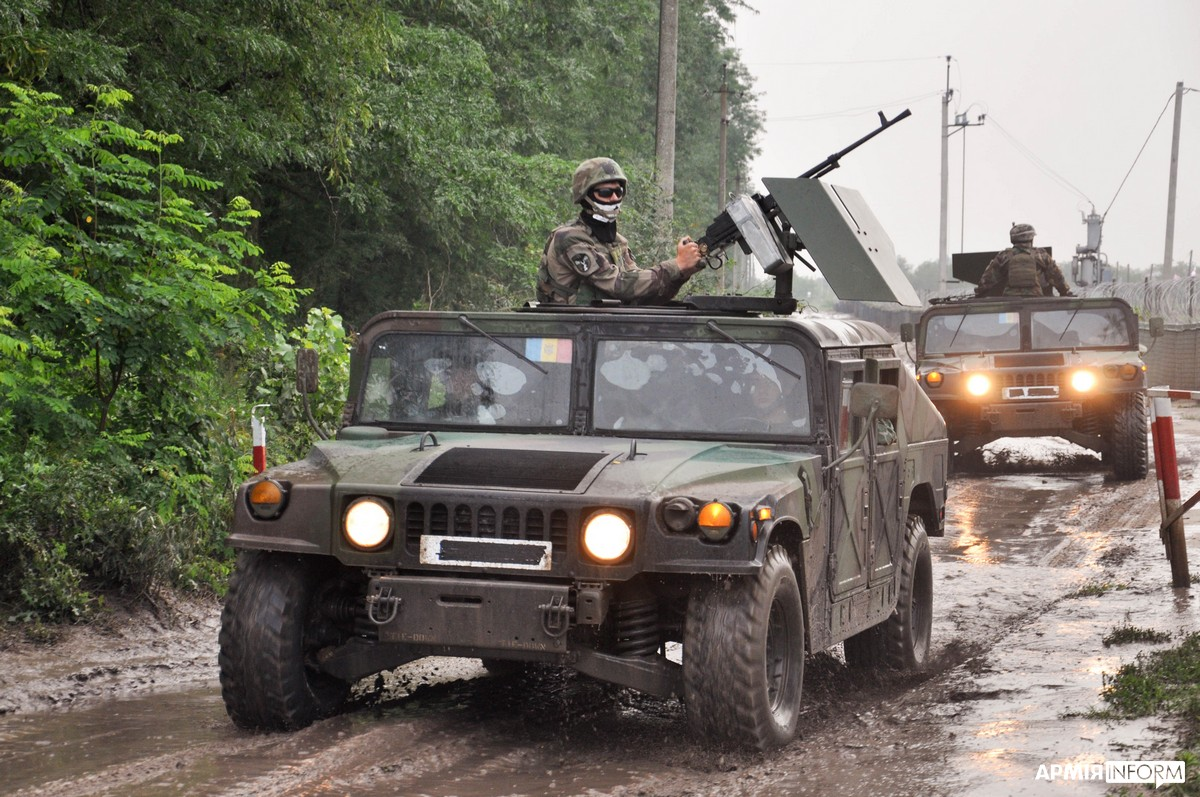
Moldavan Army HMMWV.

== Military areas ==
National Army garrisons are located in the following cities: Chișinău, Bălți, Cahul and Ungheni. A military proving ground is located in Bulboaca, Anenii Noi. It is the largest of its kind in the Republic of Moldova, with an area of 21 kilometers. There are several specialized sectors on the territory of the base, where the military carries out both daily exercises and preparations for multinational applications. Within the military base, training that is done includes throwing hand grenades, planting mines, chemical protection training (NBC) and providing first aid. Other installations are usually Military Camps (Tabăra Militară) and can be found all over the country, such as Military Camp 142 and Military Camp 123.

== Associations ==
The National Army Commanding Officer Corps (Romanian: Corpul ofițerului de comandă al armatei naționale) is the official organization in the National Army that serves all of its commissioned officers. The National Army Women's Association (NAWA) is an extracurricular association that offers support to National Army's female military and civilian personnel. It was established on 28 February 2019 and was launched on 7 June 2019 in the presence of Minister of Defense Eugen Sturza and Deputy Prime Minister for Reintegration Cristina Lesnic. The NAWA consists of 37 officers led by its president, Colonel Mariana Grama. On 24 January 2020, the first meeting of the National Council for War Veterans Affairs since its creation was held in the capital in the presence of Prime Minister Ion Chicu.

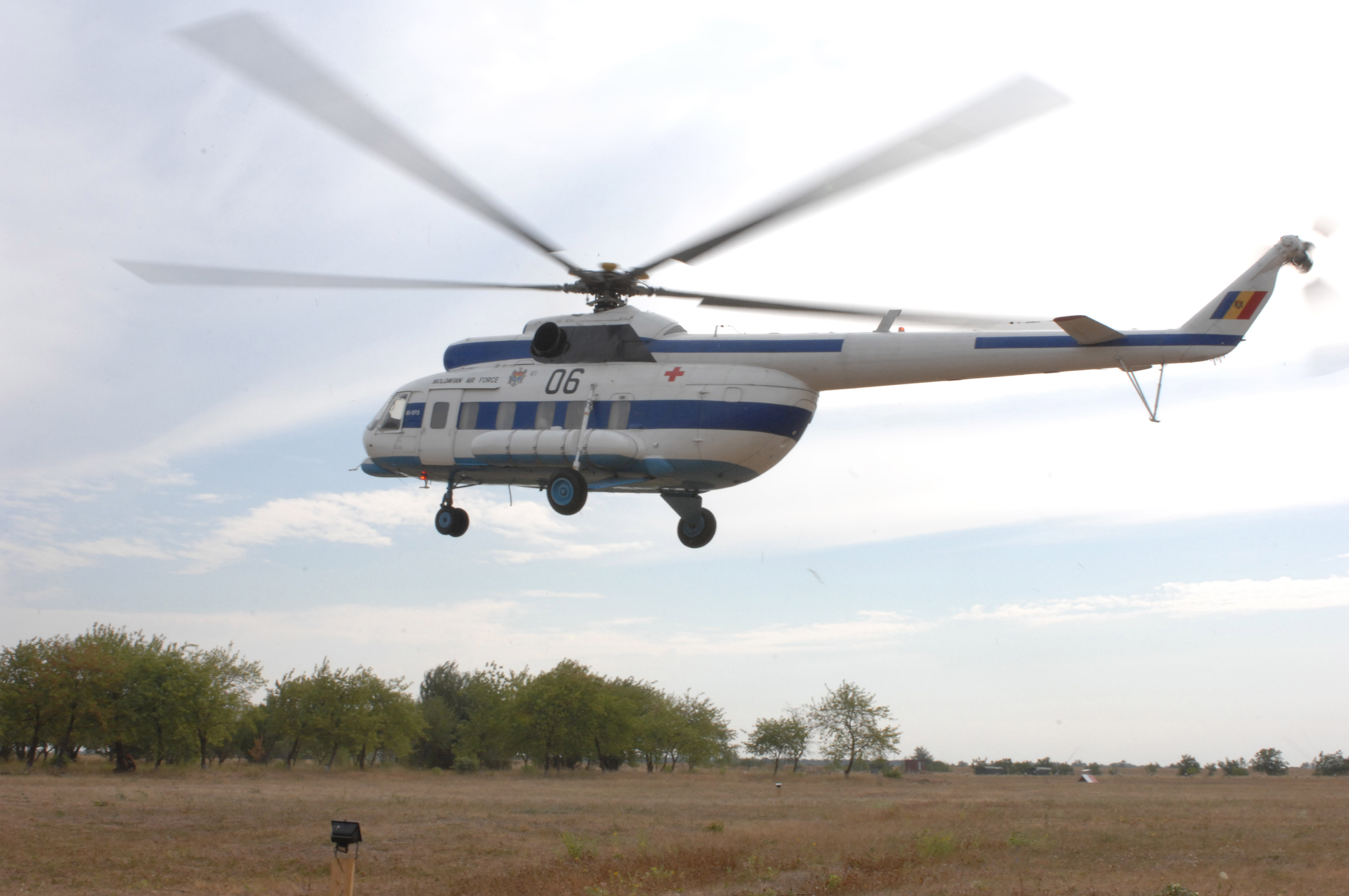
Moldavan Air Forces Command Mil Mi-8.

== Traditions ==
- Currently, the Honor Guard Company is the only unit in the armed forces to utilize the goose step. Outside of the company, the regular army uses a Romanian style march step. This was established in 2011 by order of Defense Minister Vitalie Marinuța in time for the Chișinău Independence Day Parade. The formula was considered to be a new, more NATO-style marching formula, done to "preserve the health" of servicemen.
- Since 2020, a formal flag-raising military ceremony has been held at all military installations.
- The Defense Minister's Cup is a skills and sports competition held yearly for National Army service members.

=== National Army Day ===
On 2 September, the National Army marks its professional own holiday, Ziua Armatei Naționale (Day of the National Army). The President of Moldova and the Prime Minister of Moldova usually present congratulations and decorations to all active and veteran servicemen. The Ministry of Defense usually organizes large demonstrations on the holiday. Military officials lay flowers at the Stephen the Great Monument and the Eternity Memorial Complex. Festive activities are also organized in local cities. In 2018, the National Army Day silver jubilee celebrations were held by the 1st Motorized Infantry Brigade "Moldova" in Bălți.

== In popular culture ==
- The project "24 Hours in the National Army" is a media event involving representatives of 12 media Moldovan media institutions. The project is organized by Mass-media information and communication service, together with Special Forces Battalion at the National Army Military Training Centre from Bulboaca. It has been attended by representatives of national and regional media institutions such as PRO TV, Moldova 1, and TVR Moldova. The first edition of the project was organized in 2006.

== See also ==
- Belarusian Ground Forces
- Ukrainian Ground Forces
- Romanian Army
