= Central Band of the Moldovan Border Police =

Ceremonial unit in Moldova

The Central Band of the Moldovan Border Police (Romanian: Orchestra Politiei de Frontiera; Russian: Oркестр Пограничной полиции МВД Молдовы) also known as the Fanfara Poliției de Frontieră is a Moldovan artistic group of professional who represent the image of the Moldovan Border Police through their ceremonial music. It commonly performs masterpieces that cover various musical genres, which include military marches, waltzes, tango, and national music folklore. The band is always present at events organized by the Border Police, which include but are not limited to official holidays, military rites, the submission of the Moldovan Oath of Faith, sports competitions, etc.

Notable leaders of the band include Simon Arnaut, Petru Sudelea and its current leader, Lieutenant Colonel Andrei Florea.

== Brief history ==
In August 1992, shortly after the creation of the Moldovan Border Troops (now the Border Police), a military band made up of 10 musicians led by conductor Simon Arnaut was created. Initially, the band included only 3 professional musicians, with the rest composing of conscript soldiers. The band was reorganized in 1996 to include a professional staff who are graduates of the College of Folk Creation in Socora. The band increased its number of musicians to 20 the following year, and eventually was divided to include a Fanfare Orchestra and folk music band in 2010.

== See also ==
- Chișinău Independence Day Parade
- Presidential Orchestra of the Republic of Moldova
- Band of the Department of Carabinier Troops
- Honor Guard Company (Moldova)
