= Chișinău Independence Day Parade =

National event in Chișinău, Moldova

Chisinau Independence Day Parade Parada Militară a Chișinău de Ziua Independenței Republicii Moldova
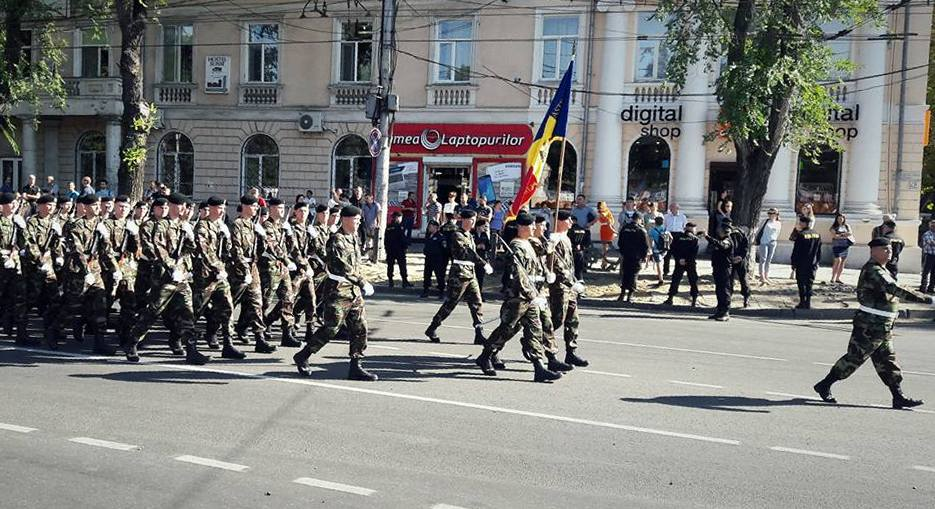
- The parade in 2016.
- Genre: Military parades
- Date: August 27
- Begins: 10:30 am
- Ends: 12:00 pm
- Frequency: Quinquennial
- Venue: Great National Assembly Square
- Location: Chișinău
- Country: Moldova
- Previous event: 2021
- Next event: 2026 (expected)

The Chișinău Independence Day Parade is one of the events of the Independence Day of Moldova held by the Moldovan National Army. The parade is held in Chișinău, Moldova on August 27 every 5 to 10 years on Great National Assembly Square.

== History of Moldovan military parades ==
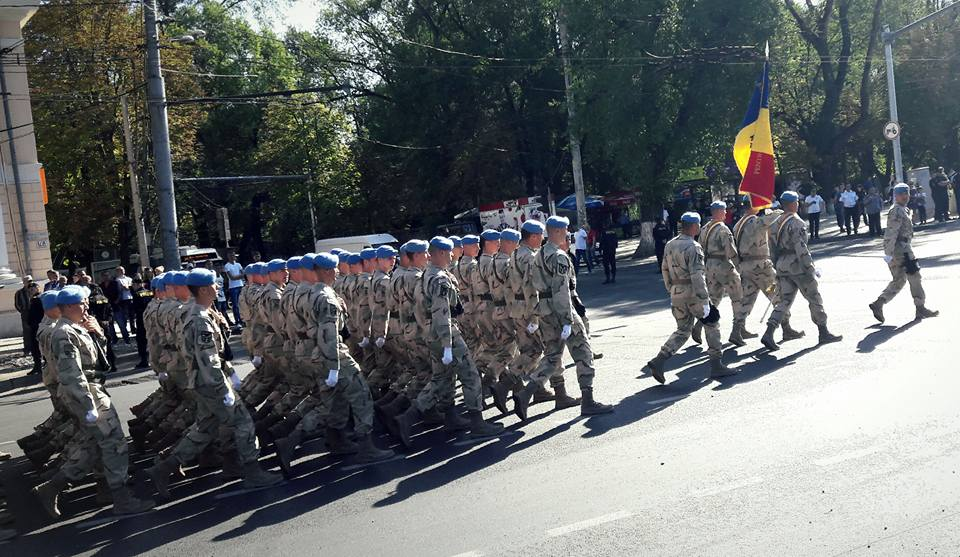
The 22nd Peacekeeping Battalion during the parade.

Before 1991 parades in the Moldavian Soviet Socialist Republic were held in honor of the October Revolution, Victory Day, and until 1969 May Day. In 1976, Chișinău hosted a parade in honor of the 50th anniversary of its integration into the Soviet Union, held in the presence of General Secretary Leonid Brezhnev and First Secretary Ivan Bodiul. The final military parade in the Moldovan SSR took place in 1989 in honor of the October Revolution, which was marred by protests that occurred in the capital. On the morning of 7 November, a group of 100 people from the Popular Front of Moldova took candles and stood in front of Soviet tanks preparing for the parade. As a result, the mobile column of the parade was interrupted and abruptly canceled by the ruling authorities, with the leaders of Communist Party of Moldova left the central stage immediately. Moldova would not hold another military parade until 1999.

== Independence parades ==
=== 1999 ===
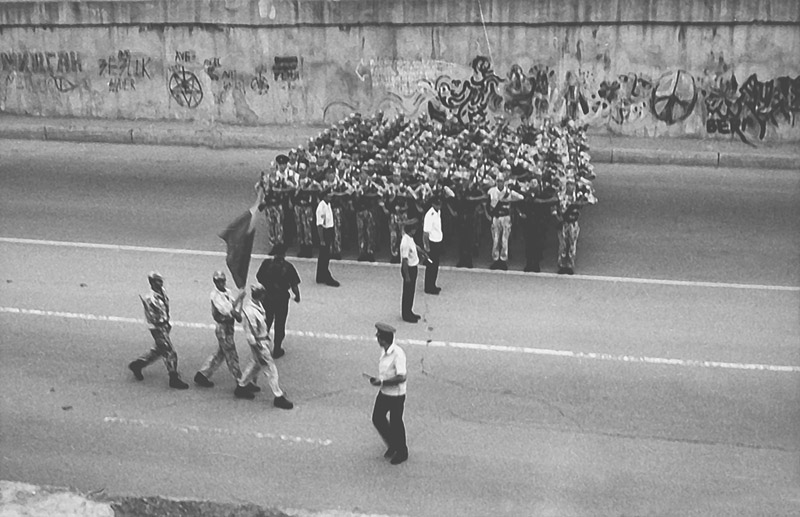
A rehearsal for the 1999 parade.

In 1999, Moldova celebrated the 8th anniversary of independence. It was the first parade since the fall of the USSR. Taking the salute was Defence Minister Boris Gămurari.

=== 2001 ===
In 2001, Moldova celebrated the 10th anniversary of independence. It was ordered by President Vladimir Voronin in early July. The parade saw 1,700 servicemen, representing 13 subunits, six under the Ministry of Defense, six under the Ministry of Interior and one from the Department of Border Troops take part. For the parade, the servicemen received new uniforms and underwent a special training program for several weeks. The parade was received by the Minister of Defense, Colonel Victor Gaiciuc in a GAZ M21 Volga convertible.

=== 2011 ===
2011 celebrated the 20th anniversary of independence. Acting President Marian Lupu, who signed the order for the parade that April delivered the holiday address during the parade. Inspecting the parade from a GAZ-24 cabriolet parade car was the Minister of Defense of Moldova Vitalie Marinuța while the officer commanding the parade was Brigadier General Vitalie Stoian from the National Army's General Staff. Dress rehearsals took place three, seven and ten days before the parade, with the first rehearsal on August being attended by Prime Minister of Moldova Vlad Filat. It was the first time military equipment had been brought to the central square since 1989. At the head of the parade were the flag of Moldova, as well as the military banners of the Emperor Stefan the Great, which were brought to Chișinău from Romania as a gesture on their part. The contingent of veterans of the Transnistrian War was led by Division General Ion Costaș, a former Minister of Interior (1990–1992) and Defence (1992). A new, more western style marching formula was used for the parade as well as new military uniforms were used during the parade.

=== 2016 ===
2016 celebrated the silver jubilee of Moldovan independence. It was the first to use a revised format that was similar to the Great Union Day Parade in Bucharest. The following 6 foreign contingents took part in the parade for the first time: Odesa Military Academy (Ukraine), the Michael the Brave 30th Guards Brigade and the Asociatia Traditia Militara contingent (Romania), the Representative Honor Guard Battalion of the Polish Armed Forces (Poland), the Grand Duke Gediminas Staff Battalion (Lithuania), and a 4-man group from the Royal Irish Regiment (United Kingdom). Servicemen of the Russian Armed Forces were also invited to the parade. More than 2,000 soldiers, as well as veterans of the army marched in the parade. The commander of the parade was the Chief of the General Staff of the Moldovan Armed Forces, Brigadier General Igor Cutie. During the 2016 parade, Moldovan police fired tear gas to disperse anti-government protesters who were participating in the 2015–16 protests. Opposition parties previously had called for rallies to disrupt the military parade, launching an "I'm not afraid" campaign on social media. Opposition lawyer Anna Ursaki said the following in favor of protests: "If the authorities have the right to organize parades, to have a feast during the plague, when people are miserable, we have the right to protests".

=== 2021 ===
2021 marked the 30th anniversary of independence. The action plan for the parade was approved by the government in June and President Maia Sandu signed the corresponding decree on July 23. It costed 2 million Moldovan leu. 1,200 participants (800 from the National Army and 420 from the security services) took part in the parade, which took place within a framework to stop the spread of the COVID-19 pandemic in Moldova. The parade was led by Brigadier General Igor Gorgan, with Cristian Tabîrţa serving as chief standard bearer.

The following dignitaries were in attendance:

- Moldovan president Maia Sandu
- Moldovan prime minister Natalia Gavrilița
- President of the Moldovan Parliament Igor Grosu
- Moldovan defence minister Anatolie Nosatîi
- Romanian president Klaus Iohannis (who arrived in time for the start of the march past)
- Romanian defence minister Nicolae Ciucă
- Polish president Andrzej Duda
- Ukrainian president Volodymyr Zelenskyy
- Ukrainian prime minister Denys Shmyhal

=== 2026 ===
2026 marked the 35th anniversary of the proclamation of independence. On June 5, 2026, President Sandu, signed decrees establishing a commemorative badge dedicated to the "Participant in the military parade, dedicated to the XXXV anniversary of the proclamation of the independence of the Republic of Moldova, August 27, 2026". The national anthem was performed by the soprano Valentina Nafornița. The parade was led by Deputy Chief for Operations and Training Brigadier General Ion Ojog. For the first time, veterans of the interior ministry also took part alongside veterans of the national army. Formations and color guard units from Romania (Michael the Brave 30th Guards Brigade), Ukraine (Kyiv Presidential Honor Guard Battalion), Germany (German Armed Forces Technical Advisory Group), Lithuania (Grand Duke Kęstutis Infantry Battalion), Italy (232nd Signal Regiment), Poland (Representative Honor Guard Battalion of the Polish Armed Forces), France (12th Foreign Infantry Regiment), the Czech Republic (Honor Guard of the Czech Armed Forces, Prague Garrison Command), the United States (North Carolina Army National Guard), and other countries participated in the parade.

== Parade composition ==
The parade has the following general composition:

- Color Guards (Flag of Moldova and Stephen the Great)
- Veterans of the Transnistria War and the Soviet-Afghan War
- Officers of the National Army
- Alexandru cel Bun Military Academy
- Infantry of the National Army
  - 1st Motorized Infantry Brigade "Moldova"
  - 2nd Motorized Infantry Brigade "Stefan Cel Mare"
  - 3rd Motorized Infantry Brigade "Dacia"
  - 22nd Peacekeeping Battalion
- Forces of the Ministry of Internal Affairs
  - Ştefan cel Mare Police Academy
  - Special Forces Brigade "Fulger"
  - Officers of the General Police Inspectorate
  - Inspectorate General of the Trupele de Carabinieri
  - Moldovan Border Police
  - General Inspectorate for Emergency Situations
- Honor Guard Company of the National Army

=== Military bands in attendance ===
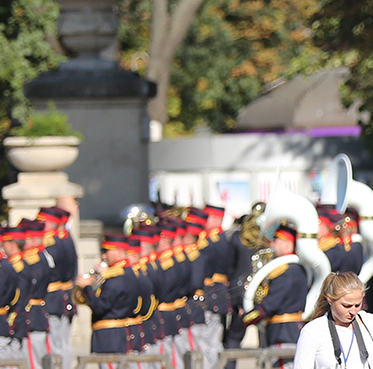
The Presidential Orchestra of the Republic of Moldova

The military bands of the Chișinău Garrison who take part in the parade are composed of:

- The Presidential Orchestra of the Republic of Moldova
- The Band of the 1st Motorized Infantry Brigade
- The Band of the 2nd Motorized Infantry Brigade
- The Band of the 3rd Motorized Infantry Brigade
- Band of the Alexandru cel Bun Military Academy
- Band of the Department of Carabinier Troops
- Central Band of the Border Police

== Photos of the parade ==
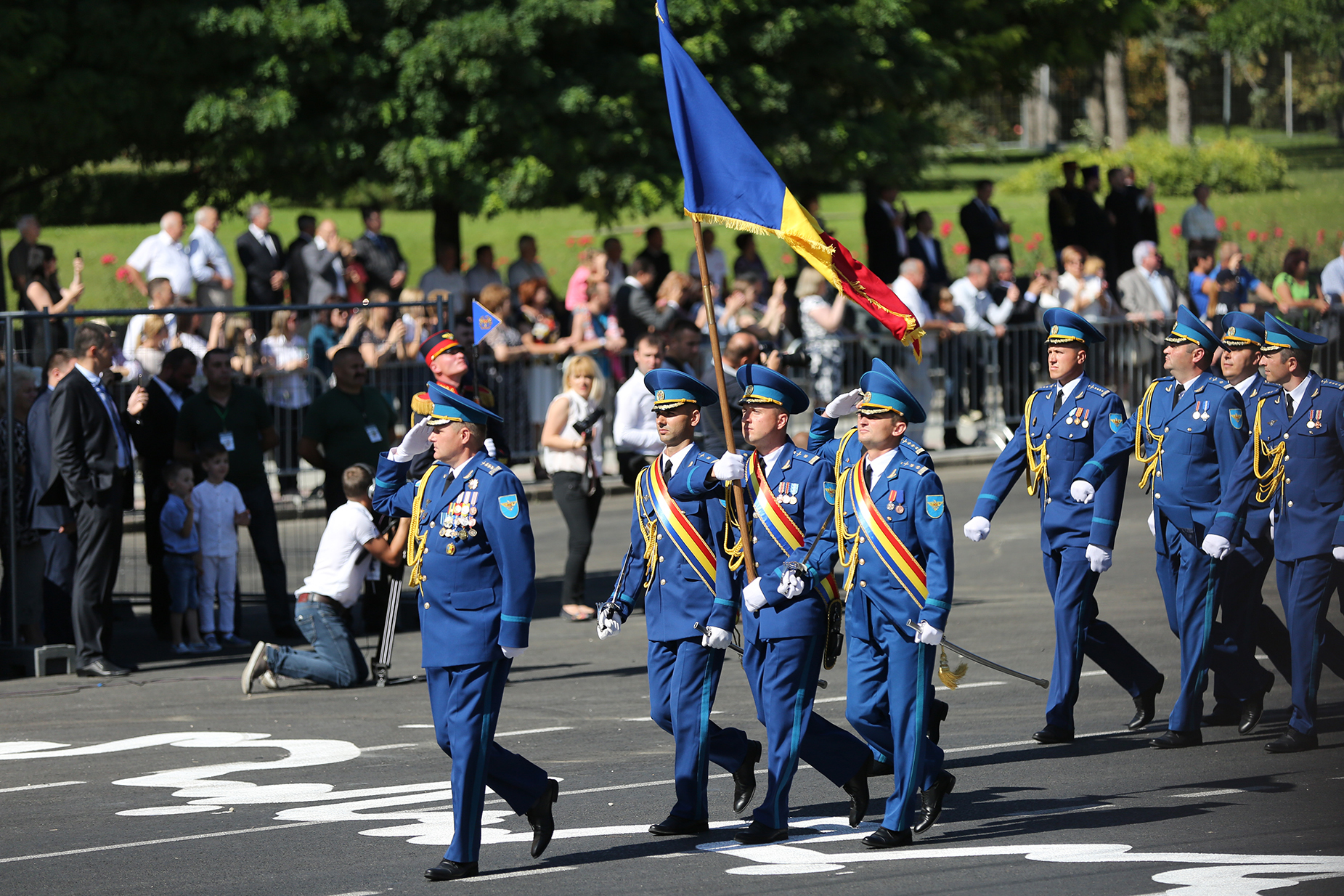
Chișinău Independence Day Parade, 2016

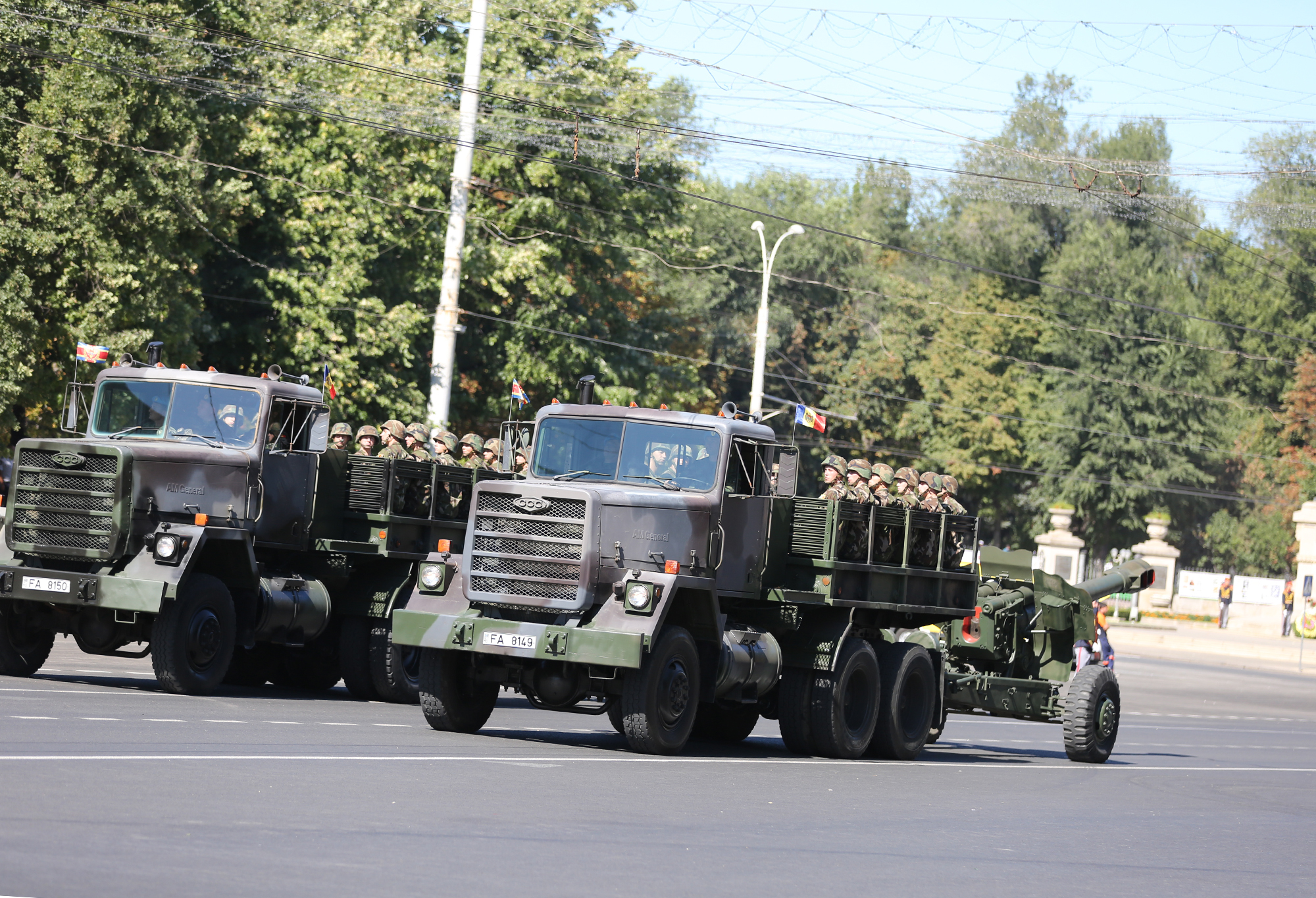
Chișinău Independence Day Parade, 2016

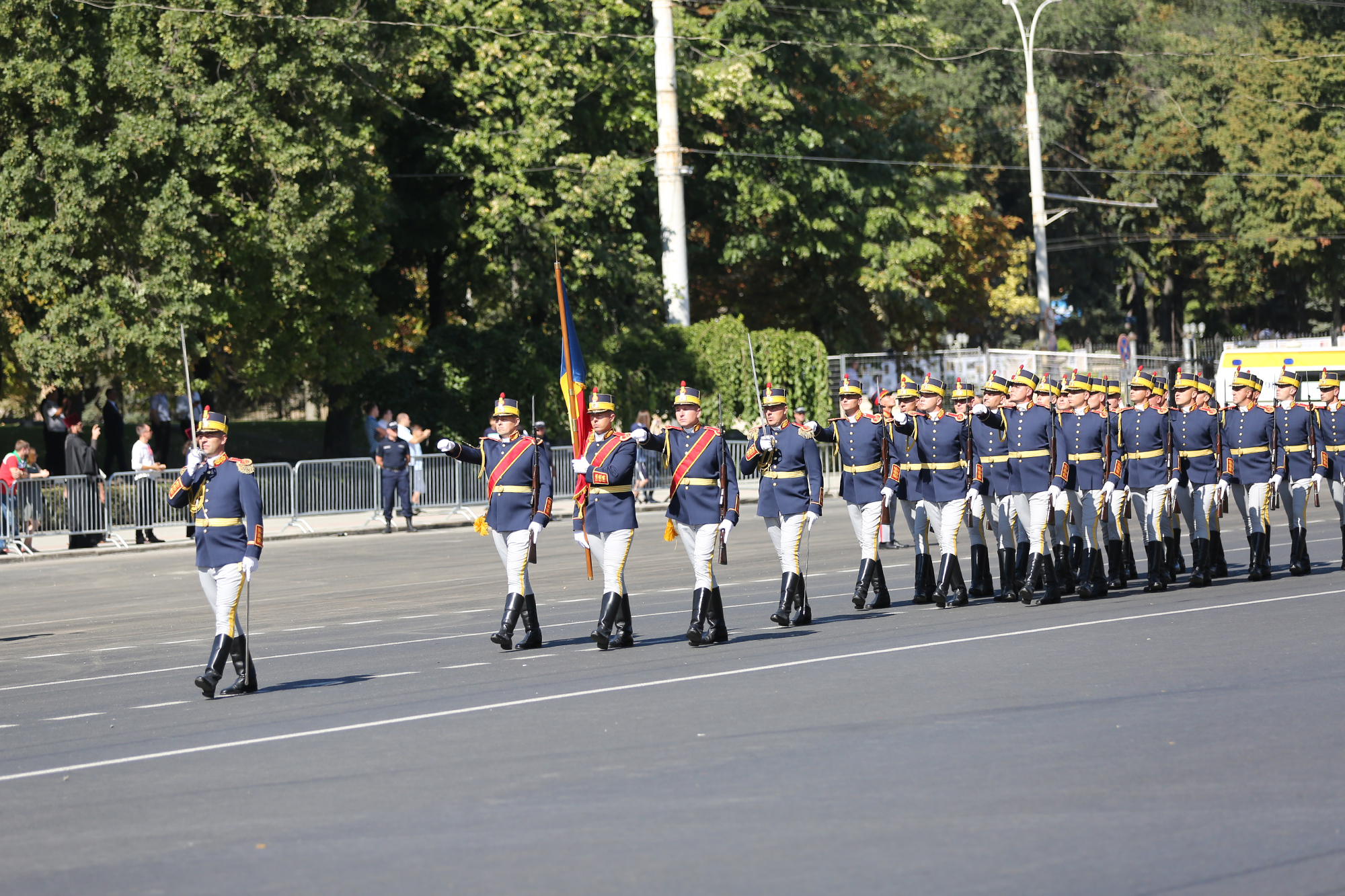
Chișinău Independence Day Parade, 2016

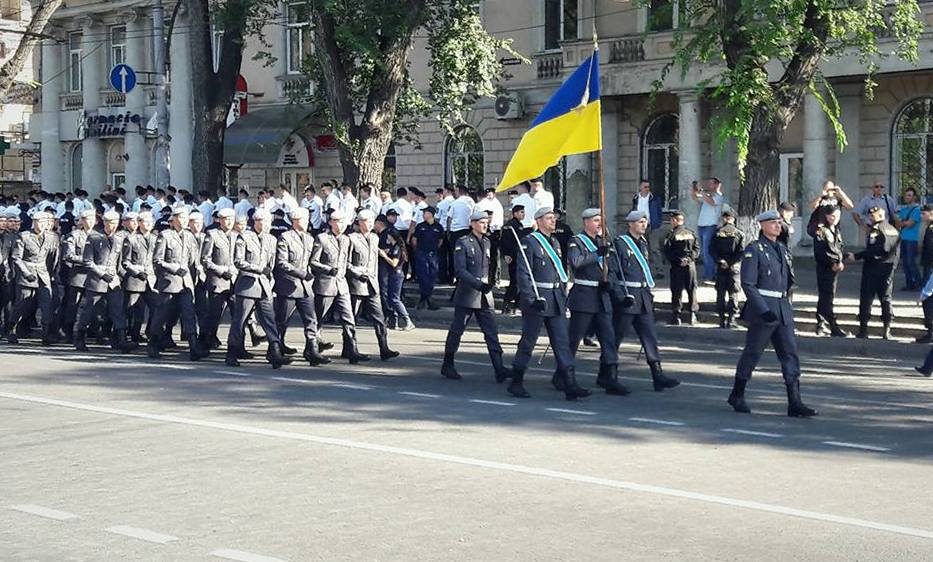
Ukrainian troops drawn from the Odesa Military Academy during the 2016 parade.

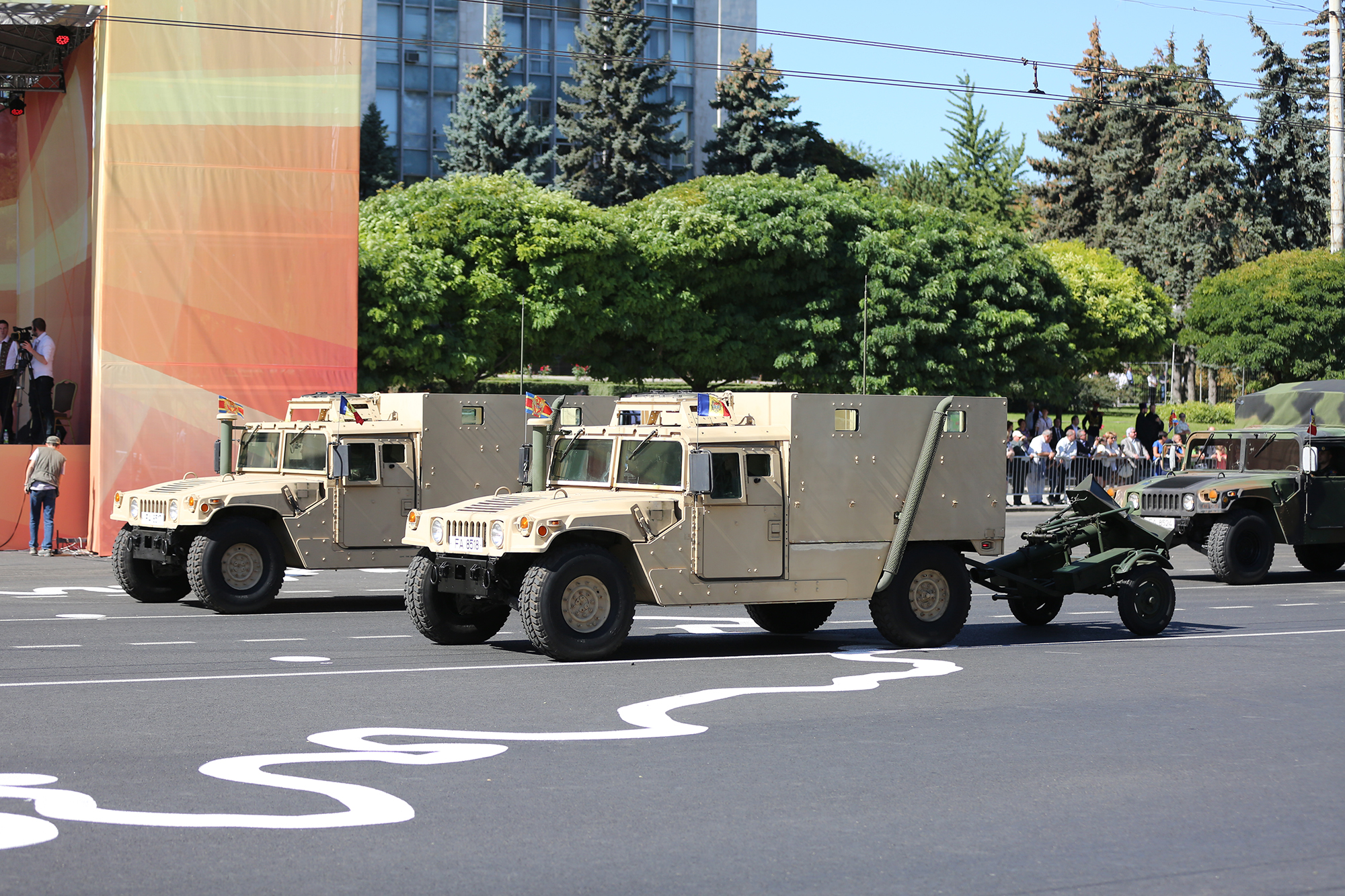
Chișinău Independence Day Parade, 2016

== See also ==
- Kyiv Independence Day Parade
- Minsk Independence Day Parade
