= Igor Cutie =

Moldovan military officer and politician (born 1968)

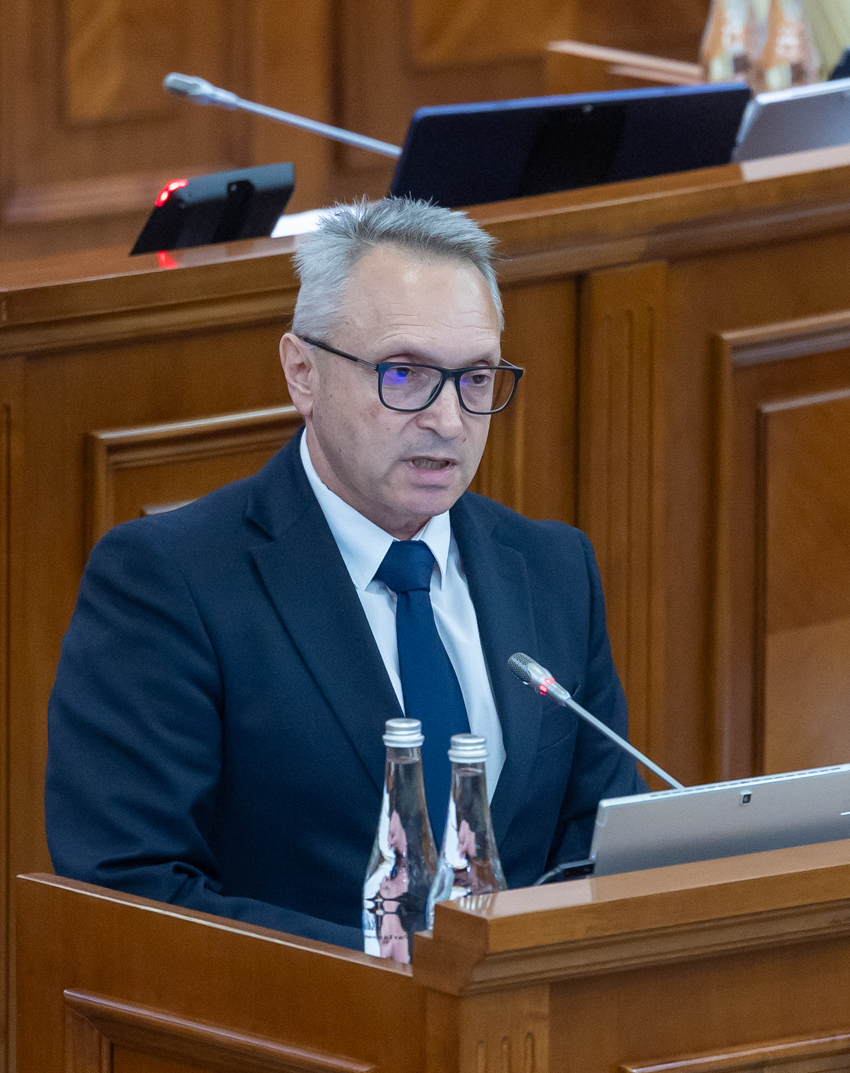

Secretary General of the Ministry of Defense
- Incumbent
- Assumed office December 14, 2021
- President: Maia Sandu

Chief of the General Staff
- In office 18 March 2016 – 1 July 2019
- President: Nicolae Timofti; Igor Dodon
- Preceded by: Igor Gorgan
- Succeeded by: Igor Gorgan

Personal details
- Born: March 12, 1968 (age 58) Ungheni, Moldavian SSR, Soviet Union

Military service
- Allegiance: Moldova
- Branch/service: Moldovan Ground Forces
- Years of service: 1989–2016
- Rank: Brigadier General
- Battles/wars: Transnistria War; Iraq War

Igor Cutie (born 12 March 1968) is a Moldovan brigadier general who served as the Chief of the General Staff of the Moldovan National Army from 2016 to 2019. He currently serves as Secretary General of the Ministry of Defense.

== Early life and education ==
Cutie was born in Ungheni on 12 March 1968. He completed his initial officer education with the Soviet Army at the Kaliningrad Military School of Engineering Troops in 1990. He began his career in the Soviet Army in 1990 as a platoon commander in Russia and worked there until 1992. He later pursued advanced military studies in Romania, graduating from the High Military Studies Academy (now the Carol I National Defence University) and the War College in Bucharest.

== Military career ==
Cutie participated in the 1992 Transnistria War, serving in the Ștefan cel Mare 2nd Motorized Infantry Brigade until 1994. From 1995 to 1997, he was a senior lecturer at the Alexandru cel Bun Military Academy. He then became a staff officer in the General Staff. During his service, Cutie held the role of Commander of the Land Forces Command and Director of the General Staff Directorate. He was also deployed to the Iraq War as a commander during post-conflict relief and reconstruction operations.

On 3 November 2016, President Nicolae Timofti signed a decree appointing Cutie as the Chief of the General Staff, succeeding Igor Gorgan following his dismissal. Defense Minister Anatol Șalaru officially introduced him to the officer corps later that day. In October 2018, Cutie represented Moldova at the Conference of Heads of Defense on Countering Violent Extremist Organizations in Washington, D.C. He was succeeded on 1 July 2019 when Igor Gorgan was reappointed to the post by President Igor Dodon.

== Later career ==
He headed the Cabinet of the Minister of Defense from August to December 2021. On 14 December 2021, he became Secretary General of the Ministry of Defense.

== Personal life ==
He speaks Romanian, Russian, and English. He is married and has two children.

== Honors and awards ==
- Order of Allegiance to the Fatherland
- Medal for Military Merit
