= Honor Guard Company (Moldova) =

Ceremonial unit in Moldova

Honor Guard Company Compania Garda de Onoare
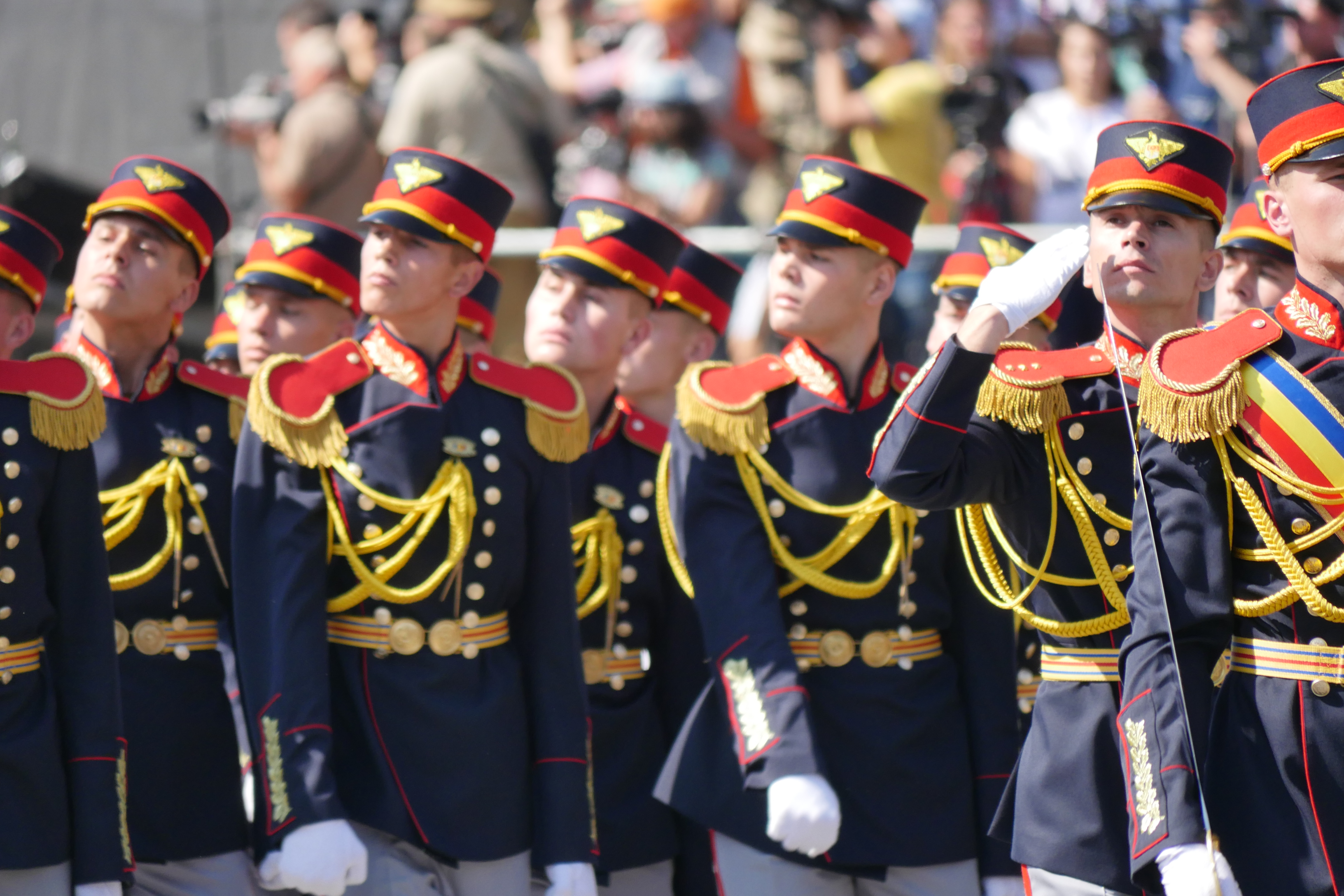
- During the Kyiv Independence Day Parade in 2018.
- Active: 22 June 1992-present
- Country: Moldova
- Branch: Moldovan Ground Forces
- Type: Honor Guard
- Role: Ceremonial Guard
- Part of: Guard Battalion
- Garrison/HQ: Military Camp 142, Chișinău
- March: Marș de Întîmpinare "La Mulți ani"

Commanders
- Commander: Captain Victor Shipilov
- Notable commanders: Major Igor Procop

Insignia
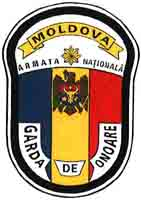
- Ceremonial Shoulder Patch (Service uniform)

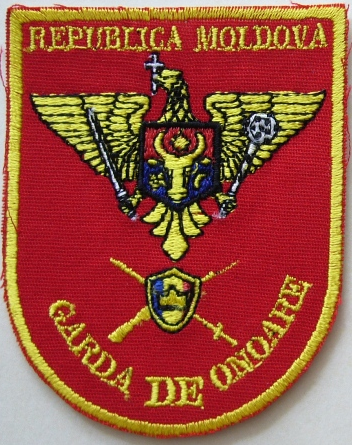
- Ceremonial Shoulder Patch (Ceremonial uniform)

The Honor Guard Company of the Moldovan National Army is an honor guard unit of the Armed Forces of the Republic of Moldova. Founded on 22 June 1992, it is part of the National Army's Guard Battalion. To be eligible for the honor guard, one should be at least 185 cm (6 ft 1 in), have strong health, and have a pleasant appearance.

== Activities ==
The unit participates in over 250 ceremonies, including the ceremonies of the appointment of foreign diplomats, and state award ceremonies and welcome ceremonies. It commonly performs military rituals on public holidays such as Victory Day, Independence Day and Liberation Day. Daily training in front and specialist training lasts for 4 hours. Currently, it is the only unit in the armed forces to utilize the goose step. In 2012, President Nicolae Timofti described it as "the Visit Card of the Republic of Moldova".

=== Parades ===
The members of the company also have participated in military parades in Romania, Bulgaria, France, Ukraine and other countries.

==== Domestic ====
In Moldova, there is one parade during which it is an active participant, the Chișinău Independence Day Parade on 27 August that takes place every 5 years.

==== Russian ====
In 2010, a 76 (70 on parade with 6 in reserve) man contingent from the company took part in the Moscow Victory Day Parade on Red Square, arriving by train days prior and staying at lodging in Naro-Fominsk and Alabino. Although there were concerns over financial difficulties in transporting the contingent, parliament speaker Marian Lupu stated nonetheless that "It is a pride for Moldova that its soldiers marched on the Red Square". It also took part in the 2020 Moscow Victory Day Parade at the same venue in honor of the war's 75th anniversary.

==== Romania ====
The unit for the first time represented the country in a parade in Romania in 2014. The parade, which was held on Great Union Day, was held through the Arcul de Triumf in central Bucharest.

==== France ====
A three-member color guard represented the country at the 2014 Bastille Day military parade in Paris. According to Vitalie Josan, the now commander of the company who was the flag bearer in while in France, the contingent from the New Zealand Defence Force assumed the uniform was not useful when worn in the field, to which he responded by revealing that it has more resistance than other field uniforms, having been tested in polygons.

==== Other ====
In 2009, it took part in a parade on Prince Alexander of Battenberg Square in Sofia, Bulgaria, leading a military band during the Bulgarian Armed Forces Day parade. The company's participation in the 2020 parade drew criticism by politicians, with former Defence Minister Anatol Salaru saying that the parade could expose the company to COVID-19. In 2018, the unit (led by Vasile Ojoga) represented Moldova at the Kyiv Independence Day Parade on Maidan Nezalezhnosti, which also saw 14 other contingents from NATO and Ukraine allied armed services. It returned to Kiev with a limited contingent in 2021 led by Captain Victor Shipilov.

=== Changing of the Guard Ceremony ===
The ceremony of the changing of the guards is performed by members of the company at the Eternity Memorial Complex in Chișinău. It is performed by three soldiers and one officer wearing their service uniform. The ceremony is done hourly and is similar to the ceremony in Moscow. Guards stand at attention in all types of weather, as well as during ceremonies such as the laying of wreaths at the monument.

== Recognition ==
After the returning from the Moscow parade in 2020 and upon returning from a two-week quarantine that followed, members of the company were awarded with army decoration by President Dodon and Defence Minister Alexandru Pînzari.

== Commanders ==
- Major Igor Procop (until circa 2010)
- Captain Vitalie Josan (? - circa 2021)
- Captain Victor Shipilov (interim) (circa 2021)

== Gallery ==
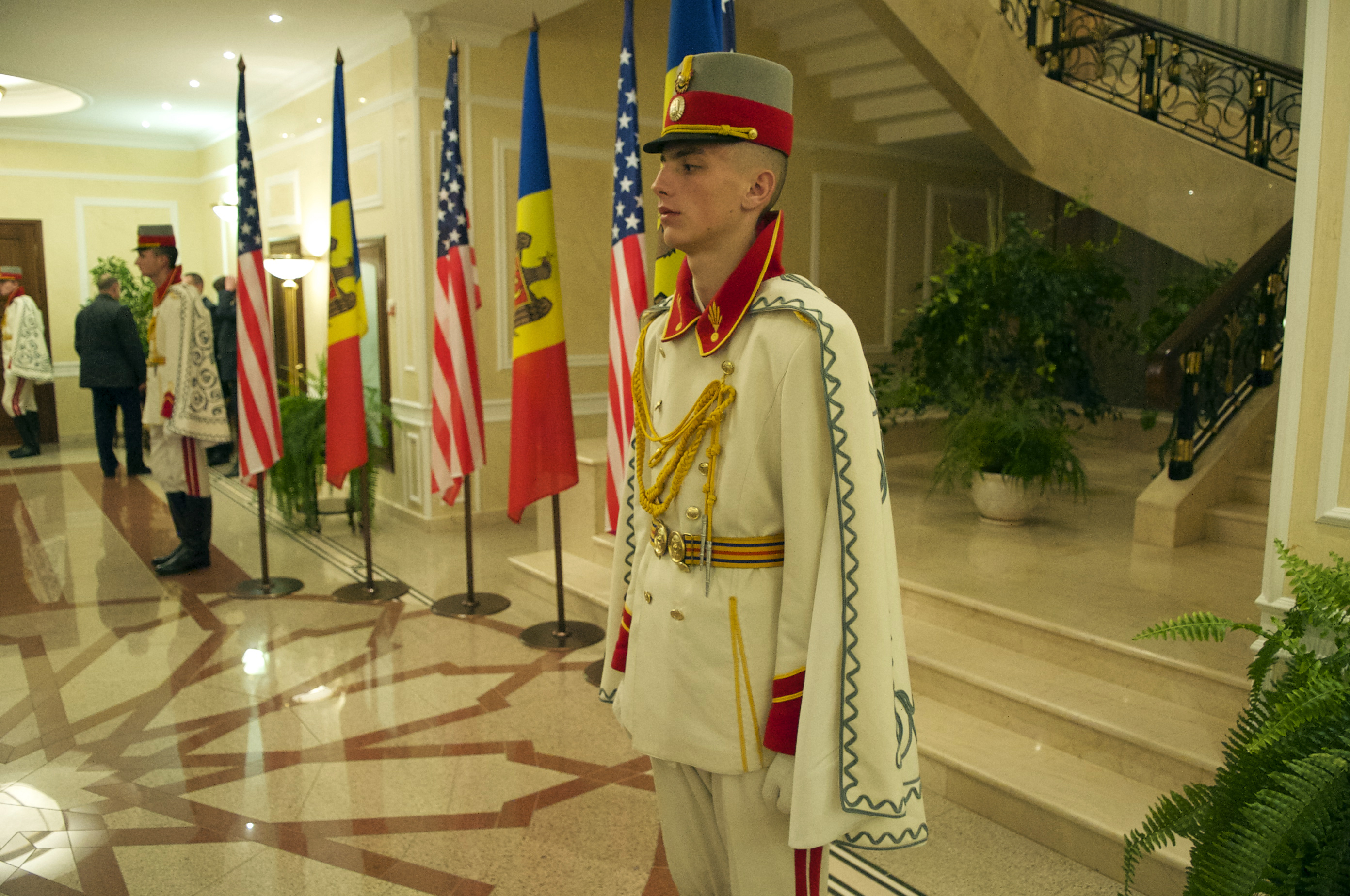
An unarmed member of the company at the Presidential Administration.

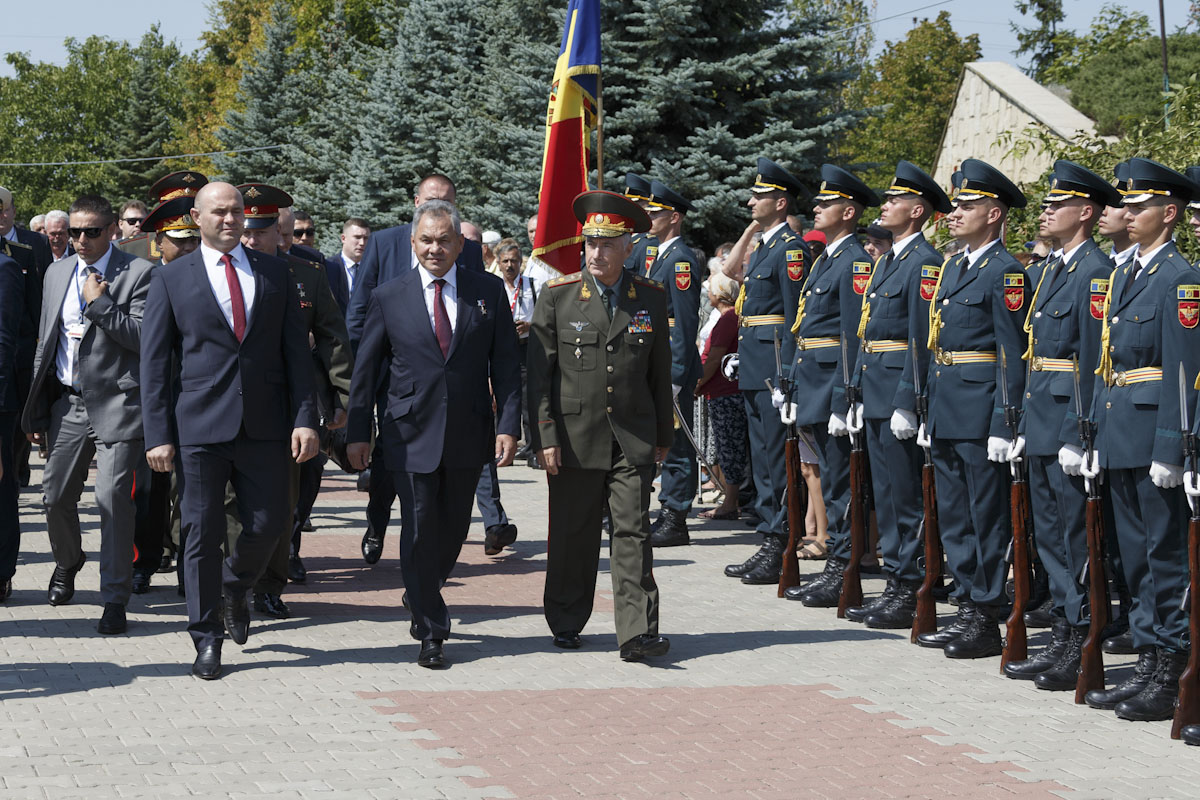
Members of the company being inspected by Sergey Shoigu, Pavel Voicu and Victor Gaiciuc during the Second Jassy–Kishinev Offensive celebrations in 2019.

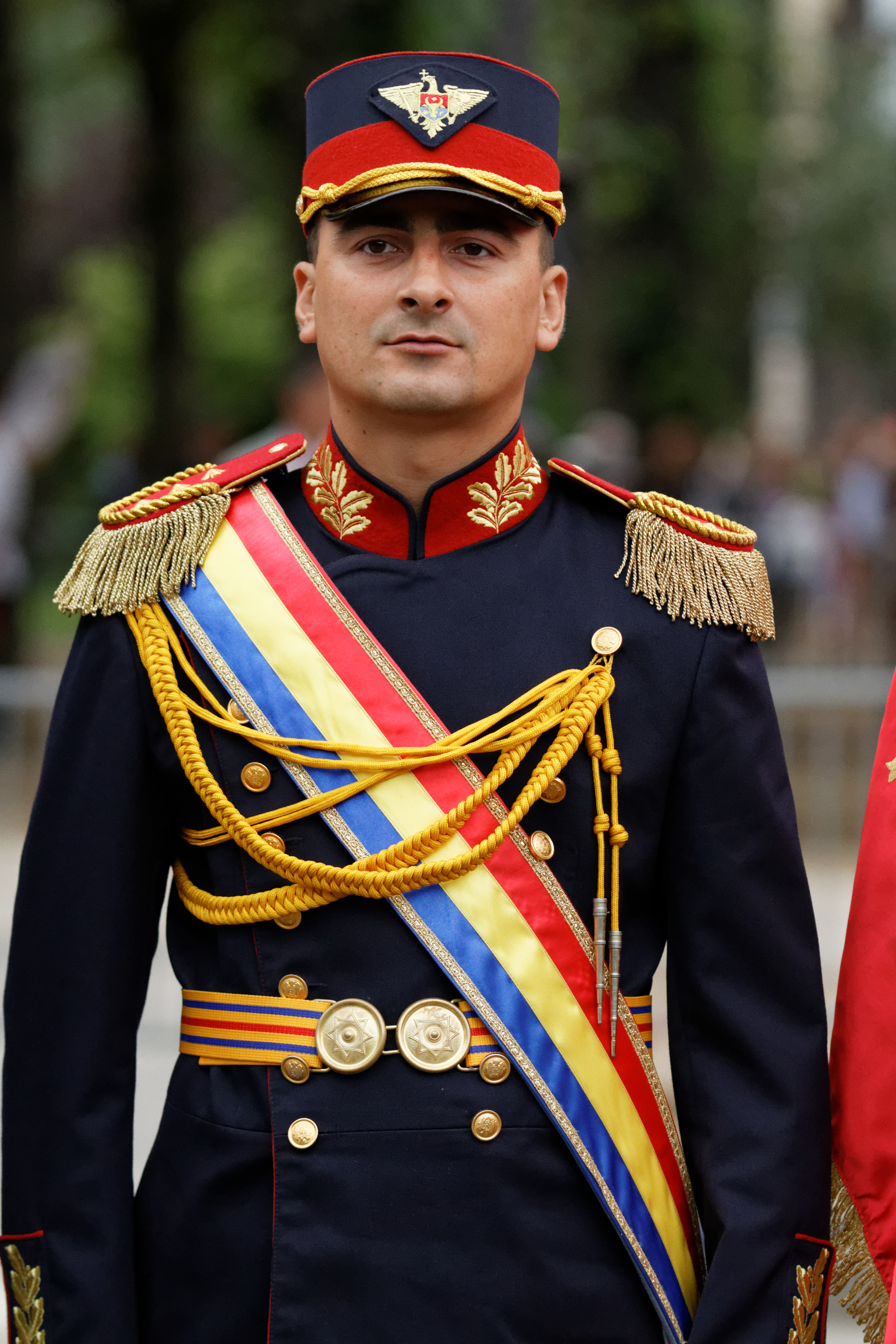
A soldier from the company during the 2014 Bastille Day military parade in Paris.

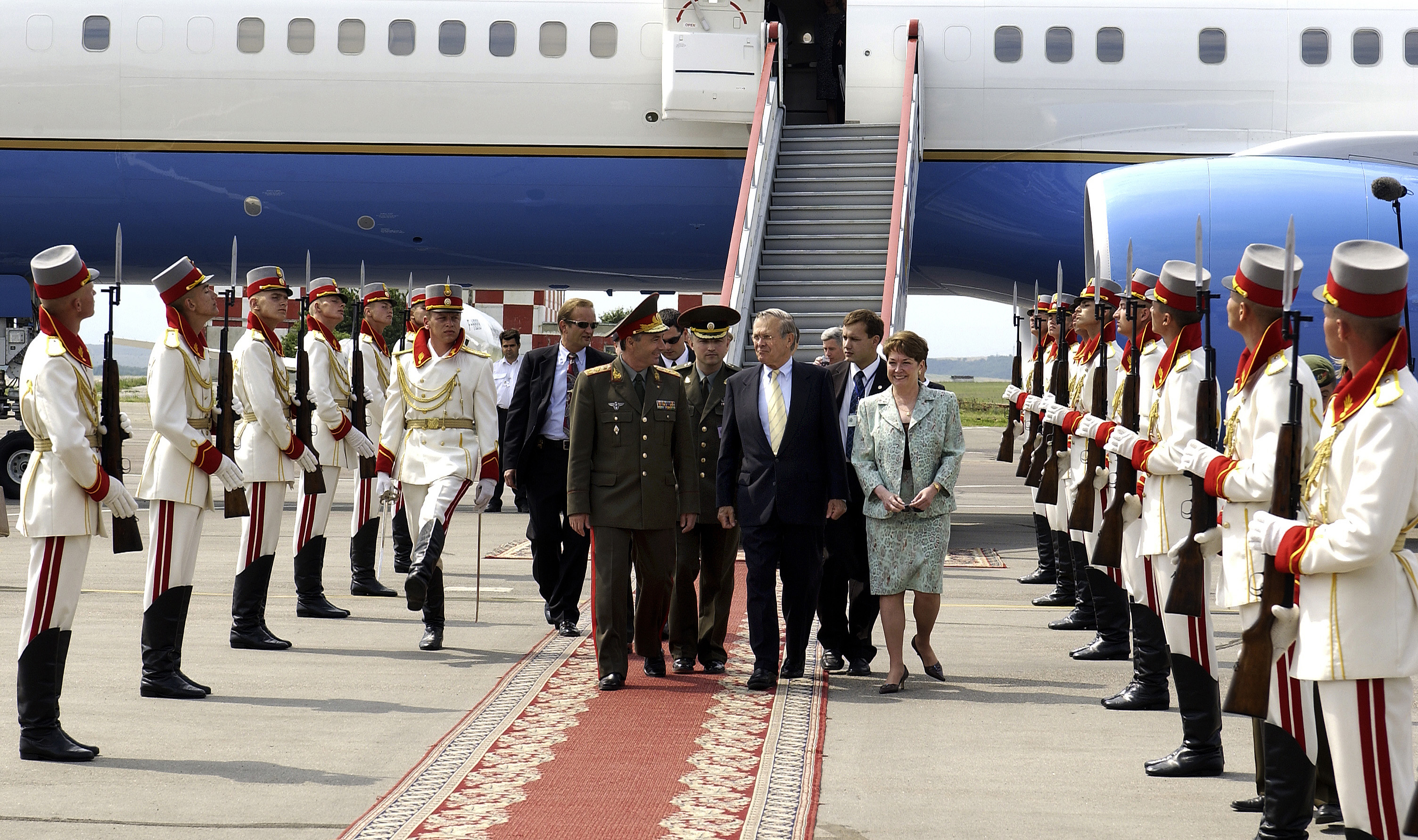
Members of the company at Chișinău International Airport.

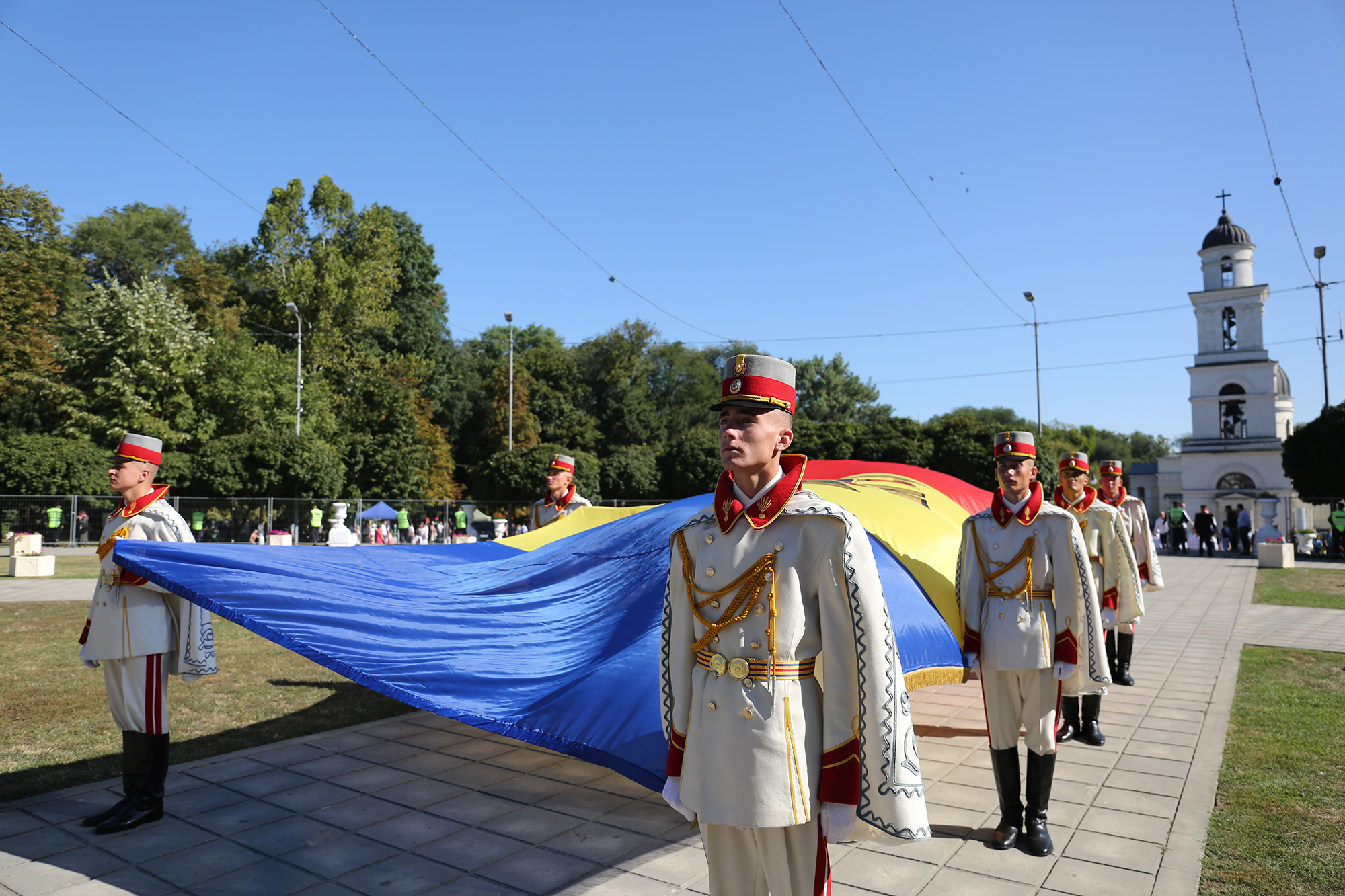
Members of the company holding a large Flag of Moldova.

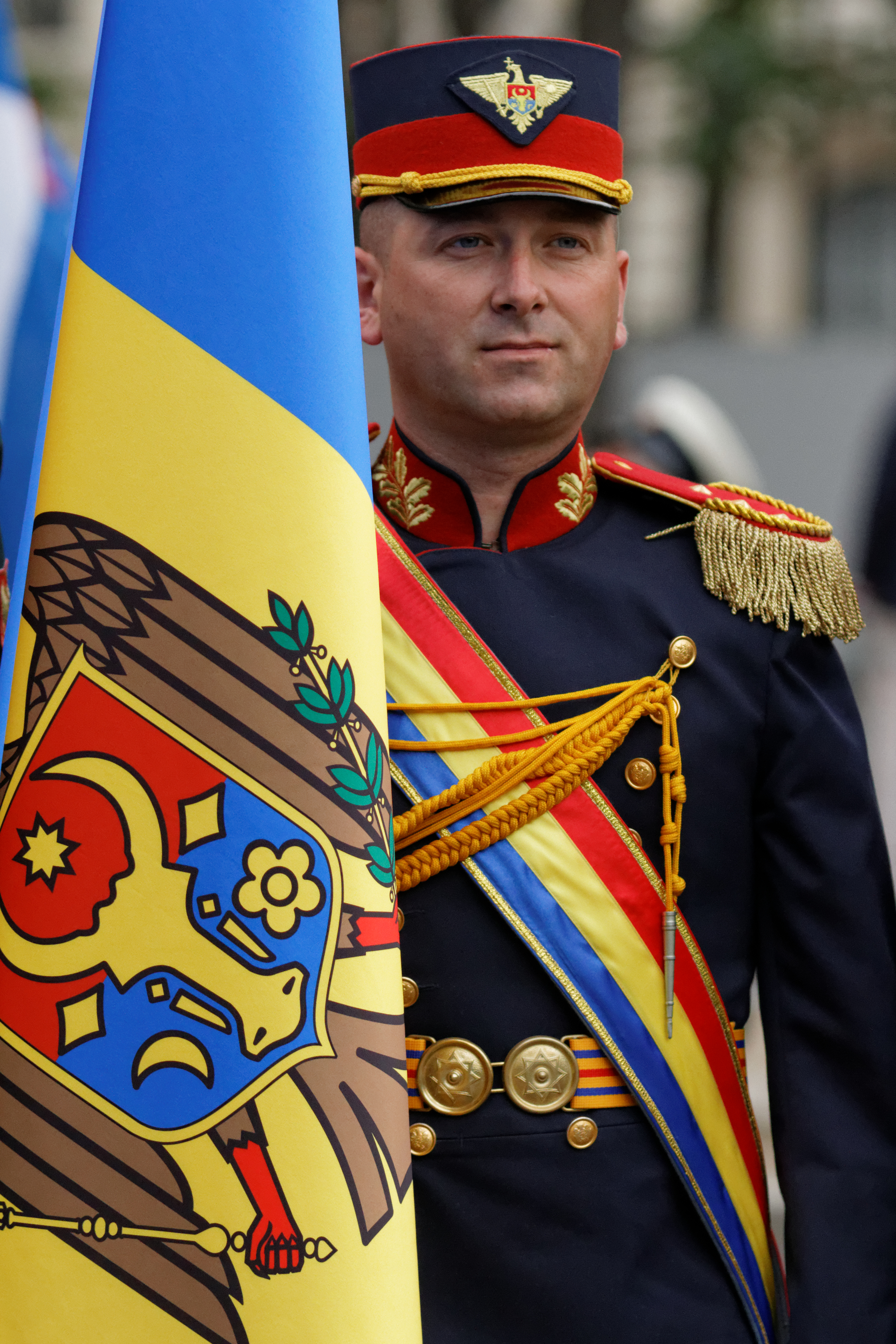
An ensign of the company in Paris.

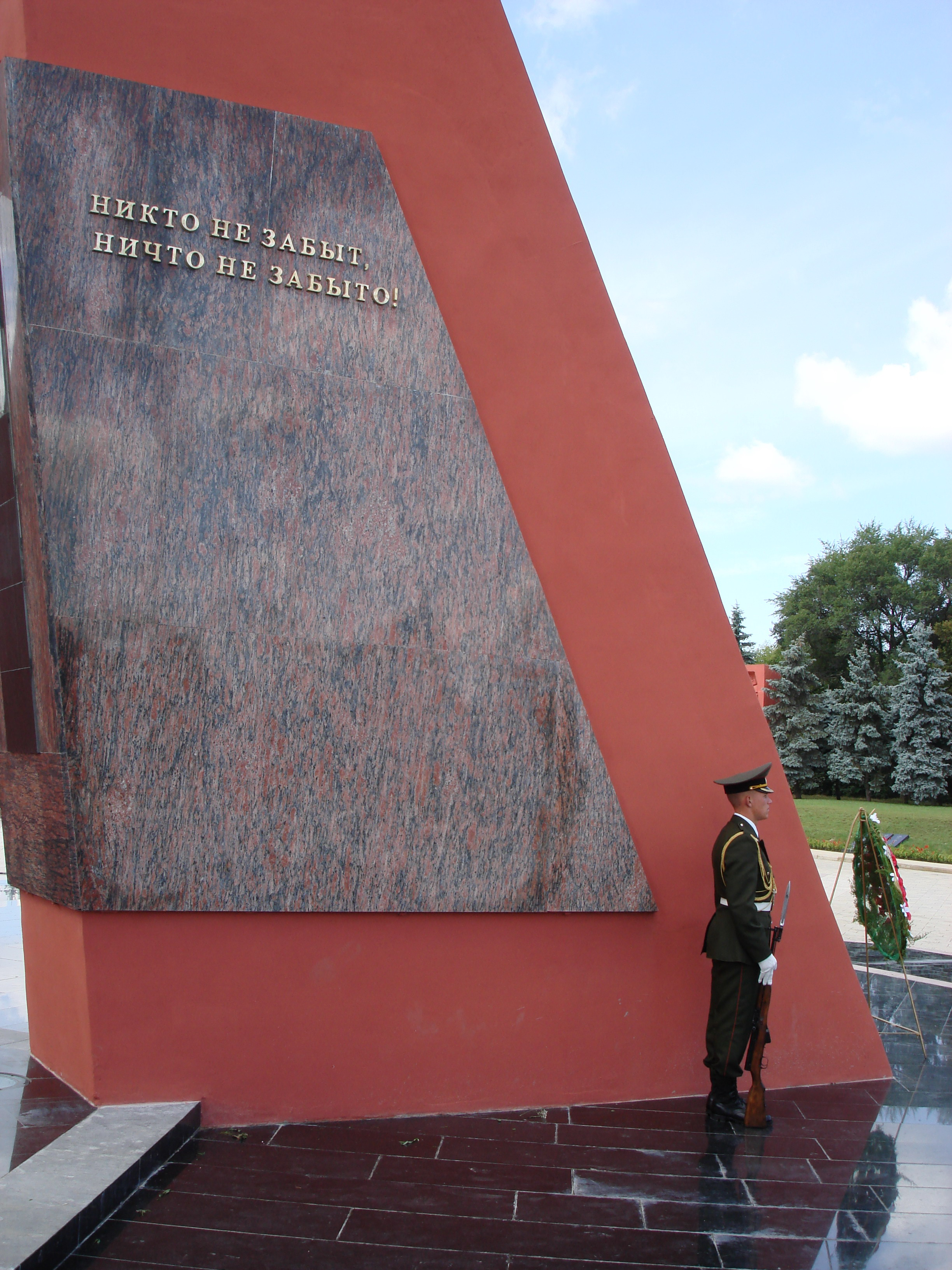
A member of the company standing guard at the memorial complex.

A video of the Moldovan honour guard during the parade in Moscow.

== See also ==
- SKS
- Honor Guard of the Armed Forces of Belarus
- Guard mounting
- Presidential Band of the Republic of Moldova
- Kyiv Presidential Honor Guard Battalion
- Michael the Brave 30th Guards Brigade
