= Moldovan Ground Forces =

Moldovan Land Force
- Romanian: Forțele Terestre ale Republicii Moldova
- Moldovan Land Forces flag
- Founded: 25 December 2008
- Country: Moldova
- Type: Army
- Role: Land warfare
- Size: 4,000
- Part of: National Army
- Headquarters: Chișinău
- Nickname: Moldovan Army
- March: Marș de Întîmpinare «La Mulți ani»
- Engagements: Transnistria War Kosovo Force MNF-I

Commanders
- Notable commanders: Brigadier General Mihail Buclis

The Moldovan Land Forces is the land armed-forces branch of the National Army of the Moldovan Armed Forces. The Moldovan Land Forces date back to the dissolution of the Soviet Union between 1991 and 1992. As of 2018 the Moldovan Land Forces consists of around 4,000 personnel.

== History ==
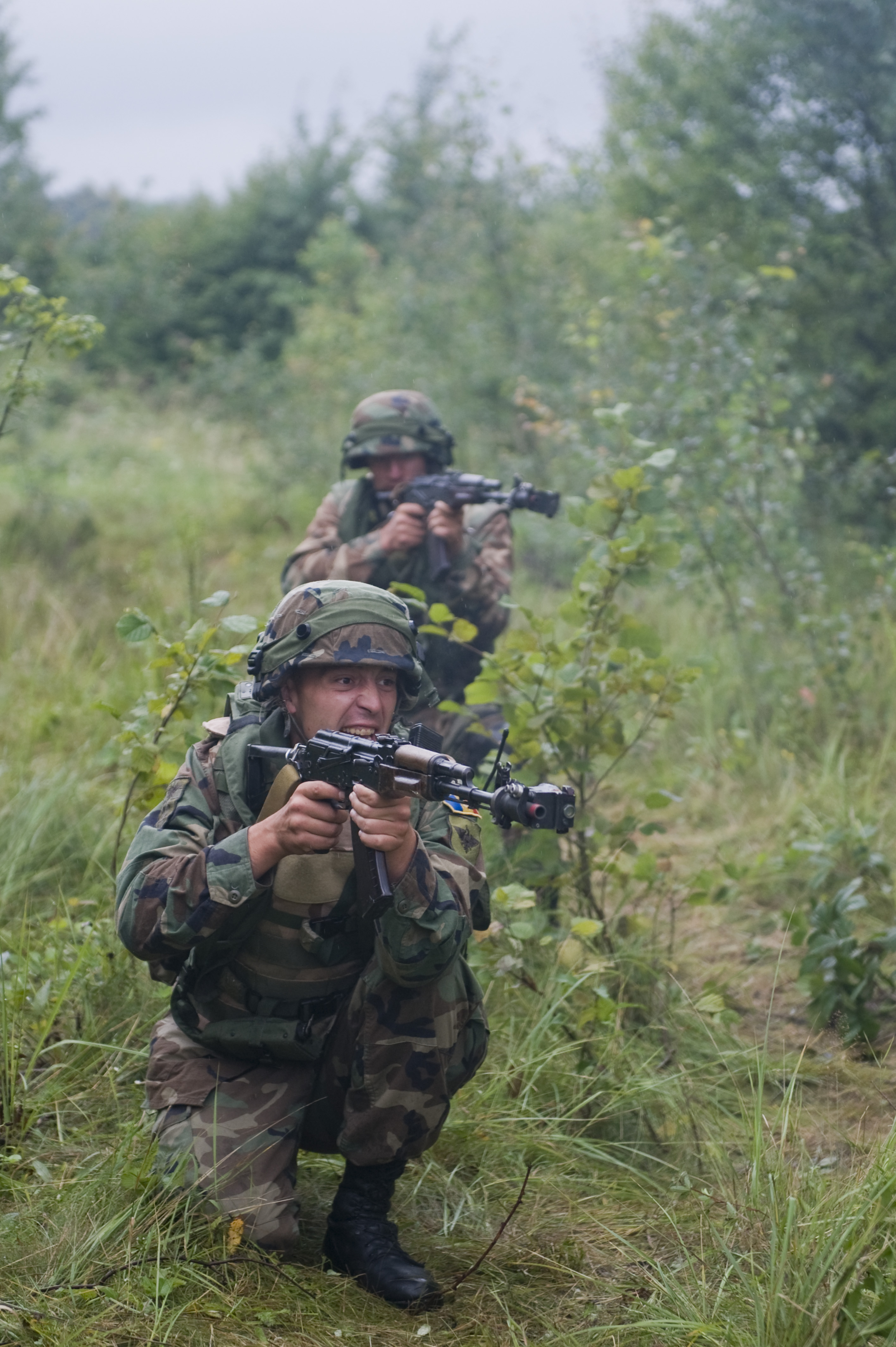
Moldovan forces train in Ukraine during Rapid Trident 2011.

At the beginning of 1994, the Moldovan army (under the Ministry of Defense) consisted of 9,800 men organized into three motorized infantry brigades, one artillery brigade, and one reconnaissance/assault battalion. Its equipment consisted of fifty-six ballistic missile defenses; seventy-seven armored personnel carriers and sixty-seven "look-alikes;" eighteen 122 mm and fifty-three 152 mm towed artillery units; nine 120 mm combined guns/mortars; seventy AT-4 Spigot, nineteen AT-5 Spandrel, and twenty-seven AT-6 Spiral anti-tank guided weapons; a 73 mm SPG-9 recoilless launcher, forty-five MT-12 100 mm anti-tank guns; and thirty ZU-23 23 mm and twelve S-60 57 mm air defense guns. Moldova has received some arms from former Soviet stocks maintained on the territory of the republic as well as undetermined quantities of arms from Romania, particularly at the height of the fighting with Transnistria.

By 2006–2007, the Army had been reduced to a strength of 5,710, including three motor rifle brigades, one artillery brigade, and independent SF and engineer battalions, plus an independent guard unit. Equipment included 44 BMD-1 AIFV, and 266 APCs, including 91 TAB-71s, as well as 227 artillery pieces. The modern Land Forces Command was established on 25 December 2008. In 2010, the Army had been further reduced to 5,148 (3,176 professional soldiers and 1,981 conscripts) plus 2,379 paramilitary forces. The reserve force consists of 66,000 troops. Equipment included 44 BMD-1P infantry fighting vehicles, 164 APCs (100 wheeled, including 89 Romanian TAB-71Ms, and 64 tracked, BTRs and MT-LBs), 148 artillery pieces (69 towed, 9 2S9 self-propelled guns, and 11 "Urugan" multiple rocket launchers); 117 Anti-tank missiles (Soviet-built AT-4s, AT-5s, and AT-6s), 138+ recoilless guns, 36 towed antitank guns and 37 towed anti-aircraft guns (23mm and 57mm).

== Structure ==
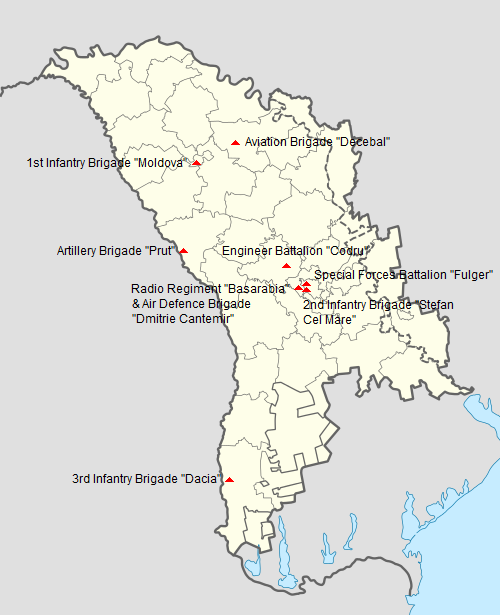
A map of military units in Moldova.

- Infantry Units:
  - 1st Motorized Infantry Brigade "Moldova" – Bălți
  - 2nd Motorized Infantry Brigade "Stefan Cel Mare" – Chișinău
  - 3rd Motorized Infantry Brigade "Dacia" – Cahul
  - 22nd Peacekeeping Battalion – Chișinău
- Artillery Division "Prut" – Ungheni
- Independent Engineer Battalion "Codru" – Negrești, Strășeni
- Independent Radio Regiment "Bessarabia" – Durleşti, Chișinău
- Independent Special Forces Battalion "Fulger" – Durlești, Chișinău
- Independent Chemical Protection Company – Negrești, Strășeni
- Guard Battalion – Chișinău
  - Ceremonial Honour Guard Company
  - Guard Company
  - Military Police Company
  - General Staff Company
  - Auto Company
  - Insurance Company
- 1st Independent Battalion of Peacekeepers – Cocieri, Dubăsari District
- 3rd Independent Battalion of Peacekeepers – Coșnița, Dubăsari District
- Independent Infantry Company of Peacekeepers – Varnița, Anenii Noi

== Gallery ==
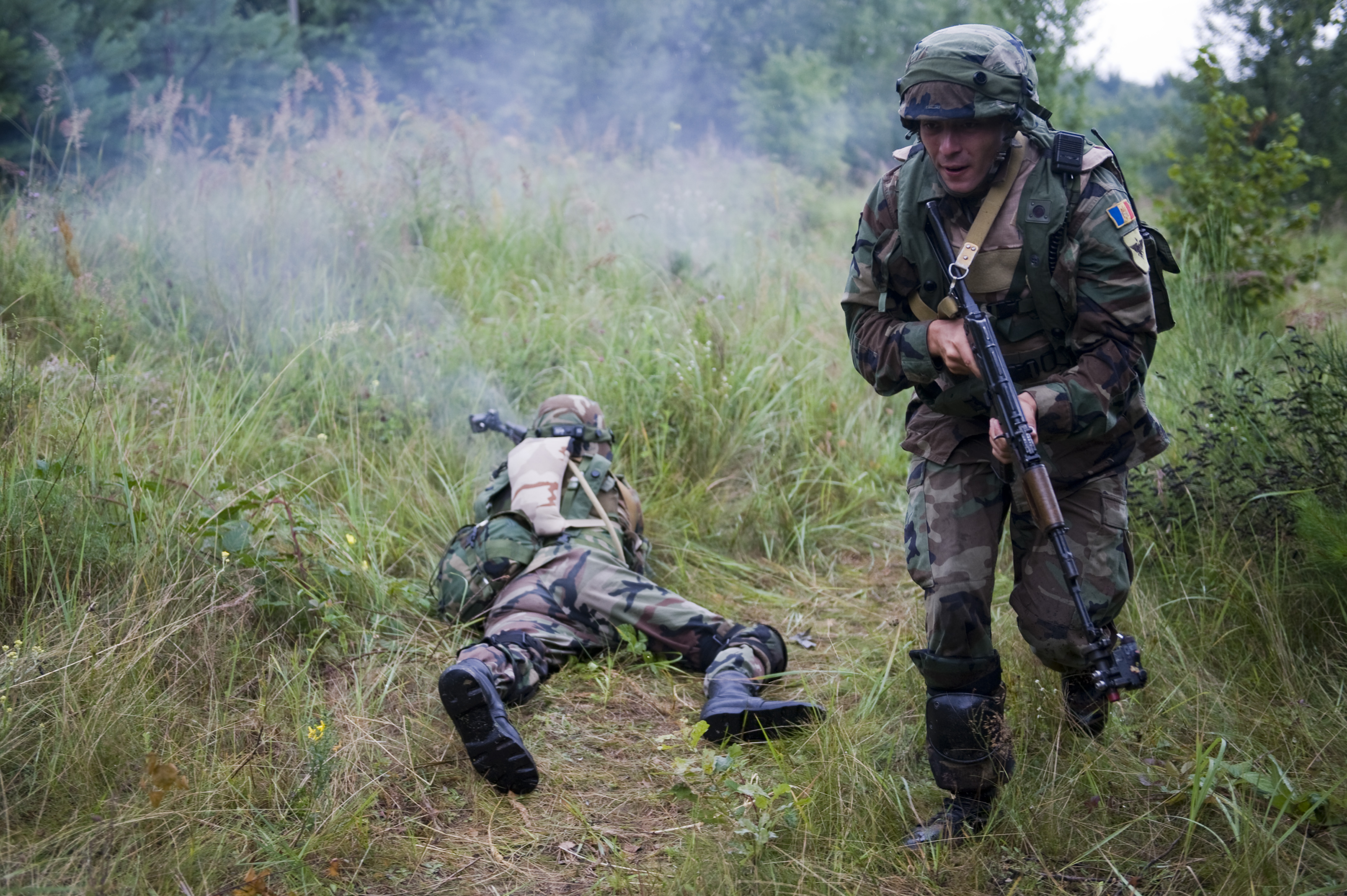
Moldovan forces during the Rapid Trident 2011.

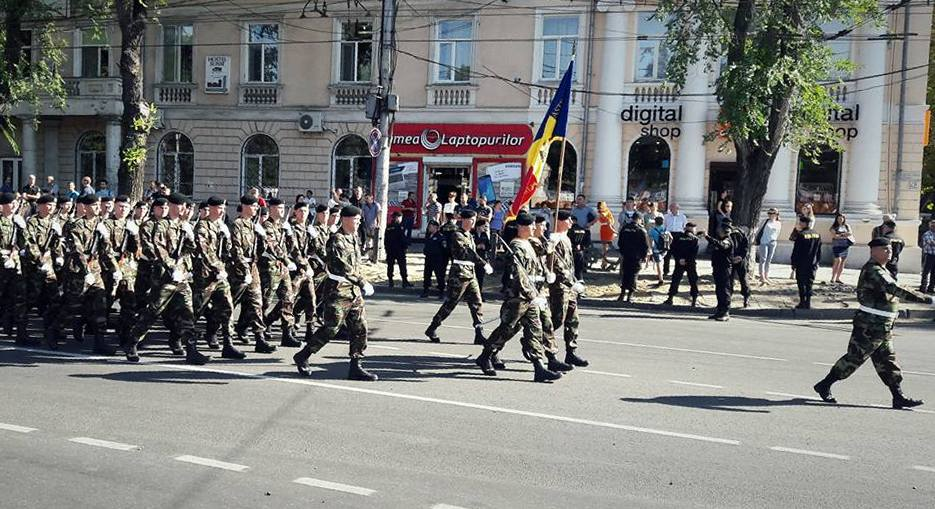
The 2nd Motorized Infantry Brigade "Stefan Cel Mare" on parade.

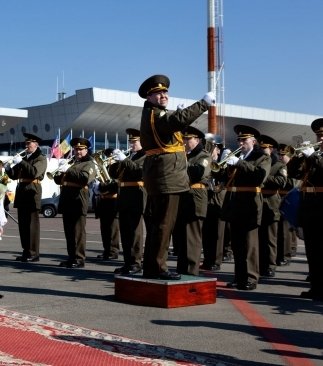
The Presidential Orchestra of the Republic of Moldova

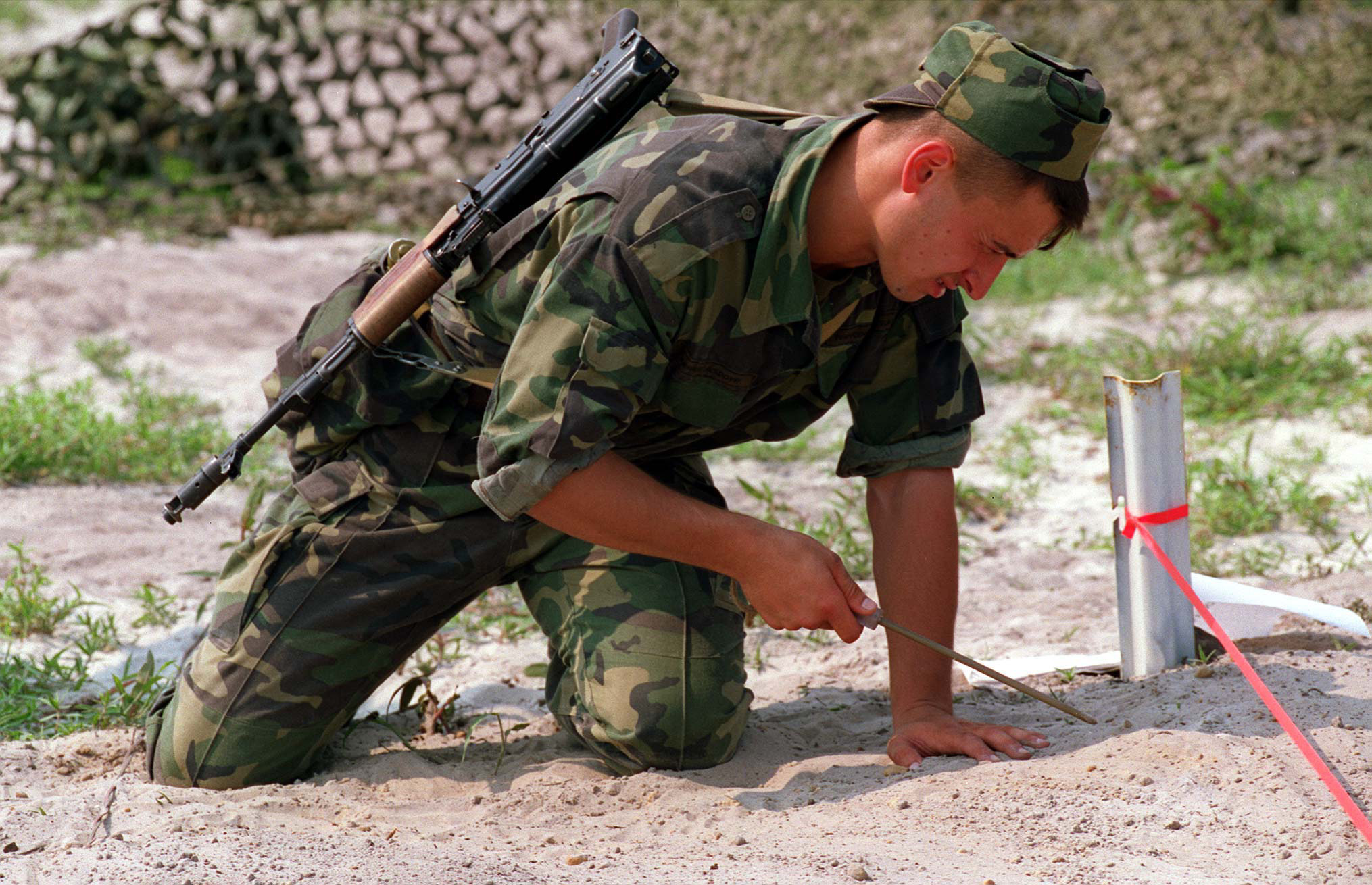
Moldovan soldier training for mine prodding

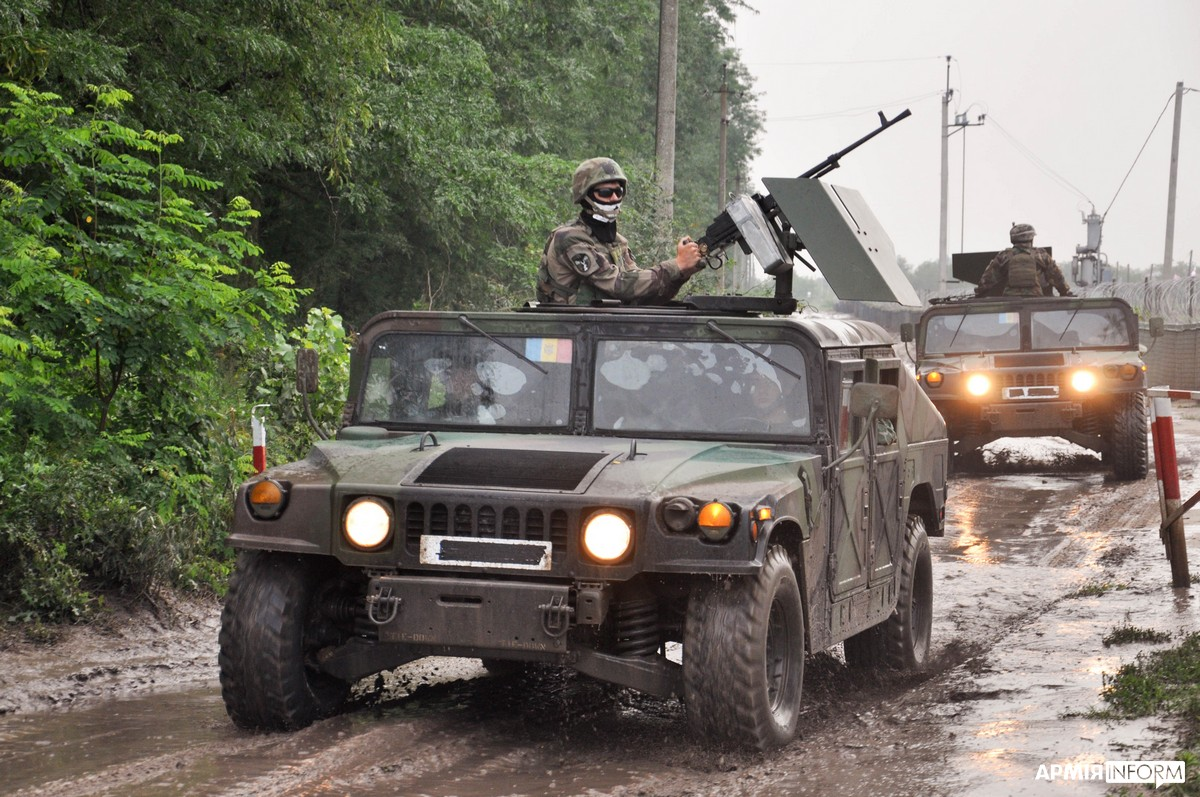
Moldovan HMMWV.

== Equipment ==
Most of the Moldovan equipment dates back to Soviet times, as expressed by Anatolie Nosatîi, the Minister of Defense. In 2023, as part of the National Army Modernization Initiative, Moldova started receiving Piranha IIIH armoured personnel carriers from Germany. Other modern equipment such as drones, laptops, surveillance radars, and explosive ordnance disposal equipment was donated by the EU, while Romania also provided helmets, bulletproof vests, and off-road vehicles.

== See also ==
- Trupele de Carabinieri (Gendarmerie-type force of the Republic of Moldova)
