= Guard Battalion =

Guard Battalion may refer to:

- Presidential Guard Battalion (Brazil)
- Guard Battalion (Estonia)
- Wachbataillon
- Guard Battalion (Moldova)
- Ceremonial Guard Battalion
- 21st Ceremonial Guard Battalion

== See also ==
- Brigade of Guards
