= Mihai Bucliș =

Mihai Dumitru Bucliș (also spelled Mihail Bucliș, born 3 July 1969) is a brigadier general and former senior leader in the Moldovan National Army.

Originally from the village of Ciuciulea om the Glodeni District, he was born on 3 July 1969. He graduated from the Soviet Army Higher Military School of Tanks and Armored Vehicles in Kyiv in 1991. In 1999, he graduated from the National Defence Academy of Ukraine in 1999 and then three years later from the Carol I High Military Studies Academy in Bucharest. He commanded the 2nd Motorized Infantry Brigade "Stefan Cel Mare" until 2009. Buclis, at the time a Colonel, served as Rector of the Alexandru cel Bun Military Academy from 2010 to 2015. He graduated from the Romanian National Defense College, in 2012. In 2015, he was made Commander of the Moldovan Land Forces. On March 17, 2020, he was promoted by Igor Dodon to brigadier general. He last served as Deputy Chief for Defense Resources of the General Staff.

He is married and has two children.
