= Independence of Moldova =

The independence of Moldova was officially recognized on 2 March 1992, when Moldova gained membership of the United Nations. The nation had declared its independence from the Soviet Union on 27 August 1991, and was a co-founder of the post-Soviet Commonwealth of Independent States. Moldova became fully independent from the Soviet Union that December, and joined the United Nations three months later.

== Background ==
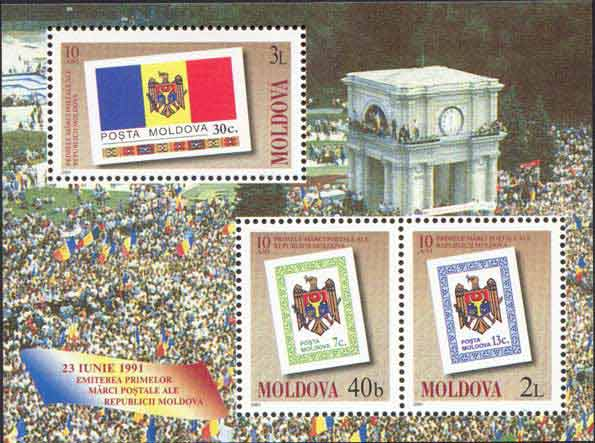
Stamps commemorating the date of 23 June 1991, the date on which the independence of the Republic of Moldova was voted and proclaimed by the Moldovan Parliament.

In the new political conditions created after 1985 by the glasnost policy introduced by Mikhail Gorbachev in 1986 to support perestroika (restructuring), a Democratic Movement of Moldova (Romanian: Mişcarea Democratică din Moldova) was formed, which in 1989 became known as the nationalist Popular Front of Moldova (FPM; Romanian: Frontul Popular din Moldova). Along with several other Soviet republics, from 1988 onwards, Moldova started to move towards independence. On 27 August 1989, the FPM organized a mass demonstration in Chişinău, that became known as the Great National Assembly (Romanian: Marea Adunare Naţională), which pressured the authorities of the Moldavian Soviet Socialist Republic to adopt a language law on 31 August 1989, that proclaimed the Moldovan language written in the Latin script to be the state language of the MSSR. Its identity with the Romanian language was also established.

The first independent elections for the local parliament were held in February and March 1991. Mircea Snegur was elected as speaker of the parliament, and Mircea Druc as prime minister. On 23 June 1990, the parliament adopted the Declaration of Sovereignty of the Soviet Socialist Republic Moldova, which, among other things, stipulated the supremacy of Moldovan laws over those of the Soviet Union. After the failure of the 1991 Soviet coup d'état attempt, on 27 August 1991, Moldova declared its independence. On 21 December of the same year, Moldova, along with most of the former Soviet republics, signed the constitutive act that formed the post-Soviet Commonwealth of Independent States (CIS). Moldova became fully independent from the Soviet Union on 25 December 1991. The following day the Soviet Union ceased to exist. Declaring itself a neutral state, it did not join the military branch of the CIS. Three months later, on 2 March 1992, the country gained formal recognition as an independent state at the United Nations. In 1994, Moldova became a member of NATO's Partnership for Peace program and also a member of the Council of Europe on 29 June 1995.

== Declaration of Independence of Moldova ==
The Declaration of Independence of the Republic of Moldova was adopted on 27 August 1991 by the Parliament of the Republic of Moldova following the dissolution of the Soviet Union. The document claims "millennial history" and "uninterrupted statehood" within historic and ethnic borders. and refers to the official language as "Romanian". This founding act of the Republic of Moldova is celebrated as the National Day or Independence Day. The Republic of Moldova would then gain official recognition of statehood on 2 March 1992, when gaining membership of the United Nations.

=== Disputed status of Transnistria ===
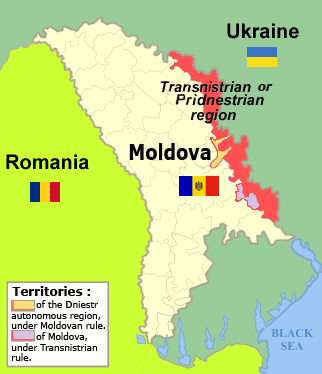
Transnistrian region of Moldova

The Moldovan Declaration of Independence clearly and directly claims Moldovan sovereignty over the territory of Transnistria as "a component part of the historical and ethnic territory of our people". This caused controversy, since that region had declared independence from the Moldovan SSR in 1990 and formed the Pridnestrovian Moldavian Soviet Socialist Republic (PMSSR); however, the PMSSR had not been recognised as a legitimate Soviet republic by either the Soviet Union or the Moldovan SSR.

However, the Moldovan Declaration of Independence is itself used as an argument against Moldovan sovereignty over Transnistria as it denounces the agreement of 23 August 1939, between the government of the Soviet Union and the government of Nazi Germany, the only formal mention of the union between the two territories, "null and void".

== See also ==
- Disputed status of Transnistria
- Dissolution of the Soviet Union
- Independence Day of the Republic of Moldova
- Transnistrian Declaration of Independence
