= Public holidays in Moldova =

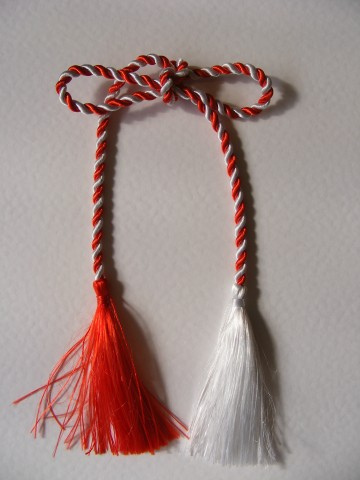
Mărțișor, an informal spring holiday celebrated in Moldova and Romania

Public holidays in the Republic of Moldova refer to the celebrated non-working days established by the Government of Moldova and valid for the whole territory of the country. Autonomous territorial units Gagauzia and Transnistria, as well cities, communes and cantonal authorities also establish local holidays, which are, however, not non-working days. There are 14 nationally celebrated holidays in the modern Moldova. Most holidays celebrated in the Republic of Moldova recognize events or people from Moldovan history. Most retail businesses close on New Year's and Independence Day, but remain open on all other holidays. Private businesses often observe only the big holidays such as the New Year's Day, Easter Monday, Victory Day, Independence Day, Labour Day, Romanian Language Day and Christmas.

The holiday season in the winter traditionally ran between New Year's Day until Old New Year. As of 2009, the holiday season now officially begins with Western Christmas on 25 December, now a legal holiday in the Republic of Moldova. The holiday seasons gets underway much earlier with the official lighting of the capital city Chișinău's Christmas tree at the end of November or very beginning of December, when other than Christmas, some locals celebrate Winter solstice, Hanukkah, and Kwanzaa. The Summer holiday season traditionally (though unofficially) starts in May with celebrations of anniversary of most important localities (Bălți, 22 May) and culminates in the end of August with the celebrations of the Independence Day and the National Language Day.

== National holidays ==
These holidays are designated by the Government of the Republic of Moldova, in accordance with the legislation of the country.IT

Date	Official name	Remarks
1 January	New Year's Day	Celebrates beginning of the Gregorian calendar year. Festivities include counting down to midnight (12:00 AM) on the preceding night, New Year's Eve. Traditional beginning of holiday season.
7-8 January	Orthodox Christmas	
8 March	International Women's Day	
April/May	Orthodox Easter	
April/May	Easter of Blajini	
1 May	Labour Day	
9 May	Europe Day	Celebrating peace and unity in Europe.
1 June	Children's Day	It commemorates the Children's Day.
27 August	Independence Day	It commemorates the founding of the Declaration of Independence of Moldova.
31 August	National Language Day	It commemorates the national language of Moldova, the Romanian language.
25 December	Christmas Day	

== Other observances ==
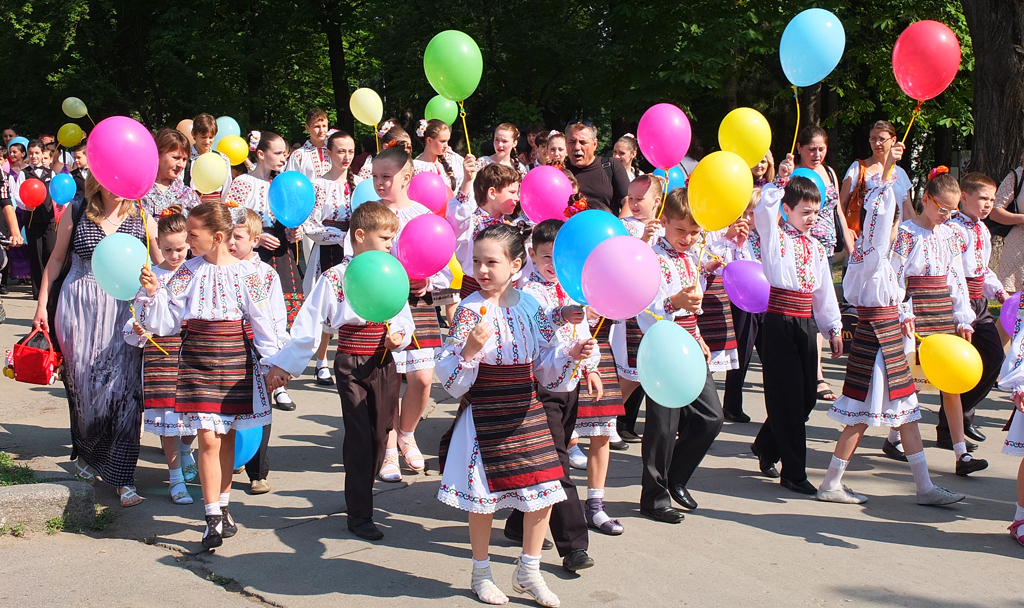
International Children's Day celebrations in Chișinău, 2012

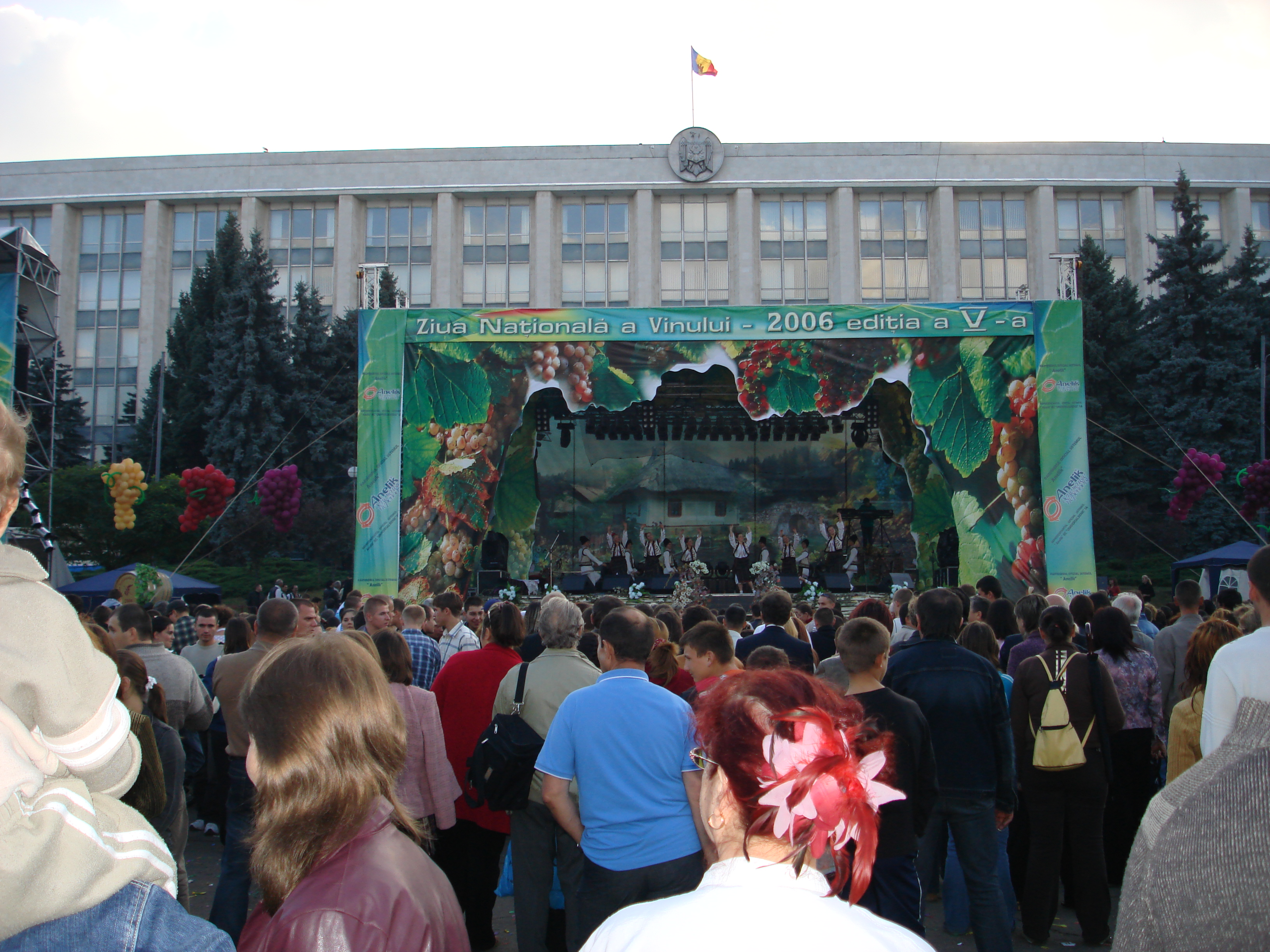
A concert in honor of the National Wine Day in 2006

In addition to the holidays, mentioned above, the following days are observed:

Date	Official name	Notes
15 February	Afghan War Veterans Day	It commemorates the end of the Soviet–Afghan War.
27 April	Flag Day	It commemorates the adoption of the Flag of Moldova.
10 June	Border Guards Day	It commemorates the founding of the Moldovan Border Police.
23 June	Sovereignty Day	It commemorates the founding of the Declaration of Sovereignty of Moldova.
29 July	Constitution Day	It commemorates the adoption of the Constitution of Moldova.
24 August	Liberation Day	It celebrates the end of the Second Jassy–Kishinev offensive. It is also celebrated in neighboring Romania as the Liberation from Fascist Occupation Day.
3 September	National Army Day	It commemorates the founding of the Moldovan Armed Forces.
8 October	National Wine Day	It commemorates the production of Moldovan wine.
18 December	Police Day	It commemorates the founding of the Moldovan Police Forces

== Local holidays ==
In addition to the national holidays, cities, communes and cantonal authorities observe the following holidays:

Date	Official name	Remarks
22 May	Bălți Day	Public holiday just for Bălți
28 June	Gagauzia Liberation Day	Public holiday just for Gagauzia.
14 October	Capital's Day	Public holiday just for Chișinău.
21 November	Cahul Day	Public holiday just for Cahul.

== See also ==
- Public holidays in Romania
- Public holidays in Transnistria
