= Asociația Tradiția Militară =

- Founded: 2004
- Location: Romania
- Period: 19th–20th century
- Earliest year portrayed: 1806
- Latest year portrayed: 1947

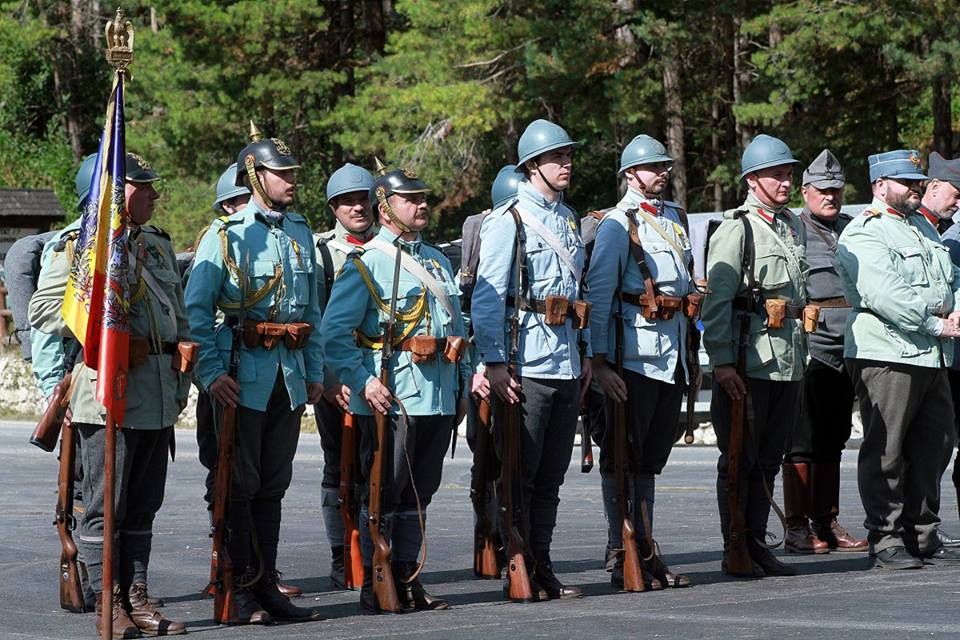
The unit in October 2016.

The Asociația Tradiția Militară (English: Military Tradition Association) or ATM is a Romanian reenactment group affiliated with the Romanian Land Forces. It was founded by history enthusiasts in 2004.

ATM cultivates the traditions of the following 12 prestigious Romanian military units:

- 2nd Vânători Guards Regiment "Queen Elisabeta"
- 1st Vânători de Munte Battalion
- 1st Grăniceri Guards Regiment
- 4th Paratroopers Battalion
- Royal Guard Battalion
- Marine Infantry Regiment
- 4th Dorobanți Regiment "Argeș"
- IV Line Infantry Regiment No.21 "Ilfov"
- Aerostation Battalion
- Bucharest Military Firefighter Company
- 2nd Wallach Grenz Regiment "Năsăud"
- 4th Roșiori Guard Regiment "Queen Maria"
- Mounted Guard Regiment

It represents Romania at the European Union of Historical-Military Associations.

== Events ==
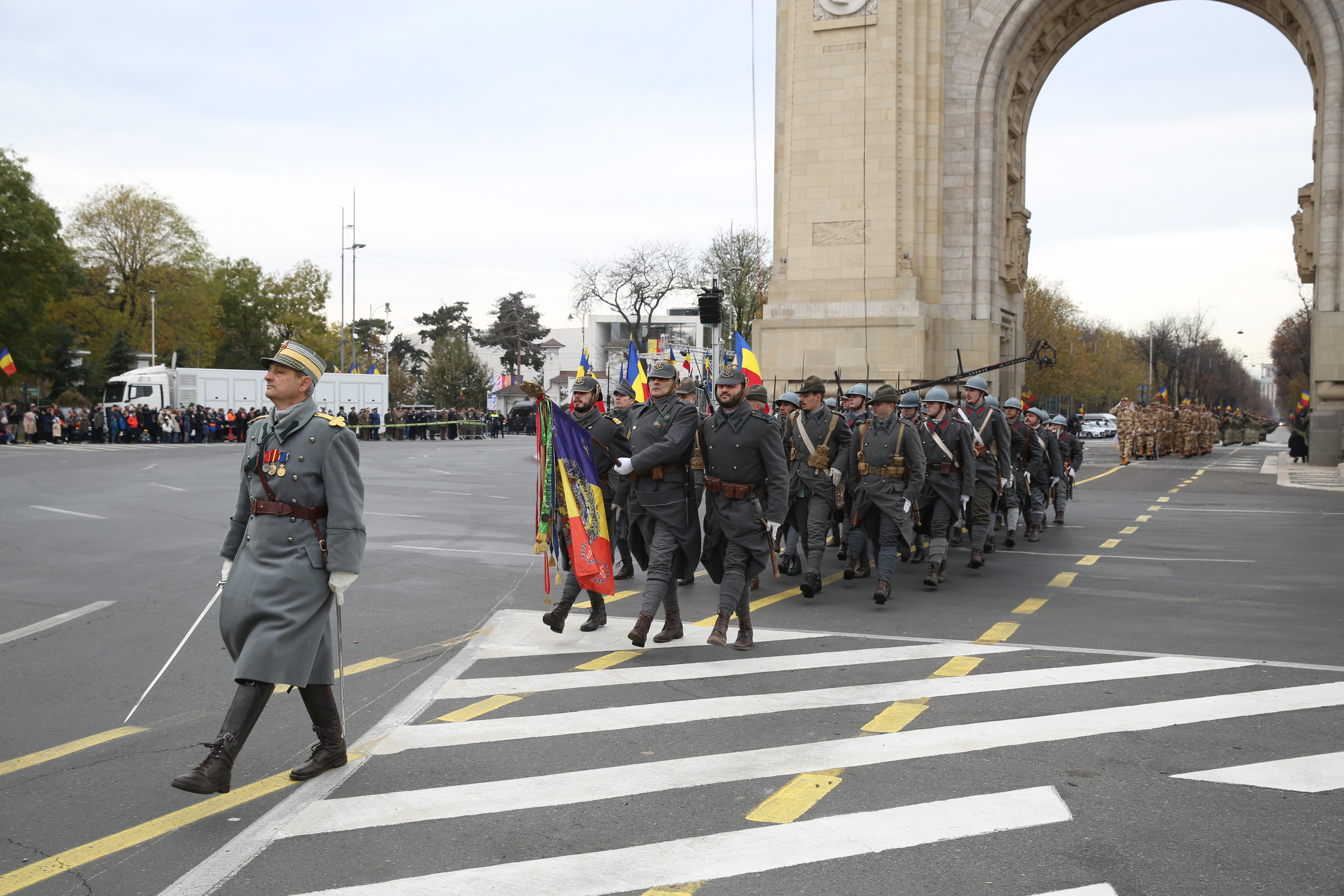
The unit participating in the 2023 Great Union Day parade in Bucharest

It carried out together with the Michael the Brave 30th Guards Brigade, the depositing of urns with soil at the Tomb of the Unknown Soldier, brought by the ATM from the places where Romanian soldiers have been killed. It has also done military guard service at Elisabeta Palace on solemn occasions.

=== Parades ===
It has annually participated in the military parade of the Romanian Armed Forces organized on the occasion of Great Union Day under the Arcul de Triumf, first taking part in this event in 2009. In 2016, it took part the Chișinău Independence Day Parade on Great National Assembly Square. It has also marched in ceremonies in 9 foreign countries: France (Verdun), Italy, Germany, Austria, the Czech Republic, Hungary, Bulgaria (Tutrakan), Ukraine (Sevastopol) and Russia (Volgograd).

== Honors ==
The ATM was decorated with:

- Commemorative Medal "Centenary of the War for the Integrity of the Nation (President of Romania)
- Royal Medal for Loyalty (Royal House of Romania)
- Emblem of Honor (Chief of the Romanian General Staff)
- Honorary Medal "Commemorative Year of the Makers of the Great Union 1918-2018 (Patriarch of the Romanian Orthodox Church)

== See also ==
- Fort Henry Guard
- List of historical reenactment groups
