= Guard Battalion (Moldova) =

Moldovan army unit

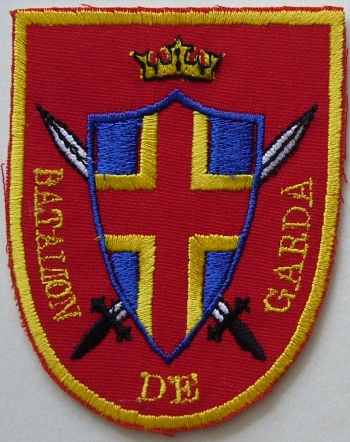
The shoulder patch of the guards.

The Guard Battalion (Romanian: Batalionul de Gardă) of the Moldovan National Army is a unit in the Moldovan Ground Forces. It is based in the capital of Chișinău, specifically at Military Camp 142. The battalion was formed on October 16, 1992. It shares the same birthday as the Independent Engineer Battalion "Codru" and the Communications and Informatics Center.

It contributes to the qualitative training of the troops and to the technical assurance of the operations carried out by the National Army. Many officers and non-commissioned officers in the battalion are on duty 24 hours a day in the Guard Battalion, as well as in other units. It primarily ensures the conduct of protocol activities of the Ministry of Defence and state institutions, as well as the protection of major objectives. These soldiers participate in solemnities during state visits to Chișinău by high-ranking foreign dignitaries.

== Structure ==
The unit has the following structure:

- Honour Guard Company
- Guard Company
- Military Police Company
- General Staff Company
- Auto Company
- Insurance Company

60 percent of the soldiers of the Guard Battalion are on a military contract. The Honour Guard Company, which was three and a half months old at the time of its absorption into the battalion, was referred to in 2012 by President Nicolae Timofti as "the Visit Card of the Republic of Moldova". It participates in over 250 ceremonies, including the ceremonies of the appointment of foreign diplomats, and state award ceremonies and welcome ceremonies.
