= Presidential Band of the Republic of Moldova =

Ceremonial unit in Moldova

Presidential Band of the Republic of Moldova Orchestra prezidențială a Republicii Moldova
- Active: 7 November 1992-present
- Country: Moldova
- Branch: Moldovan National Army
- Type: Military Band
- Size: 110
- Garrison/HQ: Chișinău
- Decorations: Emeritus Artistic Collective (2017)

Commanders
- Commander: Captain Ion Coretchi

The Presidential Band of the Republic of Moldova (Romanian: Orchestra prezidențială a Republicii Moldova, OPRM) is an artist collective and the senior most military band of the Armed Forces of the Republic of Moldova (also under the Moldovan National Army), specifically serving the president of Moldova in his/her position as commander in chief. The band plays at welcome ceremonies of foreign officials on state visits, ceremonies of national importance, military parades, the accreditation ceremonies for ambassadors to Moldova, and various community events. The band, which currently consists of 110 musicians, has performed in international festivals and military tattoos in Germany, Russia, Belgium and Romania.

== History ==
The band was formed on 7 November 1992, as a successor to the combined bands of the Soviet Army's Kishinev Garrison in the Moldovan SSR. It was originally named the Band of the Ministry of Defense of Moldova, but it changed its name by order of President Mircea Snegur in 1994. A new uniform was also sanctioned in August 1997. Instrumentalists from the Presidential Band as well as from the unit bands of the 1st, 2nd, and 3rd Motorized Infantry Brigades took in the "Musikparade-2017" tattoo in Germany. It participated in a similar event in Berlin the year prior. Female musicians have slowly been integrated into the band is made up of 90 percent of men.

== Recognition ==
It celebrated its golden jubilee in 2017, receiving congratulations from Defense Minister Eugen Sturza and presenting a concert to Sturza and veterans of the band. On its 26th anniversary in 2018, President Igor Dodon presented awards and honorary diplomas to eleven musicians in the band, wishing them "courage and perseverance in the activities they carry out with dignity". The Ministry of Defense have also in previous year granted military ranks and decorated to several members of the band, particularly the "Cross for Merit" (class III) and the Cross "For Impeccable Service" in regards to the latter.

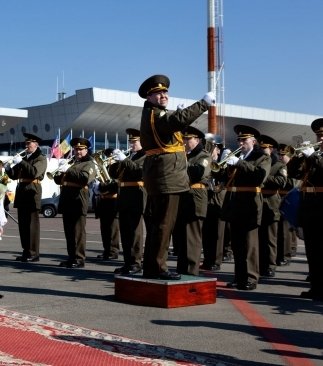
The band during the official visit of Joe Biden to Moldova in March 2011.

== List of directors ==
- Colonel Nicolae Babin (1992-)
- Colonel Leonid Vozniuc (2010 - 2021)
- Captain Ion Coretchi (2021 - Present)

== Ceremonial music ==
Title	Author
Marș de Întîmpinare	
Marș de Întîmpinare «La Mulți ani»	
Marș de Întîmpinare «Ștefan cel Mare»	
Marș Jubilar	
Marș «Pe plai Moldav»	
Marșul Voluntarilor	
Marș de Defilare	Gheorghe Butuc

== See also ==
- Honor Guard Company (Moldova)
- Band of the Department of Carabinier Troops
