= Independence Day of the Republic of Moldova =

National day of Moldova

Independence Day Ziua Independenței
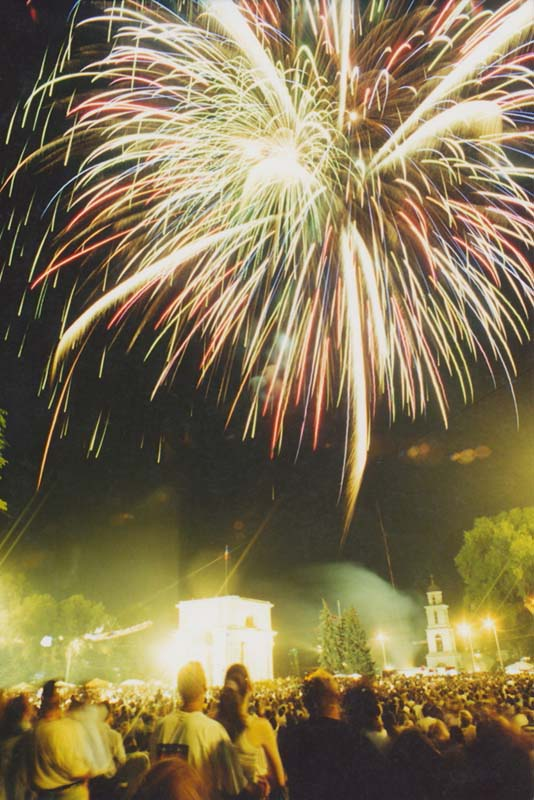
- Fireworks in Chișinău on Independence Day in 2003
- Official name: Ziua Independenței
- Observed by: Moldova
- Type: National
- Significance: The day the Moldovan Declaration of Independence was adopted by the Parliament of the Republic of Moldova
- Celebrations: Fireworks, concerts, parades
- Date: 27 August
- Next time: 27 August 2027
- Frequency: annual
- First time: 1991; 35 years ago
- Related to: Declaration of Independence

Independence Day (Romanian: Ziua Independenței) is the national day of Moldova, commemorating the adoption of the Moldovan Declaration of Independence from the Soviet Union on 27 August 1991.

== Background ==
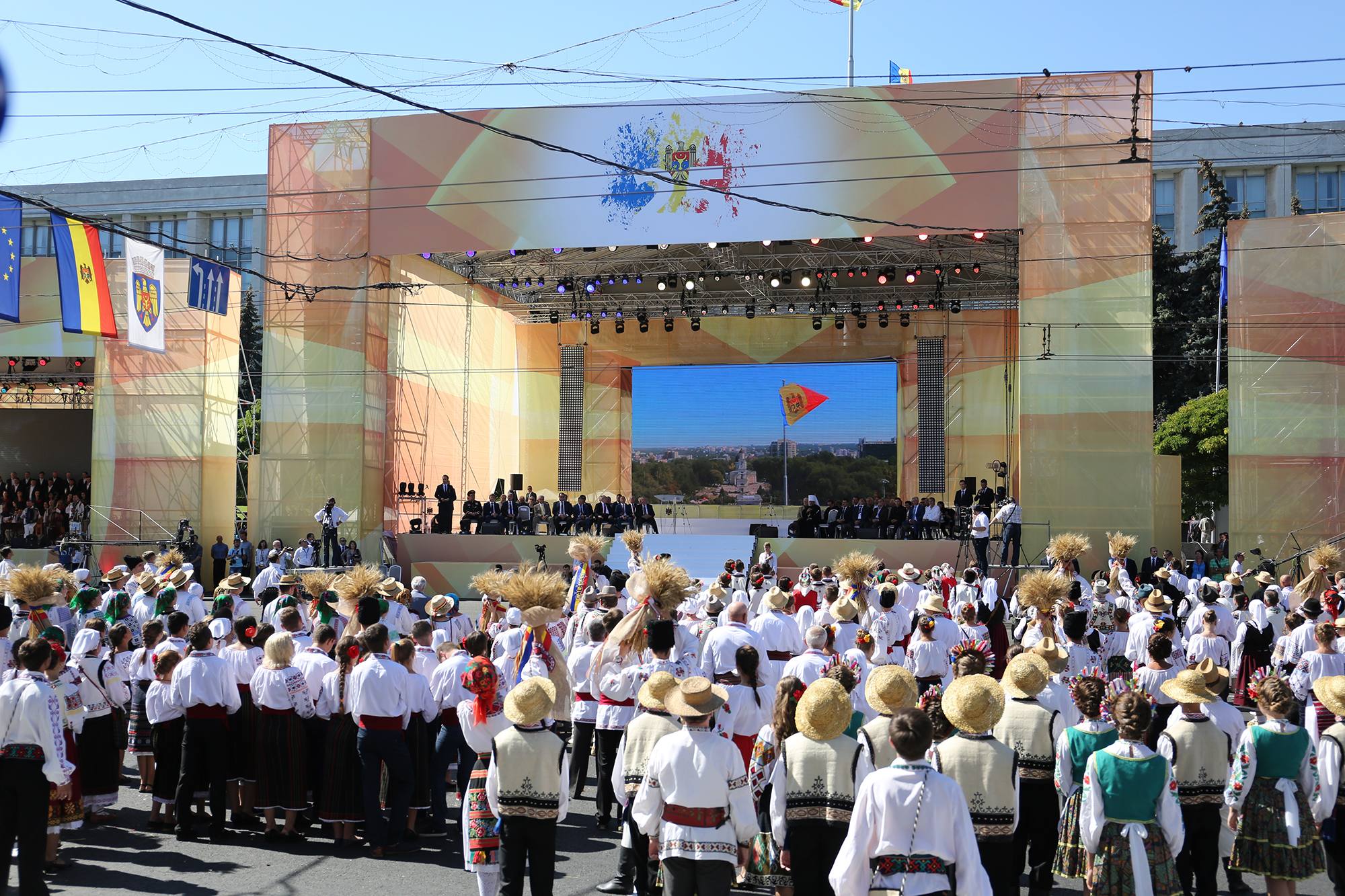
Independence Day celebrations in 2016

The Supreme Soviet of the Moldavian Soviet Socialist Republic held independent elections between February and June 1990. The elections resulted in Mircea Snegur being elected as speaker of the parliament (the effective head of state), with Mircea Druc as prime minister. On 23 June 1990, the parliament adopted the Declaration of Sovereignty of the Moldavian Soviet Socialist Republic, which, mainly stipulated the supremacy of Moldovan laws over those of the Soviet Union.

On 27 August 1991, the Parliament of the Republic of Moldova voted to adopt the Moldovan Declaration of Independence from the Soviet Union. Two years earlier that same day, the Popular Front of Moldova (FPM) organized a mass demonstration in Chișinău that later became known as the Great National Assembly, which pressured Soviet authorities to adopt a language law on 31 August 1989, which proclaimed the Romanian language to be the state language of the Moldavian Soviet Socialist Republic.

== Holiday celebrations ==
As a public holiday, it is a free day for most people and employees, and in the same way as some other holidays, most businesses are not open on 27 August. On this day, the President of the Republic gives a public speech, and officials lay flowers at the Stephen the Great Monument. A concert is also organized at the Great National Assembly Square. In 2001, 2011, 2016, 2021 and 2026, military parades have been held in the center of Chișinău. In 2026, a military parade was held in Bălți for the first time.

In 2020, due to the COVID-19 pandemic in Moldova, a national ceremony closed to the public was held in the Historical Hall of the Presidential Palace. That same year, in honor of the 29th anniversary of independence, a Turkish delegation led by Foreign Minister Mevlüt Çavuşoğlu inaugurated the consulate general of Turkey in Gagauzia, the first consulate opened in the region. He was accompanied by his Moldovan counterpart Oleg Țulea and Gagauzia Governor Irina Vlah.

== See also ==
- Independence of Moldova
- Chișinău Independence Day Parade

== Additional sources ==
- Olson, David M.; Norton, Philip (1996). The New Parliaments of Central and Eastern Europe. Psychology Press. ISBN 978-0-7146-4261-1.
