= General Inspectorate of Carabinieri =

National gendarmerie force of the Republic of Moldova

General Inspectorate of Carabinieri Inspectoratului General de Carabinieri
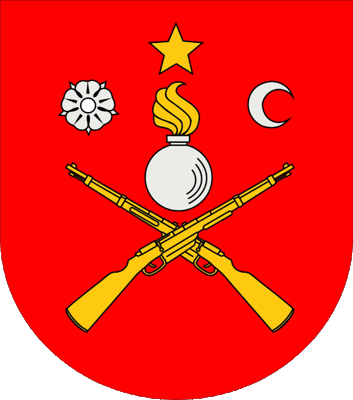
- Coat of Arms of the Moldovan Carabinier Troops

Agency overview
- Formed: 12 December 1991

Jurisdictional structure
- National agency (Operations jurisdiction): Republic of Moldova
- Operations jurisdiction: Republic of Moldova
- Legal jurisdiction: As per operations jurisdiction
- General nature: Gendarmerie

Operational structure
- Headquarters: Chişinău
- Agency executive: Brigadier general Dumitru Scurtu, General Commandant of the General Inspectorate of Carabinieri

Website
- www.carabinier.gov.md

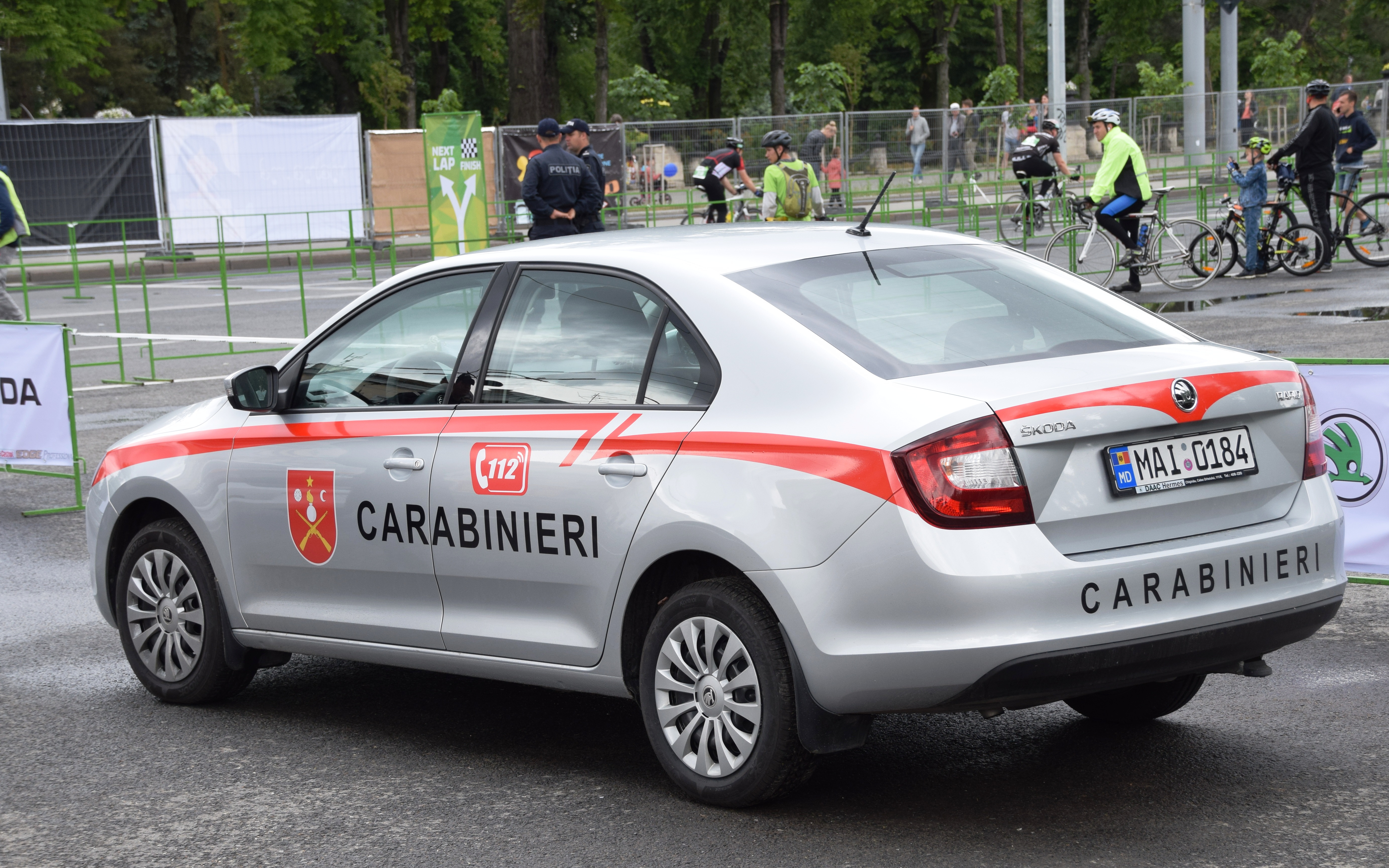
A patrol car from the Moldovan Carabinieri

The General Inspectorate of Carabinieri (Romanian: Inspectoratului General de Carabinieri) is the national gendarmerie force of the Republic of Moldova, under the administration of the Ministry of Internal Affairs of Moldova. The Carabinieri are to ensure, together with the police or independently, public order, protection of rights and freedoms of citizens, owners' properties and prevention of violations of the law. The structure of the agency is based on the Italian Carabinieri, where it gets its name.

The Department of Carabineer Troops has 5 Military Units and some 2,000 soldiers working on a contract basis or on time.

== History ==
On December 12, 1991, the establishment of the Carabinieri Troops was approved by the Parliament and subsequently signed by the President of the Republic of Moldova on the basis of the Internal Troops of the Ministry of Internal Affairs of Moldova, themselves formations that before independence served as part of the Internal Troops of the Ministry of Internal Affairs of the Moldovan SSR.

On March 13, 1992, a Carabinieri subdivision headed into the Transnistria region to serve on the Moldovan side of the Transnistria War. Over a week later, during the assault near the village of Coșnița, many soldiers of the Carabinieri were killed in its first engagement during the conflict. On August 24, 1993, the Carabinieri began fulfilling its tasks objectives, for which was approved by President Mircea Snegur 2 years earlier. In February 1998 the units and subunits of the Carabinieri troops participated in the liquidation of the natural disasters in the village of Hîncești.

== Structure ==
=== Central apparatus ===
- Operational Management Directorate
  - Public Order and Safety Section
  - Security and institutional protection section
  - Mission planning, organization and coordination section
- Human Resources Management Directorate
  - Personal Administration Section
  - Training Section
  - Education and Social Protection Section
- Logistics Department
  - Planning and Procurement Service
  - Military technical service and armament
  - Intendance Service
  - Service of capital construction, accommodation and operation
- Financial Directorate
- Directorate of Security and Investigations
- Directorate for International Cooperation, Project Management and Public Relations
- Department of Psychological Assistance
- Legal Section
- Medical Section
- Documentation Service
- Service of Communications and Information Technologies
- Mobilization and Special Transports Section

=== Subdivisions ===
- Operational Center
- Military band
- The "Credo" Choir
- Sports Team
- Prophylactic Curative Center and Medico-Military Expertise
- Insurance Center

==== Band of the Carabinier Troops ====
The Band of the Department of Carabinier Troops of the MAI (Romanian: Orchestra Departamentului de Carabinieri a Ministerului de Interne) is the sole military band of the Carabinier Troops, currently led by Lieutenant Oleg Casacu. It was founded on 1 April 1994, at the initiative of Colonel Nicolae Usaciov. It was created under the name of "Military Band of the Carabinier Troops". On 21 February 2002, the band's name was extended to reflect the DTC's full name. The band participates actively in cultural and artistic activities for the DTC (particularly military oath ceremonies and demonstrations organized by the government). It also participates in festivals and military tattoos in different countries such as Switzerland, Germany, France, Italy, Belgium, and Russia. In June 2015, the band won 1st Prize for being the best marching contingent in a concert in Italy. On the 20th anniversary of Moldova's independence in 2011, the band played Limba noastră (the national anthem) on Moldovan TV station Publika TV. It is on par with the Presidential Orchestra of the Republic of Moldova in the National Army and the Central Band of the Moldovan Border Police.

The following is a list of the band's music directors:

- Colonel Nicolae Usaciov (1994–2003)
- Captain Anatole Grischa (2003–2004)
- Colonel Ghenadie Tutunaru (2004–2010)
- Lieutenant Oleg Casacu (2010–Present)

==== Choir ====
The "Credo" Chamber Choir is a musical subdivision of the DTC. It has given concerts both on stage in the country and abroad. It is distinguished with numerous titles and awards. It has been honored with the title of winner at 25 international competitions in: Germany, Poland, Austria, Ukraine, Belgium, Bulgaria, United Kingdom, France, Belarus, Netherlands, Malta and Switzerland, being awarded with the Grand Prix, 12 medals Gold and 7 Silver.

==== Sports team ====
The sports team is made up of military sportsmen who actively participate in the Olympics, international and European championships. It prepares jointly with the central sports club "Dinamo", the Sports Agency, and the National Olympic Committee.

=== Units ===
- Military Unit 1001
- Military Unit 1002
- Military Unit 1003
- Military Unit 1006
- Military Unit 1045

== Ranks ==
							Source:
General de brigadă	Colonel	Locotenent-colonel	Maior	Căpitan	Locotenent-major	Locotenent	

							Source:
Sergent clasa I	Sergent clasa II	Sergent clasa III	Caporal	Soldat clasa I	Soldat clasa II	Soldat clasa III	

== See also ==
- Carabinier
- Carabinieri
- Carabineros
- Carabineros de Chile
- Gendarmerie
