= Moldovan Border Police =

Official paramilitary border guard of the Republic of Moldova

Border Police of the Republic of Moldova Poliția de Frontieră
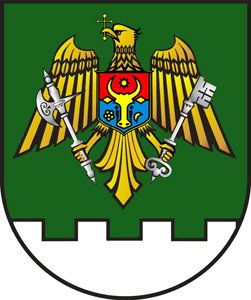
- The logo of the Moldovan Border Police

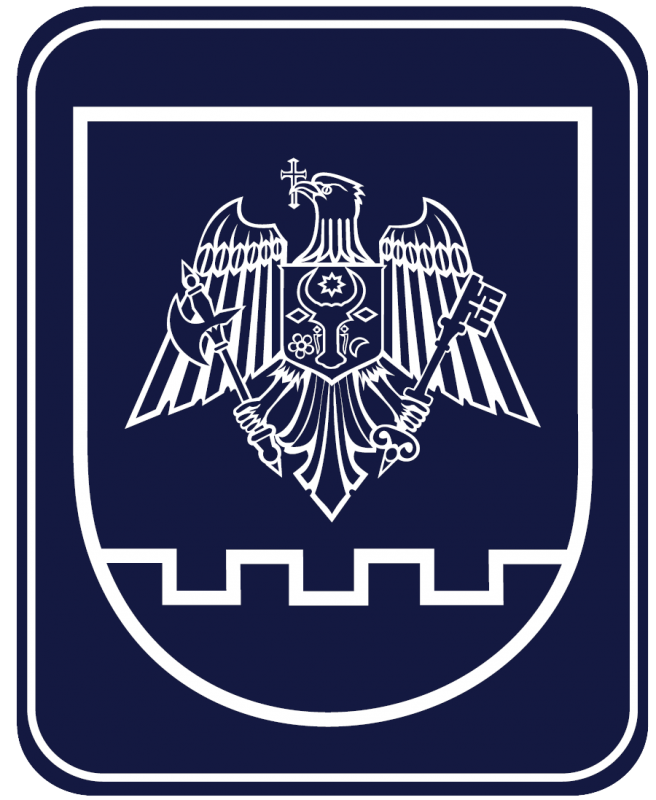
- Coat of Arms of the Moldovan Border Police

- The flag of the Moldovan Border Police

Agency overview
- Formed: June 10, 1992
- Preceding agencies: Border Guard Service; The Department of Border Guard Troops; Soviet Border Troops

Jurisdictional structure
- Operations jurisdiction: Moldova
- General nature: Civilian police
- Specialist jurisdiction: National border patrol, security, integrity

Operational structure
- Headquarters: Chișinău
- Elected officer responsible: Daniella Misail-Nichitin, Minister of Internal Affairs
- Agency executive: Ruslan Galușca (since 2023), Head of the General Inspectorate of Border Police
- Parent agency: Ministry of Internal Affairs of Moldova

Notables
- Anniversary: 10 June

Website
- www.border.gov.md/index.php/ro/

The Moldovan Border Police, also commonly known as the Moldovan Frontier Police, is the official paramilitary border guard of the Republic of Moldova. It is currently a department of the Ministry of Internal Affairs (MAI) and exercises its powers and policy in the accordance with the ministry. It was originally founded as the Border Guard Troops, and later the Border Guard Service of the Armed Forces of the Republic of Moldova.

It would remain a military branch until a 2012 government reform, putting it under the control of the MAI. The Day of the Border Police is celebrated annually on 10 June.

== History ==
Following the fall of the Soviet Union, the newly elected first President of Moldova, Mircea Snegur founded the border police on September 3, 1991. The administration of the border troops was entrusted to the Ministry of National Security of Moldova under the subordination of the entire subunit of the former Soviet Border Troops deployed on Moldovan territory. On January 11, 1992, Colonel Vasile Calmoi was appointed as the first commander of the border troops.

In accordance with a government decree which was signed on June 15, 1992, the Moldovan Border Troops became an official separate branch of the armed forces, with the law "On the State Border of the Republic of Moldova", coming into force by November 1994. Border guards day was first celebrated in Moldova on May 27, 1995, as the professional holiday of the Border Guard Troops of Moldova, before later being celebrated annually on June 10, which marks the day that President Snegur handed the flag of the border troops to promoted Brigader General Calmoi. In December 1999, the Moldovan Border Guard was reorganized into the Department of the Border Guard Troops of the Republic of Moldova and was withdrawn from the Ministry of National Security a month and a half later.

On December 1, 2005, the European Union Border Assistance Mission to the Republic of Moldova and Ukraine (EUBAM) was launched and on July 13, 2006, the EUBAM Territorial Office in Moldova and Ukraine was opened by the Border Guard Service. On January 10, 2007, the border service established the National Border Police College in Chișinău.

On July 1, 2012, the Prime Minister Vlad Filat signed a law, which would shift the border service from the armed forces to the internal affairs ministry.

== Responsibilities ==
In the field of border management, the border police's main purpose is to fight against illegal migration and cross-border crime. In order to fulfill these tasks, the border police finds and examines the contraventions, undertakes the judicial expertise of the documents, performs special investigative measures. The border police performs these duties within the boundaries of the Moldovan borders with Ukraine, and Romania.

The basic principles of which the border police follows include: legality, impartiality, respect for human rights, transparency, personal responsibility, and professionalism. The MAI exercises control and coordinates the activity of the border police as well as elaborates and promotes the state policy of the service. It has signed many agreements with the Romanian Border Police and the State Border Guard Service of Ukraine for joint cooperation in the policing of their borders as well as the Transnistrian-Moldovan border.

== Organization ==
The official structure of the Moldovan Border Police

=== Organizational structure of the Border Police Department ===
- Leadership
- General Border Control Directorate
- General Operations Management Division
- Human Resources General Directorate
- Prosecution Department
- Special Investigation Division
- Legal and contraventional practice
- Risk Analysis Division
- Documentation Directorate
- Inspection Directorate
- Policy and Assistance Directorate
- Directorate for International Cooperation
- Logistics and procurement
- Management Department
- Department of Economics and Finance
- Secretariat (with management status)
- Internal audit department
- Public relations department

=== Subdivisions subordinated to the Border Police Department ===
- North Regional Directorate
- West Regional Direction
- South Regional Directorate
- East Regional Directorate
- Center Regional Directorate
- Border Police Sector Chișinău International Airport
- Police Band
- Center of Excellence in Border Security

== List of General Directors ==
- Brigadier general Vasile Calmoi (January 11, 1992 – June 6, 2001)
- Brigadier general Igor Colenov (June 6, 2001 – December 17, 2009)
- Brigadier general Alexei Roibu (December 17, 2009 – April 8, 2011)
- Roman Revenco (April 8, 2011 – August 29, 2012)
- Dorin Purice (August 29, 2012)
- Fredolin Lecari (since September 28, 2016)
