= Ștefan cel Mare 2nd Motorized Infantry Brigade =

2nd Motorized Infantry Brigade "Stefan Cel Mare"
- Brigada 2 Infanterie Motorizată „Stefan Cel Mare”
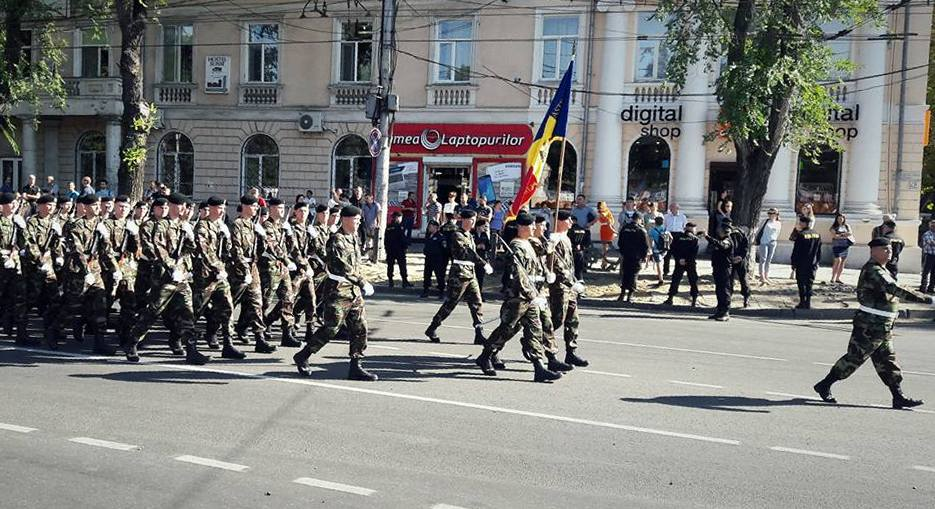
- The brigade during the 2016 Chișinău Independence Day Parade.
- Active: 16 October 1992-present
- Country: Moldova
- Branch: Moldovan Ground Forces
- Type: Motorized Infantry
- Garrison/HQ: Chișinău
- Nickname: The Stefan Cel Mare Brigade
- Engagements: Transnistria War
- Battle honours: Order of Allegiance to the Fatherland, 1st class (2017)

Commanders
- Notable commanders: Mihail Buclis; Oleg Chulkov

Insignia
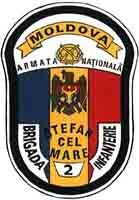
- Shoulder Patch

The 2nd Motorized Infantry Brigade "Stefan Cel Mare" is a motorized infantry unit of the Moldovan National Army's Ground Forces based in the Moldovan capital of Chișinău.

== Operations ==
It was created on October 16, 1992, on the basis of former Soviet units of the Kishinev Garrison. Prior to its official creation, it underwent a 2-month training period, in which the units that now make up the brigade prepared for frontline service in the Transnistria War. In June 2019, it was revealed that several soldiers from the brigade were beaten, which caused the prosecutor's office to open a criminal case.

== Structure ==
- Headquarters
- 2nd Motorized Infantry Battalion
- 3rd Motorized Infantry Battalion
- Military Band

== T-34 tank ==
In September 2015, on the instructions of Defense Minister Anatol Șalaru and with his personal participation, the T-34 tank mounted on the territory of the brigade in Chișinău was removed from the pedestal. According to Salaru, the tank will be exhibited in the Museum of the Soviet Occupation, along with five more monumental tanks planned for dismantling. He explained his reasoning for removing the tank as needing "to educate a new generation on other values" than what the tank represents.
