= Timeline of the Transnistrian War =

Chronological list of events related to the Transnistria War

This timeline of events is a chronological list of incidents and other notable occurrences related to the War of Transnistria, including events leading up to the war.

== 1988 ==
- 30 December 1988: in Chişinău, with the help of A. Bolshakov (the manager of "Tochilmash" factory from Tiraspol) an organisation, "Interdvizheniye" (Inter-movement), is formed. That later was renamed into "Yedinstvo" (Unity) – a movement with the aim of defending the interests of Russians living in Moldovan SSR. This movement was against the acceptance of Moldovan (Romanian) as the official language, Latin script for Moldovan SSR and later supported Transnistrian separatism.

== 1989 ==
- 30 March 1989: the presidium of the Supreme Council of the Moldavian SSR carried out onto a national discussion the draft laws "On the status of the state language of the Moldavian SSR" and "On the use of languages in the territory of the Moldavian SSR".
- March 1989: creation of the Popular Front of Moldova that was oriented onto Romania.
- 11 August 1989: in response on creation of Popular Front of Moldova, Tiraspol created own organization, the United Council of Working Collectives.
- 27 August 1989: the Popular Front of Moldova organized a mass demonstration in Chişinău, that became known as the Great National Assembly, which pressured the authorities of the Moldavian Soviet Socialist Republic to adopt a language law on August 31, 1989, that proclaimed the Moldovan language written in the Latin script to be the state language of the Moldavian SSR. Its identity with the Romanian language was also established.
- 21 August – 22 September 1989: mass strikes rocked the left bank of Dniester accounting for some 200,000.
- 31 August 1989: the Supreme Council of the Moldavian SSR adopted laws on languages. It has been the National Language Day ever since.
- 7–10 November 1989 (Soviet Holiday: Day of the October Revolution): civil unrest in Chișinău, attack upon the headquarters of the Ministry of Internal Affairs.

== 1990 ==
- 27 April 1990: the Supreme Council of the Moldavian SSR adopted a new state flag (see Flag of Moldova) with a temporary coat of arms.
- 5 June 1990: the Supreme Council of the Moldavian SSR established a name for the new state – the Republic of Moldova.
- 23 June 1990: there was adopted a declaration of sovereignty of the Republic of Moldova, stating that the republic is a single, sovereign, and non-divided state, and that these laws would henceforth supersede the laws of the Soviet Union. The Parliament of Moldova also:
1. announced that the Molotov-Ribbentrop Pact was considered invalid.
2. announced that the creation of the Moldavian SSR was unlawful.
3. adopted the decision to abolish the Moldavian SSR, an entity created on 2 August 1940.
- July 1990: the 2nd Congress of the Popular Front of Moldova proposed to rename the country to the Romanian Republic of Moldova.
- 15 July 1990: Anatoly Lukyanov, Chairman of the Supreme Soviet of the USSR in Moscow, sends a letter written by Transnistrian and Gagauzian separatists to "Izvestia".
- August 1990: the Moldovan SSR refuses to participate in the referendum for the retention of the Soviet Union, but in the Gagauz and Transnistrian regions – and with the help of Soviet 14th Guards Army (according to an agreement between Anatoly Lukyanov and Igor Smirnov) – a referendum is organised.
- 2 September 1990: the Transnistrian Republic is proclaimed in Tiraspol at the 2nd Extraordinary Congress of Deputies and elected a temporary Supreme Council. Igor Smirnov is confirmed the chairman of the council. The council also adopted its own declaration on sovereignty and law on languages.
- 16 September 1990: a meeting protesting against separatism is held in the village of Lunga, near Dubăsari.
- 2 November 1990: the bridges over the Dniester are blocked by separatists. At the bridge near Dubăsari, clashes are reported between the Moldavian police and civilians supporting separatism. A part of Moldovan forces, not having shields and being attacked by the crowd, shot into the air and into the ground, causing 3 deaths and several wounded by ricochet. Two of the dead are ethnic Moldovans, who support independence for Transnistria. The third, also an independence supporter, is an ethnic Ukrainian.
- 22 December 1990: the Soviet President Mikhail Gorbachev signed a decree "regarding the measures that would bring the situation back to normal in the Moldavian SSR".

== 1991 ==
- 12 March 1991: based on the order of V. C. Bogdanov, a place tenant on the Tiraspol city Executive Committee, a 200-strong military unit is formed, with weapons and ammunition received from the Soviet Army. The same situation occurs in Tighina, Dubăsari and Rîbnița.
- May 1991: the Moldovan government of Mircea Druc, a coalition between the Moldovan Popular Front and the reformist wing of the Communist Party of Moldova, is dismissed. The Moldovan Popular Front enters into opposition.
- May 1991: the Supreme Soviet of Transnistria orders all policemen from the Transnistrian territory to obey the separatist authorities. A separatist Ministry of Interior and Prosecutor's Office is also formed.
- 19 August 1991: separatist authorities proclaim an exceptional situation at Tiraspol and Tighina. Dniester guards are patrolling the cities and roads are blocked. Transnistrian leaders ask the local population to support the coup which is currently underway in Moscow.
- In the aftermath of the failure of the Soviet coup attempt of 1991, on 27 August 1991, the Moldovan parliament adopted the Declaration of Independence of the Republic of Moldova. The PMR interpreted this as meaning that the 1940-merger of the two sides of the Dniester river was dissolved.
- 29 August 1991: Transnistria's independence leader Igor Smirnov and three other deputies arrived in Kyiv to meet the Ukrainian leader Leonid Kravchuk. Several separatists leaders, including Igor Smirnov, Andrei Cheban and G. Pologov, are arrested by Moldova's police and immediately transported to a prison in Moldova. In protest, the women's strike committee headed by Galina Andreeva blocked the Moscow-Chişinău railway line at a waypoint between Bender and Tiraspol, until the arrested were freed by the president of Moldova Mircea Snegur in an attempt to quell the spirits.
- 6 and 18 September 1991: separatist authorities order all military units of the Soviet Union in the region to obey the jurisdiction of Transnistria.
- 10–20 September 1991: at the instigation of the Odesa military district leadership a general assembly of officers and non-commissioned officers from the Soviet Army in Transnistria is held. On this occasion, an agreement is expressed to support Transnistrian separatism, independent of any orders from Moscow.
- 11 September 1991: the Russian military unit 03517 from Rîbnița decides to defend the Transnistrian Republic.
- 19 September 1991: a police unit in Rîbnița is captured by separatists.
- 22 September 1991: a police unit in Camenca is captured by separatists.
- 2 October 1991: Tiraspol city Executive Committee issues a decision asking the local police force to refuse to cede authority to the authorities in Chişinău.
- 16 October 1991: at Dubăsari, an explosion occurs at the police station, which is still loyal to the authorities in Chişinău.
- 8 November 1991: the newspaper Nezavismaya Moldova publishes facts about human rights abuses in Transnistria: namely, explosions, burning of the homes of people who refuse to accept the separatist authorities, threats against the family of policeman Vladimir Colesnic (the second in command of the Dubăsari police unit which refused to accept the separatist authority) and the situation of the refugees.
- 15 November 1991: in Tighina and Dubăsari people are forbidden to subscribe to Romanian language newspapers from Chişinău.
- 19 November 1991: weaponry and ammunition is transferred from the 14th Soviet Army unit to the separatist authorities.
- 21 November 1991: authorities from Tiraspol forbid local businesses to collaborate with the National Bank of Moldova.
- 26–30 November 1991: Transnistrian guard from Rîbnița receive weapons and ammunition from the 14th Soviet Army unit based at Colbasna.
- 27 November 1991: in the local authority's building in Teia (Transnistria) village (Grigoriopol district) 6 people from Tiraspol (2 with automatic guns) force the local authority to organise a ballot for the election of the Transnistrian president. The same situation occurs in other areas in Transnistria.
- 27 November 1991: a delegation from the International Helsinki Committee for Human Rights visit Moldova. Igor Smirnov refuses to participate in the meeting in Tiraspol with the foreign visitors.
- 27 November 1991: Trudovoi Tiraspol, a newspaper run by OSTK, publishes a list detailing the names and addresses of Moldovan policemen from Transnistria who refuse to obey the separatist authorities and ask for reprisals against them.
- 1 December 1991: a group of around 20-25 people (6 of them with automatic guns) enter the village of Mălăieşti in Grigoriopol district and petition the election officials from the Transnistrian authorities. However, the local villagers refuse to participate in elections. Meanwhile, the same incidents occur in Speia, Butor and Taşlîc.
- 1–5 December 1991: all the bridges over the Dniester are blocked by separatist forces.
- 5 December 1991: Viktor Malic, an assistant at the Soviet Union's Ministry of the Interior, (in an interview with "Nezavisimaia Moldova") reveals that as, the result of research done by the Soviet Union's Prosecutor's Office - regarding the events on 2 November 1990 in Dubăsari - the Transnistrian authorities had acted unlawfully and Moldovan police acted within their legal limits.
- 6 December 1991: a group of armed separatists order the Slobozia police unit to accept the jurisdiction of Transnistria. The commander of this police unit is beaten and prevented from accessing his local force.
- 6 December 1991: Transnistrian guards open fire on a car belonging to the Moldovan police at the bridge over Dniester at Gura Bâcului. The policeman, N. Dociu, is wounded.
- 8 December 1991: L. Toderaş, the prosecutor of Tighina city, is arrested by separatists and interrogated at OSTK.
- 8 December 1991: 700 Transnistrian guards and cossacks, armed with bren guns, armoured carriers and grenade throwers (and all received from the Russian 14th Guards Army) mass at the outskirts of Dubăsari. The police receive an ultimatum to swear allegiance to the Transnistrian Republic.
- 9 December 1991: a police unit from Tighina are visited by a group of separatists (headed by Kogut from Tiraspol) and inform the local commandant, V. Gusleacov, that he is being dismissed from his position. The separatists also ask him to give them the keys and all relevant documents to the newly appointed police chief. Gusleacov refused, and the police unit is then surrounded by Transnistrian guards. Tighina policemen who later attend this incident are arrested and disarmed. The building housing the local Transport Police is subsequently attacked and all vehicles are confiscated. The local police are aided by people from nearby villages such as Varniţa, Chircăieşti, Ursoaia forcing the Transnistrian guard to withdraw.
- 10 December 1991: near the village Lunga, 5 Transnistrian guards stop a car with policeman A. Ismailov inside. The guards take Ismailov out of the car, beat him and confiscate his gun.
- 10 December 1991: S. Trocin and V. Oprea are arrested in Tighina and imprisoned for several days in a basement simply because they spoke Romanian in a Sovetskaia street.
- 11 December 1991: elections are held for the position of President of Transnistria.
- On the night of 12 to 13 December 1991: the Police station in Dubăsari is besieged by separatists forces. 35 policemen are in the building and all receive death threats.
- 13 December 1991: a group of policemen are sent to assist the besieged Dubăsari police station but are attacked with bren guns. 4 policemen are killed in this incident; Ghenadie Iablocikin, Mihail Arnăut, Valentin Mereniuc and Gheorghe Caşu.
- 13 December 1991: at Tighina, a reporter from Moldovan television is arrested and his camera confiscated. He is later freed after the Moldovan police intervene.
- 14 December 1991: in Dubăsari, shots are fired at electrician A. Terentiev and against a truck belonging to the regional Soviet (which had refused to accept separatism). The truck driver, V. Chiriac, and his passenger, are wounded.
- 14 December 1991: policemen S. Lopatiuc and V. Dorofenco are taken hostage by separatists. They are hospitalized after being beaten.
- 14 December 1991: the newspaper Drujba from Grigoriopol, which voiced opinions against separatism, is closed by the Transnistrian authorities. A local radio station is also attacked.
- 15 December 1991: the Moldovan president, Mircea Snegur, meets with Igor Smirnov.
- 21 December 1991: Igor Smirnov is elected an honorary cossack
- 26 December 1991: the Soviet Union is dissolved.
- 27 December 1991: access to the building housing the regional Dubăsari Soviet (which had refused to accept separatism) is blocked by the Transnistrian authorities.

== 1992 ==
- 3 January 1992: the building housing the KGB unit at Tighina is occupied by separatists.
- 3 January 1992: the mayor of Varniţa, A. Cuconescu, and several other people are arrested in Varniţa Town Hall and taken to Tiraspol where they are interrogated and threatened with prison. They are later freed after a request from the Chişinău authorities.
- 6 January: on the road between Dubăsari and Rîbnița 6 armed Transnistrian guards capture Moldovan policemen P. Frecăuțan and H. Adam. They are ordered to leave the region with their families and are threatened with death if they refuse.
- 9 January 1992: 70 armed separatists attack a column of trucks from military unit 07481, which transports weapons from Hlinaia (Grigoriopol district) to Chişinău. Trucks, weapons and ammunition are all captured by the separatists.
- 12 January 1992: Transnistrian guards open fire on a car belonging to the Moldovan police in Dubăsari. 2 people, policemen S. Ţîstoi and a passenger, are wounded. In another incident at Dubăsari, another 2 people are wounded, policeman S. Manole and G. Damaschin.
- 13 January 1992: E. Martin and V. Plămădeală are shot and wounded by Transnistrian guards at an exit point from Dubăsari.
- 15 January 1992: 2 policemen and a woman are wounded when gunfire is opened on a Moldovan police car.
- 22 January 1992: the prosecutor of Tighina, L. Toderaş, is arrested again. Following talks with the Moldovan police he is later freed.
- 25 January 1992: L. Toderaş, prosecutor of Tighina, is arrested yet again. His family and colleagues are threatened.
- 29 January 1992: separatist militia arrest a group of drunken cossacks in Tiraspol. The headquarters of this militia is then blocked by a committee of local women. The cossacks are later freed.
- 30 January 1992: there are attacks against several units of the Moldovan police in Tighina. 39 policemen are arrested. The Transport Police section is stormed and the building later set on fire. 18 guns and 6 cars are stolen.
- 31 January 1992: 4 policemen are arrested in Tighina and subsequently beaten.
- 1 February 1992: F. Ţurcan is killed at a check-point by Transnistrian guards in Lunga, a village near Dubăsari. Turcan's car is fired on despite him responding to a request from the Transnistrian guards to stop his vehicle.
- 2 February 1992: also at Lunga, policeman V. Rusu is wounded after his car is stopped by 18 separatists guards.
- 4 February 1992: the deputy of the Tighina Police unit, A. Corolicov, and police officer O. Pavliuc are arrested when they return from duty. They are subsequently beaten and their weapons confiscated.
- 12 February 1992: the medical nursery school Tighina is closed by Transnistrian authorities.
- 14 February 1992: people from Transnistria are heading to Moscow to inform public opinion about human rights abuses in Transnistria.
- 19 February 1992: the Customs building in Dubăsari is attacked by separatist forces and Customs officers are beaten. Their weapons are confiscated.
- 20 February 1992: peaceful demonstrators occur in Lunga, near Dubăsari, where the people are protesting against a referendum organised in the village by the Transnistrian authorities. The demonstration is later broken up by force. The protestors are fired on and tear gas used against them. The order to use force is made by Alexandru Porojan, a separatist leader from Dubăsari.
- 21 February 1992: in Slobozia, the bank accounts of 2 schools which refuse to accept the legitimacy of the Transnistrian authorities, are closed down.
- 22 February 1992: military unit 01002 is attacked by separatists. 95 officers and soldiers are ambushed and driven to a bridge over the Dniester river. They are then told to go on to Chişinău on foot.
- 29 February 1992: unknown assailants armed with automatic guns stop a car near Dubova and kill the driver, N. Boiniceanu. Another person is wounded. In addition, the gunmen rob all the passengers in the vehicle. .
- After Moldova became a member of the United Nations on 2 March 1992, Moldovan President Mircea Snegur (president from 1990 to 1996) authorized concerted military action against PMR forces which had been attacking police outposts loyal to the Moldovan government on the left bank of the river Dniester (Nistru), and on a smaller section of the right bank around the southern city of Tighina (Bender/Bendery). The PMR forces, aided by contingents of Russian Cossacks and the Russian 14th Guards Army, consolidated their control over most of the disputed area.
- 17 March 1992: Moldova had troops under the Ministry of the Interior. On 17 March 1992, they started recruiting troops for the newly created Ministry of Defence.
- 5 April 1992: Vice-president Rutskoy of Russia, in a speech delivered to 5,000 people in Tiraspol, encouraged the Transnistrian people to obtain their independence.
- 2 June 1992: Ilie Ilașcu and three more ethnic Romanians, members of the "Ilașcu group" (Ilașcu together with Andrei Ivanțoc, Alexandru Leşco and Tudor Petrov Popa) were arrested by the breakaway Transnistrian government and charged with the murder of two separatist officials.
- 19–21 June 1992: the Battle of Bender takes place. It results in a Russian–Transnistrian victory.
- 21 July 1992: a ceasefire was declared, which has held ever since.

== 1993 ==
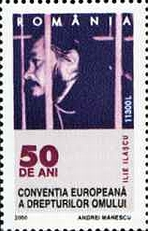
Ilie Ilașcu. 50 years of European Convention on Human Rights

- On December 9, 1993, the Supreme Court of Transnistria found Ilie Ilașcu guilty of a number of offences defined in the Criminal Code of the Moldovan Soviet Socialist Republic, including incitement to commit an offence against national security, organisation of activities with the aim of committing extremely dangerous offences against the State, murdering a representative of the State with the aim of spreading terror, premeditated murder, unlawfully requisitioning means of transport, deliberate destruction of another's property and illegal or unauthorised use of ammunition or explosives.

== Follow-up ==
- 2001: Ilașcu was eventually released in 2001, two years after he filed an application with the European Court of Human Rights and following a verdict of the European Court for Human Rights, where he sued both Russia and Moldova.
- 2 June 2007: Ivanțoc was released by the PMR authorities, after pressures of the international community. After he was released he tried to reenter PMR-controlled territory without permission and was captured and beaten by the PMR security forces, then forced to leave the PMR and declared persona non-grata.

== See also ==
- War of Transnistria
- History of Transnistria
