= 1st Motorized Infantry Brigade "Moldova" =

- Brigada 1 Infanterie Motorizată „Moldova”
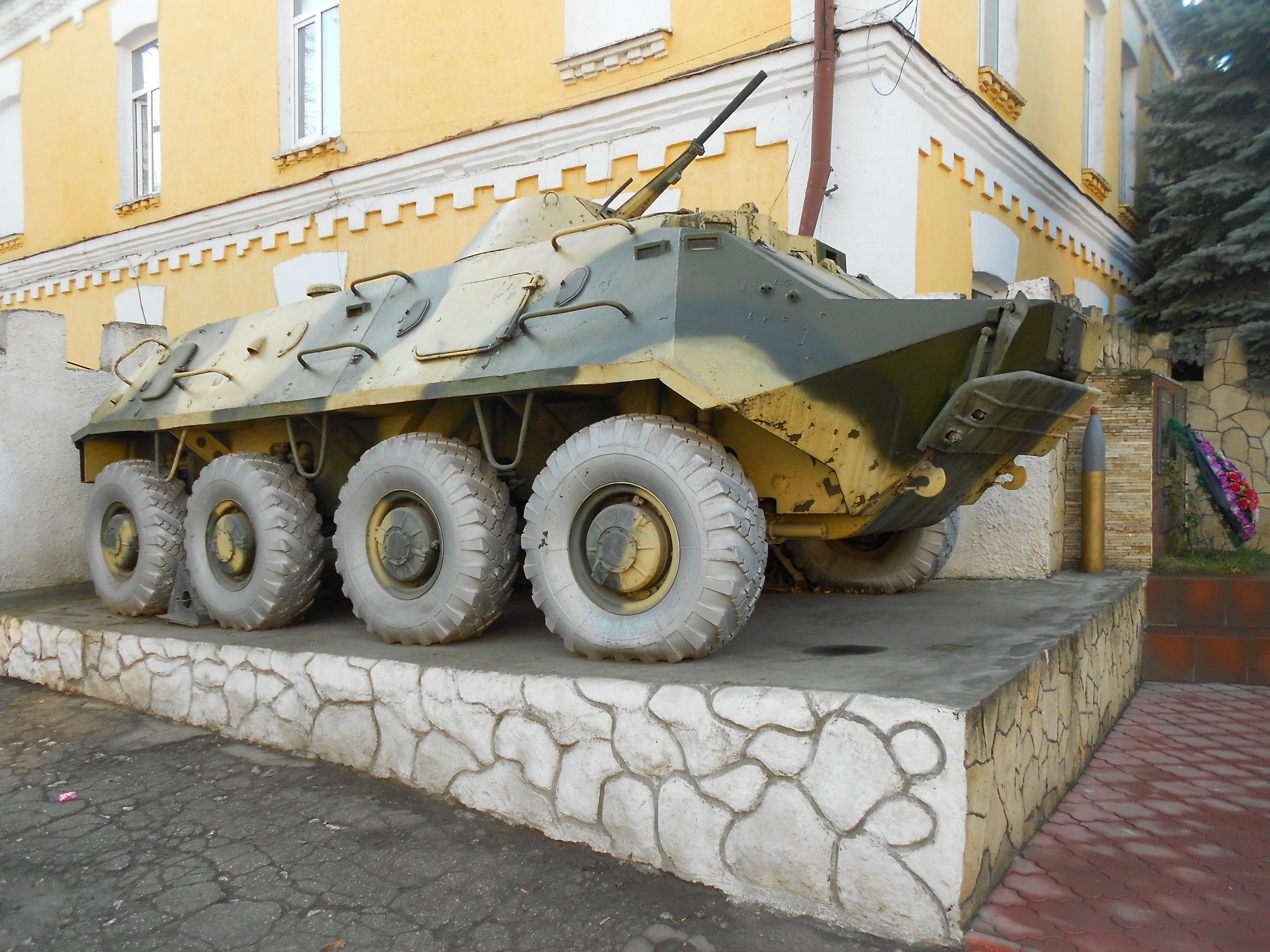
- A Transport vehicle of the brigade in Bălți
- Active: 10 April 1992-present
- Country: Moldova
- Branch: Moldovan Ground Forces
- Type: Motorized Infantry
- Garrison/HQ: Bălți
- Nickname: The Moldova Brigade
- Engagements: Transnistria War

Commanders
- Current commander: Colonel Ion Coțofana
- Notable commanders: Leonid Carasiov

Insignia
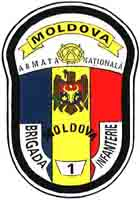
- Shoulder Patch

The 1st Motorized Infantry Brigade "Moldova" is a motorized infantry unit of the Moldovan National Army's Ground Forces based in the Moldovan city of Bălți. It was the first Army unit to be created in the newly independent country, being founded on 10 April 1992.

== History ==
=== Origins ===
It was made up of elements of former Soviet units in Bălți and Florești that used to form the 86th Guards Motor Rifle Division.

Among the former Soviet units at Bălți and Florești in 1988 were the 260th Guards Motor Rifle Regiment (Florești); the 263rd Guards Motor Rifle Regiment (Bălți); the 341st Motor Rifle Regiment (Bălți); the 88th Guards Tank Regiment (Florești) and the 191st Guards Artillery Regiment (Bălți).

=== Unit establishment ===
It was the first Army unit to be created in the newly independent country, being founded on 10 April 1992. The name "Moldova" was granted in August 1993 by order of defense minister Ion Costaș, and was handed its battle flag later that month by presidential decree. In 1996, the International Military Applications "MEDCEUR-1996" were organized at the Brigade Training Center located near the village of Elizaveta with the involvement of the American and German armies. Besides military actions, the brigade and its staff participated in containing the floods of 2008.

In November 2018, the Moldova Brigade, along with the other 2 army brigades, took part in Dragon Pioneer military exercise with over 150 soldiers of the USAREUR's 2nd Cavalry Regiment. In 2013, the brigade commander gave President Nicolae Timofti an engraved souvenir of the unit.

== Organization ==
Like all the other motorized infantry brigades in the ground forces, the brigade maintains a military band which serves on special occasions.

== Commanders ==
- Colonel Leonid Carasiov (1990-1997)
- Igor Gorgan
- Lieutenant Colonel Ghenadie Nitrean (July 29, 2013 - September 27, 2017)
- Colonel Ion Ojog (2021-2024)
- Colonel Veaceslav Balan (2024-21 August 2026)
- Colonel Ion Coțofana (since 21 August 2026)
