= Russian-occupied territories =

Ongoing military occupations by Russia since 1991

The Russian-occupied territories refers to Russia's military occupations in several other post-Soviet states since the dissolution of the Soviet Union in 1991. These disputes are primarily an aspect of the post-Soviet conflicts, and have led to some countries losing parts of their sovereign territory to what a large portion of the international community designates as a Russian military occupation, regardless of what their status is in Russian law.

The term is applied to:

- Transnistria in Moldova
- Abkhazia and South Ossetia in Georgia
- Crimea and Donetsk, Kherson, Luhansk, and Zaporizhzhia oblasts, territories of Ukraine, occupied fully or partially

== Overview ==
Map showing Russia in dark red with Russian-occupied territories in Europe in light red, as follows: In Moldova: Transnistria (1), since 1992; In Georgia: Abkhazia (2) and South Ossetia (3), since 2008; In Ukraine: Crimea (4) and parts of Luhansk Oblast (5) and Donetsk Oblast (6), since 2014; and parts of Zaporizhzhia Oblast (7) and Kherson Oblast (8), since 2022

Territory in question	Transnistria	Abkhazia	South Ossetia	Crimea and Sevastopol	Donetsk, Kherson, Luhansk and Zaporizhzhia
Claimed by	Moldova (1992–present)	Georgia (1992–present)		Ukraine (2014–present)	Ukraine (2022–present)
De facto administrated by	Transnistria (1992–present)	Abkhazia (1992–present)	South Ossetia (1992–present)	Russia (2014–present)	Russia (2022–present) active war zone
Russia considers it part of its territory?	No, Russia officially recognizes Moldovan sovereignty over Transnistria, following the Transnistria War	No, Russia recognises Abkhazia as an independent state since 2008 following the Russo-Georgian War	No, Russia recognises South Ossetia as an independent state since 2008 following the Russo-Georgian War	Yes, annexed in 2014 as federal subjects of Republic of Crimea and Sevastopol, following the start of Russo-Ukrainian War	Yes, annexed in 2022 as federal subjects of Donetsk People's Republic, Luhansk People's Republic, Kherson Oblast and Zaporozhye Oblast, following the 2022 invasion of Ukraine
Nature of occupation	Presence of the Operational Group of Russian Forces, opposed by Moldova	Presence of the 7th Military Base, opposed by Georgia	Presence of the 4th Guards Military Base, opposed by Georgia	Russian annexation not recognised internationally. Considered by Ukraine as "temporarily occupied territories"	
De facto armed forces	Armed Forces of Transnistria	Abkhazian Armed Forces	Armed Forces of South Ossetia	Russian Armed Forces	active war zone
De facto circulating currency	Transnistrian ruble	Russian ruble			Russian ruble and Ukrainian hryvnia
Passports	Transnistrian passport. Residents are also eligible for Moldovan or Russian passports for travel abroad.	Abkhazian passport. Residents are also eligible for Russian passports for travel abroad.	South Ossetian passport. Residents are also eligible for Russian passports for travel abroad.	Russian passport	Ukrainian passport being replaced by Russian passport
Under Russian telephone numbering plan?	No, +373	Yes, +7 (840) and +7 (940)	Yes, +7 (850) and +7 (929)	Yes, +7 (978), +7 (365) and +7 (869)	Yes, +7 (856), +7 (857), +7 (860) and +7 (810)

== Moldova ==
=== Transnistria ===
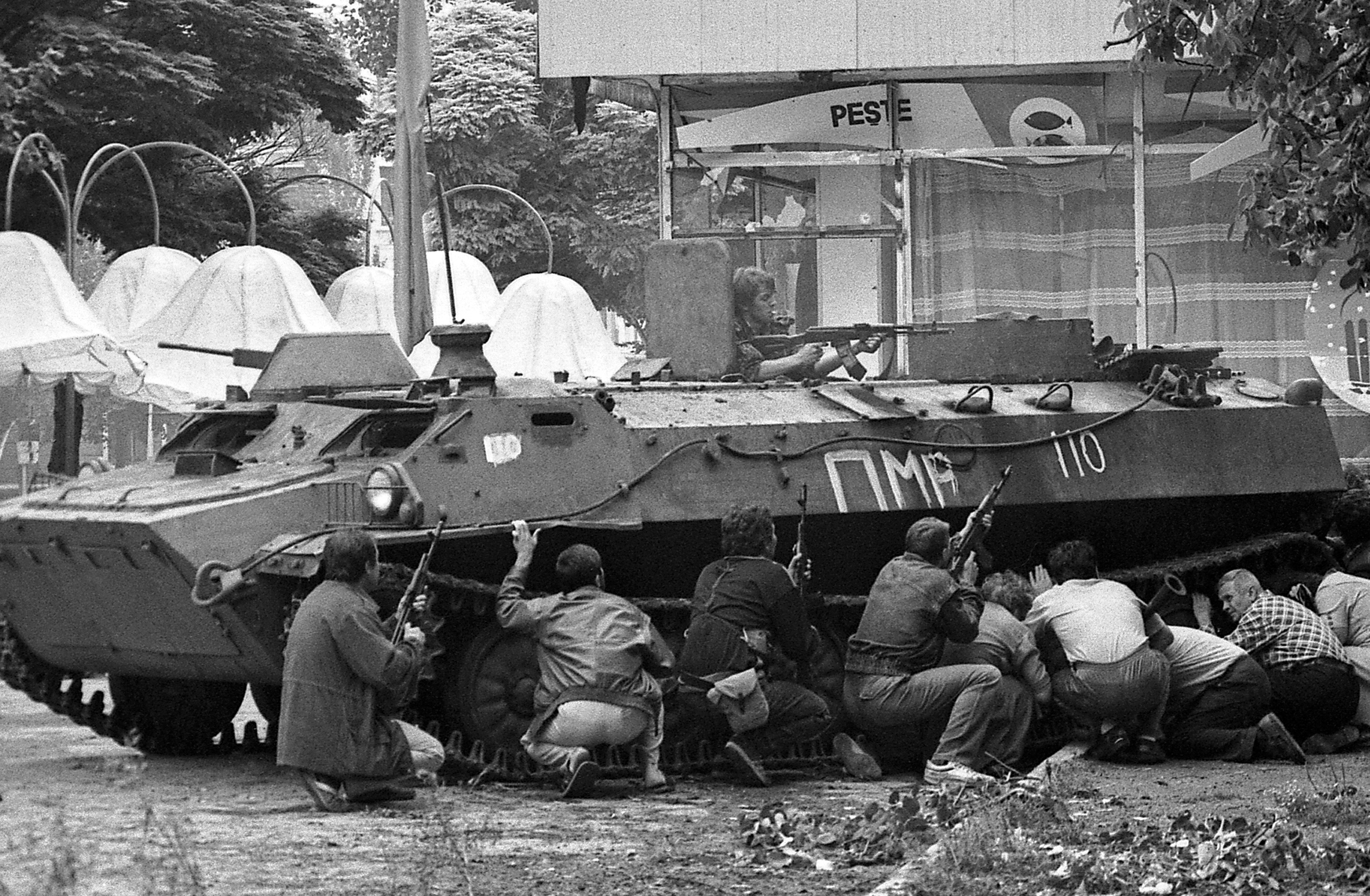
Transnistrian forces during the Battle of Bender in June 1992

Following the dissolution of the Soviet Union in 21 December 1991, many Moldovans all over the former Moldavian Soviet Socialist Republic started demanding unification with Romania; and that "Moldovan" (which they wanted to be referred to as Romanian) be written in the Latin alphabet, as opposed to Cyrillic, and that it become the only official language of Moldova – which was subsequently approved in March 2023. This was not well received in modern Gagauzia, an ethnically Turkic region in Moldova, and in most of the area on the left bank of the Dniester river. Here, Russian-speakers, who formed the majority in the region, advocated that Russian be kept as an official language of Moldova alongside Moldovan (which was still to be written in Cyrillic and not to be referred to as Romanian), and that Moldova not unify with Romania. These differences erupted into the Transnistria War in 1992, which, following the bloody 1992 battle of Bender, resulted in victory for the separatists, who had earlier declared the independence of Transnistria following a Russian military intervention there, which is still present today in the area, and which still defends the Transnistrian regime today despite Moldovan requests to withdraw from what is still legally its internationally recognized territory. Since the end of the war, Transnistria has made several requests to become a part of Russia.

== Georgia ==
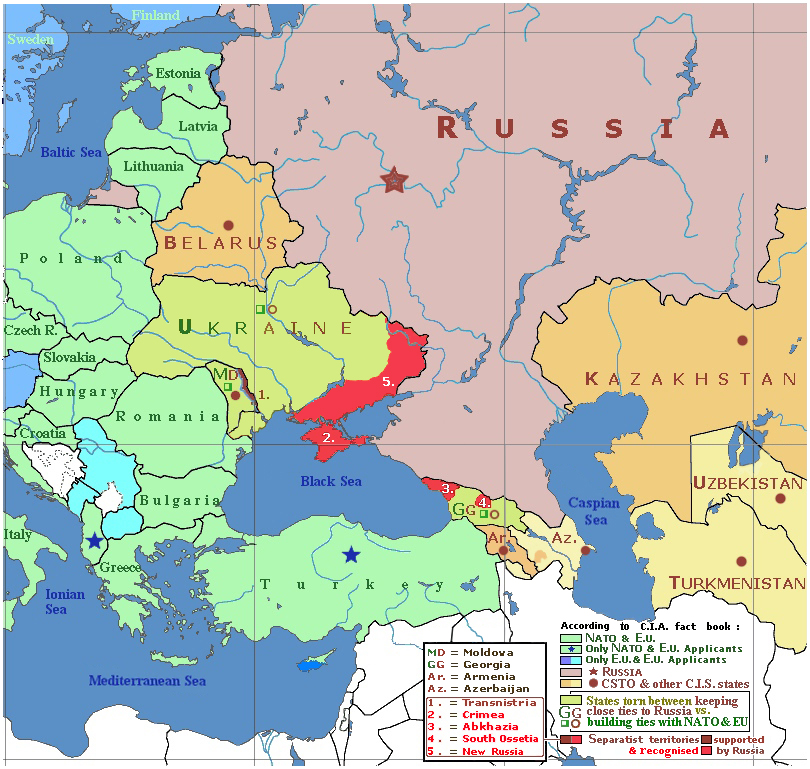
Map showing Russian political and military influence or interference in Post-Soviet conflicts after Russian invasion of Ukraine

=== Abkhazia and South Ossetia ===
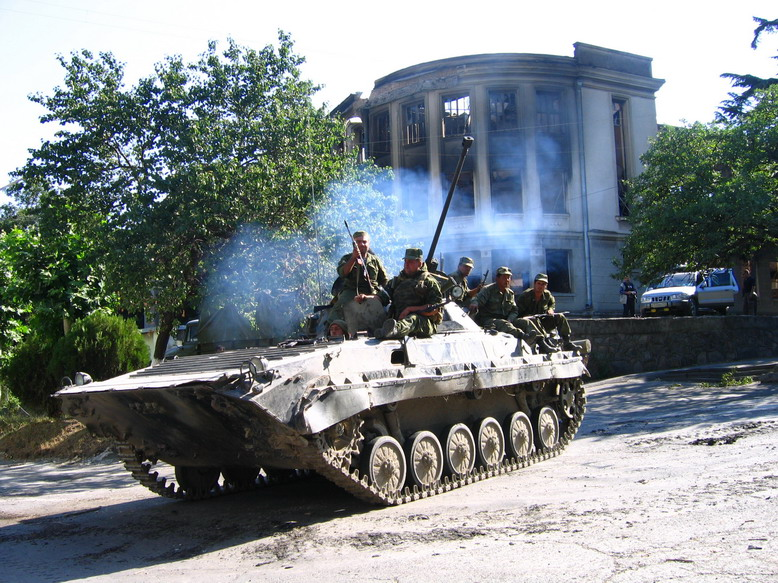
Russian BMP-2 from the 58th Army in South Ossetia

After the Russo-Georgian War, President Medvedev signed decrees on 26 August 2008 recognizing the independence of Abkhazia and South Ossetia as sovereign states. Russia established diplomatic relations with these partially recognized states and placed Russian troops in both. Russian security forces were deployed along the demarcation lines with Georgia.

Many international journalists and media companies, such as Al Jazeera, BBC and Radio Free Europe/Radio Liberty, as well as non-governmental organizations, have referred to Abkhazia and South Ossetia as Russian-occupied territories.

The Georgian parliament unanimously passed a resolution on 28 August 2008 formally declaring Abkhazia and South Ossetia as Russian-occupied territories and Russian troops as occupying forces. The law forbids entry into the regions from Russia and subjects violators to a fine or imprisonment. Abkhazia may only be entered from Zugdidi Municipality, via the Enguri Bridge. South Ossetia, however, does not allow entry of foreigners from Georgian-controlled territory. The crossing points into South Ossetia have been effectively closed for locals as well since September 2019, while a special permit regime is in place by South Ossetian de facto authorities for two crossing points: Akhalgori – Odzisi (Mtskheta Municipality) and Karzmani (Sachkhere Municipality).

In April 2010, the Georgian parliament's foreign affairs committee asked the legislative bodies of 31 countries to declare Abkhazia and South Ossetia as territories under Russian occupation and to recognize the massive displacement of civilians from those regions by Russia as amounting to ethnic cleansing. The Russian Foreign Ministry retaliated, asking Georgia to abolish the law. Meanwhile, the United Nations General Assembly annually condemned the forced demographic changes taking place in both regions as result of the displacement and the refusal of the right of return of Internally displaced persons (in practical terms, ethnic Georgians). In 2022 95 UN members supported the resolution, with 12 against and 56 abstentions. It noted in a 2022 report, acknowledged with the same resolution, the Russian enforcement of the de facto border which violates "freedom of movement" principles.

South Ossetia has also discussed several times a possible annexation of the state by Russia.

== Ukraine ==
=== Crimea and parts of Donetsk and Luhansk (2014) ===
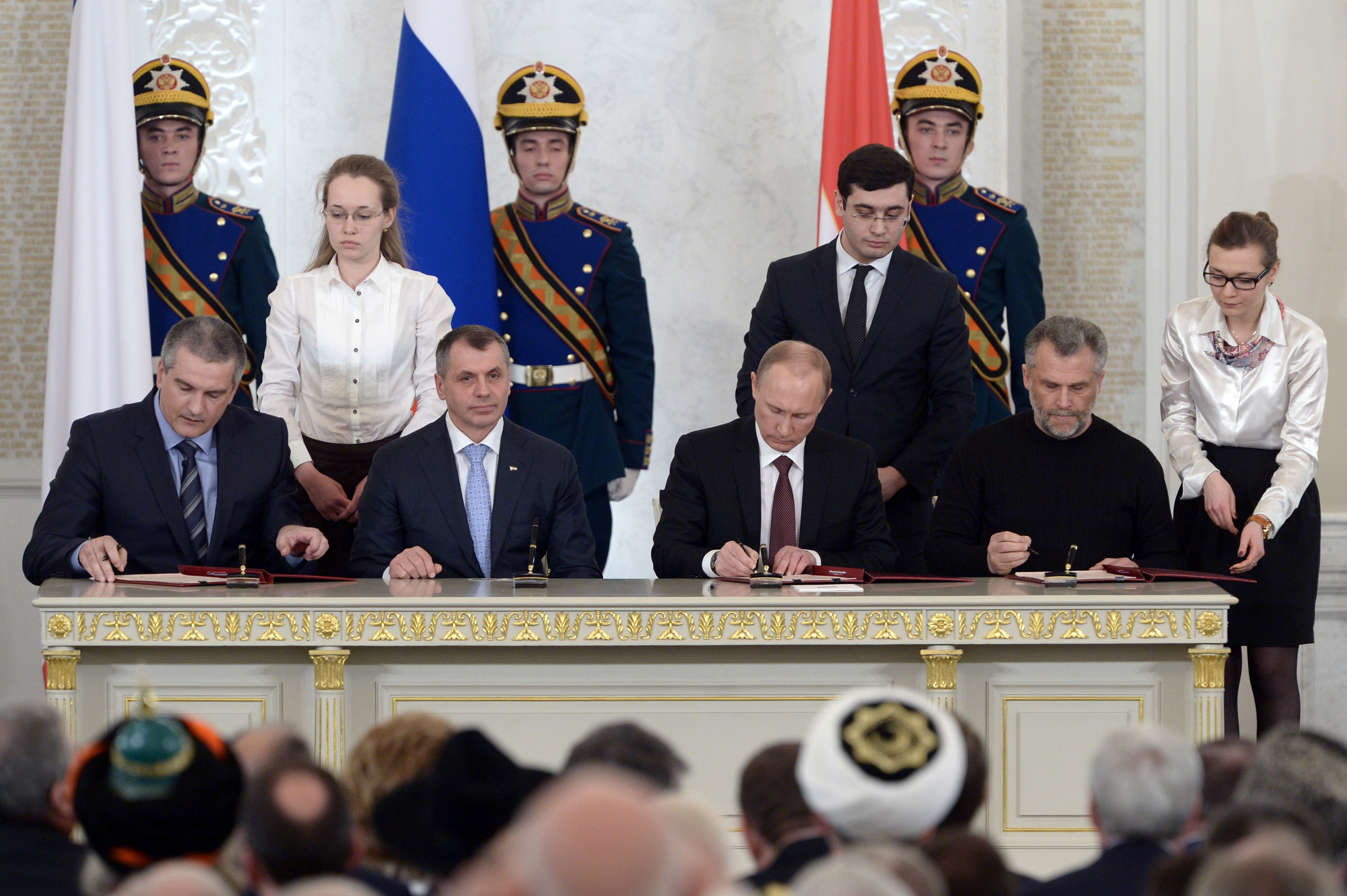
Russian president Vladimir Putin signing the treaty of the Annexation of Crimea by the Russian Federation with Crimean leaders.

After the Russian military invasion that resulted in Ukrainian control over the Crimean peninsula and parts of the Donetsk and Luhansk oblasts being lost, the situation regarding the Crimean peninsula is more complex since Russia annexed the territory in March 2014 and now administers it as two federal subjects – the Republic of Crimea and the federal city of Sevastopol. Ukraine continues to claim Crimea as an integral part of its territory, supported by most foreign governments and United Nations General Assembly Resolution 68/262, although Russia and some other UN member states recognize Crimea as part of the Russian Federation or have expressed support for the 2014 Crimean status referendum.

In 2015, the Ukrainian parliament officially set 20 February 2014 as the date of "the beginning of the temporary occupation of Crimea and Sevastopol by Russia", with 7% of Ukraine's territory under occupation.

=== Invasion of Ukraine (2022–present) ===
Regions of Ukraine annexed by Russia in 2014 and 2022, with a red line marking the area of actual control by Russia on 30 September 2022.

In February 2022, Russia launched a full-scale invasion of Ukraine after recognizing the Donetsk People's Republic and the Luhansk People's Republic as independent states. Russian president Putin ordered Russian forces to "perform peacekeeping functions" in Ukraine on 22 February, and then to begin a "special military operation" on 24 February, making it illegal to refer to the biggest European conflict since WWII as a "war" in Russia. As of October 2022, Russia occupies parts of Donetsk Oblast, Kharkiv Oblast, Kherson Oblast, Luhansk Oblast, Mykolaiv Oblast, Zaporizhzhia Oblast, and all of the Crimean peninsula with its armed forces, its mercenary groups like Wagner, Chechen Kadyrovites, and Russian-led separatists of the DPR and LPR. The invasion is sometimes seen as part of contemporary Russian imperialism.

In September, the Ukrainian army recaptured almost all of Kharkiv Oblast.

Russia held annexation referendums in occupied territories of Ukraine from 23 September to 27 September. On 30 September, Putin signed treaties with the Russian-appointed heads of the DPR, LPR, Kherson, and Zaporizhzhia regions to be integrated into Russia, and their annexation was approved by the Russian constitutional court and ratified by the Russian Federation Council, although the newly claimed borders of the Russian Federation are yet to be determined.

== See also ==
- Post-Soviet conflicts
- International recognition of the Donetsk People's Republic and the Luhansk People's Republic
- Cold War II
- Russian imperialism
- List of military occupations
- Military history of the Russian Federation
- Estonian–Russian territorial dispute
- Kuril Islands dispute
