= UOC =

UOC or UoC may refer to:

== Universities ==
- University of Calgary, Canada
- University of Cambridge, England
- University of Canterbury, New Zealand
- Cardiff University, Wales
- Open University of Catalonia (Catalan: Universitat Oberta de Catalunya), Spain
- University of Chakwal, Pakistan
- University of Chester, England
- University of Chicago, United States
- University of Chichester, England
- University of Cincinnati, United States
- University of Cologne, Germany
- University of Colombo, Sri Lanka
- Coventry University, England
- Cranfield University, England
- University of Crete, Greece
- University of Cumbria, England
- University of Curaçao, Curaçao
- University of Cyberjaya, Malaysia

== Other uses ==
- Union of Cossacks
- Unity of Command (video game), 2011 video game
- Ukrainian Orthodox Church (disambiguation)
- Waco UOC, an American sesquiplane
