= Victor Catan =

Moldovan politician (born 1949)

Major general Victor Catan OR
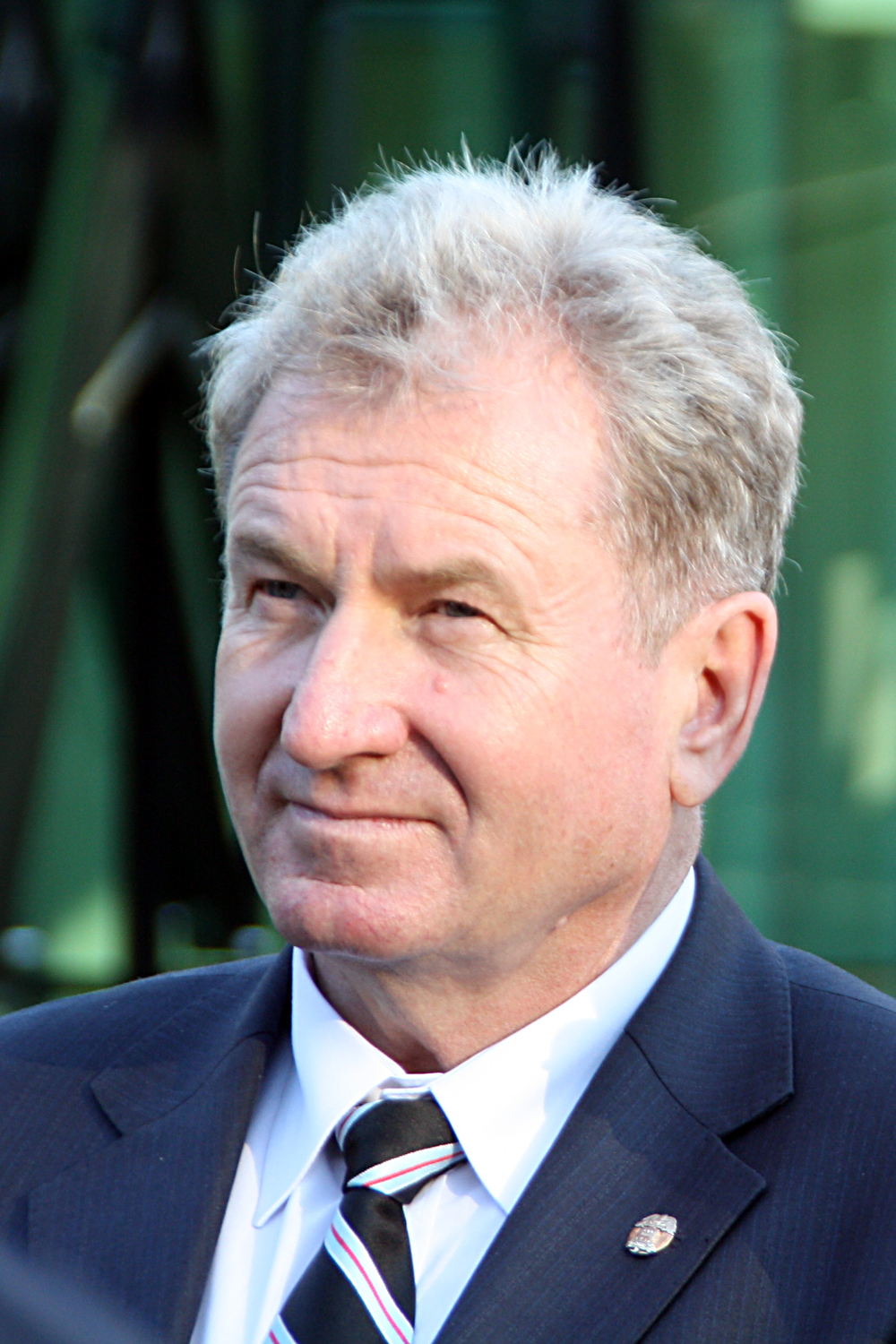
- Catan in 2010

Minister of Internal Affairs
- In office 25 September 2009 – 14 January 2011
- President: Mihai Ghimpu (acting); Vladimir Filat (acting); Marian Lupu (acting)
- Prime Minister: Vladimir Filat
- Preceded by: Gheorghe Papuc
- Succeeded by: Alexei Roibu
- In office 22 May 1998 – 12 November 1999
- President: Petru Lucinschi
- Prime Minister: Ion Ciubuc; Ion Sturza
- Preceded by: Mihail Plămădeală
- Succeeded by: Vladimir Ţurcan

Deputy Minister of Justice
- In office 29 May 1997 – 22 May 1998
- President: Petru Lucinschi
- Prime Minister: Ion Ciubuc
- Minister: Vasile Sturza

First Deputy Minister of Internal Affairs
- In office 16 July 1996 – 11 February 1997
- President: Mircea Snegur; Petru Lucinschi
- Prime Minister: Andrei Sangheli; Ion Ciubuc
- Minister: Constantin Antoci; Mihail Plămădeală

Personal details
- Born: 17 August 1949 (age 77) Druţa, Moldavian SSR, Soviet Union
- Party: Liberal Democratic Party of Moldova; Alliance for European Integration (2009–present)
- Other political affiliations: Alliance for Democracy and Reforms
- Profession: Jurist

Military service
- Rank: Major General

Victor Catan (born 17 August 1949) is a Moldovan politician. He has held the position of minister in the Ministry of Internal Affairs of Moldova twice.

== Biography ==
Victor Catan is a Major General of Police in the Republic of Moldova and served as a Minister of Internal Affairs in the Government of the Republic of Moldova (22 May 1998 – 12 November 1999 and 25 September 2009 – 14 January 2011).

Catan was born on 17 August 1949 in the village of Druța (pronounced "Drutza") in the region of Rîșcani of the Republic of Moldova. He commenced his activities as an electronic technician in 1967. After military service, he graduated from the Special Militia School of the Ministry of Internal Affairs of the USSR in Chișinău (1970–1972).

After graduation, he worked as an inspector of the economic and state treasury police department of the internal affairs section in Anenii Noi in the Republic of Moldova (1972–1976) and afterwards as an inspector, senior inspector and Chief of the economic and public treasury police department of the Internal Affairs section in Bender (aka Tighina) (1976–1985). Parallel to professional activities, Catan graduated in 1981 from the Supreme School of the Ministry of Internal Affairs of the USSR in Kiev, with a major in law.

Between 1985 and 1990 he was appointed as an operational head, senior operational head and later chief of the section of the General Directorate for the prevention of economic crimes and crimes against public treasury of the Ministry of Internal Affairs in Moscow. A promotion followed first to the position of chief of the General Directorate for the prevention of economic crimes and crimes against the public treasury of the Ministry of Internal Affairs of the Republic of Moldova (1990–1991), then to the position of chief of Economic Police Directorate of the Ministry of Internal affairs in the Republic of Moldova (1991–1992).

In February 1992, Catan was appointed secretary of state with rights of vice-prime minister of the Internal Affairs of the Republic of Moldova, and in December of the same year he was appointed vice-prime minister and chief of the Department for Public Security of the Ministry of Internal Affairs. He was promoted to a special degree of a "major general of police", by Presidential Decree nr.211 of 24 June 1994. On 11 February 1997 he was revoked from position of Prime-viceminister of the internal affairs and appointed Viceminister of Justice (1997–1998).

During the period 22 May 1998 to 12 November 1999, Major General of Police Victor Catan acted as a Minister of Internal Affairs of the Government of the Republic of Moldova. After this position he worked as Chief of the department of the Office for the Implementation of the First Cadastral Project (2000–2002).

Catan's candidacy was submitted for the position of deputy in the Parliament of the Republic of Moldova in the 25 February 2001 election on the list of the Renaissance and Conciliation Party of Moldova, but this political party has not obtained enough electoral support to participate in the elections. Starting from 2002 Catan was teaching at the Property Law Faculty at the Technical University in Moldova as a university professor.

In the period 25 September 2009 – 14 January 2011, General Catan served as Minister of Internal Affairs in the government led by Mr. Vlad Filat. He is also member of the Liberal Democrat Party of the Republic of Moldova.

As an appreciation for his military merits, Catan was decorated with the Order Ștefan cel Mare ("Stephen the Great") by presidential decree Number 251 of 17 December 1992. Catan is married and has one child.

He is a member of the Liberal Democratic Party of Moldova.
