= Igor Arhirii =

Moldovan professional footballer

Personal information
- Date of birth: 17 February 1997 (age 29)
- Place of birth: Mihailovca, Moldova
- Height: 1.76 m (5 ft 9 in)
- Position: Right-back

Team information
- Current team: Spartanii Sportul
- Number: 24

Senior career*
| Years | Team | Apps | (Gls) |
| 2015–2017 | Zimbru-2 Chișinău | 46 | (1) |
| 2016–2020 | Zimbru Chișinău | 40 | (0) |
| 2020–2022 | Milsami Orhei | 48 | (0) |
| 2022–2023 | 1599 Șelimbăr | 21 | (0) |
| 2023–2024 | Spartanii Selemet | 12 | (0) |
| 2025–2026 | Milsami Orhei | 4 | (0) |
| 2026– | Spartanii Sportul | 0 | (0) |

International career^{‡}
| 2021 | Moldova | 2 | (0) |
- * Club domestic league appearances and goals as of 27 June 2025 ‡ National team caps and goals as of 3 June 2021

Igor Arhirii (born 17 February 1997) is a Moldovan professional footballer who plays as a defender for Moldovan Liga 1 club Spartanii Sportul.

== Club career ==
Arhirii made his professional debut for Zimbru in the Divizia Națională on 25 September 2016 against Ungheni.

== International career ==
He made his debut for Moldova national football team on 28 March 2021 in a World Cup qualifier against Denmark, which Moldova lost 0–8.
