= 1995 Transnistrian Russian troop withdrawal referendum =

Russian Referendum in troops withdrawal

A referendum on the withdrawal of Russian troops was held in Transnistria on 27 March 1995 alongside parliamentary elections. Russian troops had been stationed in Transnistria since the Transnistria War. Over 93% of voted in favour of the troops remaining in the territory.

== Results ==
Choice	Votes	%
For		6.70
Against		93.30
Total		
Source: Direct Democracy
