= Sălcuța, Căușeni =

Sălcuța
- Village
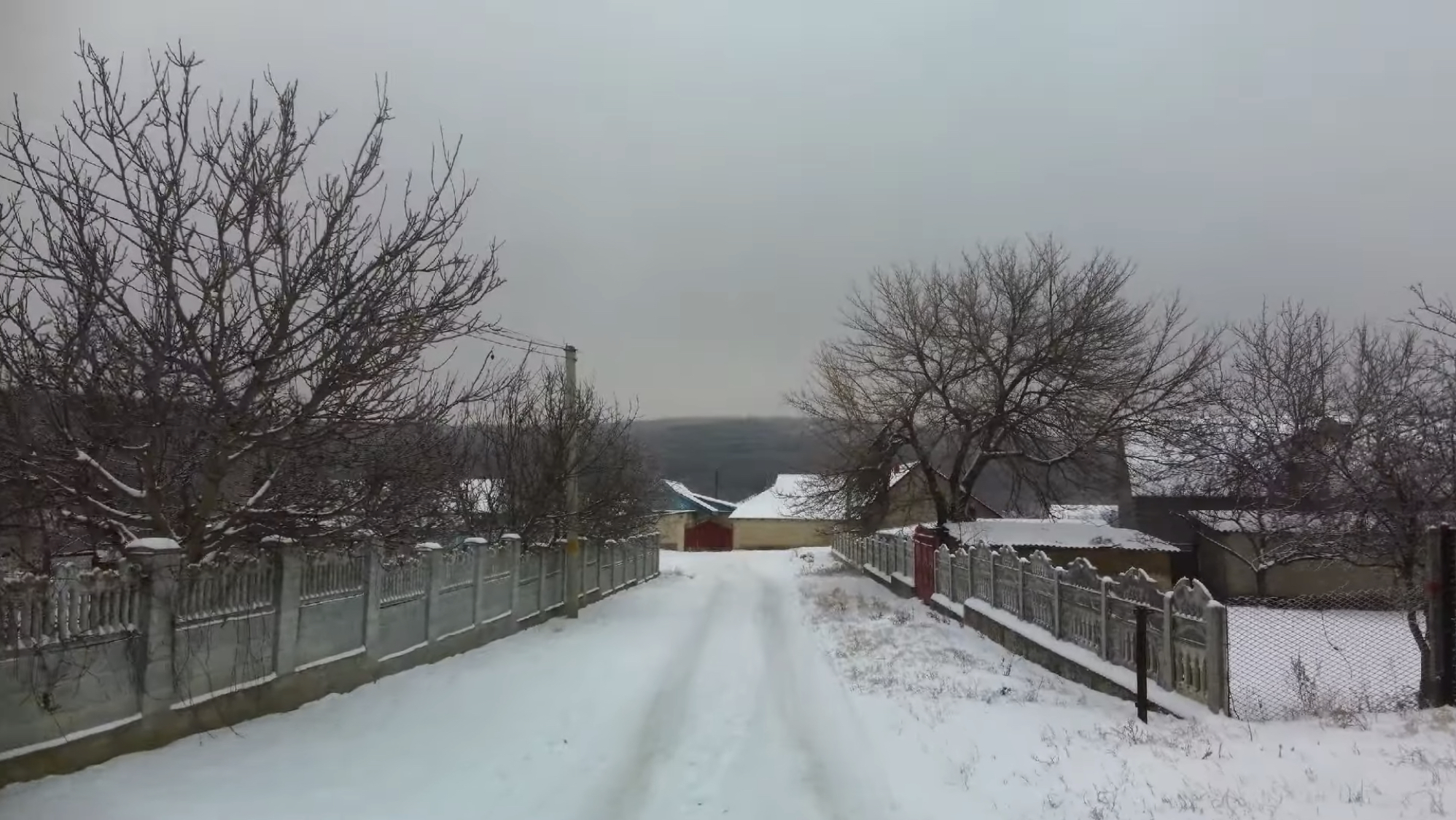

- Location within Moldova
- Coordinates: 46°35′52″N 29°15′08″E
- Country: Moldova
- District: Căușeni District

Government
  - Mayor: Ion Novac (PLDM)

Area
  - Total: 76.8 km^{2} (29.7 sq mi)
- Elevation: 55 m (180 ft)

Population (2014 census)
  - Total: 4,360
- Time zone: UTC+2 (EET)
  - Summer (DST): UTC+3 (EEST)

Sălcuța is a village in Căușeni District, Moldova.

== Geography ==
The village is located in the south-eastern part of the country, about 3 km as the crow flies from the border with Ukraine. In the area immediately north of the village flows the river Botna, a tributary of the Dnestr and the sixth river in Moldova in order of length.

=== Climate ===
The climate of the area can be classified as continental and has strong seasonal temperature variations, with temperatures that can reach 40 °C in summer and drop to -25 °C in winter.

== Notable people ==
- Pavel Creangă, military officer and former Minister of Defense of Moldova
- Grigore Novac, politician and jurist
