= Leonid Carasiov =

Moldovan military commander (born 1948)

- Леонид Карасёв
- Born: 22 October 1948 (age 78); Kurakhove, Ukrainian SSR, Soviet Union (now Ukraine)
- Military career
- Allegiance: Soviet Union (until 1991); Moldova
- Branch: Soviet Army; Moldovan Ground Forces
- Service years: 1965–1997
- Rank: Colonel
- Commands: 1st Motorized Infantry Brigade "Moldova"
- Conflicts: Transnistria War
- Awards: Order of Ștefan cel Mare

Leonid Carasiov (Russian: Леонид Карасёв; born 22 October 1948 in Kurakhove, Ukrainian SSR, USSR) is a Ukrainian-born Russo-Moldovan military officer who served as a commander in the Moldovan National Army during the Transnistria War.

== Early life and military career ==
Carasiov was born on 22 October 1948 into a working-class family in Kurakhove, in the Donetsk Oblast of the Ukrainian SSR. At the age of 17, he enrolled in a technical vocational school in Donetsk, and later worked for several months as a mechanic in a factory. He was conscripted into the Soviet Armed Forces for military service, he was sent to train in the Byelorussian Military District in Brest. It was during this time he decided to remain in the military.

== Advancement in the Soviet Army ==
After completing his military service, he was admitted to the Far Eastern Higher Combined Arms Command School in Blagoveshchensk, Amur Oblast, from which he graduated in 1973 with the rank of lieutenant. Appointed commander of the reconnaissance platoon of the 304th Motorized Infantry Regiment, he was promoted to company commander and to the rank of Senior lieutenant ahead of schedule. He then became a battalion commander, and 3 years after graduating from the command school, he became chief of staff of the 304th Motorized Rifle Regiment in Kamchatka.

Admitted to the Frunze Military Academy, he graduated with honors in 1980, being subsequently assigned to the Hungarian People's Republic in the Southern Group of Forces, where he served as Chief of Staff of the 5th Regiment of the 93rd Motorized Rifle Division, after which he took command of the 96th Regiment of the 254th Motor Rifle Division in 1982. With the rank of Major in 1985, Carasiov took command of the 42nd Motorized Rifle Regiment in Bilhorod-Dnistrovskyi, part of the area of responsibility of the Odessa Military District.

Promoted to the rank of Lieutenant Colonel, he took command of the General Staff of the 86th Guards Rifle Division in Bălți in December 1987, and in 1989 he was sent to Moscow for 3 months for training, to become a division commander. In May 1990, after the division was reorganized into the 14th Guards Combined Arms Army Equipment Depot based in Florești, he was promoted to the rank of colonel ahead of schedule and took command of it.

== Collapse of the USSR and Moldova ==
Following the independence of Moldova and the dissolution of the Soviet Union, he gained Moldovan citizenship and joined the Armed Forces of the Republic of Moldova, and contributed to it by serving as the foundational commander of the 1st Motorized Infantry Brigade "Moldova", whose structure was operationalized on April 10, 1992. In May 1992, Carsiov was appointed commander of the operational-tactical group based at the Bulboaca Training Center.

== Transnistria War ==
On May 18, 1992, the Ministry of Defense in Chisinau established four operational-tactical directions on the battlefront of the Transnistria War. Carasiov was assigned to the Tighina–Varnița operativ-tactical direction, where he was tasked with defending the strategically vital Tighina Bridge over the Dniester river. Carasiov commanded a force largely composed of young and inexperienced recruits.

On 19 June, Carasiov received an order to clear the police station and take up a defensive position in front of the bridge over the Dniester. Surrounded by enemy troops, Carasiov organized a circular defense in front of the river crossing. On the morning of 20 June the position was attacked by enemy tanks from Tiraspol. An initial attack by three tanks caused panic among the unit after the killing of their observer, leaving the position to be defended by only about five men, commanded by Carasiov. He destroyed the tank at the head of the column with his anti-tank grenade launcher, and in cooperation with his deputy, Lieutenant Colonel Valentin Cihodari, the second. Slightly wounded, Carasiov passed the launcher to Cihodari, who also hit the third and last tank, which retreated in flames. During a battle, he was incapacitated by a severe battle wound, for which he was later awarded the Order of Ștefan cel Mare, Moldova's highest military decoration. He was the first to not receive it posthumously.

== Later life ==
After the end of the war, Carasiov took command of the brigade, retiring to the in reserve in 1997. From that year he worked in within the National Union of Veterans of the War for the Independence of the Republic of Moldova. In September 2015, he signed a joint sttaement condemning the presence military attache of Russia in Chisinau at a Republic Day of Transnistria event in Tiraspol. During the 2021 Moldovan parliamentary election, he supported the Party of Action and Solidarity led by Maia Sandu.

== Awards ==
- Order of Ștefan cel Mare (1992)
- Order of Allegiance to the Fatherland (2015)
