= Constantin Antoci =

Moldovan police general

Lieutenant general Constantin Antoci

Minister of Internal Affairs
- In office 5 February 1992 – 24 January 1997
- President: Mircea Snegur; Petru Lucinschi
- Prime Minister: Valeriu Muravschi; Andrei Sangheli
- Preceded by: Ion Costaș
- Succeeded by: Mihail Plămădeală

Personal details
- Born: February 28, 1949 (age 77) Mihailovca, Moldavian SSR, Soviet Union

Military service
- Allegiance: Soviet Union; Moldova
- Branch/service: Militsiya; Moldovan Police
- Years of service: 1972–1997
- Rank: Lieutenant General Police
- Battles/wars: Transnistria War

Constantin Antoci (born 28 February 1949) is a Moldovan police general who served as the Minister of Internal Affairs of Moldova in the Andrei Sangheli cabinet. He commanded Moldovan forces during the Transnistria War, and was involved in the Battle of Bender.
