= Pavel Creangă =

Moldovan politician (1933–2004)

Minister of Defense
- In office 29 July 1992 – 24 January 1997
- President: Mircea Snegur; Petru Lucinschi
- Prime Minister: Andrei Sangheli
- Preceded by: Ion Costaș
- Succeeded by: Valeriu Pasat

Deputy Minister of Defense
- In office 27 May 1992 – 29 July 1992
- President: Mircea Snegur
- Prime Minister: Valeriu Muravschi
- Minister: Ion Costaș

Personal details
- Born: 26 October 1933 Sălcuța, Kingdom of Romania
- Died: 19 January 2004 (aged 70) Chișinău, Moldova

Military service
- Allegiance: USSR (1952-1991); Moldova (1991-1997)
- Branch/service: Soviet Army; Moldovan Ground Forces
- Years of service: 1952-1997
- Rank: Divisional general

Pavel Creangă (26 October 1933 – 19 January 2004) was a Moldovan military general who served as the Minister of Defense of Moldova from 1992 to 1997.

== Early life and career ==
Creangă was born on 26 October 1933 in Sălcuța, Kingdom of Romania. He is a relative of Constantin Căldare. He began his career as a school teacher in the village of Tocuz in the Căușeni District. In 1952, he joined the Soviet Army. He was first a student at the Far Eastern Higher Combined Arms Command School in Blagoveshchensk, Amur Oblast and then at the Malinovsky Military Armored Forces Academy. He graduated in 1960, serving as a platoon commander until 1964, then as a company commander (1964-1967), a battalion commander (1967-1973), a division commander (1973-1979) before becoming Deputy Commander of the Army in Belarus, then in Afghanistan (1979-1986). He was also a Military Advisor to the Deputy Minister of the Cuban Revolutionary Armed Forces (1986-1988). He left the Soviet Army with the rank of Major General.

== Moldovan National Army ==
He led Moldovan forces during the Transnistria War and was involved in the defense of Tighina during the battle for the town. He was appointed by President Mircea Snegur on May 27, 1992, to the position of Deputy Minister of Defense.

=== Defence Minister ===
On July 29, 1992, he was appointed as Minister of Defense, succeeding Ion Costaș. He held the rank of Lieutenant general. In March 1996, Snegur attempted to dismiss Creangă via presidential decree after Creangă refused to use the military to campaign for Snegur in the 1996 Moldovan presidential election due for November of that year, as Creangă maintained that the Armed Forces of Moldova must remain apolitical. As a result, a standoff occurred inside the Ministry of Defence building when Major General Tudor Dabija-Cazarov, who was unlawfully appointed as his replacement, tried to enter the building. The Constitutional Court of Moldova ultimately ruled Snegur's dismissal unconstitutional, ordering him to reinstate Creangă. After his reinstatement, Snegur took many of the functions of Defence Minister in his role of Supreme Commander-in-Chief. He served in this position until January 25, 1997.

== Later life ==
He was put into reserve with the rank of division general. President Petru Lucinschi awarded him the Order of Stephen the Great on March 14, 2001. He died on 19 January 2004 in Chișinău.
