= Mihail Plămădeală =

Moldovan jurist and politician

Major general Mihail Plămădeală

Member of the Moldovan Parliament
- In office 13 March 2001 – 9 October 2003
- Succeeded by: Iacob Popovici
- Parliamentary group: Braghiș Alliance

Defense and National Security Advisor to the President – Secretary of the Supreme Security Council
- In office 5 June 1998 – 10 February 2000
- President: Petru Lucinschi
- Preceded by: Gheorghe Cîrlan
- Succeeded by: Adrian Usatîi

Minister of Internal Affairs
- In office 24 January 1997 – 22 May 1998
- President: Petru Lucinschi
- Prime Minister: Ion Ciubuc
- Preceded by: Constantin Antoci
- Succeeded by: Victor Catan

Personal details
- Born: February 20, 1945 (age 81) Pitușca, Moldavian SSR, Soviet Union

Mihail Plămădeală (born 20 February 1945) is a Moldovan jurist and politician. He held the office of Minister of Internal Affairs of Moldova in the late 1990s.
