= Tudor Dabija-Cazarov =

- Born: 1942
- Died: 1999 (aged 56–57)
- Allegiance: Moldova
- Branch: Moldovan Ground Forces
- Rank: Major General
- Conflicts: Transnistria War

Tudor Dabija-Cazarov is a Moldovan military officer.

He was born in 1942. He attained the rank of Major general on March 5, 1992. That same day, by order of Minister of Defence Ion Costaș, Cazarov, who had previously held the position of military commissar, was appointed as the head of the Chisinau Garrison. He was appointed by Order No. 83 on 27 May 1992 as Deputy Minister of Defense of Moldova. By Presidential Decree No. 59 of 27 February 1997, the President of the Republic of Moldova dismissed Cazarov from his position as Deputy Minister of Defense.

In March 1996, he was involved in a standoff inside the Ministry of Defence building when he, who was unlawfully appointed by President Mircea Snegur to replace Lieutenant General Pavel Creangă as Minister of Defence, tried to enter the building.

He died in 1999.
