= Grigore Novac =

Moldovan politician (born 1983)

Grigore Novac MP
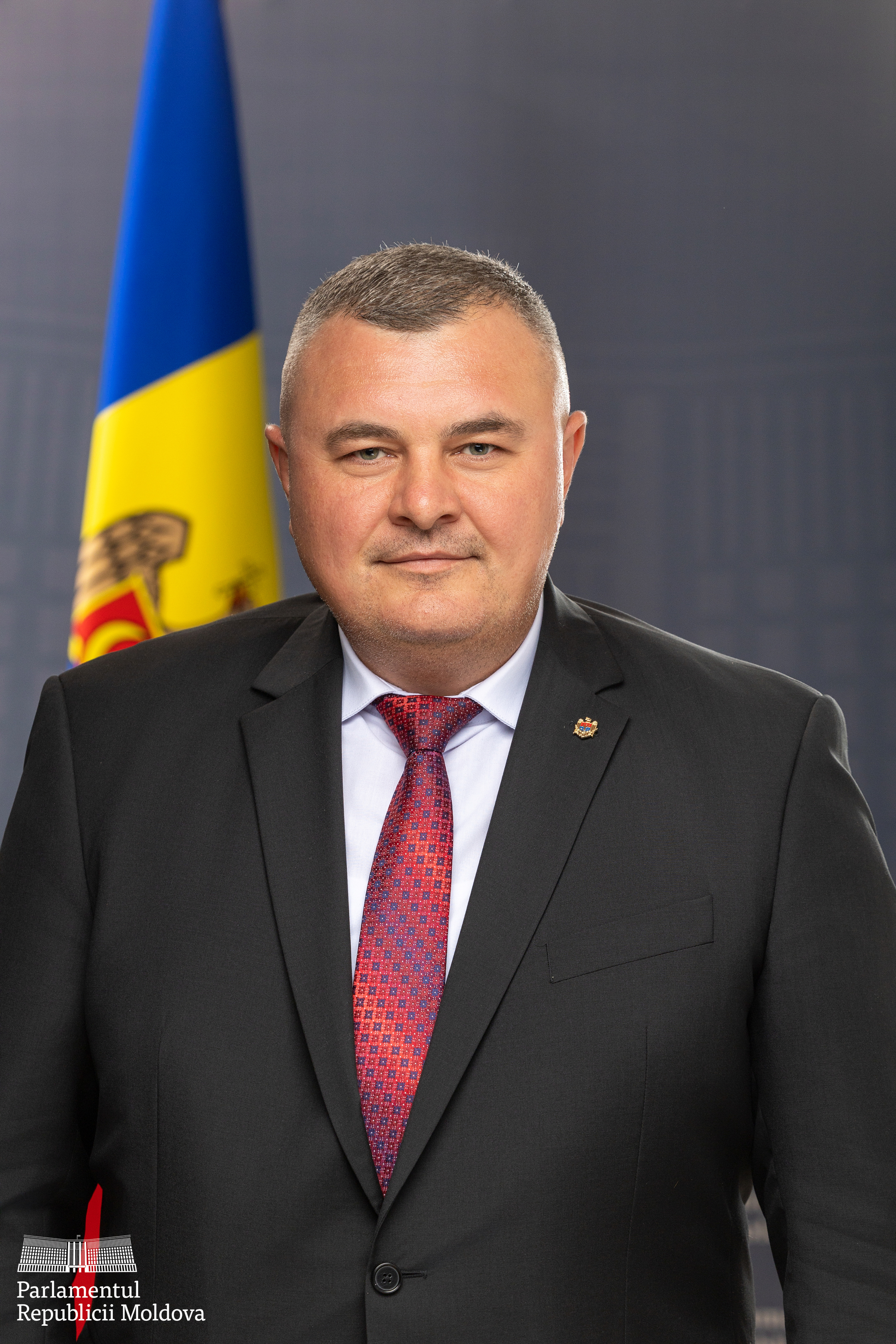
- Official portrait, 2025

Member of the Moldovan Parliament
- Incumbent
- Assumed office 9 December 2014
- Parliamentary group: Party of Socialists; Bloc of Communists and Socialists

Personal details
- Born: 6 February 1983 (age 43) Sălcuța, Moldavian SSR, Soviet Union
- Education: Moldova State University

Grigore Novac (born 6 February 1983) is a Moldovan jurist and politician. Since December 2014, he has served as Member of the Moldovan Parliament. He is the chair of the parliamentary Committee for Human Rights and Interethnic Relations.
