= Ion Costaș =

Moldovan politician (born 1944)

Divisional general Ion Costaș
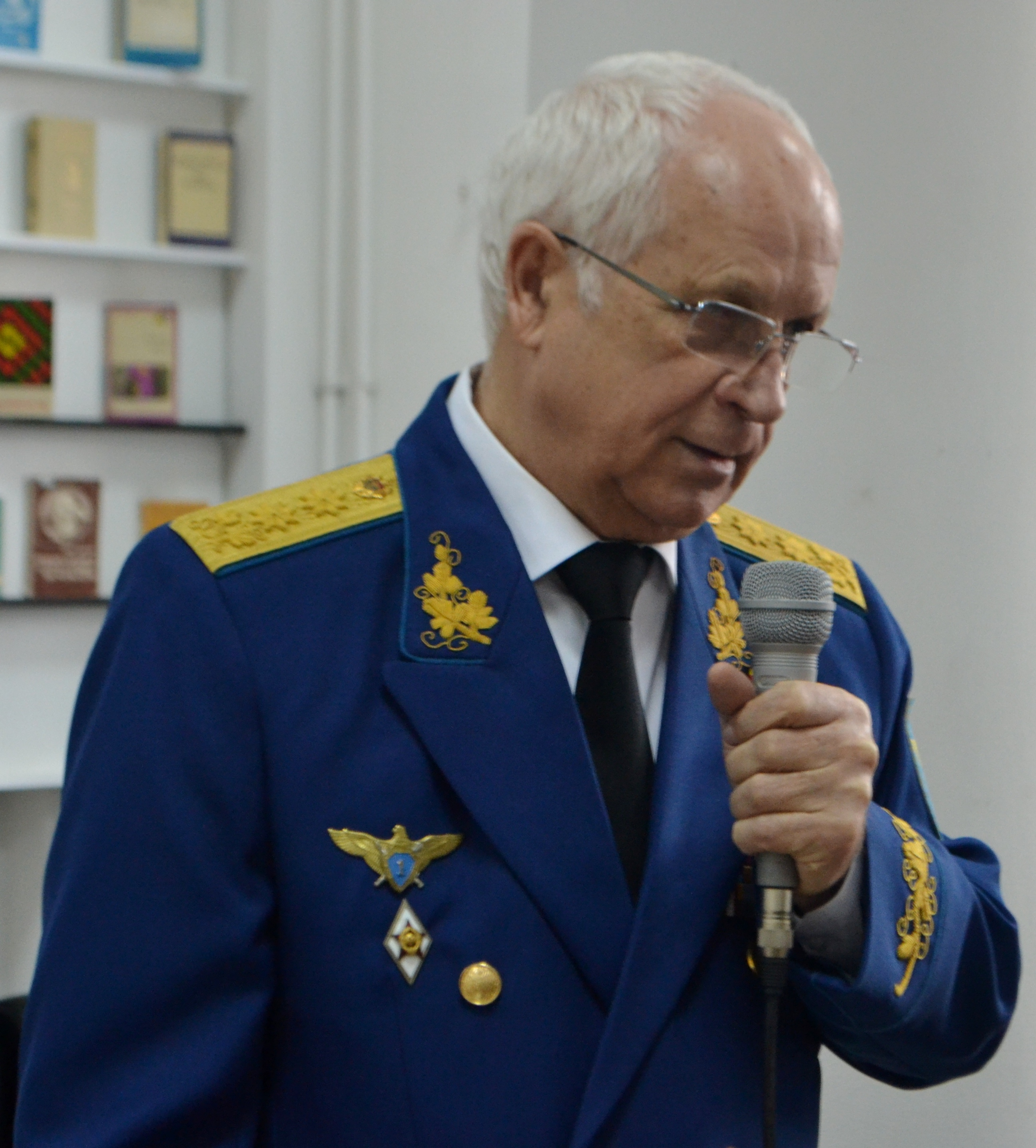
- Costaș in 2016

1st Minister of Defense
- In office 5 February 1992 – 29 July 1992
- President: Mircea Snegur
- Prime Minister: Valeriu Muravschi; Andrei Sangheli
- Succeeded by: Pavel Creangă

1st Minister of Internal Affairs
- In office 3 June 1990 – 5 February 1992
- President: Mircea Snegur
- Prime Minister: Mircea Druc; Valeriu Muravschi
- Preceded by: Vladimir Voronin (as Minister of Internal Affairs of the Moldavian SSR)
- Succeeded by: Constantin Antoci

Personal details
- Born: 22 February 1944 (age 82) Țarigrad, Moldavian SSR, Soviet Union
- Education: Higher Military Aviation School from Kharkiv (1967); Gagarin Air Force Academy in Moscow (1976)
- Occupation: Military

Military service
- Branch/service: Soviet Air Forces; Moldovan National Army
- Years of service: 1967–1993
- Rank: Division general
- Battles/wars: Transnistria War

Ion Costaș (born 22 February 1944) is a Soviet and Moldovan military officer and a former minister of interior (1990–1992) and Defence (1992). He is a leader of the Democratic Forum of Romanians in Moldova.

== Early life and career ==
Costaș was born in 1944 in the village of Țarigrad, Drochia District. He comes from a family of Bessarabian Romanians from northern Bessarabia. His father, a sergeant in the Romanian Army, fell prisoner of the Soviet Army at the Don. He returned to his family in 1948, and soon after, with his whole family, in 1949, they were deported to Siberia, then resettled in the steppes of Kazakhstan, to the mines of Karaganda. They returned in 1958. After graduating from the Russian secondary school in Drochia, he continued his studies in Kharkiv, in the Ukrainian Soviet Socialist Republic, at the Higher Military Aviation School (now the Ivan Kozhedub National Air Force University), which he graduated with honors. He received a diploma of military pilot on supersonic aircraft and a diploma of aviation engineer. After graduating full-time from the Command Faculty of the Gagarin Air Force Academy with a gold medal, he was appointed commander of a MIG-25RB aviation regiment in East Berlin, East Germany, then deputy and commander of a fighter-bomber aviation division in Transbaikal Military District in Chita, Zabaykalsky Krai from 1979-1981.

He then studied at the Military Academy of the General Staff, which he graduated with honors. After graduating from this institution in the Soviet Army, with great difficulty he obtained an assignment for military service in the Moldovan SSR in 1983, as deputy commander of the 14th Army for aviation issues. He was, at that time, one of the youngest generals (at 40 years old) in the Soviet Armed Forces. From 1985-1989, he was Chairman of the Moldavian SSR Committee for Pre-Military Training of Youth for DOSAAF. He was promoted in October 1988 to Major-General of the Soviet Army.

== Moldovan government ==
=== Interior Minister ===
From 1990 to 1992 he was Minister of Internal Affairs in the Government of Moldova. During this period he established the Trupele de Carabinieri on December 12, 1991, a 10,000 man force on the basis of the Internal Troops of the Ministry of Internal Affairs of the Moldovan SSR.

=== Defence Minister ===
On 5 February 1992 Costaș became the first Minister of Defence of Moldova. He was later dismissed, after which he was then appointed as military attaché in Romania, where he was recalled in October 1993.

== Post government ==
He retired from politics in 1993. He later became the general manager of Crystal System, an international group specialized in Information Technology. He was previously a regional manager for Hewlett Packard and for the Petrom, a large Romanian oil company. From 1998-1999, he was Representative in the member countries of the Commonwealth of Independent States. Plenipotentiary of the Ministry of Industry and Trade of Romania from 1994-1998. He led the contingent of veterans of the Transnistrian War on Great National Assembly Square during the 2011 Chișinău Independence Day Parade.

In February 2011, General Ion Costaş's book "Days of Eclipse. Chronicle of an Undeclared War" was launched in Chisinau.

== Politics ==
Costaș supports the unification of the Republic of Moldova with Romania. He believes that Romania could make a territory exchange with Ukraine for the reunification of Greater Romania (Romania should cede Transnistria in exchange for Northern Bukovina, Herța Land, Hotin and Bugea). He is also an advocate for Moldovan membership in NATO.

In 2020 Costaș announced that he would run in the 2020 Moldovan presidential election as an independent candidate because there was no party "for the country and for the nation". He submitted the necessary documents for his participation to the Central Election Commission of Moldova (CEC) on 2 September. However, on 29 September, Costaș announced that he would withdraw his candidacy due to the "violation by state institutions of the constitutional provisions regarding the election of the president" and urged other candidates to do the same.

== Personal life ==
He speaks native Romanian and Russian, as well as limited German and English.

== See also ==
- War of Transnistria
- Timeline of events in the War of Transnistria
- Moldovan parliamentary election from 1990
