= Union of Cossacks =

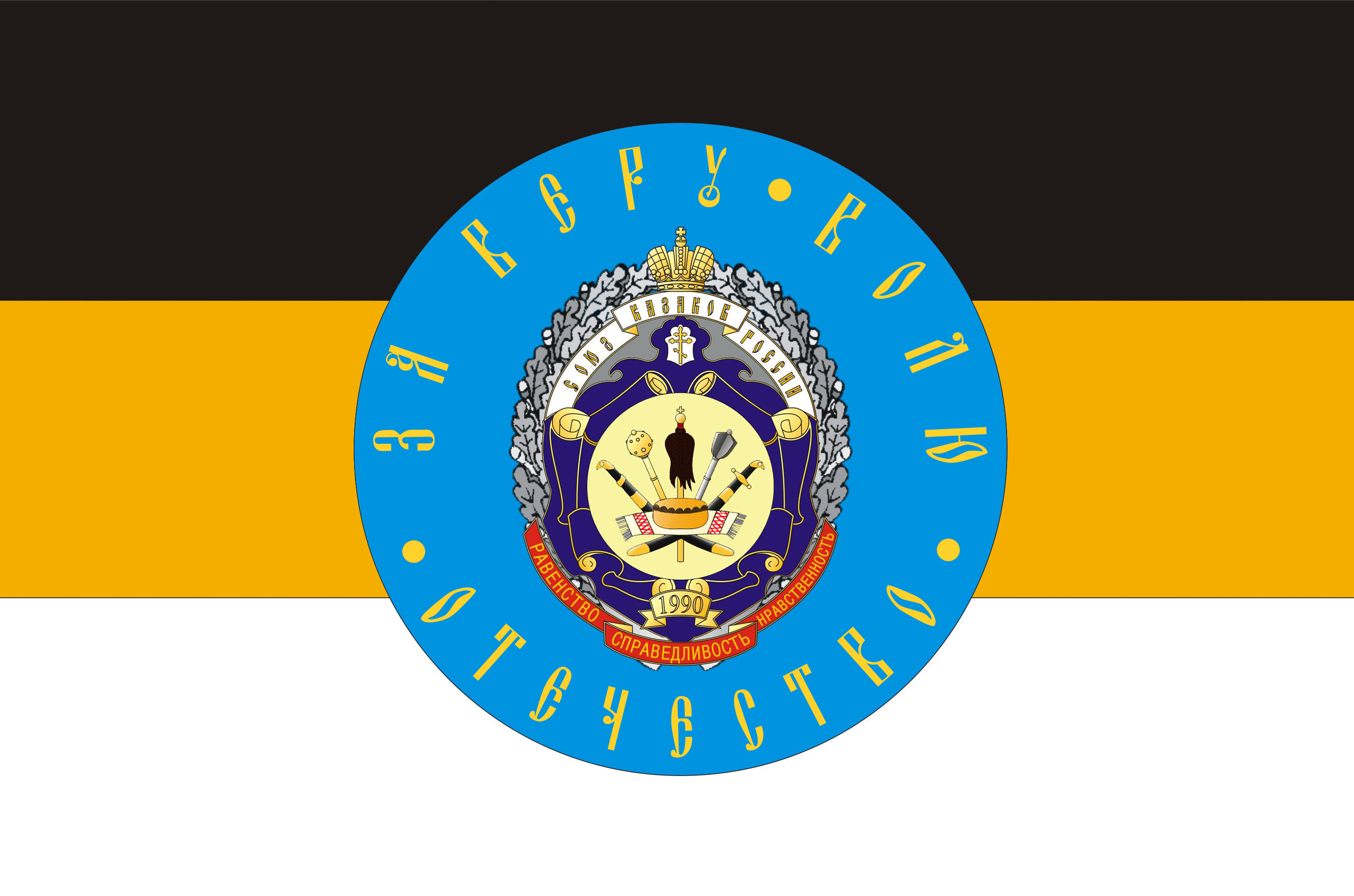
- Flag
- Founded: 28 June 1990
- Country: Russia
- Allegiance: Transnistria

The Union of Cossacks (UoC) is a movement and armed organization of Russian and Central Asian cossacks established at a conference in Moscow on 28 June 1990, which sought to unite the Cossack forces of the earlier Russian Empire. The UoC defined itself as pro-communist, in contrast with the Union of Cossack Hosts whose stance favored the Russian Federation and opposed communism.

The force was sent to Transnistria to fight as volunteers in the Transnistria War from 2 November 1990 to 21 July 1992.
