= Vladimir Rilyakov =

Transnistrian politician

- Владимир Рыляков

Member of the Supreme Council of the Pridnestrovian Moldavian Republic
- In office 1990–2005

Member of the Supreme Soviet of the Moldavian Soviet Socialist Republic
- In office April 1990 – 1993

Personal details
- Born: Vladimir Markovich Rilyakov; 7 July 1947 (age 78) Tiraspol, Moldavian SSR, Soviet Union
- Party: Communist Party of the Soviet Union (until 1989); Pridnestrovian Republican Party (2007–2010); Republican Social-Patriotic Party (since 2010)
- Occupation: Politician

Vladimir Markovich Rilyakov (Russian: Владимир Маркович Рыляков; born 7 July 1947) is a Transnistrian politician. He was a member of the Supreme Soviet of the Moldavian Soviet Socialist Republic from 1990 to 1993 and a member of the Supreme Council of the Pridnestrovian Moldavian Republic from 1990 to 2005.

== Early career ==
Vladimir Markovich Rilyakov was born on 7 July 1947 in Tiraspol, Moldavian SSR, Soviet Union. Rilyakov worked at the Elektromash Electronics Concern factory from 1969 to 1990 in various roles and leaders positions. Among those positions, he was the senior foreman and later the head of the workshop and production. While working, he attended the Zaporizhzhia Industrial Technical School from which he graduated in 1984. During perestroika, Rilyakov was the secretary of the factory's communist party committee.

== Political career ==
On 11 August 1989, Rilyakov became the co-chairman of the Tiraspol United Council of Labor Collectives (OSTK), an organization that opposed Moldovan unification with Romania. The Tiraspol OSTK claimed that such unification would lead to the nationality-based discrimination of Moldovan workers, and the organization organized strikes in regions of the Moldavian SSR east of the Dniester river. For Rilyakov's role in establishing the Tiraspol OSTK, he was expelled from the Communist Party of the Soviet Union. After the Supreme Soviet of the Moldavian SSR legalized Moldovan (Romanian) as a state language, Rilyakov led a protest march in Gagauzia.

In April 1990, Rilyakov was elected as a member of the Tiraspol city council, a member of the Tiraspol Council of People's Deputies, and as a member of the Supreme Soviet of the Moldavian SSR. From 1990 to 1992, he was the chairman of the Supreme Soviet's committee for defense and security. He served as the acting chairman of the Tiraspol city council from 1991 to 1992, and as chairman of the Tiraspol Council of People's Deputies from 1992 to 1995. When the Pridnestrovian Moldavian Republic (Transnistria) declared independence in 1990, Rilyakov became a member of the Supreme Council of Transnistria. In July 1995, President Igor Smirnov appointed Rilyakov as Deputy Minister of the Economy and Material Resources of the Transnistria and as the head of the Department of Foreign Economic Activity. He became the chairman of the State Committee for Foreign Economic Relations on 26 February 1997.

Rilyakov ended his tenure as a member of the Supreme Council of Transnistria in 2005. In 2006, he became the leader of the Transnistrian-German Union of Writers. In February 2007, he became the leader of the Pridnestrovian Republican Party. The party merged into the Republican Social-Patriotic Party in January 2010.

== Awards and decorations ==
In 2000, Rilyakov was awarded the Order for Personal Courage. In 2015, Gagauzia governor Mihail Formuzal awarded Rilyakov the Order of Gagauzia for having led the 1990 protest march in the region. In 2022, Transnistrian president Vadim Krasnoselsky awarded Rilyakov the Order of Friendship.
