= Mihailovca, Cimișlia =

Mihailovca
- Village
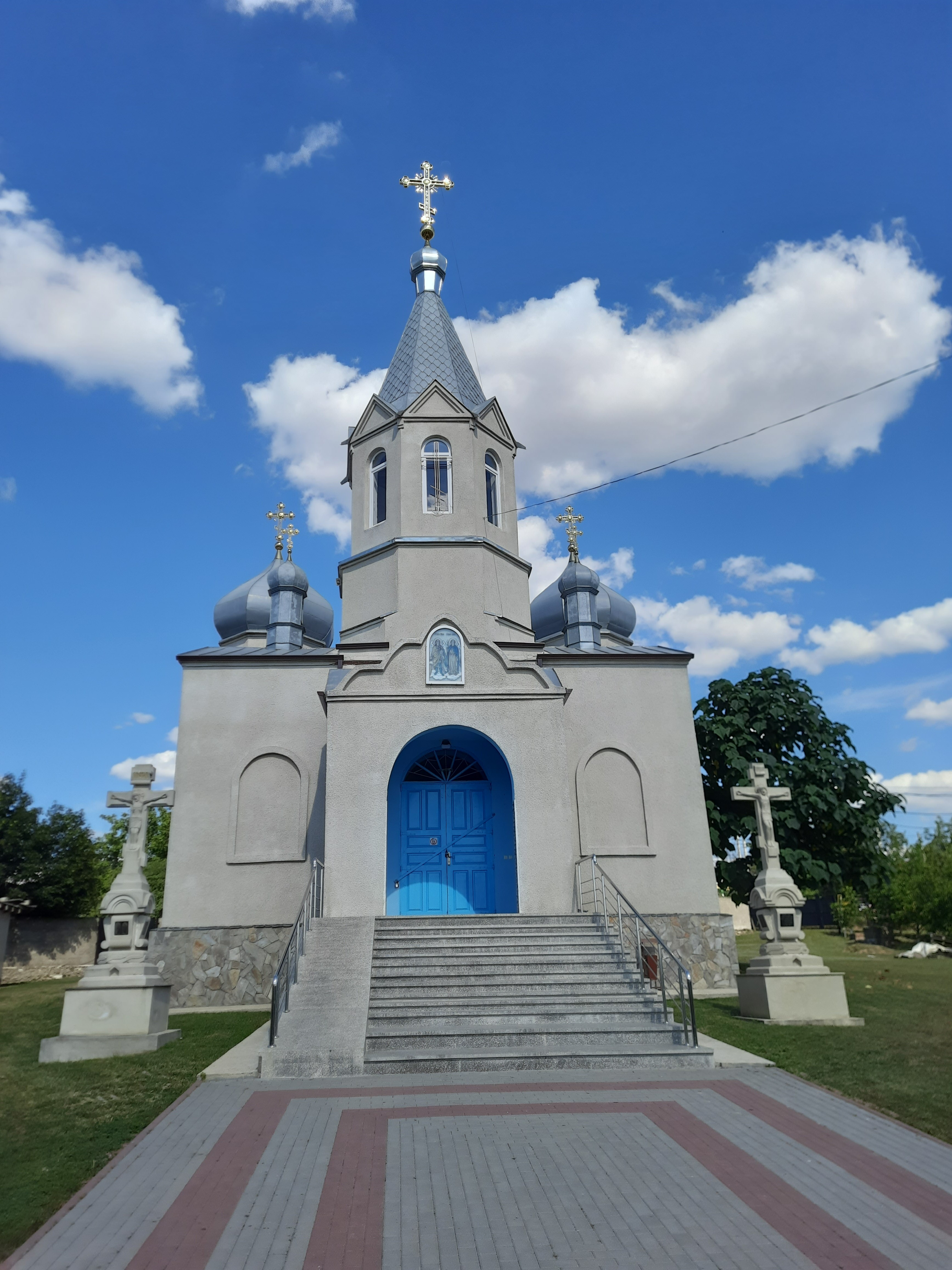
- Church of Archangels Michael and Gabriel, Mihailovca

- Location within Moldova
- Coordinates: 46.5397222222°N 28.9291666667°E
- Country: Moldova
- District: Cimișlia

Government
  - Mayor: Iurie Moraru (PN)

Population (2014 census)
  - Total: 3,126
- Time zone: UTC+2 (EET)
  - Summer (DST): UTC+3 (EEST)

Mihailovca is a village in Cimișlia District, Moldova.
