= Lunga, Transnistria =

Lunga Lunga (Romanian) Лунга (Russian) Лунга (Ukrainian)
- Village
- Location within Moldova
- Coordinates: 47°14′51″N 29°10′24″E
- Country (de jure): Moldova
- Country (de facto): Transnistria (Note: Transnistria's political status is disputed. It considers itself to be an independent state, but this is not recognised by any UN member state. The Moldovan government and the international community consider Transnistria a part of Moldova's territory.)
- Elevation: 26 m (85 ft)
- Time zone: UTC+2 (EET)
  - Summer (DST): UTC+3 (EEST)

Lunga (Moldovan Cyrillic, Russian, and Ukrainian: Лунга), traditionally Lunca (everglade), is a village in the Dubăsari District of Transnistria, Moldova. It has since 1990 been administered as a part of the breakaway Pridnestrovian Moldavian Republic.

According to the 2004 census, the population of the locality was 3,271 inhabitants, of which 2,205 (67.41%) Moldovans (Romanians), 553 (16.9%) Ukrainians and 434 (13.26%) Russians.
