= Transnistrian War =

1990–1992 separatist conflict in Moldova

- Part of the dissolution of the Soviet Union and the Transnistria conflict
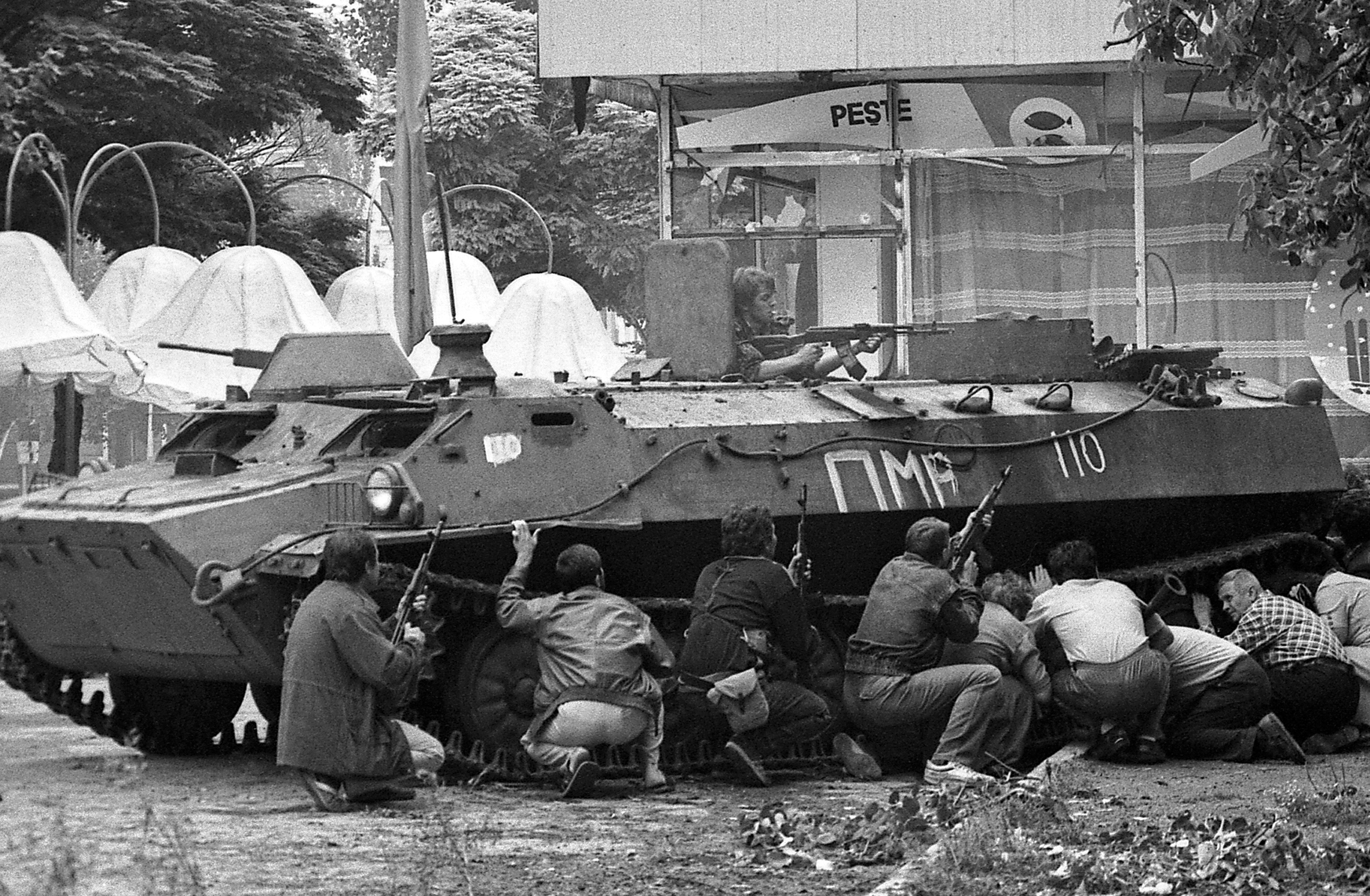
- Separatist forces during the Battle of Bender, the largest battle of the war
Date	2 November 1990 – 21 July 1992 (1 year, 8 months, 2 weeks and 5 days) Main phase: 2 March – 21 July 1992 (4 months, 2 weeks and 5 days)
Location	Transnistria, Moldova
Result	Russian–Transnistrian victory
Territorial changes	Ceasefire agreement signed on 21 July 1992; Moldova constitutionally enshrines its neutral status; Transnistria becomes a de facto independent state, but remains internationally recognized as part of Moldova

Belligerents
/ Moldova (Note: Soviet Socialist Republic of Moldova until 23 May 1991. Constituent republic of the Soviet Union until 27 August 1991.) Supported by: Romania	Transnistria; Russia; Supported by: Ukrainian volunteers

Commanders and leaders
Mircea Snegur; Valeriu Muravschi; Ion Costaș; Pavel Creangă; Tudor Dabija-Cazarov; Constantin Antoci; Nicolae Chirtoacă; Leonid Carasiov; Boris Muravschi	Igor Smirnov; Andrey Manoylov; Vladimir Rilyakov; Ștefan Chițac; Nikolay Lepkhov; Vladimir Atamaniuk; Fedor Dobrov; Yuri Grosul; Vladimir Antyufeyev; Tom Zenovich; Boris Yeltsin; (Russia) Alexander Lebed; (Russia) Yuri Netkachev; Dmytro Korchynsky

Units involved
(Moldova) Armed Forces; (Moldova) Ministry of Internal Affairs; Police; Popular Front of Moldova; (Moldova) Pro-government Transnistrian volunteers; Romanian volunteers and military advisors	(Transnistria) Armed Forces; Republican Guard; Ministry of Interior; Militsiya; (Russia) Russian Armed Forces; 14th Guards Army (elements); Russian volunteers; Don Cossacks; Kuban CMS; Orenburg Cossacks; Union of Cossacks; RNU; Gagauz volunteers; / Ukrainian volunteers; UNA-UNSO (aimed to make Transnistria part of Ukraine)

Casualties and losses
279–324 killed; 1,180 wounded	364–913 killed; 624 wounded
- 316–637 civilians killed in total

The Transnistrian War (Romanian: Războiul din Transnistria; Russian: Война в Приднестровье, romanized: Voyna v Pridnestrovye) was an armed conflict that broke out on 2 November 1990 in Dubăsari between pro-separatist (Pridnestrovian Moldavian Republic, PMR; Transnistria) forces, including the Transnistrian Republican Guard, militia and neo-Cossack units, which were supported by elements of the Russian 14th Army, and pro-government forces, including Moldovan troops and police.

Fighting intensified on 1 March 1992 and, alternating with ad hoc ceasefires, lasted throughout the spring and early summer of 1992 until a ceasefire was declared on 21 July 1992, which has held. The conflict is sometimes known as the Dniester War (Romanian: Războiul de la Nistru) or the Moldovan–Russian war (Romanian: Războiul moldo-rus) in Moldova and Romania. According to Moldovan historian Gheorghe E. Cojocaru, the Moldovan defeat in this war directly led to the implementation of Moldovan neutrality.

== Background ==
=== Historical background ===
Before the Soviet occupation of Bessarabia and Northern Bukovina and the creation of the Moldavian SSR in 1940, the Bessarabian part of Moldova, i.e. the part situated to the west of the river Dniester (Nistru), was part of Romania (1918–1940). The Molotov–Ribbentrop Pact between the Soviet Union and Nazi Germany, which led to the events of 1940, was later denounced by present-day Moldova, which declared it "null and void" in its Declaration of Independence in 1991. However, after the breakup of the Soviet Union, the territorial changes resulting from it have remained in place.

Before the creation of the Moldavian SSR, today's Transnistria was part of the Ukrainian SSR as an autonomous republic called the Moldavian Autonomous Soviet Socialist Republic, with Tiraspol as its capital (1924–1940). It represents slightly more than one tenth of Moldova's territory.

=== Political background ===
Under Soviet rule, the Moldavian SSR became subject to a Russification policy, including isolation from the Romanian cultural sphere and the imposition of the Cyrillic alphabet for the Romanian language. During the last years of the 1980s, the political landscape of the Soviet Union was changing due to Mikhail Gorbachev's policies of perestroika and glasnost, which allowed political pluralism at the regional (republican) level. In the Moldavian SSR, as in many other parts of the Soviet Union, national movements became the leading political force. As these movements exhibited increasingly nationalist sentiments and expressed intent to leave the USSR in favor of uniting with Romania, they encountered growing opposition from among the primarily Russian-speaking ethnic minorities living in the republic. This opposition to the new trends and potential future policies was manifested in a more visible way in Transnistria, where, unlike the rest of the MSSR, ethnic Moldovans (39.9%) were outnumbered by the combined figure of Russians and Ukrainians (53.8%) as per the 1989 census in Transnistria, largely due to higher immigration during the Soviet era.

While some believe that the combination of a distinct history (especially 1918–1940) and a fear of discrimination by Moldovans, gave rise to separatist sentiments, others believe that ethnic tensions alone fail to account for the dynamics of the conflict. According to John Mackinlay and Peter Cross, who conducted a study based on casualty reports, significant numbers of both Transnistrians and Moldovans fought together on both sides of the conflict. They suggest that the conflict is more political in nature.

On 31 August 1989, the Supreme Soviet of the Moldavian SSR enacted two laws. One of them made Moldovan the official language, in lieu of Russian, the de facto official language of the Soviet Union. It also mentioned a linguistic Moldo–Romanian identity. The second law stipulated the return to the Latin Romanian alphabet. Moldovan language is the term used in the former Soviet Union for a virtually identical dialect of the Romanian language during 1940–1989. On 27 April 1990, the Supreme Soviet of the Moldavian SSR adopted the traditional tricolour (blue, yellow and red) flag with the Moldavian coat of arms. Later that year, the words Soviet and Socialist were dropped and the name of the country was changed to "Republic of Moldova". In 1991, the national anthem was changed to Deșteaptă-te, române!, the national anthem of Romania since 1990.

These events, including the end of the Ceaușescu regime in neighboring Romania in December 1989 and the partial opening of the border between Romania and Moldova on 6 May 1990, led many in Transnistria and Moldova to believe that a union between Moldova and Romania was inevitable. This possibility caused fears among the Russian-speaking population that they would be excluded from most aspects of public life. From September 1989, there were strong scenes of protests in the region against the central government's ethnic policies. The protests developed into the formation of secessionist movements in Gagauzia and Transnistria, which initially sought autonomy within the Moldavian SSR, in order to retain Russian and Gagauz as official languages. As the nationalist-dominated Moldavian Supreme Soviet outlawed these initiatives, the Gagauz Republic and Transnistria declared themselves as separate from Moldova and announced their application to be reattached to the Soviet Union as independent federal republics.

=== Political conflict ===
The language laws presented a particularly volatile issue as a great proportion of the non-Moldovan population of the Moldavian SSR did not speak Moldovan (Romanian). The problem of the official language in the MSSR had become a Gordian knot, being exaggerated and, perhaps, intentionally politicized. Some described the language laws as "discriminatory" and criticized their rapid implementation. Others, on the contrary, complained the laws were not followed.

On 2 September 1990, the Pridnestrovian Moldavian Soviet Socialist Republic was proclaimed, "Pridnestrovie" being the name for Transnistria in Russian. On 22 December 1990 president Gorbachev signed a decree that declared void the decisions of the Second Congress of People Deputies of Transnistria from 2 September. For two months, Moldovan authorities refrained from taking action against this proclamation. Transnistria became one of the "unrecognized republics" that appeared throughout the USSR, alongside Abkhazia, South Ossetia and Nagorno-Karabakh. These self-proclaimed states maintained close ties with each other.

One of the first clashes between the Moldovan government and separatists occurred on 2 November 1990 in Dubăsari. Local women stormed the Court and Prosecutor's Office and stayed there for several hours. A police detachment was then dispatched to clear a roadblock placed by the city residents on the bridge over the river Dniester that effectively cut the city off from the central government. After being prevented from clearing the roadblock, policemen opened fire, with three residents of Dubăsari being killed and 13 wounded, resulting in the first casualties of the conflict.

In the aftermath of the failure of the Soviet coup attempt of 1991, on 27 August 1991, the Moldovan parliament adopted the Declaration of Independence of the Republic of Moldova. The declaration referred to the Molotov–Ribbentrop Pact as "null and void" and viewed Moldova's Independence as an act of elimination of "the political and legal consequences of the above", declaring that the establishment of the Moldavian SSR on the territories of Bessarabia, Northern Bukovina, Hertsa region and the Moldavian ASSR was made in absence of "any real legal basis". The PMR interpreted this as meaning that the 1940-merger of the two sides of the Dniester river was dissolved. Moldova, however, did not agree, as large portions of the territory occupied in 1940 by the USSR remain in Ukraine, and almost immediately took steps to assert its sovereignty over the full territory of the former MSSR.

At that time, the Republic of Moldova did not have its own army, and the first attempts to create one took place in early 1992 in response to the escalating conflict. On 27 August 1991, the newly independent Moldovan parliament had declared independence and asked the government of the USSR "to begin negotiations with the Moldovan government in order to put an end to the illegal occupation of the Republic of Moldova and withdraw Soviet troops from Moldovan territory".

When, on 29 August 1991, Transnistria's independence leader Igor Smirnov and three other deputies arrived in Kyiv, the capital of Ukraine, to meet Ukrainian leader Leonid Kravchuk, Smirnov and Andrei Cheban were arrested by Moldova's police and immediately transported to a prison in Moldova. In protest, the women's strike committee headed by Galina Andreeva blocked the Moscow–Chișinău railway line at a waypoint between Bender (Tighina) and Tiraspol, until the men were freed.

In late 1991, policemen in Tiraspol and Rîbnița swore allegiance to the PMR.

== Military strength ==
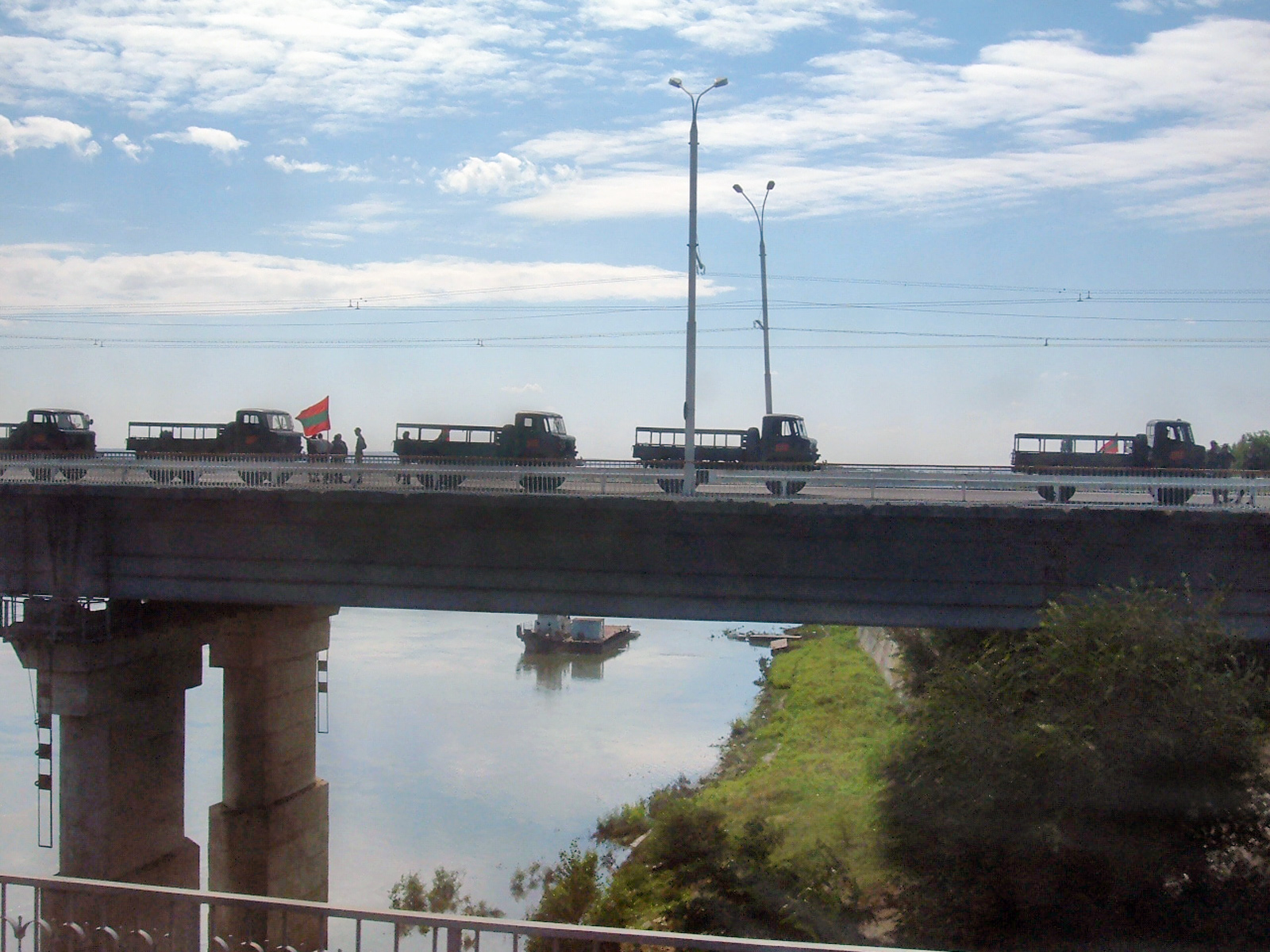
PMR trucks on the bridge between Tiraspol and Bender (Tighina)

By 1992, Moldova had troops under the Ministry of the Interior. On 17 March 1992, they started recruiting troops for the newly created Ministry of Defence. By July 1992, total Moldovan troop strength has been estimated at 25,000–35,000, including called-up police officers, conscripts, reservists and volunteers, especially from the Moldavian localities near the conflict zone.

In addition to Soviet weaponry inherited upon independence, Moldova also obtained arms from Romania. Romania also sent military advisors and volunteers to aid Moldova during the conflict.

At the same time, the Russian 14th Guards Army in Moldovan territory numbered about 14,000 professional soldiers. The PMR authorities had 9,000 militiamen trained and armed by officers of the 14th Army. The volunteers came from the Russian Federation: a number of Don, Kuban, Orenburg, Sibir and local Transnistrian Black Sea Cossacks joined in to fight alongside the separatists. Due to the irregular makeup of the forces, troop strength of the PMR is in dispute, but it is believed that during March it numbered around 12,000.

Forces of the 14th Army (which had owed allegiance to the USSR, CIS and the Russian Federation in turn) stationed in Transnistria, had fought with and on behalf of the PMR forces. A significant portion of the personnel of the Russian 14th Army were local conscripts and officers that had been given local residence. PMR units were able to arm themselves with weapons taken from the stores of the former 14th Army. The Russian troops chose not to oppose the PMR units who had come to help themselves from the Army's stores; on the contrary, in many cases they helped the PMR troops equip themselves by handing over weapons and by opening up the ammunition stores to them.

In December 1991, the Moldovan authorities arrested Lieutenant-General Yakovlev in Ukrainian territory, accusing him of helping the PMR forces to arm themselves by using the weapons stocks of the 14th Army. At that time, General Yakovlev had been both Commander of the 14th Army and "Head of the National Defence and Security Department" of the PMR. The government of the Russian Federation interceded with the Moldovan government to obtain the release of General Yakovlev in exchange for 26 policemen detained by PMR forces at the start of the fighting in Dubăsari.

On 5 April 1992, Vice President Rutskoy of Russia, in a speech delivered to 5,000 people in Tiraspol, encouraged the Transnistrian people to obtain their independence.

== Military conflict ==
The first fatalities in the emerging conflict took place on 2 November 1990, two months after the PMR's 2 September 1990 declaration of independence. Moldovan forces entered Dubăsari in order to separate Transnistria into two halves, but were stopped by the city's inhabitants, who had blocked the bridge over the Dniester, at Lunga. In an attempt to break through the roadblock, Moldovan forces then opened fire. In the course of the confrontation, three Dubăsari locals, Oleg Geletiuk, Vladimir Gotkas and Valerie Mitsuls, were killed by the Moldovan forces and sixteen people wounded.

A second Moldovan attempt to cross the Lunga bridge took place on 13 December 1991. As a result of the fighting, 27 PMR troops were taken prisoner and four Moldovan troops (Ghenadie Iablocikin, Gheorghe Cașu, Valentin Mereniuk and Mihai Arnăut) were killed, without Moldova being able to cross the bridge. After this second failed attempt, there was a lull in military activity until 2 March 1992, the day Moldova was admitted as a member of the United Nations, i.e. received full international recognition of its 27 August 1991 declaration of independence. After Transnistrian paramilitary advances Moldova declared the state of emergency on 29 March, the armed conflict culminated in May and June in three areas along the Dniester river, and died down on 19–21 June after the Battle of Bender (also Tighina) where the 14th former Soviet Army intervened and drove the Moldovan army putting an end to the conflict.

=== Cocieri-Dubăsari area ===
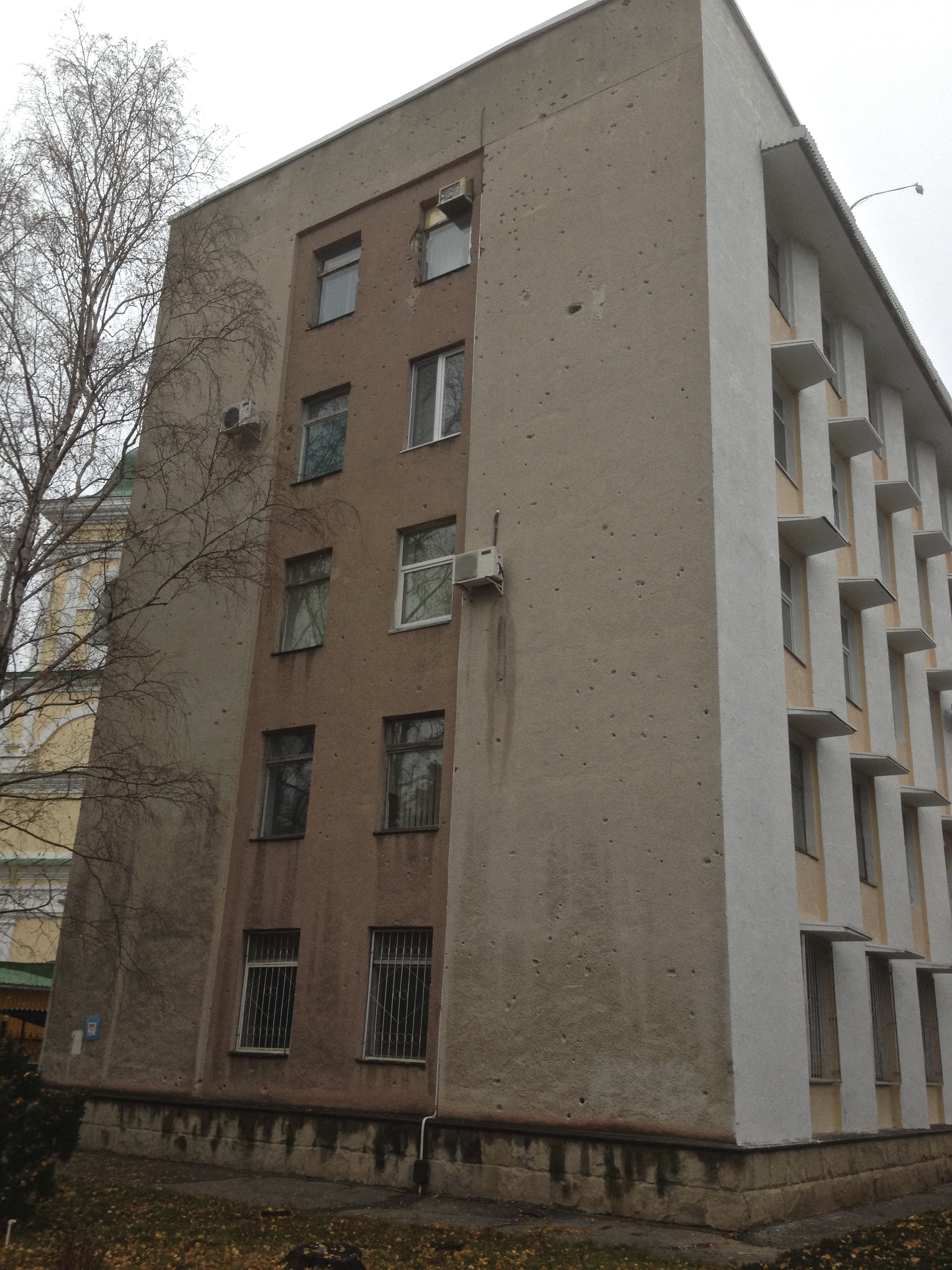
Building still showing damage from the brief fighting in Bender during Transnistria's war for independence from Moldova

The first area of military action was on the eastern shore of the Dniester river, from north to south, the villages of Molovata Nouă, Cocieri (approx 6,000 inhabitants), Corjova and the city of Dubăsari (approx 30,000 inhabitants), together forming a contiguous mainly inhabited area 10–12 km (about 7 miles) along the shore. The only connection to the western bank from the three villages is either a ferry, or two bridges in Dubăsari.

On 1 March 1992 Igor Shipcenko, the PMR militia chief of Dubăsari, was killed by a teenager and Moldovan police were accused of the killing. Although minor, this incident was a sufficient spark for the already very tense situation to blow up and cause the conflict to escalate.

In response, the Cossacks who came from Rostov-on-Don to support the PMR side stormed the police precinct in Dubăsari during the night. Moldovan president Mircea Snegur, afraid of starting an armed conflict, ordered the 26 policemen to surrender to the attacking Cossacks and PMR forces. They were later exchanged for Lieutenant-General Yakovlev. Moldovan policemen loyal to Chișinău from the Dubăsari raion (district), instead of returning to work in the occupied precinct in Dubăsari, now a milice precinct, gathered in Cocieri.

On 2 March 1992, locals from Cocieri, after hearing about the situation in Dubăsari, broke into the small local arms depot to arm themselves against the PMR side. Three locals (Alexandru Luchianov from Cocieri, Alexandru Gazea from Molovata and Mihai Nour from Roghi) were killed, but the military unit from Cocieri was defeated by the Moldovans. The officers and their families were forced to leave the village. More policemen were ferried the following days from the western bank of the Dniester. They organized a defense line around the three villages, while PMR forces retained control of Dubăsari. In the following weeks both PMR and Moldovan forces amassed large numbers in the area and fought a trench war, with intermittent ceasefires.

=== Coșnița area ===
A similar development occurred on 13 March in the villages of Coșnița, Pîrîta, Pohrebea and Doroțcaia. A second "bridge-head" was formed on the eastern bank, now south of Dubăsari.

In April, Russian Vice President Alexander Rutskoy visited Transnistria and expressed the full support of Transnistrian separatists by Soviet Russia.

=== Bender/Tighina area ===
A ceasefire was in negotiation during June 1992 in the Bender (Tighina) area. However, a full-scale battle erupted after regular Moldovan forces entered the city of Bender in an attempt to reestablish the authority of Moldova there. It has been reported that this action was a response to the stand-off at the police station in Bender on 19 June 1992. On the afternoon of that day, the Moldovan police in Bender arrested the 14th Army's Major Yermakov on suspicion of planned subversion. After his arrest, PMR guards opened fire on the police station. The Moldovan government ordered its troops to enter the city the following morning. Urban warfare ensued between the two sides in the densely populated city, causing civilian casualties. Moldovan radio report that three Soviet Russian T-64 tanks from the 14th Army, some bearing Russian flags, were destroyed when closing in on central Bender, two by MT-12 antitank guns, and the third one was hit by a rocket propelled grenade into the engine. A fourth tank was disabled when its tracks were struck by another rocket propelled grenade. Russian Army spokesmen said the tanks had been seized from depots by separatists. Russian sources reported "dozens of dead" in the streets.

The news of the havoc in Bender reached Tiraspol, only 11 km (7 miles) away, as Moldovan troops were approaching the crucial bridge over the Dniester. At this point, with the support of ROG's tanks, the Transnistrian Republican Guard and Cossack volunteers rushed to confront the Moldovan forces. Russian Vice-president Rutskoy, in a speech delivered on the main channel of the Russian television, called for all Russian forces in Tiraspol to storm Bender. In the course of the following days, parts of the city of Bender, including the center, were retaken by PMR forces.

On 22 June 1992, acting on news that troops from the 14th Army were ready to cross the Dniestr and move deep into Moldova, the Moldovan military ordered an airstrike to destroy the bridge between Bender and Tiraspol. Three MiG-29s took off from Chisinau, two armed with six OFAB-250 bombs apiece. The other aircraft was a MiG-29UB providing cover. No direct hits were achieved on the intended target, but the bridge received some blast and splinter damage from near misses. One of the bombs went astray and fell on a civilian residence, killing a number of people inside. Sources from the 14th Army claimed a second MiG-29 attack on an oil refinery at Tiraspol the following day, in which one aircraft was allegedly shot down by a S-125 Neva/Pechora missile, but this sortie was denied by Moldovan authorities.

== Ceasefire and Joint Control Commission ==
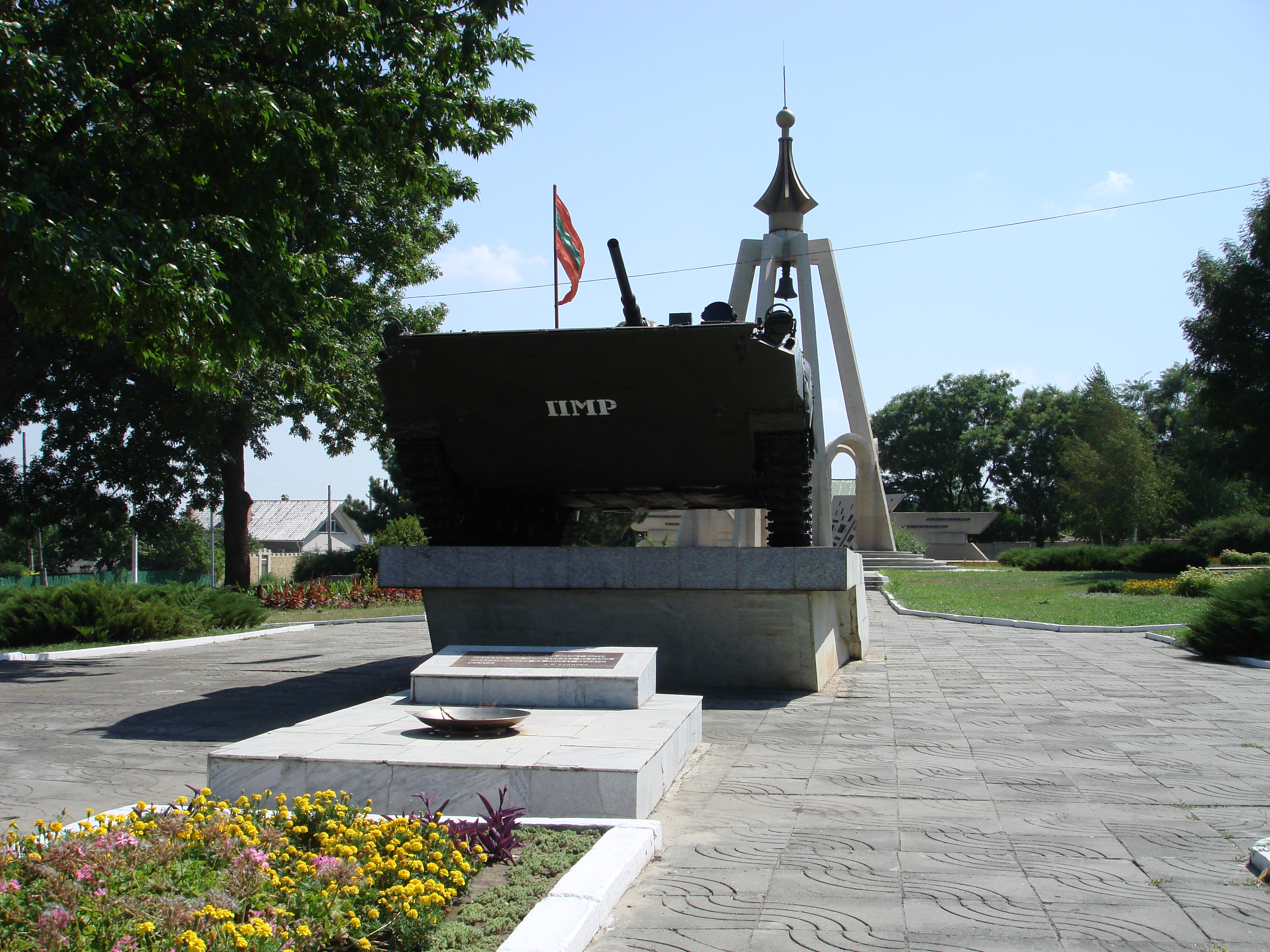
Bender's war memorial

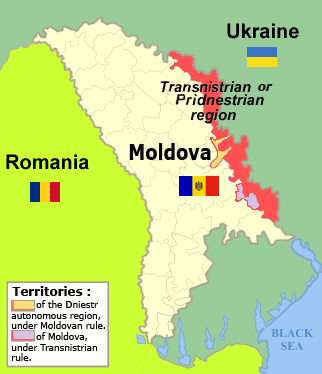
Territorial control after the end of the Transnistrian War

A ceasefire agreement was signed on 21 July. This official document whose broad lines was established by the Russian side, was signed by the presidents of Russia (Boris Yeltsin) and Moldova (Mircea Snegur). The agreement provided for peacekeeping forces charged with ensuring observance of the ceasefire and security arrangements, composed of five Russian battalions, three Moldovan battalions and two PMR battalions under the orders of a joint military command structure, the Joint Control Commission (JCC).

It is estimated that in total nearly one thousand people were killed in the conflict, with the number of wounded approaching 3,000. Unlike many other post-Soviet conflicts, IDPs (internally displaced persons) did not reach large numbers in the war of Transnistria.

Days after the truce had been agreed upon, a military confrontation between a local self-defence unit and the Moldovan army, took place in Gîsca (Gyska), a village with an ethnic Russian majority near Bender. At least three villagers were killed. During the combat, civil buildings were damaged or destroyed by artillery fire. Later reports of ceasefire violations have been brought under control with no known loss of human lives.

The Russian 14th Army's role in the area was crucial to the outcome of the war. The Moldovan army's position of inferiority prevented it from gaining control of Transnistria. Russia has since disbanded the 14th army and reduced troop strength in Transnistria to a corps of around 1,300 men who form part of the JCC.

With the PMR's overwhelming military superiority, Moldova had little chance of achieving victory and the fighting was unpopular with the skeptical Moldovan population.

== Human rights abuses ==
According to a Human Rights Center "Memorial" report, local Bender eyewitnesses on 19 June 1992 saw Moldovan troops in armored vehicles deliberately firing at houses, courtyards and cars with heavy machine guns. The next day, Moldovan troops allegedly shot at civilians that were hiding in houses, trying to escape the city, or helping wounded PMR guardsmen. Other local eyewitnesses testified that in the same day, unarmed men who gathered in the Bender downtown square in request of the PMR Executive Committee were fired at from machine guns. HRC observers were told by doctors in Bender that as a result of heavy fire from Moldovan positions between 19 and 20 June, they were unable to attend the wounded.

From 21 to 22 June, both sides engaged in intense urban street fighting, which employed the use of tanks, artillery and grenade launchers. Officers from both sides admitted that these actions led to an increase in civilian casualties. During this time period, ambulance cars were fired upon, with both sides accusing each other of the attacks. PMR sources stated that in Bender, one doctor was killed and several wounded, while six ambulance personnel were wounded in Căușeni.

In the Moldovan city of Chișinău, HRC Memorial observers interviewed 12 Transnistrian prisoners of war. The prisoners stated that while being initially detained and interrogated in Căușeni, they were severely beaten with clubs and gun buttstocks by Moldovan police, as well as being threatened with firing squads.

There were some reports of captured Moldovan policemen, soldiers and volunteers being beaten and tortured by PMR forces.

== Foreign involvement ==
=== Involvement of the Russian Army ===
Although the Russian Army officially took the position of neutrality and non-involvement, many of its officers were sympathetic towards the fledgling Pridnestrovian Moldavian Republic (PMR) and some even defected in order to help the PMR side openly. ROG Parcani sapper battalion, under the orders of General Butkevich, went over to the PMR side. This battalion later destroyed the bridges at Dubăsari, Gura Bâcului–Bâcioc and Coșnița. Moldovan forces used aircraft in the village of Parcani (Parkany) and shelled the ROG station there which meant engaging not just PMR but also Russian forces.

In 1991, PMR paramilitary forces conducted forays into supply depots of the 14th Guards Army, appropriating an unknown but large amount of equipment. With the commanding officer of the 14th Guards Army, General G. I. Yakovlev, openly supporting the newly created PMR, these forays usually met no resistance from army guards, who never faced punishment. Yakovlev eventually participated in the founding of the PMR, served in the PMR Supreme Soviet and accepted the position as the first chairman of the PMR Department of Defense on 3 December 1991, causing the Commander-in-Chief of the CIS armed forces, Yevgeny Shaposhnikov, to promptly relieve him of his rank and service in the Russian military. Yakovlev's successor, General Yuriy Netkachev, assumed a more neutral stance in the conflict. However, his attempts at mediation between Chișinău and Tiraspol were largely unsuccessful and the situation escalated to an open military engagement by June 1992. On 23 June, in the wake of a coordinated offensive by Moldovan forces, Major General Alexander Lebed arrived at the 14th Army headquarters with standing orders to inspect the army, prevent the theft of armaments from its depots, stop the ongoing conflict with any means available and ensure the unimpeded evacuation of armaments and Army personnel from Moldovan and through Ukrainian territory. After briefly assessing the situation, he assumed command of the army, relieving Netkachev, and ordered his troops to enter the conflict directly. On 3 July at 03:00, a massive artillery strike from 14th Army formations stationed on left bank of the Dniester obliterated the Moldovan force concentrated in Gerbovetskii forest, near Bender, effectively ending the military phase of the conflict. Romanian authors Anatolie Muntean and Nicolae Ciubotaru attribute to Lebed a quote demonstrating his support of the Transnistrian cause: "I am proud that we helped and armed Transnistrian guards against Moldovan fascists". He also called himself as "guarantor" of the "Dniester Republic". However, he bore no goodwill towards the Transnistrian leadership and frequently denounced them as "criminals" and "bandits". Another quote attributed to him describes his stance as follows: "I told the hooligans [separatists] in Tiraspol and the fascists in Chișinău – either you stop killing each other, or else I'll shoot the whole lot of you with my tanks".

=== Involvement of Russian and Ukrainian volunteers ===
Volunteers from Russia and Ukraine, including Don and Kuban Cossacks, fought on Transnistria's side. There is no general consensus on the number of volunteers or the military role they played in the conflict. Estimates range from as low as 200 to as high as 3,000. Russian volunteers included: Dmitry Rogozin, Eduard Limonov and Igor Girkin.

During the Transnistrian War, UNA-UNSO members fought alongside Transnistrian separatists against Moldovan government forces in defense of a large ethnic-Ukrainian minority in Transnistria. The incongruous motive of assisting a mostly pro-Russian region was for the "struggle of Slavs over Moldovan-Romanian aggression." Following the war, 50 UNSO members were awarded the PMR "Defender of Transnistria" medal. The organization's participation in the conflict was condemned by Ukrainian politicians, including People's Movement of Ukraine leader Viacheslav Chornovil, who visited Moldova in summer 1992 and expressed his people's support for Moldovans' struggle against separatism.

According to Romanian sources, at least one inmate was released from Bender prison to be enrolled in the Transnistrian Guard.

=== Involvement of Romania ===
Shortly before the escalation of the conflict in late June 1992, Romania provided military support to Moldova by supplying weaponry, ammunition and armed vehicles, and also by sending military advisers and training Moldovan military and police forces. Volunteers from Romania fought on Moldova's side. However, the Romanian support for Moldova was not sufficient to win the war, which disappointed the pro-Romanian segments of the Moldovan population.

== See also ==
- History of Transnistria
- Kozak memorandum
- Military history of the Russian Federation
- Moldova–Transnistria relations
- Moldovan neutrality
- Odesa Military District
- Russian military presence in Transnistria
- Transnistria conflict
- Uppsala Conflict Data Program
