= Orders, decorations, and medals of Moldova =

The system of orders, decorations, and medals of the Republic of Moldova was established by Law no. 1123 of 30.07.1992, "On the state awards of the Republic of Moldova". This law establishes a system of orders, medals, and honorary titles along with their criteria for award and their order of precedence.

== Orders ==
| # | Name | Image | Ribbon |
|---|---|---|---|
| 1 | Order of the Republic (Ordinul Republicii) | | |
| 2 | Order of Stephen the Great (Ordinul „Ștefan cel Mare”) | | |
| 3 | Order of Bogdan the Founder (Ordinul „Bogdan Întemeietorul”) | | |
| 4 | Order of Honour (Ordinul Onoarei) | | |
| 5 | Order of Freedom (Ordinul Libertății) | | |
| 6 | Order of Allegiance to the Motherland (Ordinul „Credință Patriei”) | | |
| 7 | Order of Labour (Ordinul Muncii) | | |

== Crosses ==
| # | Name | Image | Ribbon |
|---|---|---|---|
| 1 | Military Merit Cross (Crucea „Meritul Militar”) | | |
| 2 | International Missions Cross (Crucea Misiunilor Internaționale ) | | |

== Medals ==
| # | Name | Image | Ribbon |
|---|---|---|---|
| 1 | Medal for Bravery (Medalia „Pentru Vitejie”) | | |
| 2 | Civil Merit Medal (Medalia „Meritul Civic”) | | |
| 3 | Academic Merit Medal (Medalia „Meritul Academic”) | | |
| 4 | Mihai Eminescu Medal (Medalia „MIhai Eminescu”) | | |
| 5 | Nicolae Testemițanu Medal (Medalia „Nicolae Testemițanu”) | | |

== Honorary titles ==
| Name | Image |
|---|---|
| People's Artist (Artist al Poporului) | |
| Master of Art (Maestru în Artă) | |
| Master of Literature (Maestru al Literaturii) | |
| Merited Citizen (Om Emerit) | |
| Merited Artist (Artist Emerit) | |
| Meșter-Faur | |
