= Order of Honour (Moldova) =

Moldovan order

Order of Honour Ordinul Onoarei
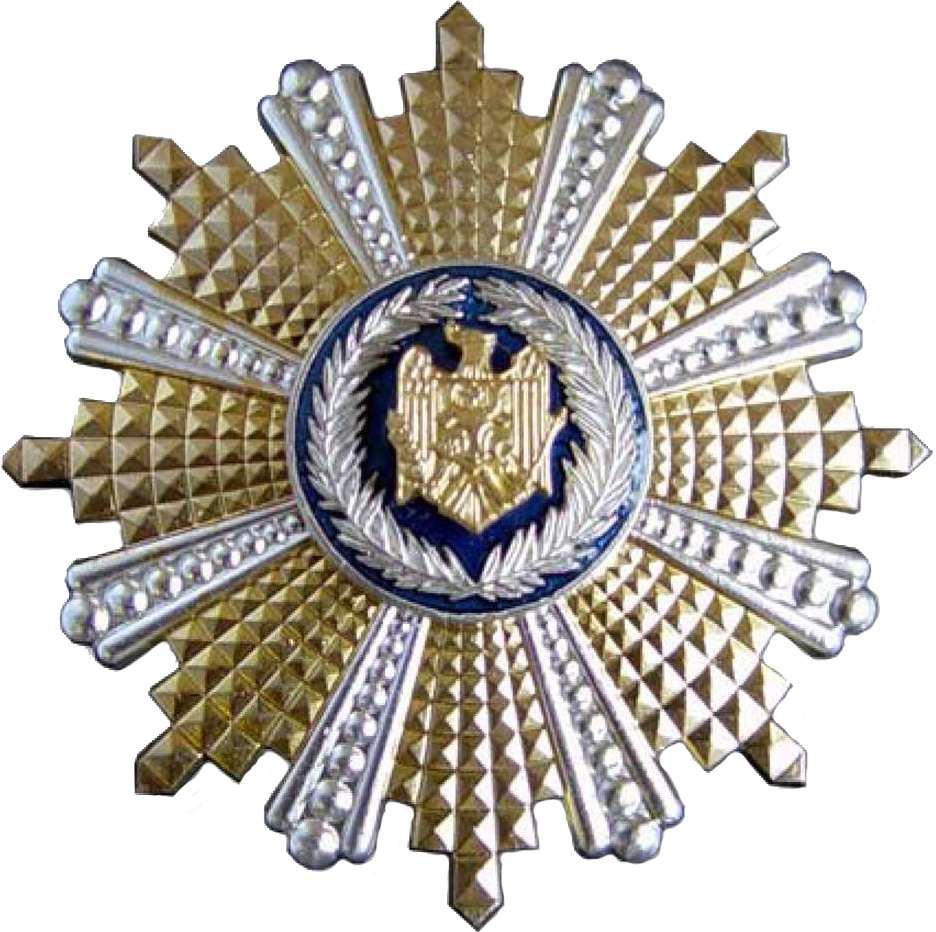

Awarded by the President of Moldova
- Type: Single-grade order
- Established: 27 September 2002; 23 years ago
- Country: Moldova
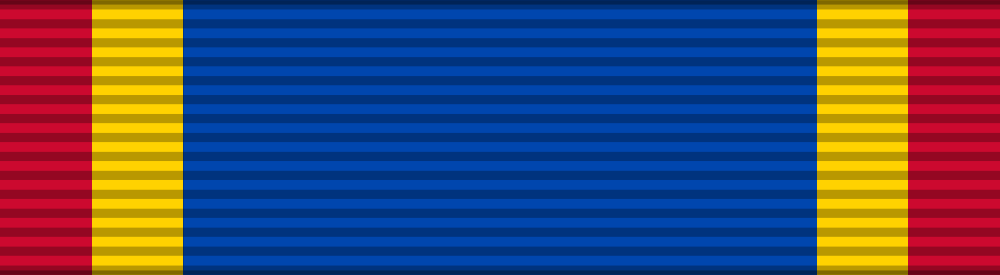
- Ribbon
- Eligibility: Moldovan and foreign individuals and organizations
- Status: Active

Statistics
- First induction: 2003

Precedence
- Next (higher): Order of Bogdan the Founder
- Next (lower): Order of Freedom

The Order of Honour (Romanian: Ordinul Onoarei) is a state order of the Republic of Moldova established by Parliament of Moldova in 2002, which is awarded by presidential decree. It is the fourth highest distinction of Moldova, after the Order of the Republic, Order of Stephen the Great, Order of Bogdan the Founder and just before the Order of Freedom. The Order of Honour can be awarded also to organizations, institutions, etc.

== Notable individual recipients (partial list) ==
- Sepp Blatter
- Michel Platini
- Borys Paton
- Radosław Sikorski
- Serafim Urechean
- Pavel Cebanu
- Titus Corlățean
- Raed Arafat
- Mitrofan Cioban
- Zinaida Greceanîi
- Vasile Sturza
- Ion Negrei
- Alexandru Tănase
- Vladimir Hotineanu
- Valeriu Cosarciuc
- Leonid Bujor
- Alexandru Oleinic
- Valentina Buliga
- Marcel Răducan
- Veaceslav Iordan
- Dumitru Diacov
- Vasile Ursu
- Vadim Cojocaru
- Oleg Bodrug
- Veaceslav Untilă
- Ion Pleșca
- Iurie Colesnic
- Anatolie Ghilaș
- Nicolae Dabija (politician)
- Vasile Șoimaru
- Tudor Gheorghe Țopa
- Mihai Poiată
- Vasile Vatamanu
- Alecu Reniță
- Ion Ungureanu
- Victor Stepaniuc
- Nicolae Țâu
- Gheorghe Amihalachioaie
- Peter (Păduraru)
- Victor Pușcaș
- Marius Lazurca
- Dan Dungaciu
- Ion Țurcanu
- Mihail Dolgan
- Dirk Schuebel
- Cesare de Montis
- Mihai Balan
- Vitalie Ciobanu
- Academy of Economic Studies of Moldova
- Nichita Smochină
- Grigore Belostecinic
- Emilian Galaicu-Păun
- Vasile Bumacov
- Andrei Usatîi
- Tatiana Anodina
- Nicolae Andronic
- Gheorghe Buzatu
- Marchel (Mihăescu)
- Peter (Musteață)
- Andrian Candu
- Ion Anton
- Valeriu Rudic
- Ionel Haiduc
- Irina Loghin
- Péter Szijjártó
- SunStroke Project

== Collective awardees ==
- George Asaki High School (Chișinău) (2010)
- Mikhail Berezovsky High School (Chișinău) (2010)
- Ion Creangă High School (Chișinău) (2010)
- Mihai Eminescu High School (Chișinău) (2010)
- Spiru Haret High School (Chișinău) (2010)
- Mihai the Brave High School (Chișinău) (2010)
- Academy of Economic Education of Moldova (2011)
- Saints Cyril and Methodius High School (Chișinău) (2011)
- State Enterprise "Security Service" of the Ministry of Internal Affairs of the Republic of Moldova (2012)
- Mihai Eminescu High School (Bălți) (2013)
- Ion Creangă Republican High School (Bălți) (2016)
- Department of Carabinieri Troops of the Ministry of Internal Affairs of the Republic of Moldova (2017)
- Academy of Public Administration (2018)
- Gymnasium named after N.V. Gogol of the city of Basarabeasca (2019)
- National Museum of Ethnography and Natural History (2019)
- National Children's Library. Ion Creangă (2019)
- City Clinical Hospital "St. Michael the Archangel" (Chișinău, 2019)
- Peace Corps
