= Anton Gămurari =

Moldovan general (1950–2021)

Anton Gămurari OR
- Born: 15 August 1950; Chișinău, Moldavian SSR, Soviet Union
- Died: 17 March 2021 (aged 70); Chișinău, Moldova
- Military career
- Allegiance: Moldova
- Branch: General Police Inspectorate
- Service years: 1991-1999
- Commands: Special Forces Brigade "Fulger"
- Conflicts: Transnistria War

Anton Gămurari (15 August 1950 – 17 March 2021) was a Moldovan general.

== Biography ==
Anton Gămurari was born in Chișinău, into a large family with nine children. His parents were workers at the Institute of Pomiculture in Chișinău. After graduating from high school in Chișinău, he decided to work as a driver at a factory to help support his large family. During this time, his father died. Shortly after his father's death, Anton Gămurari decided to enlist in the Soviet Army. He has said that his time in the Army was a true "school of maturity." After returning from the Army, he decided to pursue higher education. Thus, from 1977 to 1981, he studied at the Higher Military School in Leningrad.

== Career ==
During the Transnistria War, Lieutenant-Colonel Anton Gămurari commanded the Dubăsari Police Special Purpose Brigade, which fought with Transnistrian forces. On December 13, 1991, a Transnistrian attack on the Dubăsari Police Station took place. The Dubăsari Police Special Purpose Brigade spent the night at the hydroelectric plant and a fight ensued, resulting in the deaths of four Moldovan police officers. Negotiations followed, after which the Transnistrian forces withdrew. In March 1992, tensions rose again. The brigade crossed the Dniester River on the ice at Dubăsari and assisted the Dubăsari Police Station and the population of the villages of Cocieri and Corjova. In recognition of his actions, Anton Gămurari was promoted by President Mircea Snegur to the rank of major general of police.

In November 1997, General Gămurari was appointed Director-General of the Department of Civil Protection and Exceptional Situations. A report by the Court of Accounts found his performance unsatisfactory in terms of public financial management. The report revealed overspending of budgetary means in enormous proportions. He was relieved of his position as Director-General on July 29, 1999, and was succeeded by General Constantin Antoci.

Major General of Police Anton Gămurari participated in the training of all special troops of the Ministry of Interior, starting with the first company created within the Patrol and Sentinel Battalion, then the OMON special police detachment. On December 5, 1991, by a government decision, the "Fulger" (In English: "Lightning") Special Purpose Police Brigade was formed.

After joining the reserve, General Anton Gămurari served as vice president of the National Union of War Veterans for Independence (UNVRI).

Anton Gămurari died on 17 March 2021, at the age of 70, from COVID-19.
