= Rudic =

Rudic may refer to:

- Rudic (surname)
- Rudić (surname)
- Ruđić (brotherhood)
