= Republics of the Soviet Union =

Top-level political division of the Soviet Union

Republics of the Union of Soviet Socialist Republics
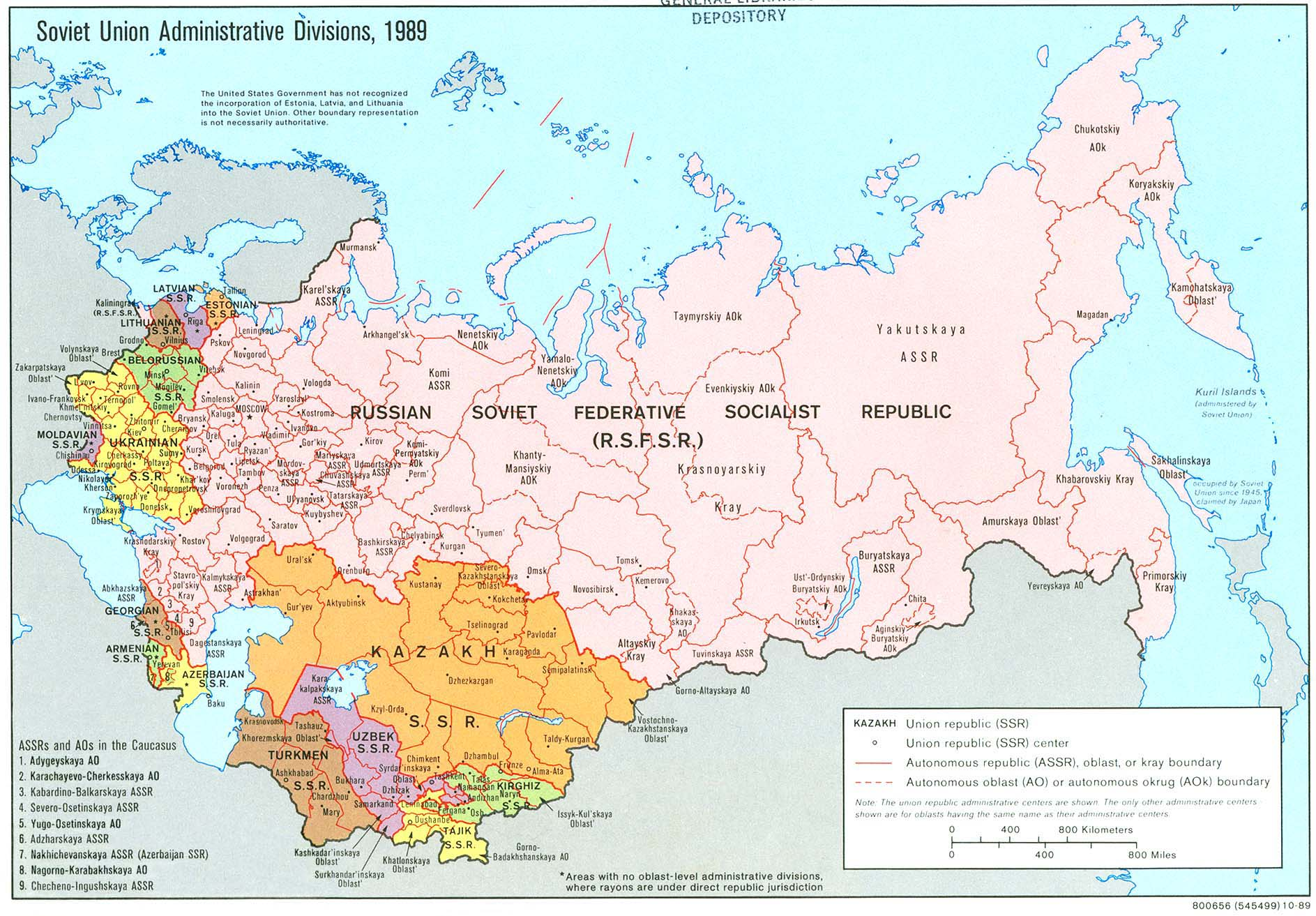
- Category: Federated state
- Created by: • Treaty on the Creation of the Union of Soviet Socialist Republics • Declaration of the Creation of the Union of Soviet Socialist Republics
- Created: 30 December 1922
- Abolished by: • Declaration № 142-N
- Abolished: 26 December 1991
- Number: 15 (as of 1956)
- Populations: Smallest: 1,565,662 (Estonian SSR); Largest: 147,386,000 (Russian SFSR)
- Areas: Smallest: 29,800 km^{2} (11,500 sq mi) (Armenian SSR); Largest: 17,075,400 km^{2} (6,592,800 sq mi) (Russian SFSR)
- Government: Communist Party of the Union of Soviet Socialist Republics
- Subdivisions: Autonomous SSRs; Oblasts

A Union Republic (Note: Russian: Сою́зная Респу́блика, romanized: Soyúznaya Respúblika) in the Union of Soviet Socialist Republics (USSR) was a constituent federated political entity with a system of government referred to as a soviet republic, which was officially defined in the 1977 constitution as "a sovereign Soviet socialist state which has united with the other Soviet republics to form the Union of Soviet Socialist Republics" and whose sovereignty is limited by membership in the USSR. As a result of its status as a sovereign state, a Union Republic de jure had the legal right to engage in direct bilateral relations with foreign states, such as by concluding treaties and agreements with them and exchanging diplomatic and consular representatives; and to gain individual membership in and participate in the activities of international organizations. Perceived as national-based administrative divisions, there were 15 Union Republics at peak—all of which seceded as fully independent sovereign states during the dissolution of the USSR between 1988 and 1991: Armenia, Azerbaijan, Belarus, Estonia, Georgia, Kazakhstan, Kyrgyzstan, Latvia, Lithuania, Moldova, Russia, Tajikistan, Turkmenistan, Ukraine, and Uzbekistan.

The USSR was formally created by a 1922 treaty signed by the first four such Union Republics: Belarus, Russia, the Transcaucasian Federation (i.e., Armenia–Azerbaijan–Georgia), and Ukraine. From its creation until 1990, it was a one-party state governed by the Communist Party of the USSR, which was founded by Vladimir Lenin in 1912. Despite its nominal structure as a federation of republics, the USSR's key functions of governance were highly centralized in Moscow, whereby power was considerably concentrated in the Russian Soviet Federative Socialist Republic (RSFSR) in comparison to the others. The gradual reversal of this status quo in the late 1980s under Soviet leader Mikhail Gorbachev, who moved the USSR towards decentralization by initiating the reformative "demokratizatsiya" era of perestroika and glasnost as part of the non-binding 1975 Helsinki Accords, is cited as one of the factors that led to the end of the Cold War and the formation of the Commonwealth of Independent States among most of the former Union Republics by 1991.

The only Union Republic to have been deprived of its top-level administrative status in the history of the USSR was the Karelo-Finnish Soviet Socialist Republic, which was, as a relic of the Winter War with Finland during World War II, absorbed into the RSFSR in 1956. The decision to strip it down to the Karelian Autonomous Soviet Socialist Republic within the RSFSR was made unilaterally from Moscow, which had already been de facto controlling the Union Republic directly. Among the official rationale for this reduction in administrative power was the demographic changes that had occurred in the region's population (about 80% of the inhabitants were Russians, Belarusians, and Ukrainians) as well as the need to reduce the cost of the state apparatus, which had amounted to 19.6 million Soviet rubles in 1955.

== Overview ==
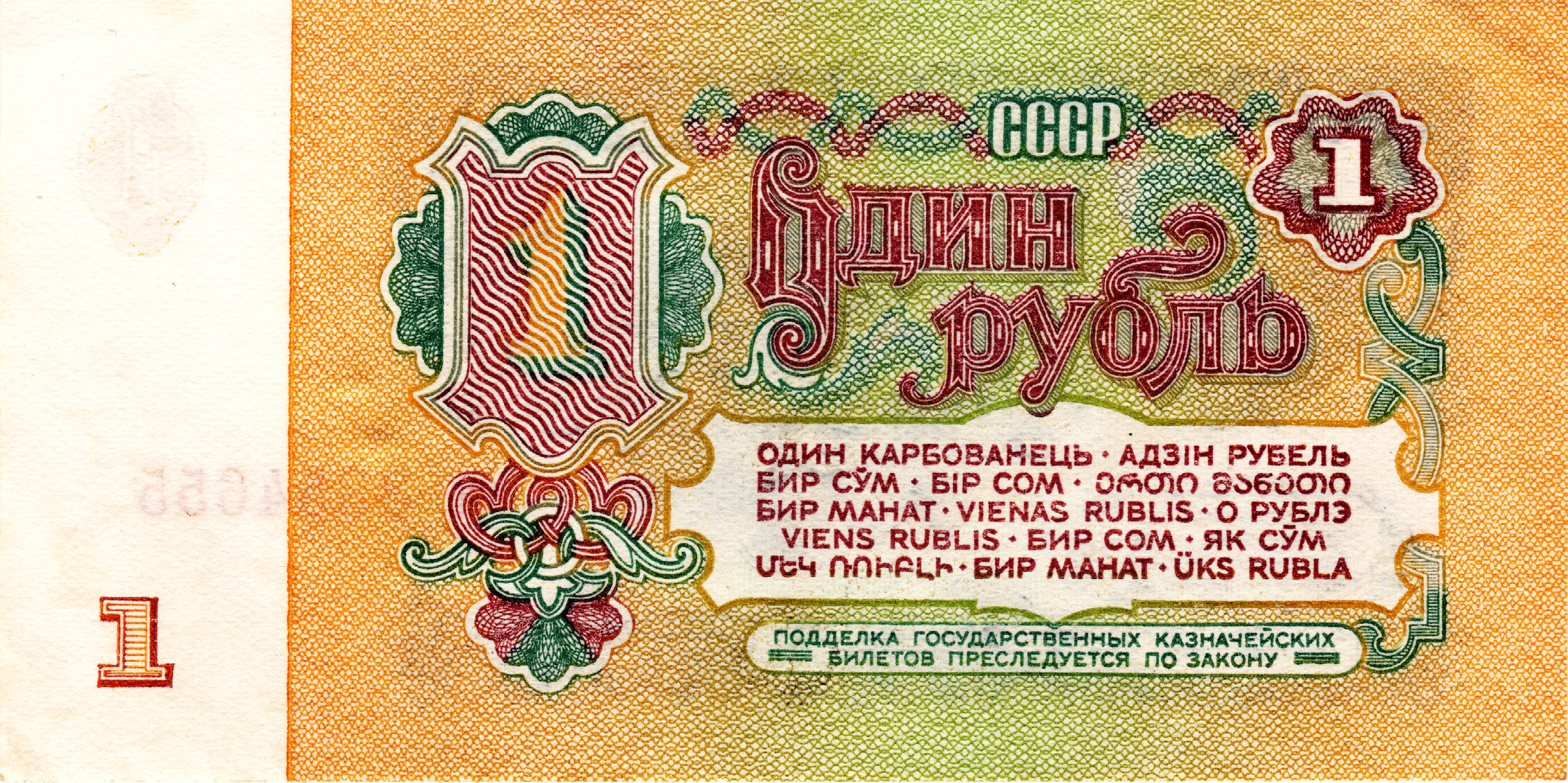
Reverse of the 1-ruble note of the 1961 series, with the value in all the official languages of the Union Republics

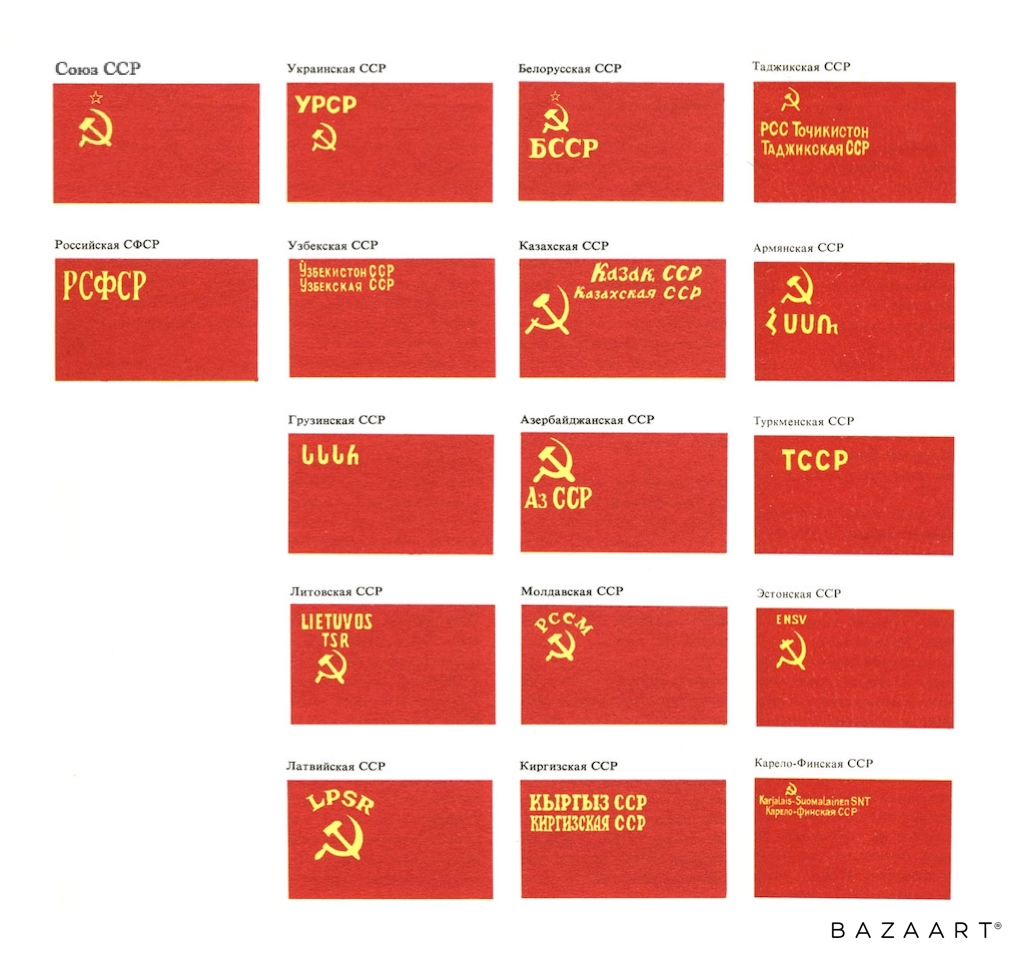
Flags of all 16 union republics along with the Soviet flag in the 1940s

Chapter 8 of the 1977 Soviet Constitution is titled as the "Soviet Union is a union state". Article 70 stated that the union was founded on the principles of "socialist federalism" as a result of the free self-determination of nations and the voluntary association of equal Soviet Socialist Republics. Article 71 listed all fifteen union republics that united into the Soviet Union.

According to Article 76 of the 1977 Soviet Constitution, a union republic was defined as a sovereign Soviet socialist state that had united with other Soviet Republics into the USSR. Article 78 of the Constitution stated that the territory of a union republic may not be altered without its consent. The boundaries between republics may be altered by mutual agreement of the republics concerned, if the rest of the union agreed. Article 81 of the Constitution stated that "the sovereign rights of Union Republics shall be safeguarded by the USSR".

In the final decades of its existence, the Soviet Union officially consisted of fifteen Soviet Socialist Republics (SSRs). All of them, with the exception of the Russian SFSR (until 1990), had their own local party chapters of the All-Union Communist Party.

In 1944, amendments to the All-Union Constitution allowed for separate branches of the Red Army for each Soviet Republic. They also allowed for Republic-level commissariats for foreign affairs and defense, allowing them to be recognized as de jure independent states in international law. This allowed for two Soviet Republics, Ukraine and Byelorussia, (as well as the USSR as a whole) to join the United Nations General Assembly as founding members in 1945.

The Soviet currency Soviet ruble banknotes all included writings in national languages of all the 15 union republics.

All of the former Republics of the Union are now independent countries, with ten of them (all except the Baltic states, Georgia and Ukraine) being very loosely organized under the heading of the Commonwealth of Independent States. The Baltic states assert that their incorporation into the Soviet Union in 1940 (as the Lithuanian, Latvian, and Estonian SSRs) under the provisions of the 1939 Molotov–Ribbentrop Pact was illegal, and that they therefore remained independent countries under Soviet occupation. Their position is supported by the European Union, the European Court of Human Rights, the United Nations Human Rights Council and the United States. In contrast, the Russian government and state officials maintain that the Soviet annexation of the Baltic states was legitimate.

Constitutionally, the Soviet Union was a federation. In accordance with provisions present in its Constitution (versions adopted in 1924, 1936 and 1977), each republic retained the right to secede from the USSR. Throughout the Cold War, this right was widely considered to be meaningless; however, the corresponding Article 72 of the 1977 Constitution was used in December 1991 to effectively dissolve the Soviet Union, when Russia, Ukraine, and Belarus seceded from the Union. Although the Union was created under an initial ideological appearance of forming a supranational union, it never de facto functioned as one; an example of the ambiguity is that the Ukrainian Soviet Socialist Republic in the 1930s officially had its own foreign minister, but that office did not exercise any true sovereignty apart from that of the union. The Constitution of the Soviet Union in its various iterations defined the union as a federation with the right of the republics to secede. This constitutional status led to the possibility of the parade of sovereignties once the republic with de facto (albeit not de jure) dominance over the other republics, the Russian one, developed a prevailing political notion asserting that it would be better off if it seceded. The de facto dominance of the Russian republic is the reason that various historians (for example, Dmitri Volkogonov and others) have asserted that the union was a unitary state in fact albeit not in law.

In practice, the USSR was a highly centralised entity from its creation in 1922 until the mid-1980s when political forces unleashed by reforms undertaken by Mikhail Gorbachev resulted in the loosening of central control and its ultimate dissolution. Under the constitution adopted in 1936 and modified along the way until October 1977, the political foundation of the Soviet Union was formed by the Soviets (Councils) of People's Deputies. These existed at all levels of the administrative hierarchy with the Soviet Union as a whole under the nominal control of the Supreme Soviet of the USSR, located in Moscow within the Russian SFSR.

Along with the state administrative hierarchy, there existed a parallel structure of party organizations, which allowed the Politburo to exercise large amounts of control over the republics. State administrative organs took direction from the parallel party organs, and appointments of all party and state officials required approval of the central organs of the party.

Each republic had its own unique set of state symbols: a flag, a coat of arms, and, with the exception of Russia until 1990, an anthem. Every republic of the Soviet Union also was awarded with the Order of Lenin.

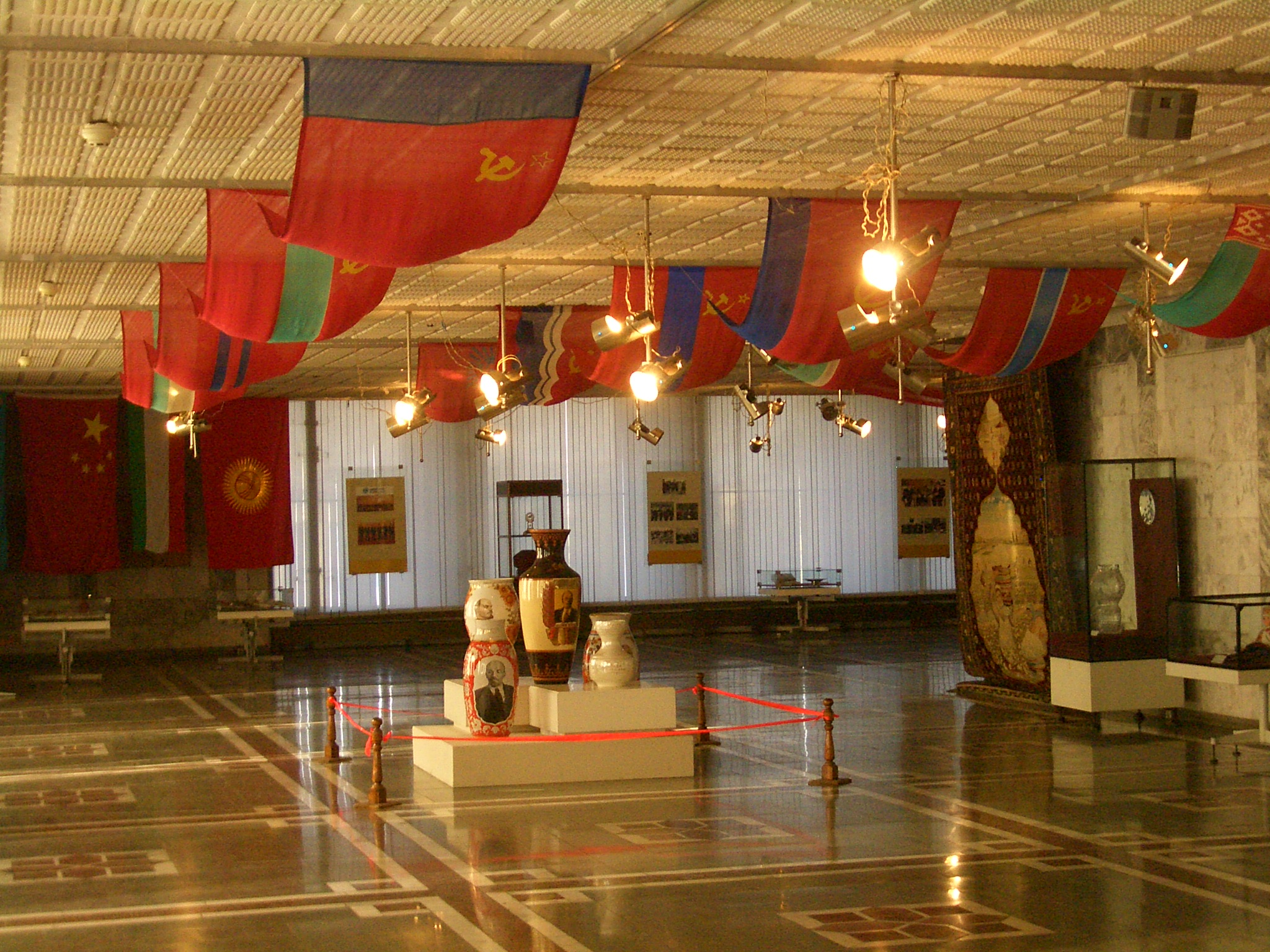
A hall in Bishkek's Soviet-era Lenin Museum decorated with the flags of Soviet Republics

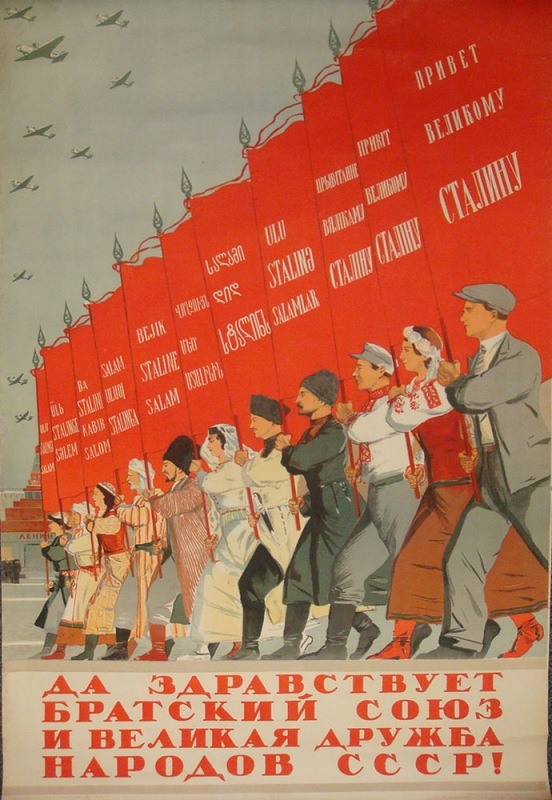
Poster of the unity of the Soviet republics in the late 1930s. All republics are shown with their respective traditional clothes, while Russian shown in modern clothes.

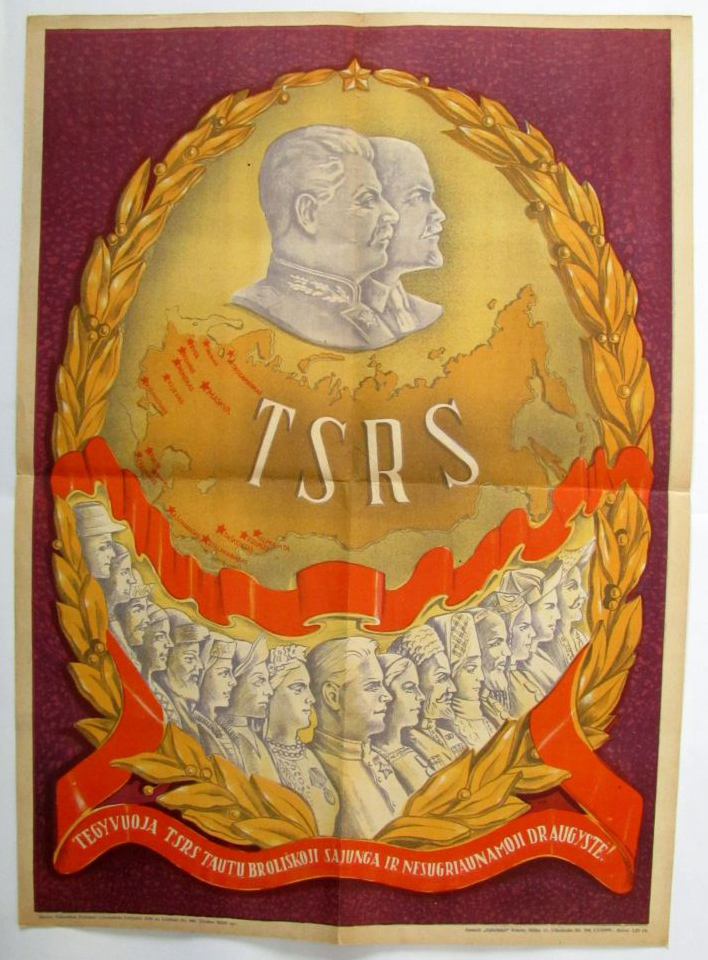
Poster of the unity of the Soviet republics in 1946. Note that the map also points out the Karelo-Finnish SSR capital, Petrozavodsk.

== Union Republics of the Soviet Union ==
Map of the Union Republics from 1956 to 1991, as numbered by the Soviet Constitution: 1. Russia, 2. Ukraine, 3. Belarus, 4. Uzbekistan, 5. Kazakhstan, 6. Georgia, 7. Azerbaijan, 8. Lithuania, 9. Moldavia, 10. Latvia, 11. Kyrgyzstan, 12. Tajikistan, 13. Armenia, 14. Turkmenistan, 15. Estonia

The number of the union republics of the USSR varied from 4 to 16. From 1956 until its dissolution in 1991, the Soviet Union consisted of 15 Soviet Socialist Republics: in 1956, the Karelo-Finnish Soviet Socialist Republic, created in 1940, was absorbed into the Russian Soviet Federative Socialist Republic. Rather than listing the republics in alphabetical order, the republics were listed in constitutional order (which roughly corresponded to their population and economic power when the republics were formed). However, particularly by the last decades of the Soviet Union, the constitutional order did not correspond to order either by population or economic power.

Emblem	Name	Flag	Capital	Official languages	Established	Union Republic status	Sovereignty	Independence	Population (1989)	Area (km^{2}) (1991)	Population density (km^{−2})	Post-Soviet and de facto states	No.
	Armenian Soviet Socialist Republic	Flag of Armenian SSR	Yerevan	Armenian, Russian	2 December 1920	5 December 1936	23 August 1990	21 September 1991	3,287,700	29,800	110.326	Armenia	13
	Azerbaijan Soviet Socialist Republic	Flag of Azerbaijan SSR	Baku	Azerbaijani, Russian	28 April 1920	5 December 1936	23 September 1989	18 October 1991	7,037,900	86,600	81.269	Azerbaijan	8
	Byelorussian Soviet Socialist Republic	Flag of Belarusian SSR	Minsk	Byelorussian, Russian	31 July 1920	30 December 1922	27 July 1990	25 August 1991	10,151,806	207,600	48.901	Belarus	3
	Estonian Soviet Socialist Republic (Note: The annexation of the Baltic republics in 1940 is considered an illegal occupation by the current Baltic governments and by a number of foreign countries. The Soviet Union considered the initial annexation legal, but officially recognized their independence on 6 September 1991, three months prior to its final dissolution)	Flag of Estonian SSR	Tallinn	Estonian, Russian	21 July 1940 (Note: Not internationally recognized, independent republic continued de jure.)	6 August 1940	16 November 1988	8 May 1990	1,565,662	45,226	34.619	Estonia	15
	Georgian Soviet Socialist Republic	Flag of Georgian SSR	Tbilisi	Georgian, Russian	25 February 1921	5 December 1936	18 November 1989	9 April 1991	5,400,841	69,700	77.487	Georgia; Abkhazia; South Ossetia	6
	Kazakh Soviet Socialist Republic	Flag of Kazakhstan SSR	Alma-Ata	Kazakh, Russian	26 August 1920 (Note: As Kazak ASSR.)	5 December 1936	25 October 1990	16 December 1991	16,711,900	2,717,300	6.150	Kazakhstan	5
	Kirghiz Soviet Socialist Republic	Flag of Kyrgyzstan SSR	Frunze	Kirghiz, Russian	11 February 1926 (Note: As Kirghiz ASSR.)	5 December 1936	15 December 1990	31 August 1991	4,257,800	198,500	21.450	Kyrgyzstan	7
	Latvian Soviet Socialist Republic	Flag of Latvian SSR	Riga	Latvian, Russian	21 July 1940	5 August 1940	28 July 1989	4 May 1990	2,666,567	64,589	41.285	Latvia	11
	Lithuanian Soviet Socialist Republic	Flag of Lithuanian SSR	Vilnius	Lithuanian, Russian	21 July 1940	3 August 1940	18 May 1989	11 March 1990	3,689,779	65,200	56.592	Lithuania	9
	Moldavian Soviet Socialist Republic	Flag of Moldovan SSR	Kishinev	Moldavian, Russian	12 October 1924 (Note: As Moldavian ASSR.)	2 August 1940	23 June 1990	27 August 1991	4,337,600	33,843	128.168	Moldova; Transnistria	10
	Russian Soviet Federative Socialist Republic	Flag of Russian SFSR	Moscow	Russian	7 November 1917	30 December 1922	12 June 1990	12 December 1991	147,386,000	17,075,400	8.631	Russia	1
	Tajik Soviet Socialist Republic	Flag of Tajikistan SSR	Dushanbe	Tajik, Russian	14 October 1924 (Note: As Tajik ASSR.)	5 December 1929	24 August 1990	9 September 1991	5,112,000	143,100	35.723	Tajikistan	12
	Turkmen Soviet Socialist Republic	Flag of Turkmenistan SSR	Ashkhabad	Turkmen, Russian	13 May 1925		27 August 1990	27 October 1991	3,522,700	488,100	7.217	Turkmenistan	14
	Ukrainian Soviet Socialist Republic	Flag of Ukrainian SSR	Kiev	Ukrainian, Russian	10 March 1919	30 December 1922	16 July 1990	24 August 1991	51,706,746	603,700	85.650	Ukraine	2
	Uzbek Soviet Socialist Republic	Flag of Uzbekistan SSR	Tashkent	Uzbek, Russian	5 December 1924		20 June 1990	1 September 1991	19,906,000	447,400	44.493	Uzbekistan	4

=== Short-lived Union Republics of the Soviet Union ===
Emblem	Name	Flag	Capital	Titular nationality	Established	Union Republic status	Abolished	Population	Area (km^{2})	Soviet successor
	Karelo-Finnish Soviet Socialist Republic	Flag of Karelo-Finnish SSR	Petrozavodsk	Karelians, Finns	25 July 1923 (Note: As Karelian ASSR.)	31 March 1940	16 July 1956	651,300 (1959)	172,400	Russian SFSR (Karelian ASSR)
	Transcaucasian Socialist Federative Soviet Republic	Flag of Transcaucasian SFSR	Tiflis	Azerbaijanis, Armenians, Georgians	12 March 1922	30 December 1922	5 December 1936	5,861,600 (1926)	186,100	Armenian SSR; Azerbaijan SSR; Georgian SSR

=== Non-union Soviet republics ===
Emblem	Name	Flag	Capital	Created	Defunct	Population	Area (km^{2})	Soviet successor
	Socialist Soviet Republic of Abkhazia^{a}		Sukhumi	1921	1931	201,016	8,600	Georgian SSR (Abkhaz ASSR)
	Bukharan People's Soviet Republic		Bukhara	1920	1924	2,000,000	182,193	Uzbek SSR
	Khorezm People's Soviet Republic		Khiva	1920	1924	800,000	62,200	Turkmen SSR; Uzbek SSR
	Far Eastern Republic		Verkhneudinsk; Chita	1920	1922			Russian SFSR
	Tuvan People's Republic		Kyzyl	1921	1944			Russian SFSR (Tuvan ASSR)
^{a} Abkhazia's status in relation to the Georgian SSR as a "treaty republic" was never clear or well-defined, making its status as a separate non-union republic disputed.

The Turkestan Soviet Federative Republic was proclaimed in 1918 but did not survive to the founding of the USSR, becoming the short-lived Turkestan Autonomous Soviet Socialist Republic of the RSFSR. The Crimean Soviet Socialist Republic (Soviet Socialist Republic of Taurida) was also proclaimed in 1918, but did not become a union republic and was made into an autonomous republic of the RSFSR, although the Crimean Tatars had a relative majority until the 1930s or 1940s according to censuses. When the Tuvan People's Republic joined the Soviet Union in 1944, it did not become a union republic, and was instead established as an autonomous republic of the RSFSR.

In 1944, ideas of accession were circulating among a number of Mongolian intellectuals and political figures, but the leader of the Mongolian People's Republic at the time, Khorloogiin Choibalsan dismissed and blocked the issue in late 1944 as "useless banter," adding that raising it was "untimely, and even harmful." His successor, Yumjaagiin Tsedenbal, supported the idea, though nothing substantial came of it.

The leader of the People's Republic of Bulgaria, Todor Zhivkov, suggested in 1963 and again in the early 1970s that the country should become a union republic, but the offer was rejected. Nikita Khrushchev rejected the idea because he thought Zhivkov wanted "easy access to higher living standards" by becoming a union republic. Whilst Leonid Brezhnev would reject the later proposal because he saw it as diplomatically impracticable. Though it can be said that Zhivkov created such proposal as a bargaining chip to secure financial and economic support in consolidating his rule, rather than as a genuine plan for union.

During the Soviet–Afghan War, the Chicago Tribune interviewed a defector who claimed that the Soviet Union proposed to annex Northern Afghanistan as its 16th union republic, to be called the "Afghan Soviet Socialist Republic."

=== Other defunct Soviet states ===
- Ukrainian People's Republic of Soviets (1917–1918) → Ukrainian Soviet Republic (1918)
- Bessarabian Soviet Socialist Republic (1919)
- Socialist Soviet Republic of Lithuania and Belorussia (1919–1920)
- Galician Soviet Socialist Republic (1920)

== Autonomous Republics of the Soviet Union ==
Several of the Union Republics themselves, most notably Russia, were further subdivided into Autonomous Soviet Socialist Republics (ASSRs). Though administratively part of their respective Union Republics, ASSRs were also established based on ethnic/cultural lines.

On April 3, 1990, a law was passed which stated that when a union republic was voting to leave the Soviet Union, autonomous republics, autonomous oblasts, and autonomous okrugs had the right, by means of a referendum, to independently resolve whether they would stay in the USSR or leave with the seceding union republic, as well as broader rights to raise the issue of their state-legal status.

== Dissolution of the Soviet Union ==
Starting in the late 1980s, under the rule of Mikhail Gorbachev, the Soviet government undertook a program of political reforms (glasnost and perestroika) intended to liberalise and revitalise the Union. These measures, however, had a number of unintended political and social effects. Political liberalisation allowed the governments of the union republics to openly express sentiments related to nationalism. In addition, the loosening of political restrictions led to fractures within the Communist Party which resulted in a reduced ability to govern the Union effectively. The rise of nationalist and right-wing movements, notably led by Boris Yeltsin in Russia, in the previously homogeneous political system undermined the Union's foundations. With the central role of the Communist Party removed from the constitution, the Party lost its control over the State machinery and was banned from operating after an attempted coup d'état.

Throughout this period of turmoil, the Soviet government attempted to find a new structure that would reflect the increased authority of the republics. Some autonomous republics, like Tatarstan, Checheno-Ingushetia, Abkhazia, South Ossetia, Crimea, Transnistria, Gagauzia sought the union statute in the New Union Treaty. Efforts to found a New Union Treaty, however, proved unsuccessful and the republics began to secede from the Union. By 6 September 1991, the Soviet Union's State Council recognized the independence of Estonia, Latvia and Lithuania bringing the number of union republics down to 12. On 8 December 1991, the remaining leaders of the republics signed the Belavezha Accords which agreed that the USSR would be dissolved and replaced with a Commonwealth of Independent States. On 25 December, President Gorbachev announced his resignation and turned all executive powers over to Yeltsin. The next day the Council of Republics voted to dissolve the Union. Since then, the republics have been governed independently with some reconstituting themselves as liberal parliamentary republics and others, particularly in Central Asia, devolving into highly autocratic states under the leadership of the old Party elite.

=== Republics not recognized by the Soviet Union ===
As numerous ASSRs declared sovereignty and self-promotion to Soviet Socialist Republics, Art. 71 and 72 of the Constitution of the RSFSR were amended on May 24, 1991 to recognize its autonomous republics as SSRs; it was further amended on July 3 to promote all its autonomous oblasts other than Jewish Autonomous Oblast to SSRs. This decision came into conflict with Art. 85 of the Constitution of the USSR.

Emblem	Name	Flag	Capital	Official languages	Proclaimed	Sovereignty	Population	Area (km^{2})	Post-Soviet subject
	Abkhaz Soviet Socialist Republic		Sukhumi	Abkhaz, Georgian, Russian	25 August 1990		525,061 (1989)	8,600 (1989)	Abkhazia
	Pridnestrovian Moldavian Soviet Socialist Republic		Tiraspol	Russian, Ukrainian, Moldovan	2 September 1990	8 December 1990	680,000 (1989)	4,163 (1989)	Transnistria
	South Ossetian Soviet Democratic Republic		Tskhinvali	Ossetian, Russian	20 September 1990		99,102 (1989)	3,900 (1989)	South Ossetia

== See also ==
- Flags of the Soviet Republics
- Emblems of the Soviet Republics
- Commonwealth of Independent States
- Eurasian Economic Union
- National delimitation in the Soviet Union
- Bavarian Soviet Republic
- Hungarian Soviet Republic
- Slovak Soviet Republic
- Limerick Soviet
- Paris Commune
- Provisional Polish Revolutionary Committee (Polish SSR)
- Republics of Russia
- Federal subjects of Russia
- Post-Soviet states (former Soviet Republics)
