= Transnistria (disambiguation) =

Transnistria is an unrecognised state that unilaterally split from Moldova after the dissolution of the USSR. In English, Transnistria refers to itself as Pridnestrovie, a Russian-language equivalent of Transnistria. It is usually officially referred to in Moldova as the Left Bank of the Dniester (Romanian: Stînga Nistrului or Stânga Nistrului).

Transnistria may also refer to:

- Moldavian Soviet Socialist Republic, the predecessor of modern Moldova
- Pridnestrovian Moldavian Soviet Socialist Republic, a breakaway of the Moldavian SSR
- Transnistria Governorate, a governorate of Romania during World War II
- Administrative-Territorial Units of the Left Bank of the Dniester, an administrative unit of the Republic of Moldova
- Transnistria conflict, an ongoing political conflict
  - Transnistria War, the most violent phase of the Transnistria conflict
- Prydnistrovya, a village in the Ivano-Frankivsk Oblast in Ukraine
