= Order of Freedom =

Order of Freedom (sometimes Order of the Freedom) may refer to:

- Order of Freedom (Bosnia and Herzegovina)
- Order of Freedom (Iran)
- Order of Freedom (Kosovo)
- Order of Liberty - Portuguese honorific civil order
- Order of Freedom (Moldova)
- Order of Liberty (Ukraine)
- Order of Freedom (Yugoslavia) - Yugoslavian military decoration
