= Rudic (surname) =

Rudic is a surname. Notable people with the surname include:

- Laurance Rudic (born 1952), British theatre artist
- Steven Rudic (born 1976), Australian boxer, martial artist, and model
- Valeriu Rudic (born 1947), Moldovan scientist

== See also ==
- Rudić, Serbo-Croatian surname
