= Delegation of the European Union to Moldova =

Coordinates: 47°01′46.4″N 28°49′17.8″E

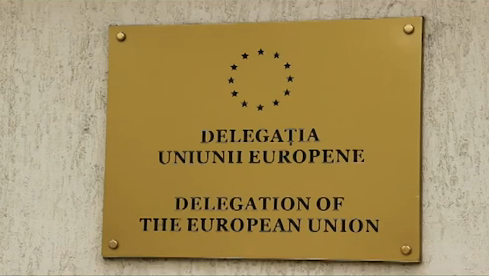
- Location: Chișinău
- Address: Mitropolit Petru Movilă Street no.10
- Ambassador: Iwona Piórko

The Delegation of the European Union to Moldova (Romanian: Delegația Uniunii Europene în Republica Moldova) was established to facilitate relations between Moldova and the European Union. It is located in Moldova's capital, Chișinău.

== History ==
The European Commission opened up a new office in Moldova on October 6, 2005, headed by Cesare de Montis. The interim President of Moldova, Mihai Ghimpu, awarded the Honour Order to Cesare de Montis in October 2009 at the end of his mandate in Moldova.

The Head of the European Union Delegation to Moldova has been Ambassador Dirk Steffen Schuebel since November 2009. Before, Dirk Schuebel was the Deputy Head of the Delegation of the European Commission to Ukraine.

In April 2013, the appointment of Pirkka Tapiola as new Head of the EU Delegation to Moldova was announced. Tapiola was followed in 2017 by Peter Michalko, who in turn was followed by Janis Mazeiks in 2021.

The Delegation of the European Union to Moldova is located at 10 Mitropolit Petru Movilă Street, in Buiucani, Chișinău.

== See also ==
- Moldova–European Union relations
