= Pridnestrovian Moldavian Soviet Socialist Republic =

Short-lived non-recognized Soviet republic

Official names
- - Russian: Приднестровская Молдавская Советская Социалистическая Республика
  - Moldovan (Romanian): Република Советикэ Сочиалистэ Молдовеняскэ Нистрянэ (Republica Sovietică Socialistă Moldovenească Nistreană)
  - Ukrainian: Придністровська Молдавська Радянська Соціалістична Республіка
- 1990–1991
- Flag Emblem
- Motto: "Workers of the world, unite!" Romanian: Proletari din toate țările, uniți-vă! Пролетарь дин тоате цэриле, уници-вэ! (Moldovan Cyrillic); Russian: Пролетарии всех стран, соединяйтесь!, romanized: Proletarii vsekh stran, soyedinyaytes'! Ukrainian: Пролетарі всіх країн, єднайтеся!, romanized: Proletari vsikh krayin, ednaytesya!
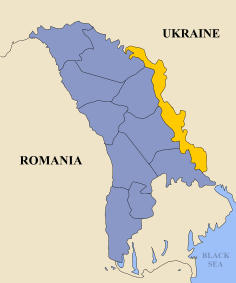
- Location of Pridnestrovian Moldavian Soviet Socialist Republic (orange)
- Capital: Tiraspol
- Common languages: Moldovan (Romanian); Russian; Ukrainian
- Government: Soviet republic under an interim government
- Chairman
  - 1990–1991: Igor Smirnov (at independence)
- Legislature: Supreme Soviet
- History
  - Established: 2 September 1990
  - Independence: 25 August 1991
  - Succeeded by Pridnestrovian Moldavian Republic: 5 November 1991
  - Disestablished: 1991
  - Start of the Transnistria War: 2 March 1992
- Currency: Soviet ruble (SUR)
Preceded by	Succeeded by
Moldavian SSR	Transnistria
- Today part of: Moldova (de jure) Transnistria (de facto)

The Pridnestrovian Moldavian Soviet Socialist Republic (Note: Romanian: Republica Sovietică Socialistă Moldovenească Nistreană, Moldovan Cyrillic: Република Советикэ Сочиалистэ Молдовеняскэ Нистрянэ; Russian: Приднестровская Молдавская Советская Социалистическая Республика, romanized: Pridnestrovskaya Moldavskaya Sovetskaya Sotsialisticheskaya Respublika; Ukrainian: Придністровська Молдавська Радянська Соціалістична Республіка, romanized: Prydnistrovs'ka Moldavs'ka Radians'ka Sotsialistychna Respublika) (PMSSR), also commonly known as Soviet Transnistria or simply as Transnistria, was created on the eastern periphery of the Moldavian Soviet Socialist Republic (MSSR) in 1990 by pro-Soviet separatists who hoped to remain within the Soviet Union when it became clear that the MSSR would achieve independence from the USSR and possibly unite with Romania. The PMSSR was never recognised as a Soviet republic by the authorities in either Moscow or Chișinău. In 1991, the Pridnestrovian Moldavian Republic succeeded the Pridnestrovian Moldavian Soviet Socialist Republic.

== MASSR and MSSR ==
The Moldavian Soviet Socialist Republic from which the PMSSR seceded was created in 1940 following the Soviet annexation of territory belonging to the Kingdom of Romania. When Bessarabia was ceded to the Soviet Union as a result of an ultimatum, it was combined with a strip of land on the left bank of the Dniester which had formed the nucleus of a Moldavian Autonomous Soviet Socialist Republic (MASSR), an autonomous republic of the Ukrainian Soviet Socialist Republic with Tiraspol as its executive capital, throughout the interwar period.

The newly fused territory became the Moldavian Soviet Socialist Republic and was quickly sovietized. In this process of collectivization and "dekulakization", the left bank of the Dniester had a clear advantage: the territory had been collectivized during the First Five-Year Plan (FFYP) during the 1930s, it had enjoyed a reasonable amount of industrialisation, and boasted relatively experienced, trustworthy cadres.

The MASSR had been formed on the basis of what Terry Martin has termed the Soviet "Piedmont Principle": by creating a "homeland" for Moldovans across the Romanian border, the Soviet leadership hoped to advance their claims on Romanian territory. While the role of the MASSR in the Soviet Union's eventual incorporation of this land was negligible—the Soviet ultimatum to Romania did not mention the Moldovan nation, let alone use its right to national self-determination as justification for the invasion—the former autonomous republic did provide a Soviet elite ready to assume leadership in the new union republic.

== Perestroika in the Moldavian SSR ==
In the second half of the 1980s, Mikhail Gorbachev set the political context for the war in Transnistria and redefined the political process in the union republics with a series of reforms that comprised his program for perestroika. While intended to reinvigorate the Soviet system, perestroika also undermined the strength of key institutions which provided for central control of the Soviet Union. Inadvertently undermining the power of the communist party, Gorbachev set the stage for a devolution of power into a federated state structure which essentially resulted in the devolution of power to the governments of the fifteen Soviet republics. This devolution of centralized power to republican legislatures ("soviets" in the terminology of the Soviet Union) was matched by a simultaneous explosion of mass participation in the now open debate about the Soviet future.

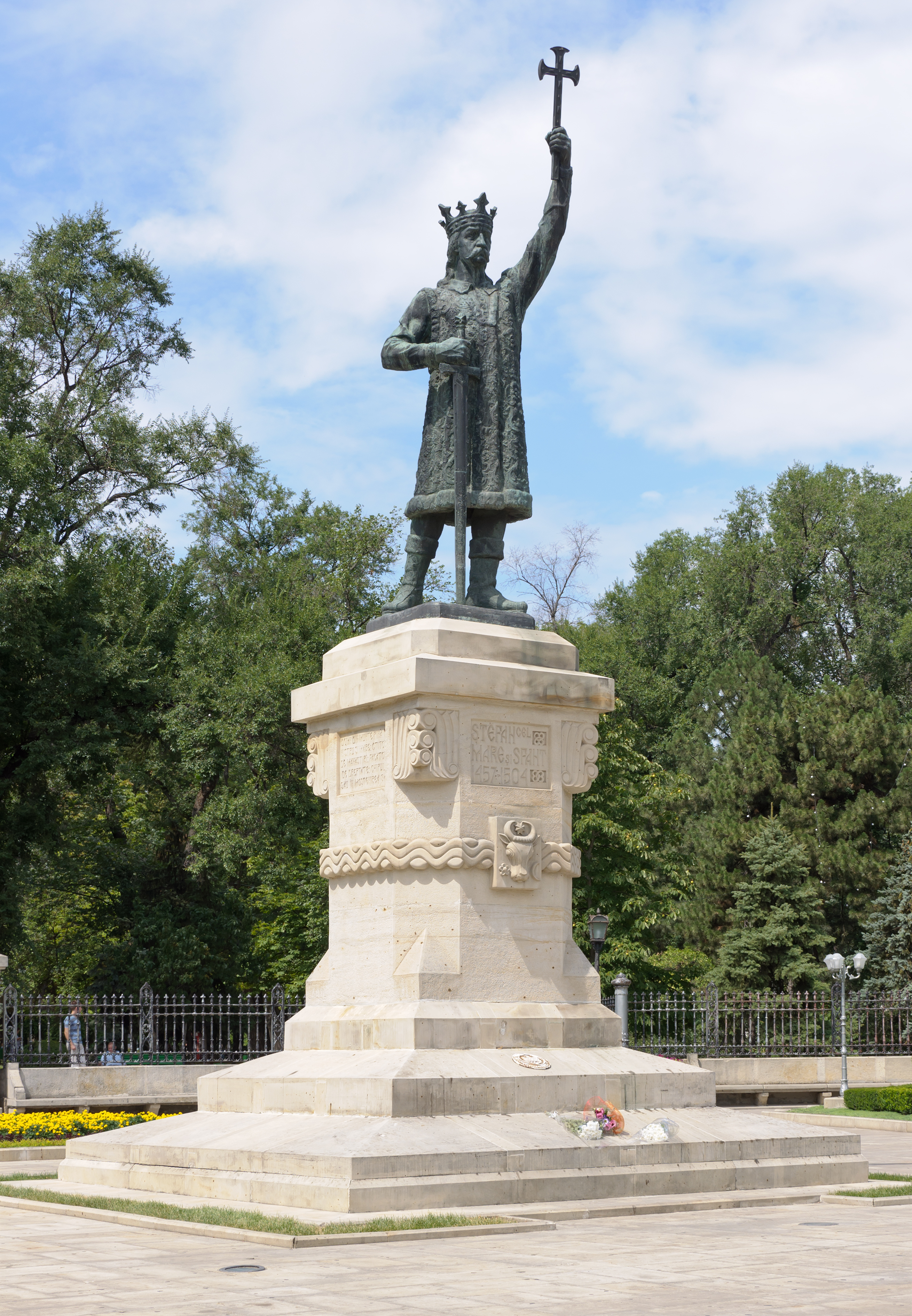
The monument to Stephen III of Moldavia, a symbol of historical Moldovan greatness, and a frequent meeting place for activists in 1988 and 1989

In the Moldavian Soviet Socialist Republic, as elsewhere in the Soviet Union, political activity was expressed in various ways, including by organizing groups and clubs independent of the government that had long withheld the right of association to any sort of civil organization. Two sets of concerns were particularly prominent in the debates that accompanied the opening of political dialogue in the late 1980s. The first was concern for the ecologic devastation that was so characteristic of Soviet industrial society. The second, and increasingly ascendant concern revolved around the Moldovan language and whether it was distinct from the Romanian language or not, and national heritage, which many felt had been trammeled by Soviet and Russian domination.

These concerns found expression in the activism of the Moldovan Movement in Support of Restructuring—a movement of the intelligentsia oriented mostly towards generalized economic and political liberalization—and the Alexei Mateevici Literary-Musical Club, which pulled together prominent cultural and political figures, activists and citizens to celebrate and discuss the language, literature and history of the Moldovans. Cultural revival was just one of the issues championed by such informals in early 1988. However, during the course of that year events around the Soviet Union, and particularly the bloody clashes between Armenians and Azerbaijanis in Nagorno-Karabakh and the pogrom against Armenians in Sumgait, brought issues of ethnicity increasingly to the fore in the union press. In Moldova, social movements increasingly began to focus on three issues involving language: the identity of the Moldovan language and whether it was separate from the Romanian language or not, the alleged artificiality of the use of the Cyrillic alphabet for this supposed Moldovan language, and need for Moldovan to be given the status of official language of the republic. By June 1988, the Moldovan republican government began taking its cue from social movement leaders and discussing these issues, touching off the events that culminated in the creation of the Transnistrian state.

Social mobilization came late to the eastern cities that became the centers of pro-Pridnestrovian activity (mid-1989) and it followed a different model than it did in western (Bessarabian) Moldova. Social mobilization in Tiraspol and Tighina (Bender) was mostly achieved through workplace networks called Work Collective Councils Work Collective Soviets (sovety trudovykh kollektivov, STKs). The mobilization in Transnistria was a reaction to the national revivalist mobilization in Bessarabian Moldova. Russian-speaking workers in the eastern factories and Moldovans with a strong identification with the Soviet state used work collective councils to organize opposition to national revivalists in the Moldovan capital. The councils were created throughout the Soviet Union in 1987 with the "Law on State Enterprises" as part of the perestroika reforms. They were intended to foster democratization and increase efficiency in Soviet industry. However, they were also ready-made forums for debate and provided a structure which activists used to take control of Moldovan industry in late 1989. The national revivalist movements were created essentially from scratch and led by cultural figures. The "internationalist" (pro-Soviet) movement in Transnistria took advantage of workplace institutions to build a countermovement and looked to engineers and factory managers for leadership.

== The Supreme Soviet discusses language law ==
Newly empowered by the weakened CPSU, and increasingly pressured by the ascendant movement for national reawakening, the Moldavian Supreme Soviet (which became the Moldovan legislature in June 1990) announced the creation of a body—the Interdepartmental Commission for the Study of the History and Problems of the Development of Moldovan—to research the language question and make recommendations. Staffed as it was with Moldova's Romanianized cultural elite, the commission recommended the republican government accept all three points of the national revivalists' demands. (That is (1) the identity of the Moldovan and Romanian language, (2) the artificiality of the use of the Cyrillic alphabet for the Moldovan language, and (3) need for Moldovan to be given the status of official language of the republic. See above.) Armed with these recommendations, the Supreme Soviet asked for the draft legislation to be presented in March for "public discussion" of the proposals "before the next session of the Supreme Soviet" in August. This move did nothing to diffuse the inevitable tension involved with the very project. Proponents mobilized to expand the legally protected role of the state language and push the Supreme Soviet to recognize the identity of Moldovan and Romanian while opponents mobilized to protect the legal status quo. A further draft leaked in August further escalated tensions because its opponents believed that it was even more pro-nationalist and radical than the first draft.

The law was passed in a stormy Supreme Soviet session on 31 August 1989. It declared that "The state language of Moldovan Soviet Socialist Republic is Moldovan. The state language is used in political, economic, social and cultural life and functions on the basis of the Latin alphabet." However, it went on to promise protection of Russian and other languages of Moldova's minority populations. The passage of the language laws was accompanied by massive rallies outside the legislature building in Chișinău with upwards of 500,000 people gathered in a "Grand National Assembly" in Chișinău's Victory Square outside of the Supreme Soviet building to show their support. Elsewhere in Chișinău and other cities, smaller rallies voiced opposition. The most effective opposition came in the form of a massive strike movement that originated in the Transnistrian city of Tiraspol.

== Strikers and strike breakers ==
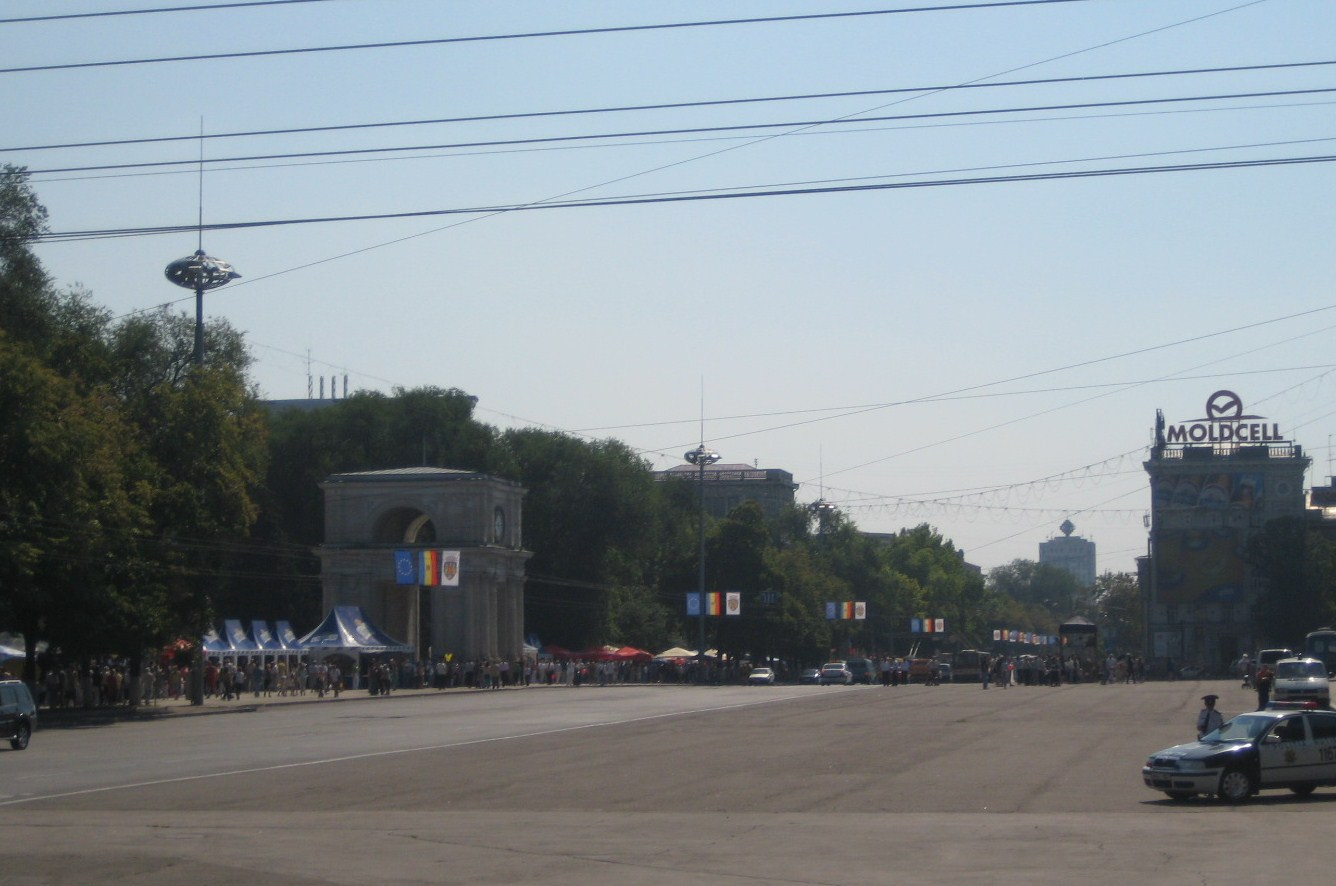
Victory Square as it appeared during language day celebrations commemorating the passage of the language laws in 2008

While the group Intermovement-"Unitate-Edinstvo" ("Unity") was the first to organize significant opposition to the language legislation, more effective activity began in the workplace. STKs became the focus around which opposition activity turned in the early part of the conflict. In Transnistria, close-knit work collectives were ready-made institutional alternatives to the Communist Party cells—also omnipresent at the Soviet workplace. From 1989 to 1991, many Transnistrian party members handed in their party cards or simply stopped paying their dues. By the end of August 1989, STKs had de facto control over their factories throughout much of Transnistria. Often they worked with or were dominated by, factory management. Occasionally, they effectively ousted unsympathetic directors or staff.

Many that were to become active in the strike campaign had been suspicious of the language legislation from the beginning—they suspected this to be the first step towards "nationalization" of the republic at the expense of "their country," the Soviet Union. However, on 10 August 1989 I. M. Zaslavskii, a deputy to the Moldavian Supreme Soviet and resident of the Transnistrian city of Tiraspol, leaked a new draft of the law to the factory newspaper of the "Tochlitmash" Tiraspol Machine-Building Factory im. Kirova. Seeing that the new version would establish Moldovan as the only official language of the MSSR, activists from a number of Tiraspol factories came together to create the United Work Collective Council (Ob"edinnennyi Sovet trudovykh kollektivov, OSTK) and called an immediate strike that eventually led to the shutdown of most major industrial activity (concentrated in the Transnistrian region) throughout the SSR. The OSTK began using the STKs in the same way the party had used its cells.

The peak of the strike movement came in September 1989 in the immediate aftermath of the MSSR Supreme Soviet's passage of the language legislation. Vladimir Socor, analyst for the Radio Free Europe/Radio Liberty, places the total number of strikers in the MSSR at close to 200,000, writing, "By August 29, when the session of the Moldavian Supreme Soviet convened, more than 100,000 workers and employees at over 100 enterprises were on strike in the republic; their numbers almost doubled within four days." This level of mobilization was not long sustained. In part convinced that the language legislation would not be repealed, and in part reassured by the sympathetic conclusions of a commission sent by the Supreme Soviet of the Soviet Union, the OSTK (temporarily embodied in the United Republican Strike Committee) decided to end the strike on 15 September 1989.

The strike failed in its immediate goal—to prevent the passage of the language legislation—but it did provide a watershed in Transnistrian history; after the strike, the left bank of the Dniester, and in particular the city of Tiraspol, were essentially controlled by a group of engineers and factory managers hostile to the government in Chișinău, a group that controls Transnistria to this day. In the days immediately before the language legislation was considered by the Moldovan Supreme Soviet the OSTK began issuing a series of very credible threats to the local and republican leadership. At the same time as it was organizing industrial strikes the central committee of the OSTK began sending resolutions to the local government of Tiraspol demanding that the city leadership recognize and support OSTK control over factories and eventually flatly informed the city government that the OSTK had decided to "take the responsibility on itself for the support of social order and discipline in production, and for the provision of normal life for the population of the city in the period of the deteriorating situation." In effect, the OSTK leveraged its popular support in factories and their neighborhoods as well as its institutional entrenchment to prod local government acting on their behalf in Chișinău and to warn the Supreme Soviet away from its intended course.

The OSTK did receive some support from local politicians in the larger eastern cities (Tiraspol, Tighina, and Rîbnița). The city governments of all three cities appealed to the Moldovan Supreme Soviet to postpone making a decision on the language question. The leaders of the communist organization in these cities, however, claimed that they did this just to defuse the explosive situation. For example, Evgenii Berdnikov of Rȋbniţa said "We could not stop this process," at a meeting with Moldovan First Secretary, Semion Grossu. "We were only trying to direct it out of the hands of incompetent people that play on people's emotions." The concession made, he explained, could be quietly dropped at a later time.

While the strikes were extremely effective in paralyzing Moldovan industry, there were many instances were individuals and groups happy with the language legislation managed to win the day and keep their factories open. Moreover, some workers organized anti-strike committees to fight against the activities of the OSTK. Supreme Soviet Deputy from Tiraspol and firm supporter of the language laws, Leonida Dicusar, talked in September about the extreme pressure experienced by those brave few who worked to keep the factories open in the face of overwhelming odds. "I had a meeting with representatives of the anti-strike committee of one enterprise," she told fellow central committee members. "They told me about how they heroically withstood pressure, blackmail, belittling, and insults during the strike from the Russophone population." Elsewhere, the OSTK even had to give in to resistance. On 26 August the director of a textiles factory in Rȋbniţa told the city strike committee that the factory committee was not in control of the situation. "Between the workers there had been fights and scandals. A part of the weavers, about 1000 people, want to return to work and the rest were against them." In light of the potentially explosive situation, the factory director asked the factory and city strike committees to consider reopening. In this case, the city strike committee conceded. Far more common, however, national revivalist individuals were isolated and vulnerable. Ilie Ilașcu, famous for having a Transnistrian court sentence him to death in 1992 for terrorism on behalf of the Moldovan state, is one such example. As head economist of one Tiraspol factory, he was derided as "head extremist" by coworkers before he was fired. His employer reinstated Ilaşcu after he protested with the city prosecutor, but he continued to clash with coworkers and local authorities as the city's branch chairman of the Popular Front of Moldova.

== The Troubled Winter of 1989–1990 ==
In both Transnistria and western Moldova, the winter of 1989–1990 was strained. In Chișinău, a popular movement for national revival and national sovereignty was in full force. Activists defied the communist party openly and consistently and in some cases, communist officials and symbols were publicly attacked. In Transnistria, activists for the opposing social movement were less of a presence on the streets, but the communist party attempted to reassert its power in the area after being marginalized by the OSTK in the summer and fall. In both cases it was a tense winter as the communist party attempted to regain control of the republic in the face of revolts from two directions: one the national revivalists and the other to pro-Soviets.

In October the communist party began attempting to reassert its power in the eastern cities. During the strike, the city committees and city soviets of the eastern cities had allowed the OSTK to deeply insinuate itself into city government structures; after the strike, city communist leaders tried to take the initiative back into their own hands. For example, cooperation with the OSTK in the city soviets led deputies in Tiraspol, Tighina, and Rîbnița to suspend the introduction of the language laws and deputies in Tiraspol and Rȋbniţa to agree to a referendum on the creation of a Transnistrian autonomous republic. Once the strike was over, however, communist leaders attempted to roll back these concessions. The republican communist party leaders in Chișinău were especially keen to see this happen and put pressure on local communists to repeal "illegal" decisions taken during the strike. In a meeting in October, Associate Chair of the Presidium of the Moldovan Supreme Soviet, Victor Pușcaș, in the presence of Communist Party First Secretary, Semion Grossu, berated local communists for losing control of the situation in Transnistria. It would look better for the city soviets to repeal all illegal decisions by themselves, he concluded. "However," he warned, "if you cannot get them to repeal these resolutions, we will do it for them." Back home, the first secretaries of the eastern cities convened plenums of the city committees and sessions of the city soviets. Some OSTK members were allowed to attend and participate, but Semion Grossu attended in order to keep an eye on the proceedings and make sure the sessions went as planned. The local communist party meetings called on the city soviets to bring local law into accordance with republican law and decisions adopted by the local soviets supported acceptance of the language laws in Transnistria. Communist-run state media also criticized the OSTK and local communists attempted to shut down OSTK newspapers, a measure that prevented the organization from putting out its publication for much of late 1989.

The situation was even more tense in Chișinău in late 1989. Festivals on 7 November commemorating the Russian Revolution and 10 November celebrating the Soviet police force offered excellent opportunities for oppositionists to challenge authorities in highly visible settings and disrupt events of premiere importance to the Soviet regime. Popular Front activists, often going beyond the official sanction of the movement leadership, organized actions that embarrassed the republican leadership, ultimately resulted in riots in Central Chișinău. This unrest sealed the fate of the increasingly weak Moldovan First Secretary. At the end of a year that had seen Semion Grossu and his organization pummeled from both the national revivalist right and the "ultrarevolutionary" internationalist left, Moscow replaced the First Secretary in a snap Central Committee plenum in mid-November.

== The February 1990 elections ==
The February 1990 elections proved to be a turning point in the conflict between Moldova and Transnistria. In these elections, Moldovian national revivalists won a large number of seats in the Republican Supreme Soviet (republican legislature) as well as the Chișinău city soviet while OSTK supporters won an overwhelming victory in the city soviets of the big cities in Transnistria. With the communist party severely weakened, the OSTK, in essence, took control of local government in Transnistria.

The elections themselves were to unfold with an unprecedented level of freedom. Throughout the Soviet Union elections in 1990 brought a rush of new blood into Soviet government and Moldova was no exception. The registration of candidates was done in a new and more open manner and candidates had an unprecedented freedom to campaign and distinguish themselves from competitors. All in all one specialist has judged the 1990 elections in Moldova to be relatively "quite open."

When the votes were counted after February 25, republic wide, the big winner was the Popular Front of Moldova and their allies in the reformist wing of the Communist Party of Moldova. Of the 380 seats in the Supreme Soviet of the Moldovan Soviet Socialist Republic, the Popular Front would control 101, or about 27 percent. The internationalists had a strong showing as well, capturing almost 80 seats—21 percent. However, while both sides claimed the support of those not formally tied to their organizations, the Popular Front had considerably more allies. The Communist Party had a more disappointing if not insignificant showing, with 53 of the parliamentary seats going to members of the party apparatus and with its members comprising 83 percent of those elected. However, what is of interest to this chapter is that in 1990 as the republic polarized to the point of schism in September, those apparatus workers that were elected quickly aligned themselves with either the Popular Front and the parliamentary leadership, or with the OSTK-led opposition. There was no significant correlation between apparatus work and either movement.

In Transnistria, the OSTK was extremely successful, particularly in Tiraspol. Looking at the electoral ads run in the Tiraspol Dnestrovskaia Pravda reveals that of the 40 people who ran ads in that newspaper between January and March 1990, 22 (55 percent) mentioned membership of the OSTK, 21 (95 percent) of which won their seats. Of the 18 that did not mention the OSTK in their ads, only 3 (16 percent) won their seats. Moreover, in this election Igor Smirnov, (later to become in December 1991 the first president of the Pridnestrovian Moldovan Republic), first successfully ran for public office. To illustrate the point that the election signalled the change in city leadership from that of the Communist Party to that of the OSTK, Smirnov ran for the position of chairman of the city Soviet (head of local government) against the secretary of the city Communist Party committee; in the March 23rd session that decided the issue Smirnov took the chairmanship with 86 of the 134 votes, defeating Leonid Turcan with 64% of the vote. Events in Tighina and Rîbnița were similar, with OSTK leaders taking control of local government. The OSTK had only a tenuous hold, however, on the city government of Dubasari and was a minority in some of the more rural districts.

== Creation of the Dniester State ==
Throughout 1990, OSTK-controlled soviets in Transnistria battled with republican authorities in Chișinău, many of the latter also elected in 1990 and that on a platform of Moldovian national awakening. On 27 April 1990, the Supreme Soviet of Moldova took the symbolic step of adopting a new republican flag based on the yellow, red and blue Romanian flag. This highly visible sign of defiance against the Soviet government served as the pretext for the first big showdown between the republican government in Chișinău and the OSTK-controlled soviets in Transnistria. Within three days, the Tiraspol city soviet announced that it did not accept the new flag. In the territory under its jurisdiction, the flag of the Soviet Union was to be used until that time when the city soviet deputies could decide on permanent symbols. Although the Moldovan Supreme Soviet annulled this decision on May 4, the city soviets of Tighina and Rîbnița soon followed suit on the 5th and 8th respectively. The continued defiance prompted the Moldovan government to pass a law on May 10 making the acceptance of the new flag legally binding. However, although the police and the court system were largely still loyal to the government in Chișinău, Supreme Soviet deputies were not willing to provoke the sort of outcry that would certainly have arisen if Moldovan officials had gone as far as arresting leading Transnistrian politicians. In the event, the Supreme Soviet continued to fume as events continued to progress in Transnistria. However, it was at a loss as to how to stop them. In mid-May, the Tighina city soviet declared its intention to hold a referendum on the creation of the Dniester Republic. The Supreme Soviet again annulled this decision and forbade the holding of such a referendum. The republican government was, however, increasingly seeing the limits of its power to control lawmakers in Transnistria. Over the objections of the authorities in Chișinău, the Tighina city soviet held the election in July and then used the results as a further justification for separatist action. This pattern continued throughout the year.

The First Congress of People's Deputies from all levels of Transnistrian Government. Present, after Viktor Emel'ianov (third from the left), are Grigore Mărăcuță, P. Skripnichenko, V. Voevodin, Boris Ștefan, B. Akulov, Anna Volkova, P. Denisenko, V. Ryliakov, V. Bodnar, G. Popov, V. Zagriadskii, and P. Zalozhkov.

Quickly moving down the unprecedented path of secession from a union republic, left-bank city and raion soviets needed a popular mandate to justify their extreme actions. They laid claim to this mandate through a referendum campaign that swept through the Dniester area in 1990. In this campaign, citizens were asked to vote on a variety of issues—whether or not to create a Transnistrian state; which alphabet to use for the Moldovan language, which was to be defended; whether or not to accept the new Moldovan flag and others. Indeed, referendums constituted an act of defiance in and of themselves as the Moldovan government routinely declared the organization of such referendums illegal and routinely nullified the results.

On September 2, 1990, in the face of the Moldovan declaration of sovereignty from the Soviet Union and with a growing mandate from the referendum campaign sweeping the Dniester region, delegates to the Second Congress of Transnistrian Deputies announced the creation of the Pridnestrovian Moldavian Soviet Socialist Republic.

With the declaration of the PMSSR, city and raion soviets throughout Transnistria convened plenums and discussed the possibility of integrating themselves into the new republic. While many of the soviet deputies were those same delegates that participated in the Second Congress, these votes were not always uncontested affairs; in the case of the Dubăsari raion, the soviet refused to place itself under the jurisdiction of the Dniester state. In the Dubăsari city soviet, an organ with OSTK preponderance but not dominance, the majority prevailed with the support of only 49 of the 86 deputies (57%). While results were more one sided elsewhere, everywhere confusion abounded. Many governmental institutions—the police, public prosecutors, judges—remained loyal to the government in Chișinău; some enterprises or villages defected from one local soviet to another to end up on the right side; paramilitary men competed with police to provide law and order, and during 1991 began attempting to evict them from their former stations. Even in Tiraspol, consolidation was to take upwards of a year.

== Opposition to PMSSR ==
While the PMSSR was popular in Transnistria's cities, there was considerable opposition in rural communities. While OSTK supporters took control of city soviets in 1990, this was not the case in most of the raion soviets with their agricultural constituencies. The new leadership of the Grigoriopol raion soviet did not support the separatist movement and the new Dubăsari and Slobozia raion soviets actively supported the government in Chișinău.

Occasionally rural loyalists expressed their opposition with appeals and rallies. This was the case on 16 September 1990 when a meeting against the PMSSR was held in the village Lunga, near Dubăsari, with participants from all over Transnistria.

The loyalist raion soviets expressed their opposition by flying the Moldovan flag, and refusing to accept the jurisdiction of Tiraspol. On 17 September the Moldovan government held a working session in Dubăsari in the building of the raion soviet which was loyal to the central authorities in Chișinău.

Moreover, many Transnistrian civil servants, including the police, employees of the public prosecutor's, and employees of the court system remained loyal to the government in Chișinău. These were often the targets of violence and intimidation as Transnistrian authorities attempted to take control of loyalist governmental institutions. Seizing these state institutions took more than a year, and it was finished only after the War of Transnistria.

== Key participants ==
The key participants in the creation of the PMSSR were almost entirely from the ranks of Soviet industrial workers and factory administration.

- Igor Nikolaevich Smirnov: Born in Petropavlovsk-Kamchatsky, Russia; director of the "Electromash" factory, 1987–1989; elected Peoples' Deputy to the Tiraspol city soviet, 1990; chairman of the Tiraspol city soviet; elected chair of PMSSR Provisional Supreme Soviet in September 1990; elected Chairman of the Republic of the PMSSR, 1990; elected President of PMR in December 1991.
- Anatolii Ivanovich Bol'shakov: (b. 1930) general director of the Tiraspol 'Tochlitmash' Factory; Hero of Socialist Labor; deputy to the MSSR Supreme Soviet (recurrently); organizer of Interdvizhenie; deputy to the OSTK from the 'Tochlitmash' factory STK from August 1989.
- Viktor V. Diukarev: among the organizers of Dubăsari Interdvizheniie initiative group in 1989; elected Peoples' Deputy to the MSSR Supreme Soviet in 1990; elected Peoples' Deputy to the 1st and 2nd PMSSR Supreme Soviets.
- V. Emel'ianov: elected chairman of the OSTK on May 19, 1990, at the Third Conference of the OSTK; elected Peoples' Deputy to the PMSSR Supreme Soviet in 1990; chairman of PMSSR VS Commission on the Protection of Law and Order, 1990.
- Alexandru Achimovici Caraman: Ideologue of Slobozia raional committee of Moldovan Communist Party, delegate at the 17th Congress of Moldovan Communist Party. First Assistant to the Chief Doctor of the Slobodzeiskii raion; elected to Slobodzeiskii raisovet in February 1990; elected one of three assistant chairmen of PMSSR Provisionsal Supreme Soviet in September 1990; elected Peoples' Deputy to the PMSSR Supreme Soviet in November 1990; chairman of the House of Nationalities; elected vice-president of the PMR in December 1991; served as vice-president until 2001.
- Andrey Panteleyevich Manoylov: truck driver; co-chair of the United Republican Strike Committee in 1989; elected Peoples' Deputy to the MSSR Supreme Soviet in 1990; elected Peoples' Deputy to the PMSSR Supreme Soviet in 1990; acting Chairman of the Republic of the PSSMR during the imprisonment of Igor Smirnov in 1991.
- Grigore Stepanovici Mărăcuță: first secretary of the Kamenka raion Communist Party committee; elected deputy to the Supreme Soviet of the PMSSR in 1990; chairman of the PMR Supreme Soviet (1991–2005).
- V. M. Ryliakov: shop foreman in the "Elektromash" factory in Tiraspol; co-chair of United Republican Strike Committee, 1989; chairman of the OSTK, 1990; elected Peoples' Deputy to the Tiraspol city soviet, 1990; vice-chairman of the Tiraspol city soviet; elected Peoples' Deputy to the PMSSR Supreme Soviet in 1990.
- B. Shtefan: Chairman of the work collective at the "Elektromash" factory in Tiraspol; elected chair of the OSTK in August 1989; chairman of the United Republican Strike Committee.
- Anna Zakharovna Volkova: Born in Kamtchatka, Russia; historian; member of the editorial board of Bastuiushchii Tiraspol', 1989; elected vice-chairmen of the Provisional PMSSR Supreme Soviet, 1990; vice-chairman of the OSTK, 1990–1991; elected Peoples' Deputy to the Tiraspol city soviet, 1990–95; elected Peoples' Deputy to the MSSR Supreme Soviet, 1990–1992; assistant to the chairman of the PMSSR Supreme Soviet; elected Peoples' Deputy to the PMSSR Supreme Soviet, 1990–95; advisor to the president of the PMR since 1996 and State Advisor to the President since 2002.
- P. A. Zalozhkov: patternmaker (rabochii-modelshchik) at the "Tochlitmash" factory in Tiraspol; vice-chairman of United Strike Committee, 1989; chairman of the Tiraspol City Strike Committee, 1989; elected Peoples' Deputy to the Tiraspol city soviet, 1990; member of the Tiraspol city soviet executive committee.

== Consolidation and collapse ==
Once the PMSSR had been created, the incipient government in Tiraspol fought an increasingly violent struggle for sovereignty with the Moldovan government in Chișinău. In August 1991, many of Gorbachev's advisors participated in a coup d'état attempt to prevent him from signing the New Union Treaty in which Soviet Republics such as Moldova would gain more autonomy under the Union of Soviet Sovereign Republics. The PMSSR supported the failed coup attempt, which Moldova opposed. Throughout late 1991 and into early 1992, workers' battalions, increasingly the beneficiaries of weaponry from sympathetic Red Army officers and defections from among the local military personnel, grew better prepared than the loyalist Moldovan police in Transnistria. Police stations were captured, policemen were evicted, and in extreme cases workers' battalions and police traded fire. Skirmishes in November 1990, and September and December 1991 witnessed continued Moldovan inability to reassert sovereignty in the region. Throughout the first half of 1992 the violence continued to escalate and culminated in a short, but bloody, war in late June 1992. The war left the separatists in Tiraspol with de facto control over most of Transnistria and the west-bank city of Tighina (from now on known as Bender or Bendery).

However, even as the Dniester Republic grew more established as a state, the end of 1991 brought with it the collapse of the state within which the OSTK activists had originally been striving to remain: the Soviet Union.

== See also ==
- South Ossetian Soviet Democratic Republic
- Karakalpakstan (de facto state)
