= Order of Allegiance to the Fatherland =

Order of Allegiance to the Fatherland Ordinul „Credință Patriei”
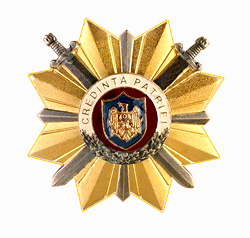

Awarded by the President of Moldova
- Type: Civil order
- Established: 28 July 2004; 22 years ago
- Country: Moldova
- Status: Active

Precedence
- Next (higher): Order of Freedom
- Next (lower): Order of Labour

The Order of Allegiance to the Fatherland (Romanian: Ordinul „Credință Patriei”) is a state award of Moldova, established on July 28, 2004. In February 2024, it was announced that persons decorated with the" order will receive an increased allowance of 300 lei.

== List of recipients ==
- Victor Gaiciuc (2007, 2012)
- Special Forces Brigade "Fulger"
- General Inspectorate of Carabinieri
- Alexandru cel Bun Military Academy
- Ștefan cel Mare 2nd Motorized Infantry Brigade (2017)
- 3rd Motorized Infantry Brigade "Dacia"
