= Ionel Haiduc =

Romanian chemist (1937–2026)

Ionel Haiduc (9 May 1937 – 29 September 2026) was a Romanian chemist who was elected to the Romanian Academy and Academy of Sciences of Moldova. He was the President of the Romanian Academy between 2006 and 2014. Haiduc was more well known for his contributions to Organometallic Chemistry.

Haiduc died on 29 September 2026, at the age of 89.

== Honours ==
=== National honours ===
- (Romania) Romanian Royal Family: Honorary Knight Commander of the Order of the Crown
- (Romania) Romanian Royal Family: Knight of the Royal Decoration of the Cross of the Romanian Royal House
- Romanian Republic: Grand Cross of the Order of the Star of Romania

=== Foreign honours ===
- Moldova: Grand Cross of the Order of Honour
