= Valeriu Rudic =

Moldovan microbiologist (born 1947)

Valeriu Rudic (born 18 February 1947) is a Moldovan microbiologist, chemist, biochemist, and pharmacist. He is a titular member of the Academy of Sciences of Moldova and has made significant contributions to scientific research and the development of new biotechnological products.

== Education and academic career ==
Rudic was born on 18 February 1947 in the Moldovan village Talmaza. He graduated from his high school with gold medal honors and attended the Nicolae Testemițanu State University of Medicine and Pharmacy in Chișinău, where he earned his PhD medical degree with distinction, completing his doctorate in medical science in 1974.

Rudic began his scientific career as a researcher at the Institute of Hygiene and Epidemiology, later becoming a lecturer and then a professor of genetics at the Moldova State University. Over his career, he has held many academic positions, including the Director of the Institute of Microbiology and Biotechnology of the Academy of Sciences of Moldova and the Head of the Department of Microbiology, Virology, and Immunology at the Nicolae Testemițanu State University of Medicine and Pharmacy. He has also undertaken scientific internships, most notably at the University of California, Berkeley between 1982–1983.

== Scientific contributions ==
=== Major innovations and products ===
Rudic's work has led to the development of biotechnological products, with the notable of them being a biological preparation named BioR, a biologically active substance derived from the cyanobacterium Spirulina platensis, which is used in various pharmaceutical products due to its antioxidant and therapeutic properties. The request to register BioR as a trademark was met with objection by French company Dior who claimed that BioR is very similar to their Parfums Christian Dior line, which would cause confusion among customers. Rudic's products also include Levobior ointment and Angenol gel for oral and maxillofacial conditions and Imunobior and Aterobior, which are nutritional supplements with antioxidant and metabolic regulatory effects.

=== Research ===
Rudic published over 1,270 scientific works, including seven monographs and 16 textbooks. He also registered around 300 patents in Moldova, Russia, and Romania. Furthermore he founded a scientific school in phycobiotechnology, through which he has mentored over 43 doctoral theses, including 9 habilitation doctorates.

== Awards and recognition ==
Rudic is the recipient of many national and international awards, medals, and honorary titles, including the Order of Honour and the Order of Work Glory in Moldova, as well as being a titular member of the Academy of Sciences of Moldova. He was also awarded over 200 gold medals at international innovation and technology exhibitions, awards from Eureka, INPEX, and Palexpo, as well as prizes from the World Intellectual Property Organization and other various international bodies.
