= 1989–1990 Transnistrian referendum =

A referendum on the formation of the Pridnestrovian Moldavian Soviet Socialist Republic was held in Transnistria between 1989 and 1990. The first voting took place in Rîbnița on 3 December 1989. In Tiraspol voting was held on 28 January. After the June congress of the local Soviet, voting was held in the districts of Bender, Dubăsari, Sloboza, Camenca and Grigoriopol. The overall total showed 98% voting in favour. The Pridnestrovian Moldavian Soviet Socialist Republic was declared at the second meeting of the Soviet on 2 September 1990.

== Results ==
Choice	Votes	%
For	355,345	97.53
Against	8,998	2.47
Total	364,343	100.00
Valid votes	364,343	98.20
Invalid/blank votes	6,674	1.80
Total votes	371,017	100.00
Registered voters/turnout	471,807	78.64
Source: Novosti PMR
