= Order of Bogdan the Founder =

Order of Bogdan the Founder Ordinul „Bogdan Întemeietorul”
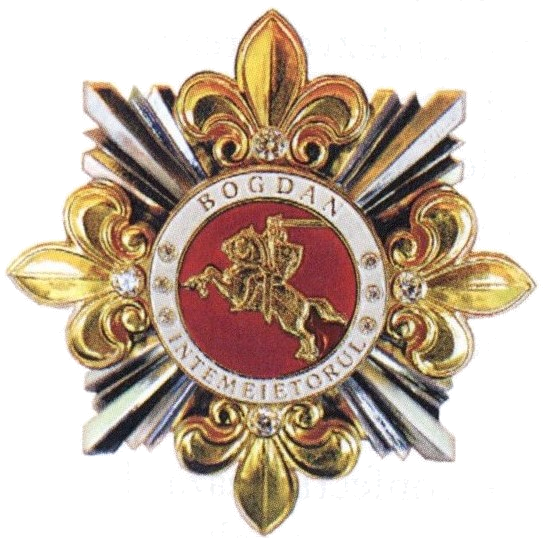

Awarded by the President of Moldova
- Type: Civil order
- Established: 26 December 2008; 17 years ago
- Country: Moldova
- Ribbon
- Status: Active

Precedence
- Next (higher): Order of the Stephen the Great
- Next (lower): Order of Honour

The Order of Bogdan the Founder (Romanian: Ordinul „Bogdan Întemeietorul”) is a state award of Moldova, established on December 26, 2008. It is named after Bogdan the Founder, who was the first independent ruler, or voivode, of Moldavia in the 1360s.

== List of recipients ==
=== Individual ===
- Ion Druță (8 September 2009 года)
- Vladimir Cantarean (10 June 2011)
- Gheorghe Tabunșcic (23 August 2019)
- Eva Gudumac (30 January 2017)

=== Institutional ===
- General Staff of the Moldovan National Army (27 April 2022)
