= Dirk Schuebel =

German diplomat

Dirk Schübel
- Born: 1965 (age 60–61); German Democratic Republic
- Education: Economist
- Occupation: Diplomat
- Known for: Head Delegation of the European Union to Belarus
- Children: Emilia Schübel

Dirk Steffen Schübel (born 1965) is a diplomat and economist from Germany. He serves in the European External Action Service (EEAS) as the Head of the Delegation of the European Union to Belarus since 2019. Previously he has been the Head of the Delegation of the European Union to Moldova from November 2009 until mid 2013.

== Biography ==
Dirk Schübel was born in East Germany. From Brussels he worked with Hungary (helped to bring it into the European Union as political desk officer for Hungary). Dirk Schübel has served as Head of Political, Press and Information Section and Acting Head of the Delegation of the European Commission to Ukraine.

Ambassador Dirk Schübel was the second head of the Delegation of the European Union to Moldova after Cesare de Montis Schübel has been the Head of the Delegation of the European Union to Moldova from November 2009 til mid 2013. He then moved on to work in the EEAS Head Office. Since late summer 2019 he is the Head of the Delegation of the European Union to Belarus.
