= Cesare de Montis =

Member of the delegation of the European Union to Moldova

- Occupation: Diplomat
- Known for: Head Delegation of the European Union to Moldova
- Awards: Honour Order

Cesare de Montis is an official of the European Union. He was the Head of the Delegation of the European Union to Moldova (October 2005 – November 2009).

== Biography ==
In October 2005, Cesare de Montis became the first Head of the Delegation of the European Union to Moldova; in November 2009, he was replaced by Dirk Schuebel

== Awards ==
The interim President of Moldova, Mihai Ghimpu, awarded the Honour Order to Cesare de Montis in October 2009 at the end of his mandate in Moldova.
