= Rudić =

Rudić is a Serbo-Croatian surname, derived from rud(o), meaning "ore". Notable people with the surname include:

- Ratko Rudić (born 1948), Croatian water polo coach and a former Yugoslav water polo player.
- Marko Rudić (born 1990), Bosnian alpine skier.
- Teodora Rudić (born 1998), Serbian female water polo player.
- Ivo Rudić (1942–2009), Croatian-Australian footballer.
- Boglarka Rudić (born 1991), Serbian female water polo player.
- Vladan Rudić (born 1988), Montenegrin volleyballer.

== See also ==
- Rudic (surname)
