= Special Forces Brigade "Fulger" =

- Active: 1991
- Country: Moldavian SSR; Moldova
- Part of: General Police Inspectorate
- Nickname(s): BPDS
- Engagements: Transnistria War; Battle of Bender
- Battle honours

Commanders
- Current commander: Ion Bucliș

The Special Forces Police Brigade "Fulger" (Romanian: Brigada de poliție cu destinație specială (BPDS) «Fulger») is a specialized police unit of the General Police Inspectorate.

It is considered to be one of the most combat-ready units in Moldova. It is based in Chișinău. It is heavily involved in the fight against crime and terrorism as well as hostage rescue missions.

== History ==
It was created by decree of the Government of Moldova on the basis of the Chișinău OPON of the Moldavian Soviet Socialist Republic on 5 December 1991. From 1991 to 1992, the unit took an active part in the Transnistrian conflict, for which it was awarded a battle banner in 1992.

== Awards ==
- Order of Ștefan cel Mare (awarded on 5 December 2011)
