= Order of Stephen the Great =

Order of the Stephen the Great Ordinul „Ștefan cel Mare”
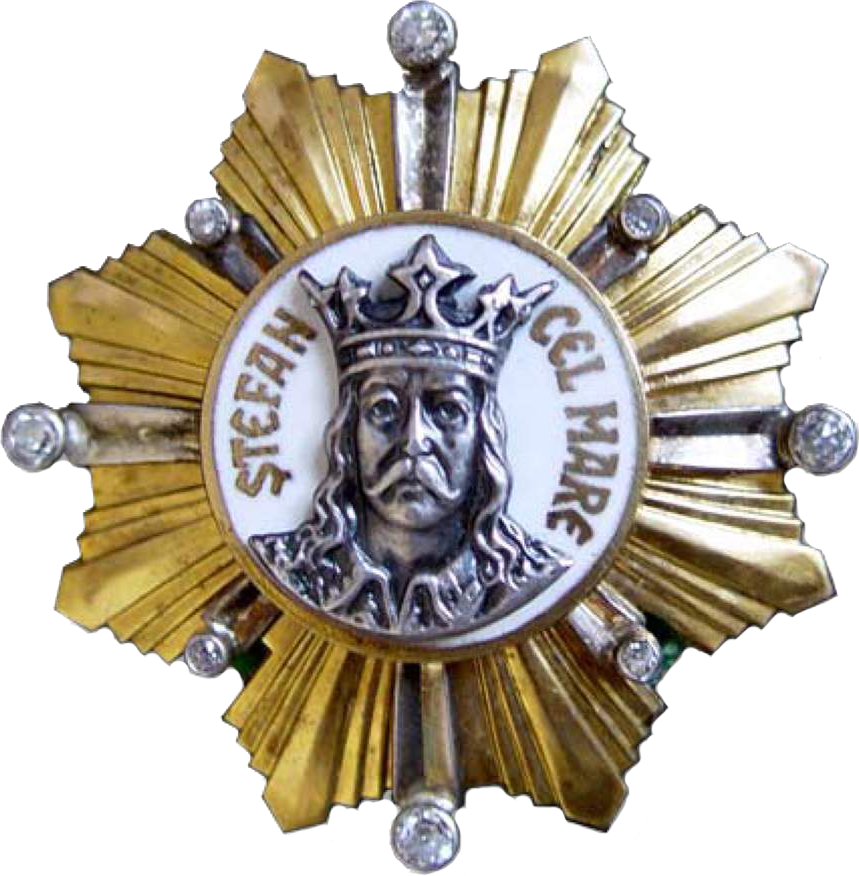

Awarded by the President of Moldova
- Type: Civil order
- Established: 30 July 1992; 33 years ago
- Country: Moldova
- Ribbon
- Status: Active

Precedence
- Next (higher): Order of the Republic
- Next (lower): Order of Bogdan the Founder

The Order of Stephen the Great (Romanian: Ordinul „Ștefan cel Mare”) is a state award of Moldova, established on 30 June 1992. It is the highest military order of the nation. It is named after Stephen III of Moldavia, who was the Voivode of Moldavia from 1457 and 1504.

== List of recipients ==
=== Individual ===
- Traian Băsescu (2015)
- Vasilii Calmoi, retired brigadier general, first Commander of the Border Guard Troops (2020)

=== Institutional ===
- Special Forces Brigade "Fulger" (5 December 2011)
- Ștefan cel Mare Police Academy (5 March 2012)
- National Anticorruption Center (6 June 2017)
- State Protection and Guard Service of Moldova (24 January 2019)
- Police Directorate of the Chisinau Municipality of the General Police Inspectorate (2017)
