= Moldovan Police =

General Inspectorate of Police Inspectoratul General al Poliției
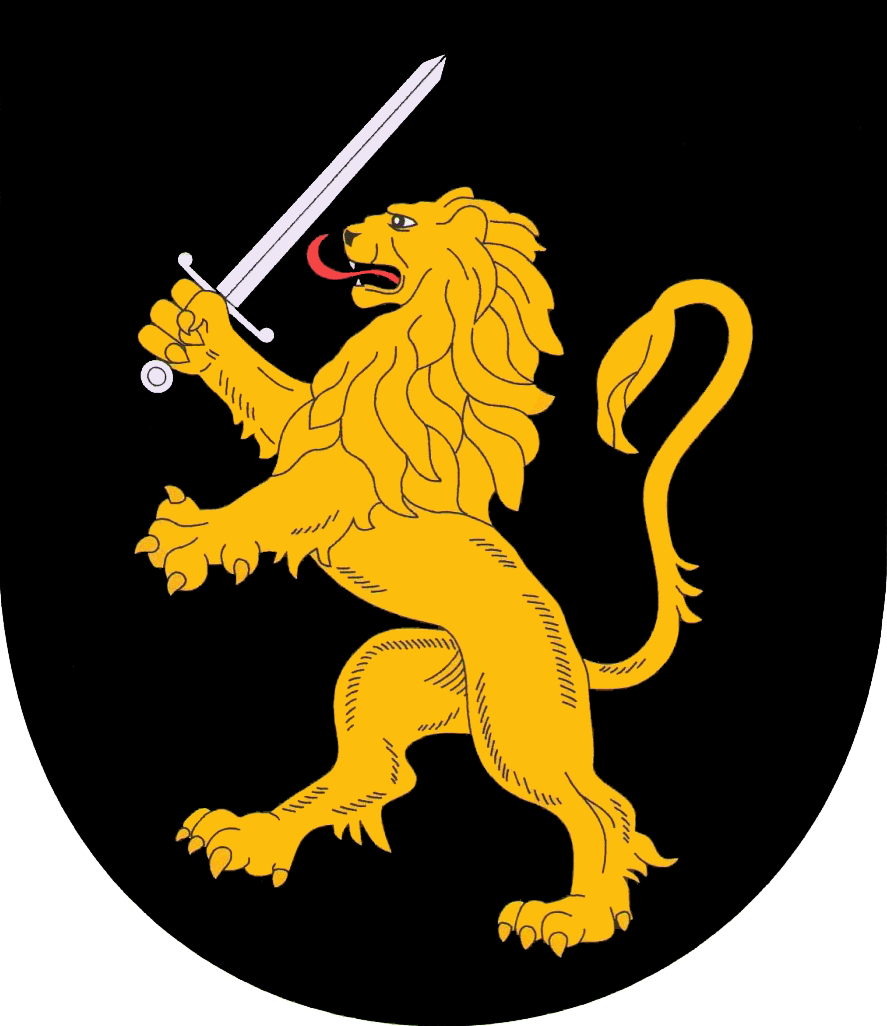

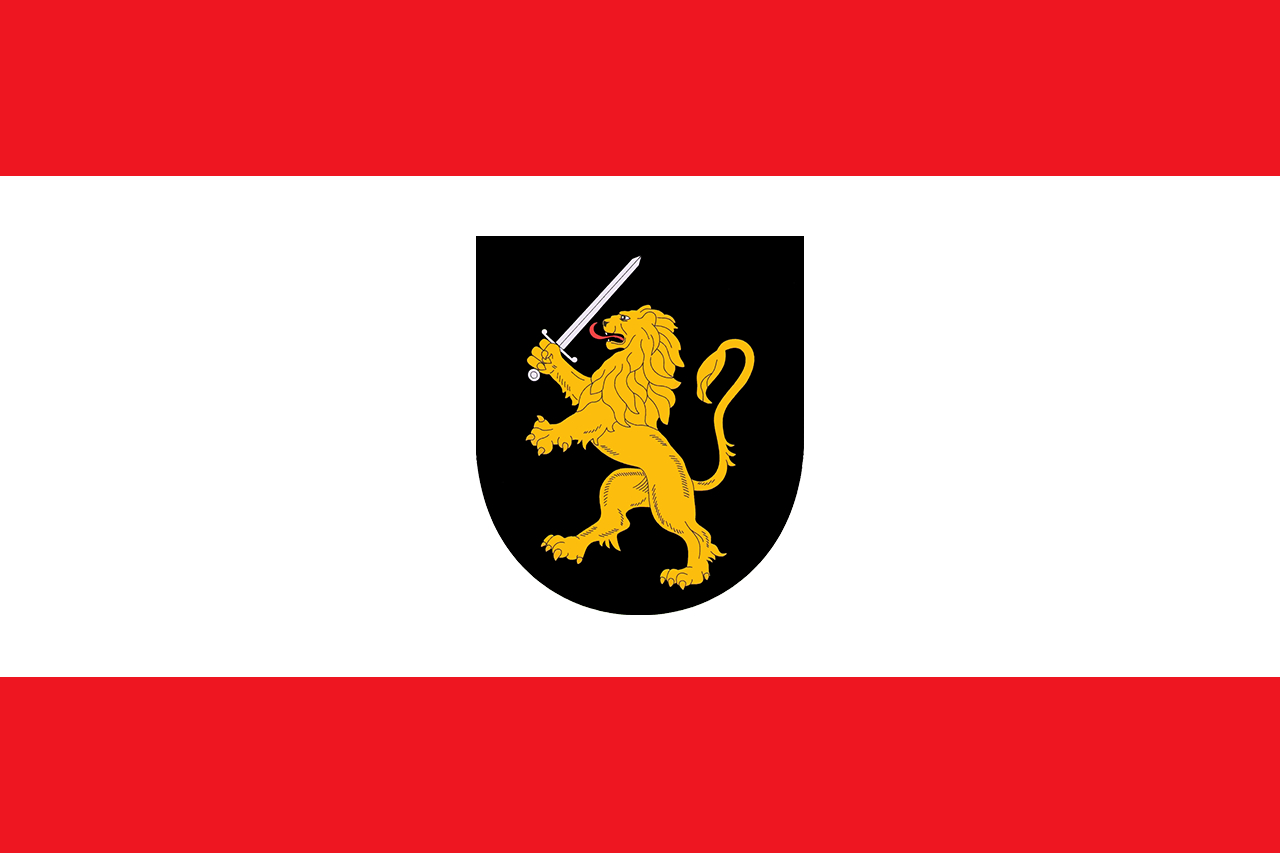
- Common name: Poliția
- Abbreviation: IGP

Agency overview
- Formed: 13 September 1990
- Preceding agency: Militsiya
- Employees: 9,920 (2014)

Jurisdictional structure
- National agency: MDA
- Operations jurisdiction: MDA
- General nature: Civilian police

Operational structure
- Headquarters: MD-2001, mun. Chișinău, str. Tiraspol, nr. 11/1
- Agency executive: Viorel Cernăuțeanu, Chief of the General Police Inspectorate
- Parent agency: Ministry of Internal Affairs

Website
- www.igp.gov.md/ro

The General Inspectorate of Police (Romanian: Inspectoratul General al Poliției, IGP) is the national civilian police force of the Republic of Moldova. It is a state institution subordinated to the Ministry of Internal Affairs, that regulates law enforcement in Moldova. The current Chief of the General Police Inspectorate is currently Viorel Cernăuțeanu.

== History ==
The GPI was established as the Police of the Republic of Moldova on 13 September 1990, after the Government of Moldova adopted resolution no. 321 "On the reform of the bodies of the Ministry of Internal Affairs of the Moldovan SSR", which provided for the creation of the police and district police stations. Thus, the place of the Soviet-era militia was occupied by the new police.

On 18 December 1990, the Parliament of Moldova adopted the Law on police. In 1995 the national police of Moldova were under the direction of the Ministry of Interior. Internal troops were reported to have 2,500 men, and the numbers of riot police were put at 900. The scope and quality of Moldova's state security apparatus were difficult to determine. Like the armed forces, local assets of the former Moldavian KGB were transferred to the new government along with those personnel who wished to enter the service of the new government. These elements functioned at the time under the republic's Ministry of National Security before being transferred to the MAI.

On 27 December 2012, a law which entered into force on 5 March 2013 established the General Police Inspectorate under the MIA. On 24 April 2013, the new police uniform was approved. On 8 April 2014, the Strategic Development Program was approved, a basic document of the Police, elaborated for a period of 3 years, which ensures the prioritization of the various objectives for the IGP.

== Organization ==
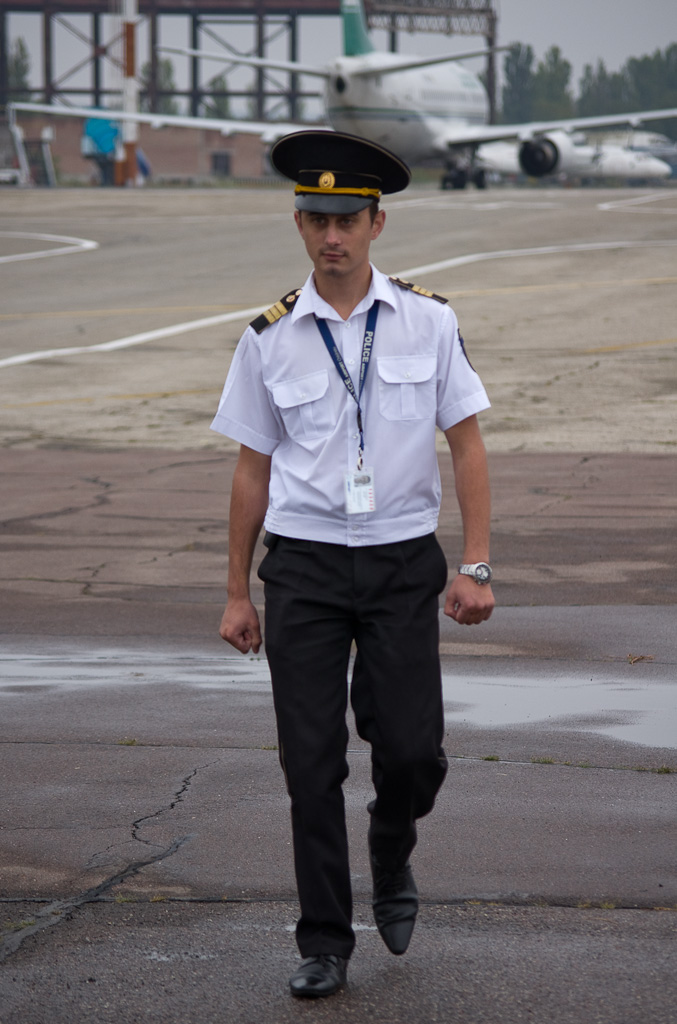
A Moldovan policeman

As a law enforcement body of state power, the police of the Republic of Moldova are divided into state and municipal. State police perform their duties throughout the republic, municipal - in the territory of the corresponding administrative unit. State and municipal police carry out their tasks in close cooperation. The State Police provides the municipal police with methodological and advisory assistance, as well as assists in the implementation of the duties assigned to it by their own forces and means. The municipal police assist the state police in carrying out operational investigative measures, timely inform them of the persons and facts of interest to them.

Institutions under the GPI are:

- National Inspectorate of Investigations
- National Inspectorate for Public Security
- Police Department of Chisinau Municipality
- General Directorate of Criminal Investigation
- Special Forces Brigade "Fulger"
- Chinologic Center
- Technical-Forensic Center and Judicial Expertise
- Center for International Police Cooperation (Interpol)
- Judicial Police
- Procurement and Logistics Service
- Directorate of Inspection
- 42 police inspectorates at district level

== Recognition ==
On the inspectorate's 30th anniversary in 2017, the Police Directorate of the Chisinau Municipality was awarded by President Igor Dodon the Order of Ștefan cel Mare.

=== Uniform ===
The IGP has a summer outfit, a spring-autumn outfit and a winter outfit. The parade dress is worn during the participation in the festivities (taking the oath, awarding of ministerial and departmental distinctions, march pasts, national holidays, and official receptions).

== Controversial issues ==
=== Public perception ===
The common lack of respect towards law, in general, among Moldovans results in a predominant distrust for police. This is not helped by the fact that police incompetency due to various reasons is frequent.

=== Ill-treatment by police ===
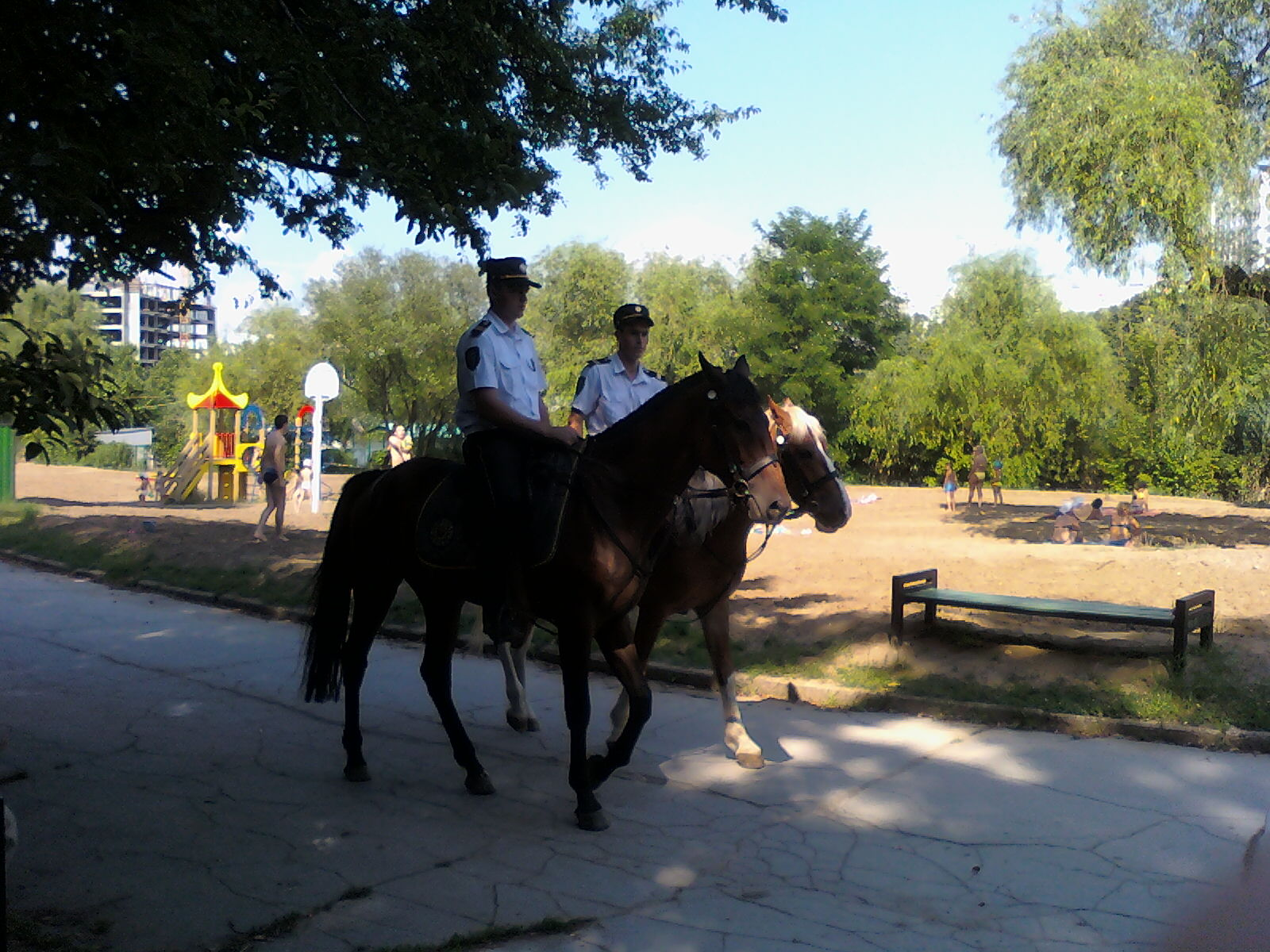
Mounted Moldovan police in a park.

Moldova is not a part of the EU, but as of 2024, it started negotiations after it applied for membership in 2022. According to Amnesty International in October 2007, torture and ill-treatment in Moldova remain widespread and systemic despite some initial legislative steps made by the government to change police practices in order to eradicate it. "Although efforts have been made to bring legislation into line with international and European standards, practice and attitudes are lagging behind. Beatings and abuse of detainees remain the norm. Channels for seeking redress stay blocked. Lack of transparency breeds impunity," Amnesty Internationals researcher said. The events during the April 2009 Moldova civil unrest have drawn criticism of human rights violations, including in regard to the deaths of Valeriu Boboc, Ion Ţâbuleac, and Eugen Ţapu.

== See also ==
Law Enforcement in Moldova

- Trupele de Carabinieri
- Moldovan Border Police
- Crime in Moldova
