= Order of Freedom (Moldova) =

Order of Freedom Ordinul Libertății
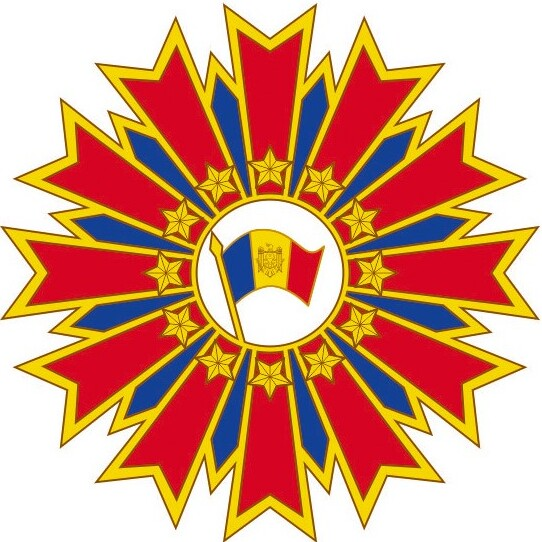

Awarded by the President of Moldova
- Type: Civil order
- Established: 14 August 2025; 11 months ago
- Country: Moldova
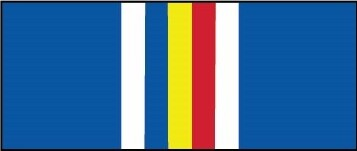
- Ribbon
- Status: Active

Precedence
- Next (higher): Order of Honour
- Next (lower): Order of Allegiance to the Fatherland

The Order of Freedom (Romanian: Ordinul Libertății) is a state award of Moldova, established on 14 August 2025. It is 5 out 7 in the Moldovan honours system.

== Description ==
On 10 July 2025, the parliament of Moldova voted for the establishment of the Order of Freedom, an initiative was backed by 62 MPs. It was signed into law on 14 August by President Maia Sandu. According to Moldovan law, the Order of Freedom is awarded solely on August 27, Independence Day.

The Order of Freedom is conferred for:

- Promoting democracy, human rights, equal rights, freedom, pluralism and tolerance
- Protecting and promoting the cultural heritage, tangible and intangible, of the nation and of national minorities
- Supporting charity actions, promoting inclusion and assuming social commitment
