= Russia–Transnistria relations =

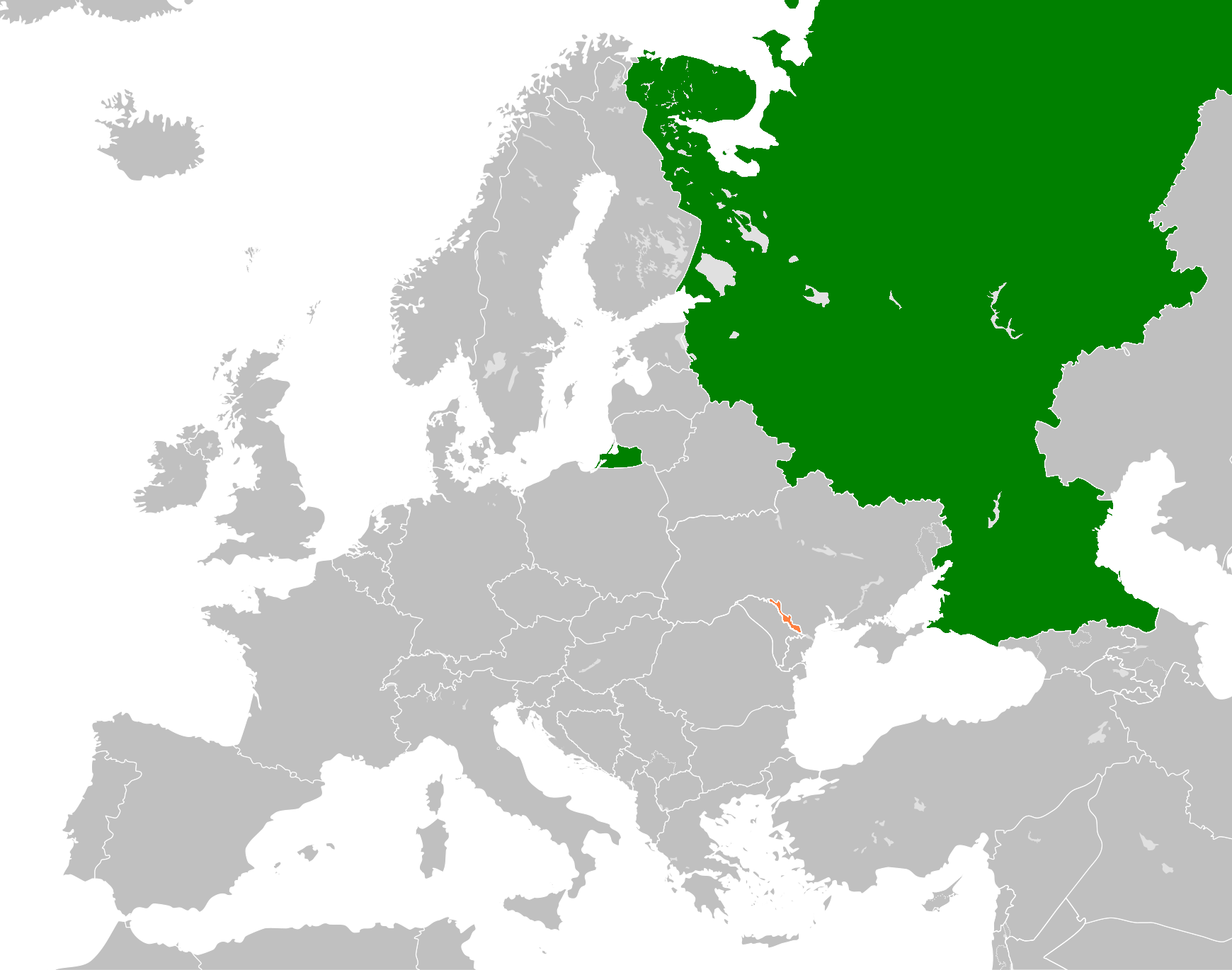

- Russia: Transnistria

Russia–Transnistria relations are the bilateral relations between the Pridnestrovian Moldavian Republic (Transnistria), an unrecognised breakaway state that is internationally recognised as part of Moldova, and the Russian Federation. Russia does not officially recognise the independence of Transnistria; nevertheless, Russia maintains special relations with Transnistria in the political, military, cultural, and economic spheres.

== History ==
The state of Transnistria was created by local economic elites with special relations to the Soviet and later Russian political centre.

During the reign of Igor Smirnov (1991–2011) maintaining special relations with Russia was a priority of Transnistrian foreign policy. In the 2006 Transnistrian independence referendum, 98.07% of Transnistrians voted for independence and potential future integration into Russia.

Russia is a member of the 5+2 format for negotiating a settlement of the Transnistria conflict established during Smirnov's rule. At the end of his tenure however, Russia pushed for a change at the helm of the state in the 2011 Transnistrian presidential election.

During a visit to Kyiv in 2010, President Dmitri Medvedev said he supported a "special status" for Transnistria and recognised the "important and stabilising" role of the Russian army. In the early 2010s, experts estimated that Russia is aiming for a so-called "Taiwanisation" of Transnistria.

In 2021, the Transnistrian foreign minister Vitaly Ignatiev visited Russia and met with a Russian Ambassador-at-Large. During their conversation, the two representatives discussed various fields of Russian-Transnistrian relations, including the COVID-19 pandemic in Transnistria.

On 22 April 2022, following the Russian invasion of Ukraine, the Russian major general Rustam Minnekayev said that one of the objectives of the invasion was to establish a land corridor with occupied Transnistria, claiming that there was "evidence that the Russian-speaking population is being oppressed" in the region without giving further detail on the issue.

In February 2024, Transnistria officials asked Russia for "protection" while accusing Moldova of blocking imports in an "economic war" and turning the region into a "ghetto".

== Consular relations ==
In 2012, Russia opened a consulate in Transnistria, despite protests from the government of Moldova. Nevertheless, Russia has not recognized Transnistria as an independent state.

In 2017, Transnistria opened a provisional bureau in Moscow. Alexandru Caraman, former vice-president of Transnistria (1990–2001) and former foreign minister of the Donetsk People's Republic (2014), led the bureau, which was shortly thereafter closed. Two years later, an official diplomatic bureau of Transnistria was opened in Moscow. Later that year, the Transnistrian government asked Russian authorities if they could issue passports and other documents in the diplomatic bureau. The bureau is located in Povarskaya Street and currently led by Leonid Manakov, the Vice President of the Lawyer’s Union of the Russian Federation.

== See also ==
- Foreign relations of Russia
- Foreign relations of Transnistria
- Moldova–Russia relations
- Moldova–Transnistria relations
- Transnistria conflict
- Proposed Russian annexation of Transnistria
- Transnistria–United States relations
