= Transnistria–United States relations =

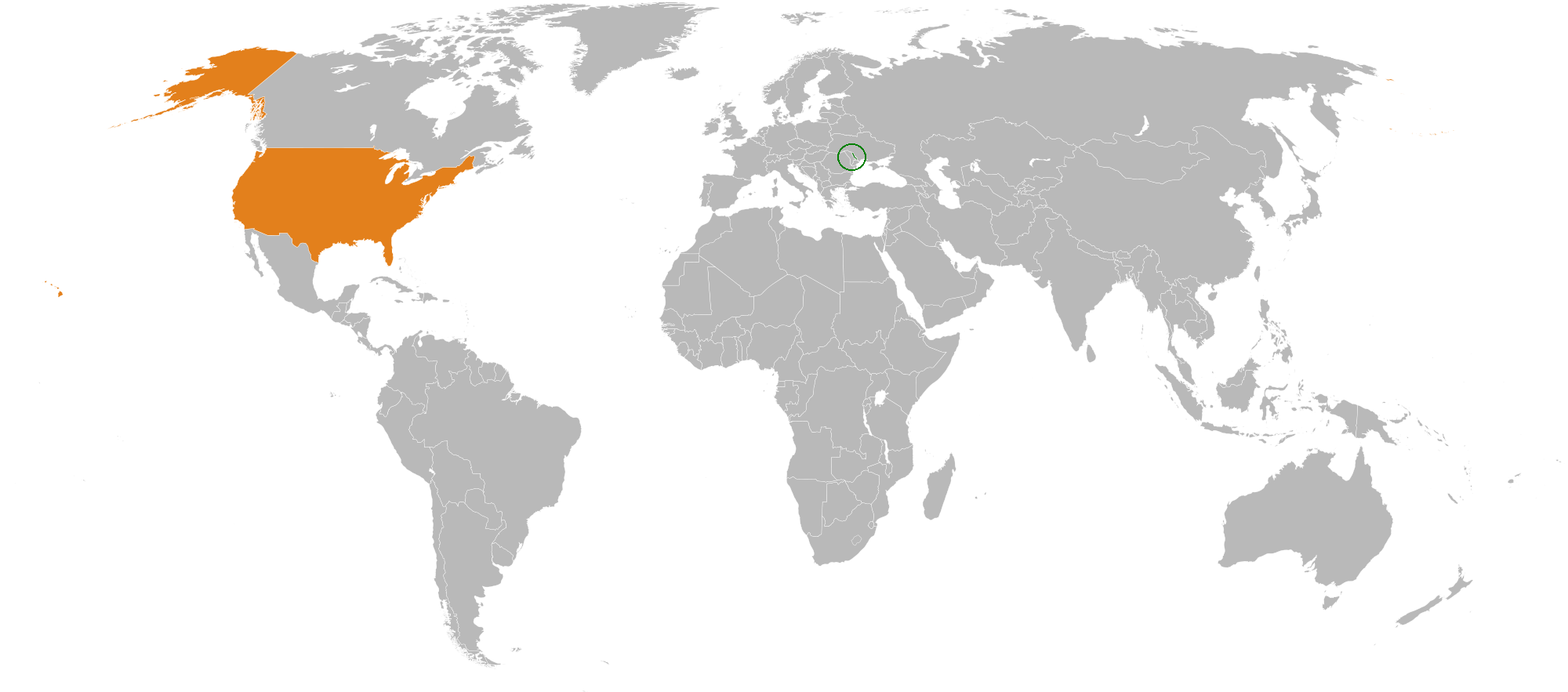

- Transnistria: United States

Transnistria and the United States do not have official diplomatic relations as the United States is among the vast majority of countries that does not recognize Transnistria as a sovereign nation and instead recognize the region of Transnistria as part of Moldova.

== History ==
The United States' formal position regarding Transnistria is that it advocates a peaceful resolution, referring to the Transnistria conflict as a "separatist conflict". It also states that the United States "supports the territorial integrity of Moldova and views as important the democratic and economic development of Moldovan governance", and "we support a credible and sustainable negotiated solution to the conflict. This will contribute to Moldova's democratic and economic development as well as to the security of the Black Sea region" and that "we encourage the sides, with the help of the international community, to strengthen their efforts to find a sustainable and peaceful resolution to the conflict".

The United States is an observer of the 5+2 format for negotiating a solution to the Transnistria conflict. This platform is composed by Moldova, Transnistria, Russia, Ukraine, the Organization for Security and Co-operation in Europe (OSCE) and the United States and the European Union (EU) as observers.

On 3 March 2006, Ukraine introduced new customs regulations on its border with Transnistria. Ukraine declared that it would only import goods from Transnistria with documents processed by Moldovan customs offices as part of the implementation of the joint customs protocol agreed between Ukraine and Moldova on 30 December 2005, provoking a crisis in Transnistria. The latter and Russia termed the act an "economic blockade". The United States, the EU, and the OSCE approved the Ukrainian move, while Russia saw it as a means of political pressure. On 4 March, Transnistria responded by blocking the Moldovan and Ukrainian transport at the borders of Transnistria. The Transnistrian block was lifted after two weeks. However, the Moldovan–Ukrainian block remains in place and is an important topic discussed on settlement talks.

In 2021, Dereck J. Hogan, the United States Ambassador to Moldova, declared that the resolution of the Transnistria conflict was important to the United States and that Transnistria should be under the authority of Moldova. He also expressed his support for the reintegration of Transnistria into Moldova and said that a victory for Maia Sandu in the 2021 Moldovan parliamentary election in which a parliamentary majority was obtained would be an important step in solving the conflict.

== See also ==
- Foreign relations of Transnistria
- Foreign relations of the United States
- Moldova–Russia relations
- Moldova–Transnistria relations
- Moldova–United States relations
- Russia–Transnistria relations
- Russia–United States relations
