= Yushchenko Plan =

2005 plan to end the Transnistria conflict

Ukrainian plan for settling the Transnistrian conflict
- Drafted: 2005
- Signed: N/A
- Location: N/A
- Mediators: Russia; Ukraine; Organization for Security and Co-operation in Europe; European Union; United States
- Signatories: (never signed, proposed): Moldova; Transnistria; Russia; Ukraine; Organization for Security and Co-operation in Europe; European Union; United States

The Yushchenko Plan, also referred to as the Ukrainian Plan, was an unsuccessful 2005 plan developed by then-President of Ukraine Viktor Yushchenko and Secretary of the National Security and Defense Council Petro Poroshenko in an effort to bring an end to the Transnistria conflict by peaceful means with the support of Moldova and the Organization for Security and Co-operation in Europe (OSCE).

== Background ==
The Transnistria conflict began prior to the independence of Moldova, with the primarily-Slavic (Note: 29.1% Russian and 22.9% Ukrainian, compared to 28.6% Moldovan, as of the 2015 Transnistrian census.) region of Transnistria declaring its sovereignty from the mostly-Romanian Moldova. This led to the Transnistria War in 1992, in which Transnistria, supported by Russia, successfully secured de facto independence from Moldova as part of a ceasefire agreement.

Prior to the Yushchenko Plan, multiple unsuccessful attempts attempted to solve the Transnistria conflict. These efforts became particularly notable following the 2001 election of Vladimir Voronin as President of Moldova, with a renewed effort made by the Moldovan government to reach a settlement as part of Voronin's promise to solve the Transnistria conflict within his first term. Key to Voronin's plans, which had backing from the Organization for Security and Co-operation in Europe (OSCE), Ukraine, and Russia, was the federalization of Moldova with the inclusion of Transnistria. This proposal was opposed by the Moldovan opposition, while the 2003 Russian-developed Kozak memorandum, which would have granted strong powers to Transnistrian authorities within a Moldovan federation, caused backlash in Moldova and Western diplomatic circles. Relations between Moldova and Transnistria further worsened after the latter closed all Romanian-language schools on its territory the next year, leading to Voronin to declare a halt to negotiations.

Following the 2005 Moldovan parliamentary election, the Party of Communists of the Republic of Moldova (PCRM) was re-elected, and Voronin was re-elected as president by the Parliament of Moldova. The new PCRM government was supportive of further integration with the European Union, in contrast with its previous Russophilic position. To Moldova's east, Ukraine also elected a new pro-Western government: the Orange Revolution following the 2004 Ukrainian presidential election had brought the government of Viktor Yushchenko into power. Now surrounded by pro-European governments, the government of Transnistria found the problem of its international isolation and fragility even more pressing than in previous years, particularly as the possibility of the Transnistria–Ukraine border (Transnistria's only open border) closing became clear. Under these circumstances, the Yushchenko Plan was developed by Ukraine.

== Plan and initial support ==
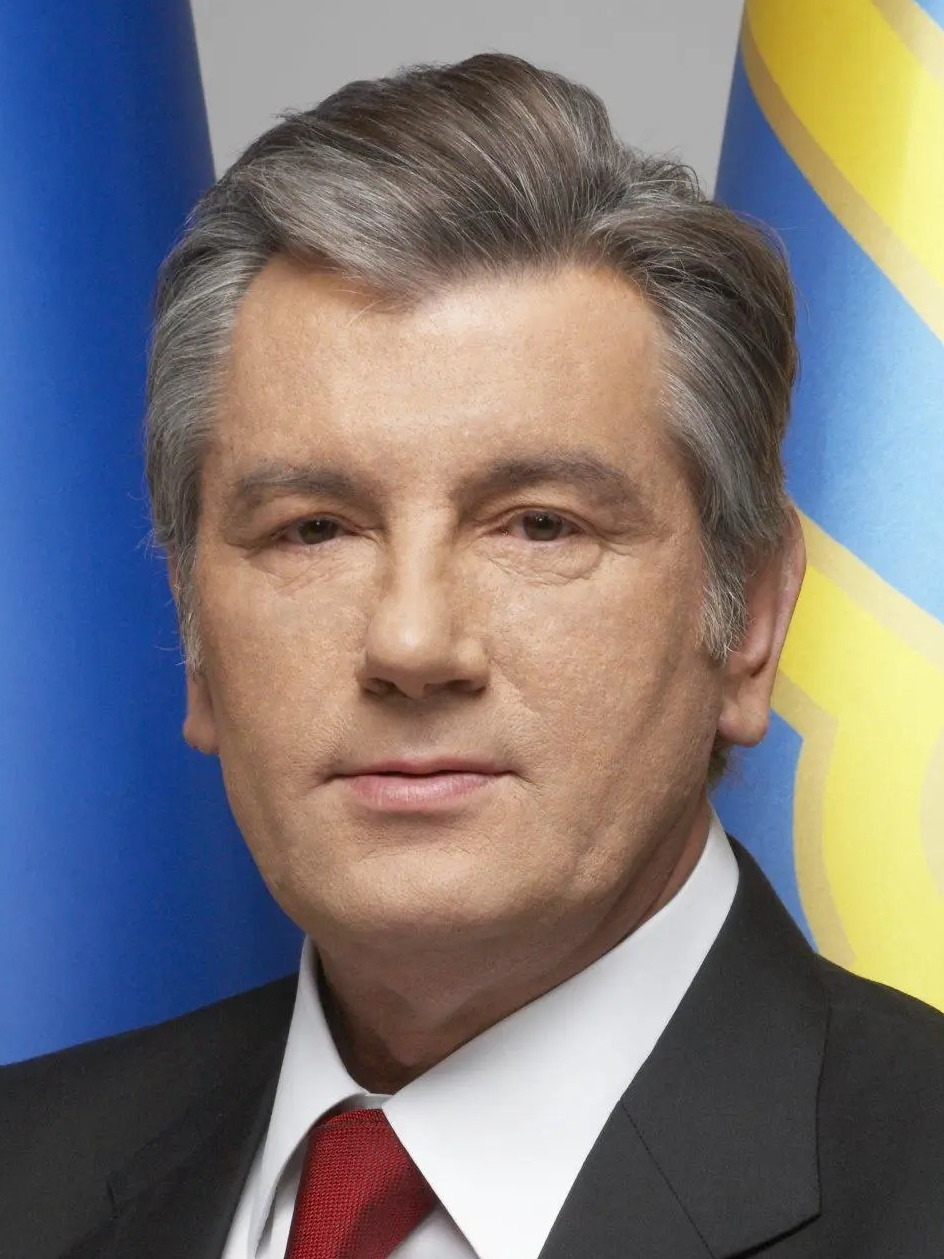
Viktor Yushchenko, President of Ukraine

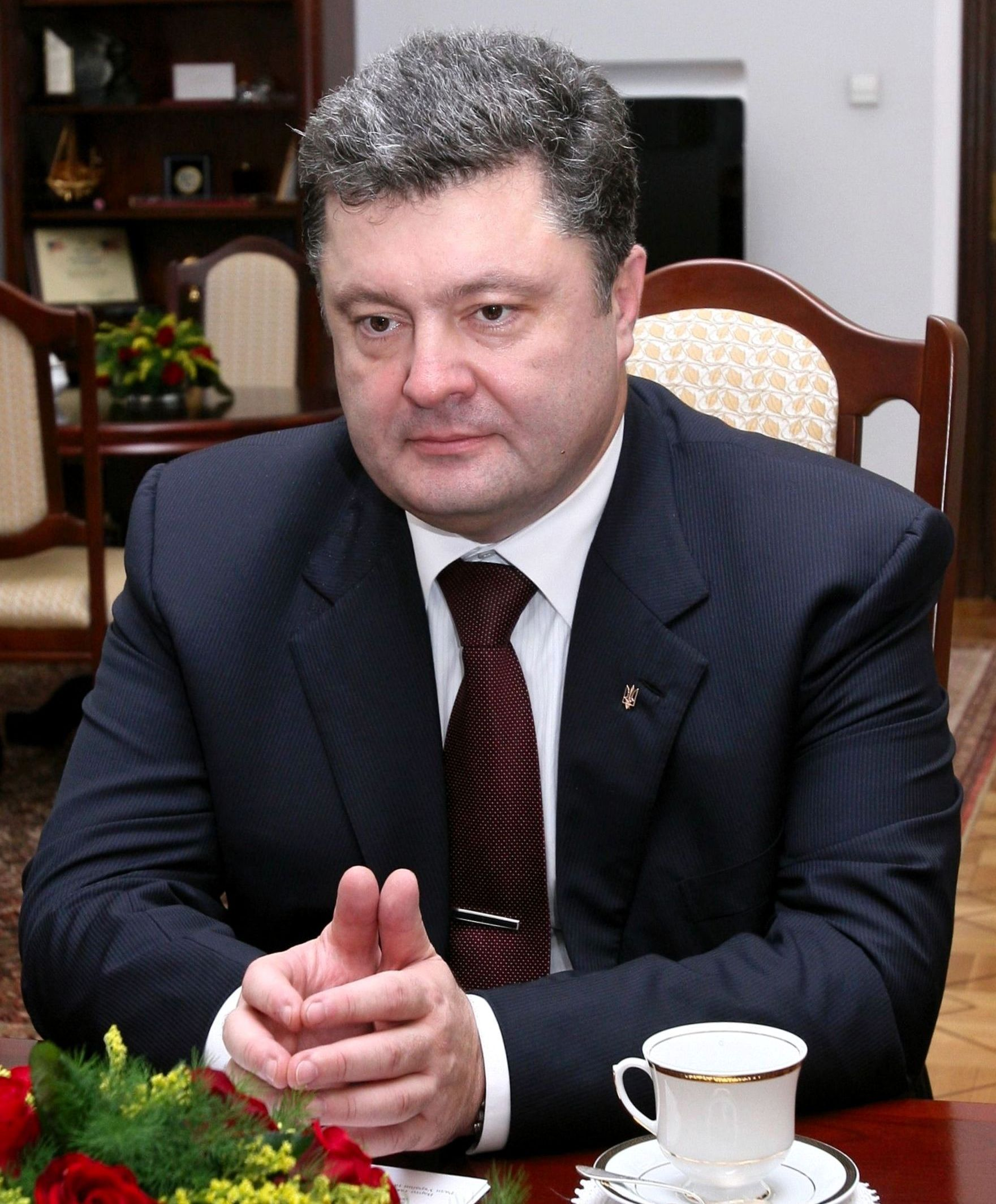
Petro Poroshenko, Secretary of the National Security and Defense Council

With Transnistria increasingly isolated, Yushchenko's government began the drafting of a plan to solve the Transnistria conflict. Petro Poroshenko, Secretary of the National Security and Defense Council of Ukraine, played a leading role in the creation of the plan, and revealed it at the 22 April 2005 GUUAM summit. The plan included seven points:

1. "Ukraine proposes to the Administration of Transnistria to create conditions for development of democracy, civil society, and a multiparty system."
2. "Elections to be held soon to Transnistria's Supreme Soviet, the representative body of the Transnistria region of Moldova, on the basis of a legal status of Transnistria."
3. "The European Union, OSCE, Council of Europe, Russia, the United States to participate alongside Ukraine in monitoring the free and democratic elections to Transnistria's Supreme Soviet."
4. "Ukraine supports the intentions of the European Union and the United States to contribute to the solution of the problem of Transnistria."
5. "The existing peacekeeping format to be transformed into an international mechanism of military and civilian observers under OSCE aegis."
6. "The Administration of Transnistria to allow an international monitoring mission, with the participation of Ukrainian specialists, to military-industrial enterprises in the region."
7. "Ukraine is prepared to consent to short-term monitoring of the Ukraine-Moldova border by OSCE teams from Ukrainian territory, with a view to checking the movement of goods and people. We call on Transnistria to take similar steps."

Three stages for the plan's fulfillment were laid out, each lasting six months at most. First, passing a law in the Moldovan parliament to establish the basic principles of a settlement. This law would also serve as the basis for a new Transnistrian constitution. Second, holding free and fair elections under the guidance and overview of the OSCE, to be followed by the establishment of a commission including both Moldovan and Transnistrian deputies to create a new "Law on the Special Legal Status of Transnistria", also including input from Ukraine, Russia, and the OSCE, as well as potentially the European Union and United States. Third, creating a "Conciliation Committee" to settle disputes arising from the law on Transnistria's status, including Moldovan, Transnistrian, Russian, Ukrainian, and OSCE members, as well as members from the European Union and United States if necessary.

The Yushchenko Plan was met with support from Russia, Moldova, and the OSCE, and became the basis of the 5+2 format of negotiations beginning the same year. Further details were revealed at a meeting in the Ukrainian city of Vinnytsia in May 2005, during which both Transnistrian and Moldovan leadership expressed support for the plan and expressed a will to see it followed through. A draft treaty for the plan was written. On 10 June 2005, the Moldovan parliament approved the Yushchenko Plan with 96 votes in favour, and passed two additional resolutions. The first called for the withdrawal of Russian forces in Transnistria and the establishment of a demilitarised zone across Transnistria. The second urged the assistance of the OSCE, European Union, and United States in democratising Transnistria.

On 22 July 2005, the first stage of the Yushchenko Plan was fulfilled after the Moldovan parliament passed the Law on the Basic Provisions of the Special Legal Status of Settlements on the Left Bank of the Dniester, establishing sweeping autonomy for Transnistria within Moldova, giving the Supreme Soviet of Transnistria official authority, and establishing an international commission under the auspices of the OSCE and Council of Europe to ensure the freedom and fairness of elections, as well as compliance with Moldovan law. The lack of Transnistrian input in the creation of the law, however, as well as a lack of international guarantees, caused concerns that Transnistria would not accept the plan.

== End of the plan ==
Despite early support, however, the plan quickly lost steam. With Transnistria rebuking Moldovan efforts to realize the plan, calling it an "asymmetrical federation," the Moldovan government in late 2005 had signaled unwillingness to continue negotiations. As a result, the United States and European Union were brought into negotiations as observers by Russia and Transnistria. This move, however, only brought further deadlock to negotiations as Moldova found itself on an equal position to Transnistria.

The Yushchenko Plan was dealt a further blow when Moldova and Ukraine reached a border agreement. Transnistria and Russia both strongly condemned the agreement, further exacerbating the 2005–2006 Russia–Ukraine gas dispute and leading to a deterioration in relations. Relations further worsened after the visit of Ukrainian Minister of Foreign Affairs Borys Tarasyuk to Moldova's capital Chișinău in June 2006, in which he called for the inclusion of Romania in the 5+2 negotiation format (a proposal previously rejected by both Russia and Ukraine) and accused Transnistria and Russia of using threats of an economic blockade to prevent further negotiations. In response, anti-Ukrainian and anti-American protests broke out in Transnistria.

Despite the failure of the Yushchenko Plan, the United States continued to express support for it in 2006, and for the replacement of exclusively-Russian forces in Transnistria with an international peacekeeping contingent including Russia. By 2007, however, the plan was fully over, as negotiations remained at a standstill and the 5+2 format lost relevance.
