= Ministry of Foreign Affairs (Transnistria) =

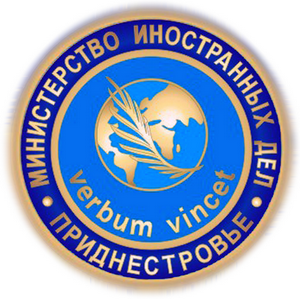
Emblem of the Ministry

This is a list of foreign ministers of Transnistria.

No.	Image	Name	Took office	Left office
1		Valeriy Litskai	2000	2008
2		Vladimir Yastrebchak	2008	2012
3		Nina Shtanski	2012	2015
4		Vitaly Ignatiev	2016 (acting since 2015)	present

== Sources ==
- Rulers.org – Foreign ministers L–R
