= Vladimir Yastrebchak =

Transnistrian politician (1979–2024)

- Владимир Ястребчак
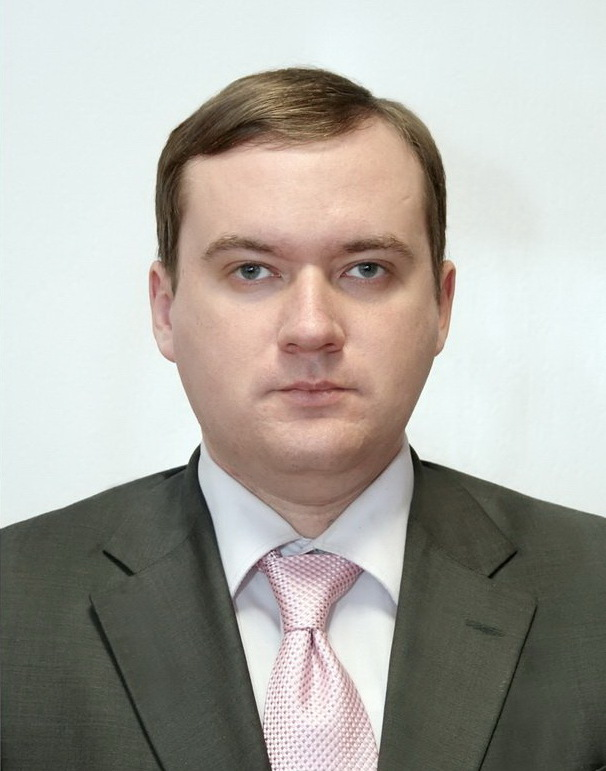
- Official portrait in 2012

Minister of Foreign Affairs
- In office 1 July 2008 – 24 January 2012
- President: Igor Smirnov
- Preceded by: Valeriy Anatolievich Litskai
- Succeeded by: Nina Shtanski

Personal details
- Born: Vladimir Valerevich Yastrebchak; 9 October 1979 Tiraspol, Moldavian SSR, USSR (modern-day Transnistria)
- Died: 11 May 2024 (aged 44)
- Education: T. G. Shevchenko University

Vladimir Valerevich Yastrebchak (Russian: Владимир Валерьевич Ястребчак; 9 October 1979 – 11 May 2024) was a Moldovan Transnistrian politician who served as minister of Foreign Affairs. He succeeded the longtime minister Valeriy Anatolievich Litskai on 1 July 2008. Yastrebchak's tenure ended in January 2012 when Nina Shtanski was appointed the minister of foreign affairs.

== Life and career ==
Yastrebchak was born in Tiraspol on 9 October 1979. He graduated from the law school of the T. G. Shevchenko University in 2001, after which he joined the Ministry of Foreign Affairs. He became the First Deputy Minister there on 14 February 2007.

Yastrebchak spoke a number of languages fluently, including English and French. He was of Ukrainian descent and was married. Yastrebchak died on 11 May 2024, at the age of 44.
