= Berlin Plus package =

Eight points to be implemented in the Transnistria conflict settlement process

The so-called Berlin Plus package (Romanian: Pachetul Berlin Plus; Russian: Пакет Берлин Плюс, romanized: Paket Berlin Plyus) is the name given to a series of eight points that were agreed to be implemented in a protocol signed in 2016 during a meeting of the 5+2 format that took place on that year in Berlin, Germany, to improve the situation of the Transnistria conflict between Moldova and the unrecognized breakaway state of Transnistria. These eight points, which had been under negotiation since 2012, are the following:

- The reopening of the bridge connecting the villages of Gura Bîcului (under Moldovan control) and Bîcioc (under Transnistrian control).
- The apostilization (i.e. the legalization and validation) of diplomas given by Transnistrian universities.
- To ensure the functioning of the Romanian-language schools in Transnistria using the Latin alphabet.
- To allow the entrance of Moldovan farmers to their own farmlands in territory under Transnistrian control.
- To permit the participation of vehicles with Transnistrian registration plates in international traffic.
- Ecology issues concerning the Dniester River.
- The reintegration between Moldovan and Transnistrian telecommunication networks (such as GSM) and landlines.
- To implement law enforcement on criminal cases from both sides, including those against officers, as well as to exchange lists of existing criminal cases; and to allow freedom of movement of people, goods and services between both sides.

The protocol was viewed favorably by international mediators such as Russia and the then governing Democratic Party of Moldova and President of Moldova Igor Dodon. However, the mostly right-wing pro-European opposition parties, including those that supported the unification of Moldova and Romania, had a more skeptical approach, viewing the protocol as insignificant and even as a "surrender" by the Moldovan negotiators.

In 2017, the Organization for Security and Co-operation in Europe (OSCE) claimed that progress on two points of the package had been made. Wolf Dietrich Heim, the then representative of the OSCE on the Moldovan–Transnistrian talks, said that diplomas from Transnistrian universities had been successfully certified and that telecommunication between Moldova and Transnistria had been facilitated. On the same year, the bridge at Gura Bîcului was reopened during an event attended by the then Prime Minister of Moldova Pavel Filip and the then President of Transnistria Vadim Krasnoselsky, as well as several international observers.

In 2018, significant advances were observed, with the Moldovan authorities announcing that six of the eight points had been implemented as of that year. However, the remaining points were put aside by Moldovan politicians due to the start of the electoral campaign of the 2019 Moldovan parliamentary election. Furthermore, a new meeting of the 5+2 format in Bratislava, Slovakia, brought no new concrete changes regarding the Berlin Plus package, with 2019 thus being a year with no major developments. 2020 was more of the same, this being due to the COVID-19 pandemic.

Despite all of this, the Transnistrian authorities have been accused with sabotaging the implemented points of the Berlin Plus package, in particular the situation of the Romanian-language schools of the country and the entry of Moldovan farmers to their lands under Transnistrian rule, with even allegedly using the COVID-19 pandemic to achieve this more efficiently. In fact, in August 2021, the Transnistrian government refused to register the Romanian-language school the Lucian Blaga High School at Tiraspol and forced it to cease its activities for three months, affecting the school year of the students of the school and allegedly constituting a violation of several articles of the Convention on the Rights of the Child as some have said.

== See also ==
- Moldova–Transnistria relations
