= Vitaly Ignatiev =

Transnistrian foreign minister and diplomat

- Виталий Игнатьев
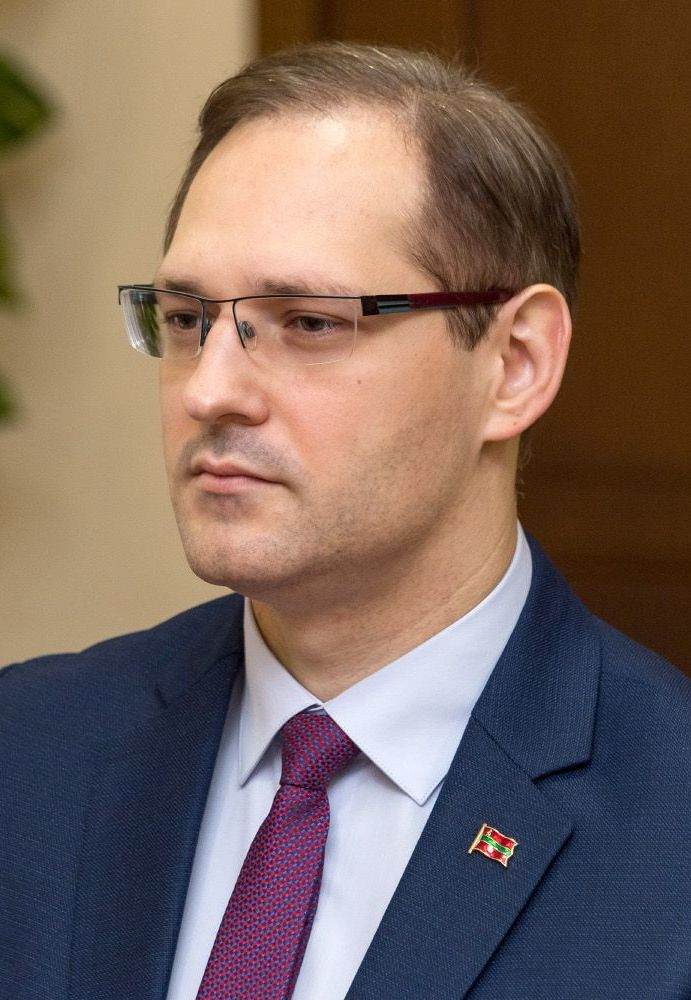
- Ignatiev in 2020

Minister of Foreign Affairs of Transnistria
- Incumbent
- Assumed office 2016
- Preceded by: Nina Shtanski

Personal details
- Born: Vitaly Viktorovich Ignatiev; 5 July 1980 (age 46) Kotovsk, Ukrainian SSR, Soviet Union (now Podilsk, in Ukraine)
- Citizenship: Russia; Ukraine
- Education: Shevchenko Transnistria State University; National University Odesa Law Academy
- Occupation: Politician

Vitaly Viktorovich Ignatiev (Russian: Виталий Викторович Игнатьев; Romanian: Vitali (Note: Also Vitalii or Vitalie.) Victorovici Ignatiev; Ukrainian: Віталій Вікторович Ігнатьєв; born 5 July 1980) is the Minister of Foreign Affairs of Transnistria, an unrecognized breakaway region of Moldova. Ignatiev is currently Transnistria's main negotiator for the solution of the Transnistria conflict. A Ukrainian citizen, he is a suspect of treason in Ukraine.

== Biography ==
Vitaly Viktorovich Ignatiev was born on 5 July 1980 in Kotovsk, in the Ukrainian SSR of the Soviet Union (now Podilsk, in Ukraine; Romanian: Bârzula or Bârzu). Two years later, he and his family moved to Rîbnița in the Moldavian SSR (now Moldova), where Ignatiev graduated from school. In 2002, he graduated from the Faculty of History of the Shevchenko Transnistria State University in Tiraspol, and in 2012, he obtained a master's degree in international law from the National University Odesa Law Academy. Ignatiev began working at the Ministry of Foreign Affairs of Moldova's unrecognized breakaway region of Transnistria in 2002, becoming its head in 2016. He is the main negotiator from Transnistria's side for the solution of the Transnistria conflict. He has also been member of the Joint Control Commission from the part of the Transnistrian delegation.

Ignatiev has received multiple medals and orders from the separatist authorities of Transnistria, but also medals from Georgia's unrecognized breakaway regions of Abkhazia and South Ossetia. Following the start of the Russian invasion of Ukraine, Ignatiev did not condemn Russian aggression and avoided direct questions about the war from journalists. Ignatiev blamed Ukraine for the April 2022 terrorist attacks in Transnistria, and he stated on July of that year at an interview with the Russian state-owned news agency RIA Novosti that the intentions of the separatist authorities in Tiraspol were Transnistria's independence and its annexation into Russia. Regarding the Russian annexation of Crimea, Ignatiev stated in 2014 to Schweizer Radio und Fernsehen's program Rundschau: "Russia has once again confirmed its high status and authority as a power that cares about its citizens living abroad and its compatriots – we see this in the example of Crimea".

In 2024, on 9 January, Ignatiev was summoned by the Security Service of Ukraine (SBU) to receive a written notification that he was suspected of crimes. Ignatiev was summoned to appear at the SBU's office in Vinnytsia between 15 and 17 January, as he was accused of treason, more precisely being a suspect of "violating territorial integrity and inviolability", which implied "public calls for changing the borders of Ukraine"; and of "activities of collaboration", which referred to "the carrying out of information activities in cooperation with the aggressor state", that is, Russia. As of that year, Ignatiev was a citizen of both Russia and Ukraine.
