= Berlin Plus =

Berlin Plus may refer to:

- The Berlin Plus agreement, a short title given to an agreement between the EU and NATO.
- The Berlin Plus package, a group of eight points to be implemented in the Transnistria conflict resolution process.
