= Nina Shtanski =

Transnistrian politician (born 1977)

- Нина Штански
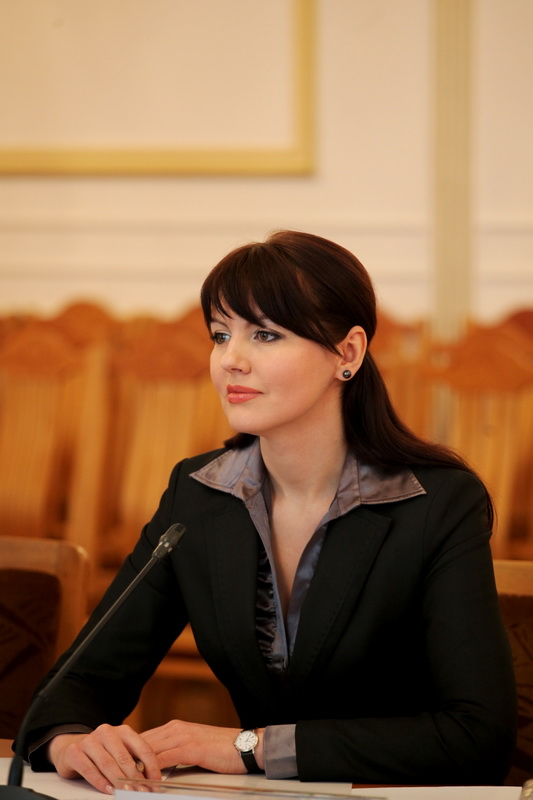
- Shtanski in 2012

First Lady of Transnistria
- In role 19 September 2015 – 16 December 2016
- President: Yevgeny Shevchuk
- Preceded by: Vacant
- Succeeded by: Svetlana Krasnoselskaya

Minister of Foreign Affairs
- In office 24 January 2012 – 14 September 2015
- Prime Minister: Pyotr Stepanov; Tatiana Turanskaya; Maija Parnas (Acting)
- Preceded by: Vladimir Yastrebchak
- Succeeded by: Vitaly Ignatiev

Personal details
- Born: 10 April 1977 (age 49) Tiraspol, Moldavian SSR, Soviet Union (present-day Moldova)
- Party: Independent
- Spouse: Yevgeny Shevchuk
- Education: Transnistrian State University

Nina Viktorovna Shtanski (Romanian: Nina Ștanski; Russian: Нина Викторовна Штански; born 10 April 1977) is a Transnistrian former state politician and public figure. She has been the Deputy Prime Minister for the International Cooperation of the Pridnestrovian Moldavian Republic and the Minister of Foreign Affairs of the Pridnestrovian Moldavian Republic from 24 January 2012 to 2 September 2015, before leaving her position to marry Yevgeny Shevchuk. She became an honoured foreign service officer of the Pridnestrovian Moldavian Republic in 2012. She held the rank of Ambassador Extraordinary and Plenipotentiary.

== Biography ==
She was born 10 April 1977 in the city of Tiraspol, Moldavian SSR. She graduated from the Faculty of Law of the Shevchenko Transnistria State University. Shtanski has spoken about being of Polish descent. 24 December 2012 she defended her thesis for the degree of Candidate of Political Sciences on the theme "Problems of the conflict in Transnistria / Moldova: International Aspects".

From 2002 to 2009 she worked at the Supreme Council of the Pridnestrovian Moldavian Republic in the following positions:

- Leading specialist staff of the Supreme Council of the PMR
- Assistant to the Chairman of the Supreme Council
- Political Advisor to the Chairman of the Supreme Council.

From 2009 to 2011, Shtanski was involved in social and educational activities and an adviser to Yevgeny Shevchuk, who was at that time a deputy of the Supreme Council of Transnistria and the president of the social movement "Obnovlenie." She has taught at the Institute of History, State and Law of the Shevchenko Transnistria State University.

Shtanski was appointed a special representative of the President of the TMR 30 December 2011, after the inauguration of the President of TMR EV Shevchuk; she participated in negotiation processes and interaction with the diplomatic missions and international organizations.

On 24 January 2012, she was appointed Minister of Foreign Affairs of the unrecognized Dniester Moldavian Republic.

On 1 February 2012 by the Decree of the President of the TMR, she was charged a special representative of the President of the TMR in the negotiating process, interaction with the diplomatic missions and international organizations.

On 6 November 2012, by the Decree of the President of Transnistria Yevgeny Shevchuk appointed Deputy Prime Minister of the PMR for international cooperation, while maintaining the position of Minister of Foreign Affairs of the PMR.

She voiced support for the 2014 annexation of Crimea by the Russian Federation and asked Russia to annex Transnistria as well.

She was a member of the Security Council under the President of the Pridnestrovian Moldavian Republic.

Nina Shtanski gave up her government position in September 2015, when she married Yevgeny Shevchuk, the President of Transnistria. She had her first child, a daughter, outside of marriage; it was widely believed at that time that the father was Yevgeny Shevchuk, and the Transnistrian media was presenting the two as close. Shevchuk and Shtanski announced their forthcoming marriage because they were expecting their second child after she got pregnant again. In January 2016, she gave birth to their second child, after their marriage.

Political offices
Preceded by Vladimir Yastrebchak	Minister of Foreign Affairs; 2012–2015	Succeeded by Vitaly Ignatiev
