= Administrative-Territorial Units of the Left Bank of the Dniester =

Autonomous region of Moldova

Administrative-Territorial Units of the Left Bank of the Dniester: Unitățile Administrativ-Teritoriale din stânga Nistrului (Romanian); Административно-территориальные единицы левобережья Днестра (Russian); Адміністративно-територіальні одиниці лівобережжя Дністра (Ukrainian)
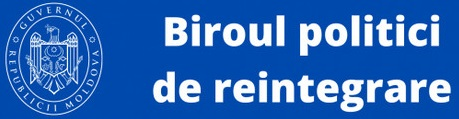
- Logo of the Bureau for Reintegration

- Location and extent of the Administrative-Territorial Units of the Left Bank of the Dniester (red) within Moldova.
- Status: Autonomous region
- Languages: Romanian; Russian; Ukrainian

Government
  - Deputy Prime Minister for Reintegration: Valeriu Chiveri
  - Chairman of the Supreme Council: Vacant
- Legislature: Supreme Council

Autonomous territorial unit of Moldova
  - Created: 27 July 2005

Area
  - Total: 4,163 km^{2} (1,607 sq mi)
  - Water (%): 2.35

Population
  - March 2024 estimate: 367,776 (Moldovan estimate)
  - 2015 census: 475,373
  - Density: 73.5/km^{2} (190.4/sq mi)
- Time zone: UTC+2 (EET)
  - Summer (DST): UTC+3 (EEST)
- Calling code: +373
- Internet TLD: .md

The Administrative-Territorial Units of the Left Bank of the Dniester (Note: Romanian: Unitățile Administrativ-Teritoriale din stînga Nistrului; Russian: Административно-территориальные единицы левобережья Днестра, romanized: Administrativno-territorial'nye edinitsy levoberzh'ya Dnestra; Ukrainian: Адміністративно-територіальні одиниці лівобережжя Дністра, romanized: Administratyvno-terytorial'ni odynytsi livoberezhzhia Dnistra) is a de jure autonomous territorial unit of Moldova established by the Government of Moldova to delineate the territory controlled by the unrecognized state of Transnistria, a territory under Russian military occupation.

== History ==
After the dissolution of the Soviet Union in 1991, the Transnistria War broke out between the Republic of Moldova and the unrecognized state of Transnistria over territories of the former Moldavian Soviet Socialist Republic.

On 22 July 2005, the autonomous territorial unit with special legal status was established in Moldovan law. This was done as part of the Yushchenko Plan for reintegrating Transnistria into Moldova.

== Territory ==
The territory of the Administrative-Territorial Units of the Left Bank of the Dniester mostly coincides with territory of the Transnistria, but there are two important differences:

- Bender (Tighina) is included in the unrecognized state of Transnistria, but it is excluded from the Administrative-Territorial Units of the Left Bank of the Dniester, being part of the historical region of Bessarabia;
- Territories which are claimed by Transnistria but controlled by Moldova are excluded from the autonomous territorial unit. These territories include parts of the Dubăsari District, Căușeni District, and Anenii Noi District.

=== Settlements ===
Transnistria contains 147 settlements (settlements on the east bank of the Dniester river): one municipality, nine towns, two settlements which are parts of towns, 69 villages (communes), and 135 settlements which are parts of villages (communes).

== Administration ==
The government of Moldova has established a Bureau for Reintegration headed by the Deputy Prime Minister for Reintegration.

The law which establishes the Administrative-Territorial Units of the Left Bank of the Dniester states that the region is to elect a Supreme Council on the basis of free, transparent and democratic elections. The Supreme Council should then adopt a Basic Law to formally establish the executive institutions of the region.

The region has the right to adopt its own symbols to be used in conjunction with the national symbols of Moldova. The official languages of the region are Romanian in the Latin script, Russian and Ukrainian. The region would be able to establish relationships with other countries for economic, technical, scientific and humanitarian purposes.

== See also ==
- Administrative divisions of Moldova
- Gagauzia, another autonomous region of Moldova
