= Valeriy Litskai =

Transnistrian politician

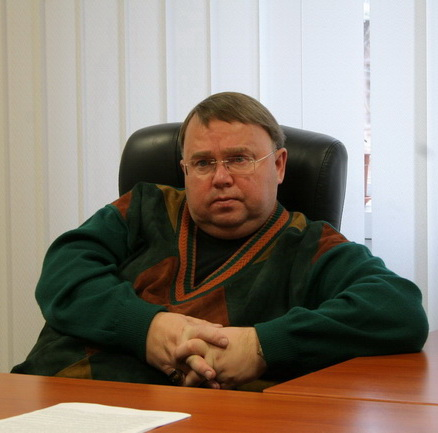
Litskai in 2007

Valeriy Anatolievich Litskai (Russian: Валерий Анатольевич Лицкай; born 13 February 1949) was the foreign minister of Transnistria from 2000 until July 2008. He was born in Tver in Russia in 1949 and obtained Transnistrian citizenship after Transnistria declared independence. He is the head of the commission of negotiations of Transnistria and Moldova and also one of initiators of the Hague initiative on settlement of conflicts in CIS and executive secretary of the Community for Democracy and Rights of Nations.

Recently, Litskai has come under pressure from the Supreme Soviet for the lack of success he has had in getting Transnistria recognized internationally. It was speculated that the pro-western Litskai would soon be replaced by pro-Russian Vladimir Yastrebchak, currently first deputy minister of foreign affairs, also because president Igor Smirnov is now criticising him. On April 2, 2008, Litskai appeared before parliament to defend himself against criticism. Litskai convinced parliament to let him keep his job, but will have to show progress when returning to parliament in July. On July 1 president Smirnov issued a decree to fire Litskai immediately. He was replaced by Yastrebchak, as was previously predicted. This is despite apparent success in talks with Moldova, which resumed earlier this year and were organized by Litskai.

Litskai speaks English and Spanish.
