= Romania–Transnistria relations =

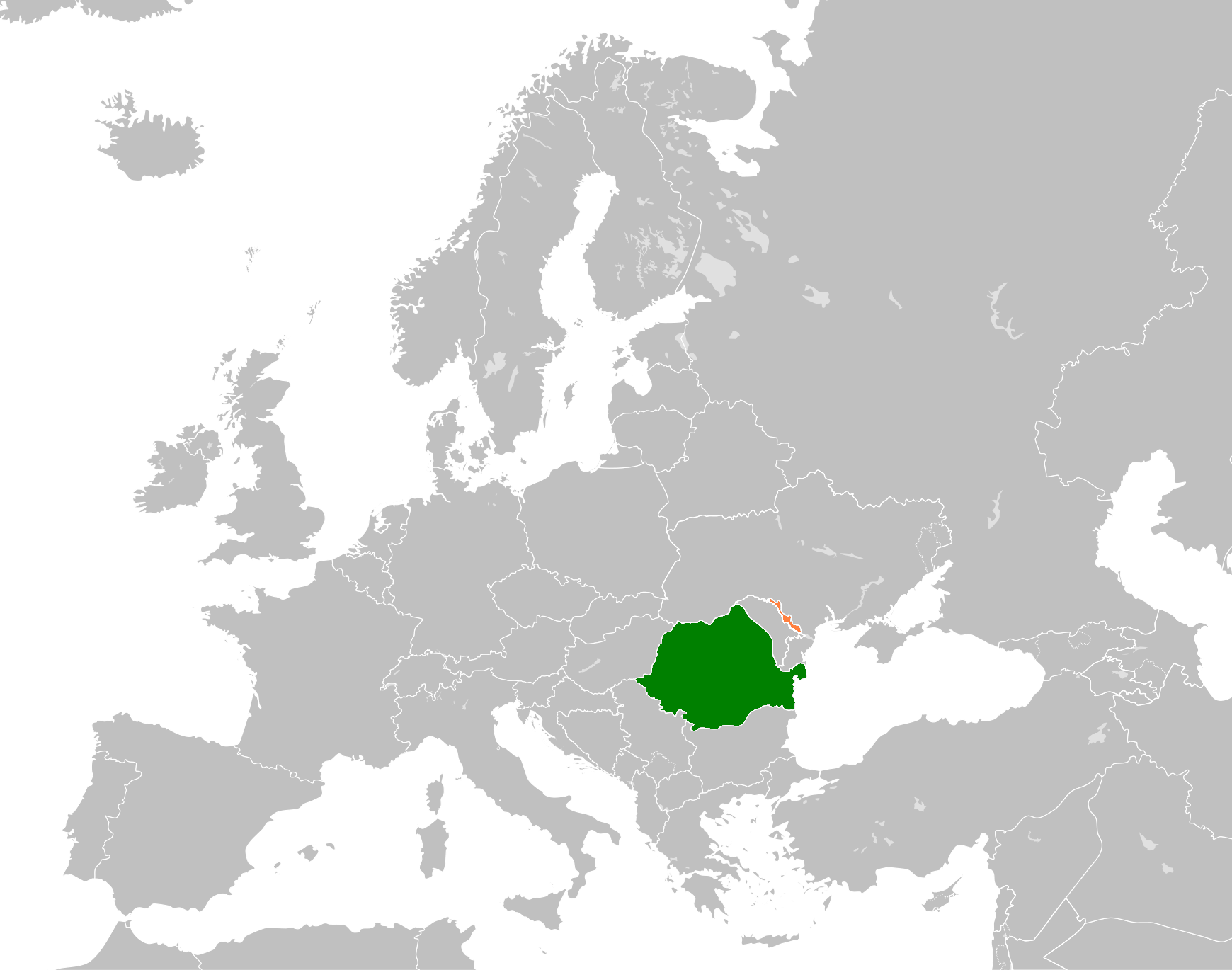

- Romania: Transnistria

Romania–Transnistria relations refer to the limited bilateral relations between Romania and the self-proclaimed Pridnestrovian Moldavian Republic, more commonly referred to as Transnistria. In line with the consensus of the international community, Romania does not recognize Transnistria as a sovereign state, instead affirming its status as an integral part of the Republic of Moldova. In 2022, the Parliamentary Assembly of the Council of Europe adopted a resolution characterizing Transnistria as a territory under Russian military occupation. This resolution was introduced by 21 deputies, among whom nine were Romanian.

Historically, Transnistria developed separately from the Principality of Moldavia and was not part of the Kingdom of Romania, which later encompassed most of present-day Moldova. As an administrative entity, Transnistria emerged in the early Soviet period, partly as a response to Romania’s control of Bessarabia between 1918 and 1940. During the Second World War, the region, along with parts of present-day Odesa Oblast of Ukraine, was occupied and administered by Romania as the Transnistria Governorate. After the war, it was incorporated into the Moldavian Soviet Socialist Republic. Soviet authorities promoted a distinct Moldovan identity, including the use of the Cyrillic script, and emphasized narratives critical of the Romanian rule. Following the dissolution of the Soviet Union, Moldova declared independence in 1991 and Transnistria followed suit, proclaiming its own independence and positioning itself as separate from both the newly independent Moldovan state and its Soviet predecessor.

Generally, Romania is viewed negatively in Transnistrian society, largely due to its Western alignment and close relations with Moldova. During the Transnistrian War, Romania provided significant support to Moldova and has also briefly participated in post-war mechanisms aimed at stabilizing the region. As a self-proclaimed secessionist entity with a population largely composed of ethnic Russians and Ukrainians, Transnistria has consistently opposed any attempts at unification between Moldova and Romania. The authorities in Tiraspol have also expressed opposition to Moldova’s constitutional commitment for integration in the European Union, a block to which Romania belongs since 2007, viewing such developments as contrary to Transnistria’s interests.

In 2010, the Romanian government agreed to participate in the NATO missile defence system. As a reaction, the Transnistrian government suggested a deployment of medium-range 9K720 Iskander missiles in Transnistria. Three years later, experts considered this scenario unlikely.

In 2016, the Press Service of the Foreign Ministry of Transnistria protested against the alleged recurring intrusion of Romanian airplanes into Transnistrian air space.

In 2017, journalists of several Romanian media like România liberă and Digi24 visited Tiraspol and interviewed the Transnistrian foreign minister.

In 2019, Transnistrian president Vadim Krasnoselsky said, that for him, "Ukraine, Russia and Moldova (are) more relevant than Romania".

In Transnistria, Romania is traditionally seen as an antagonist.

In 2013, Romania was Transnistria's third largest export partner. In 2022, two thirds of all Transnistrian exports went to the European Union and most of them to Romania.

== See also ==
- Moldova–Romania relations
- Transnistria conflict
