= 2006 Transnistrian independence referendum =

Referendum in unrecognized state

- 17 September 2006
- Do you think it is possible for the Moldovan Republic of Transnistria to renounce its independence and then join the Republic of Moldova?

Results
Choice	Votes	%
Yes	10,308	3.38%
No	294,253	96.62%
Valid votes	304,561	98.19%
Invalid or blank votes	5,608	1.81%
Total votes	310,169	100.00%
Registered voters/turnout	394,861	78.55%

- Do you support the course for the independence of the Moldovan Republic of Transnistria and the subsequent voluntary accession of Transnistria to the Russian Federation?

Results
Choice	Votes	%
Yes	301,332	98.08%
No	5,905	1.92%
Valid votes	307,237	99.05%
Invalid or blank votes	2,932	0.95%
Total votes	310,169	100.00%
Registered voters/turnout	394,861	78.55%

A double referendum was held in Moldova's unrecognized breakaway region of Transnistria on 17 September 2006. Voters were asked whether they approved of the possibility of renouncing independence and integration with Moldova, or alternatively independence and possible future integration into Russia.

Foreign actors described infringements, a lack of conditions for free will expression and a biased wording in the questions of the referendum, and its results were not recognized internationally.

== Background ==
Pro-Moldovan organisations announced before the referendum that they would not recognise its results. Ballots for the referendum were reprinted three times, as the chairman of electoral commission, Piotr Denisenko, announced a shrinkage of electorate of 7% compared with the previous year. Moreover, according to the 2004 Transnistrian census, only 90% of the population of Transnistria had Transnistrian citizenship and could thus vote, and many of the rest have only Moldovan citizenship. In the 2004 Transnistrian census, 107,600 thousand people (19,4%) listed themselves as citizens of the Republic of Moldova, while 56,000 people (10,1%) claimed citizenship of the Russian Federation and 44,400 people (8,0%) citizenship of Ukraine; this was hardly reflected in the referendum results.

== Results ==
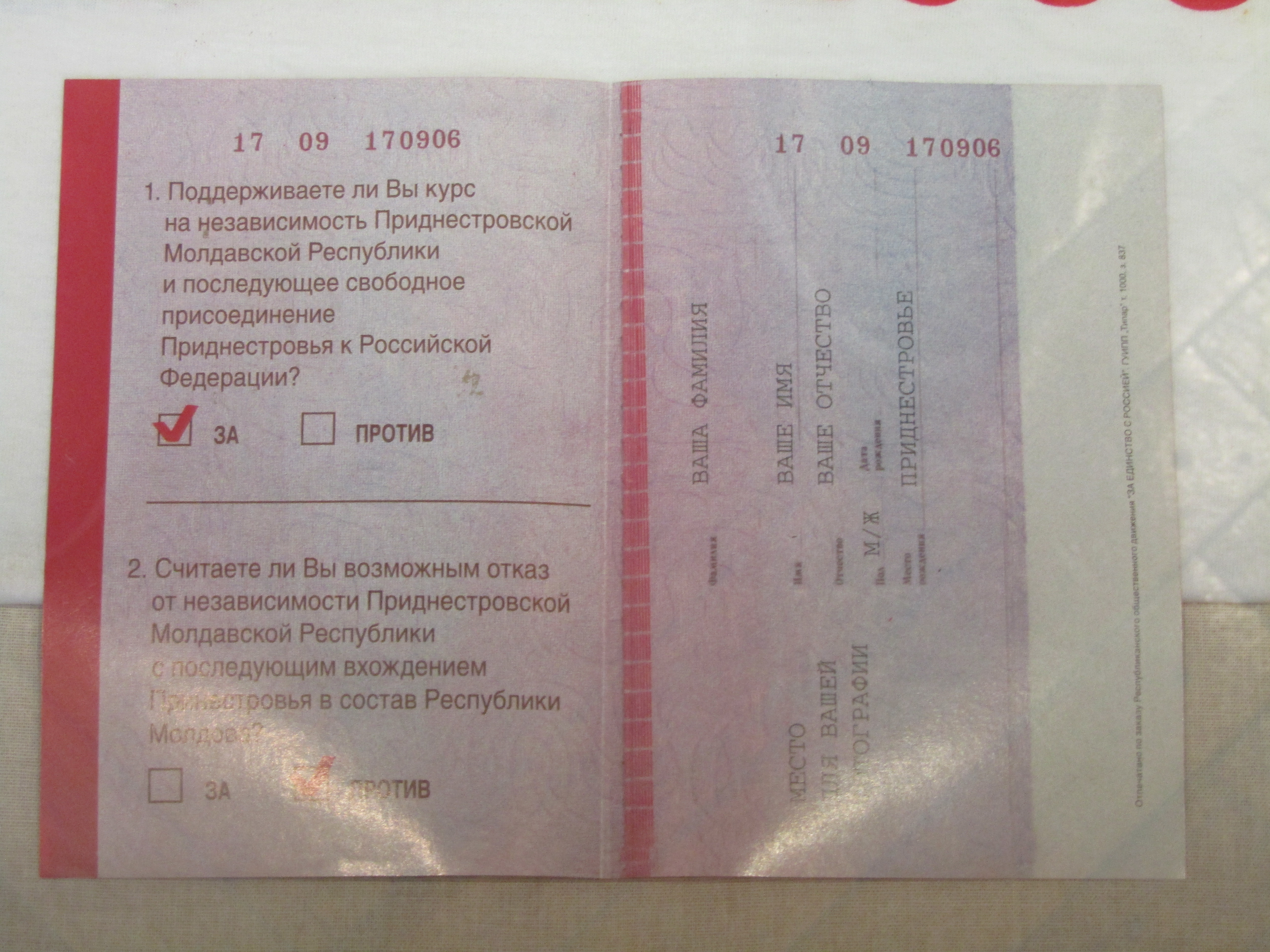
Voting card displayed in Tiraspol museum

=== Renouncing independence and potential future integration into Moldova ===
Choice	Votes	%
For	10,308	3.39
Against	294,253	96.61
Invalid/blank votes	5,608	–
Total	310,169	100
Registered voters/turnout	394,861	78.55
Source: Direct Democracy

=== Independence and potential future integration into Russia ===
Choice	Votes	%
For	301,332	98.07
Against	5,905	1.93
Invalid/blank votes	2,932	–
Total	310,169	100
Registered voters/turnout	394,861	78.55
Source: Direct Democracy

Of the total of 394,861 registered voters, the voter turnout was 78.6%, substantially more than the 50%+1 required by law to validate the referendum. On the day of the referendum, no exit polling was allowed within 25 meters of polling stations, to prevent disruption of voting.

== Reactions ==
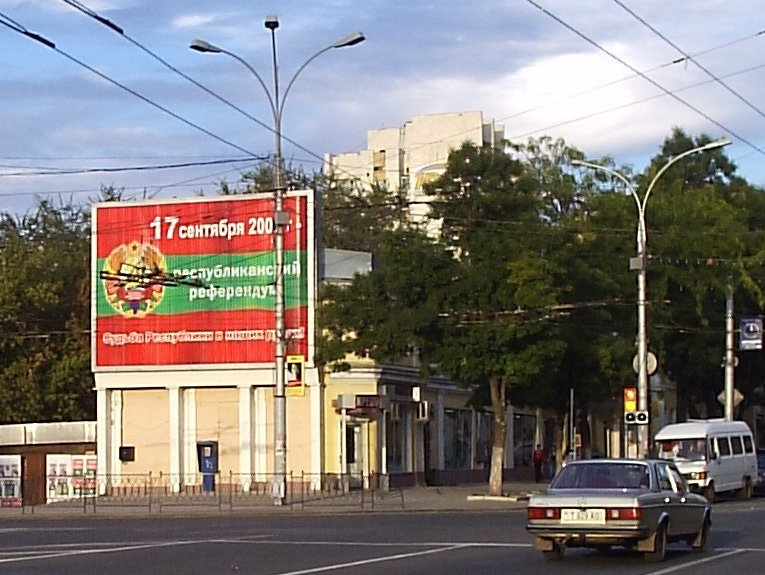
Poster announcing 17 September Referendum in Transnistria

International organisations, such as the Organisation for Economic Co-operation and Development, European Union, GUAM, and some other countries (Ukraine, Romania, Bulgaria, Turkey, Serbia, Macedonia, Croatia, Montenegro, Bosnia, Albania, Norway, Iceland) did not recognise the referendum.

The representative of the Congress of Russian Communities from Moldova declared that the referendum was held according to international standards. However, no internationally recognised monitoring organisations had observers present.

Viktor Alksnis, a deputy from the Russian party "Rodina" stated that referendum in Transnistria was held without any violations of legislation and democratic standards. Viktor Alksnis is known to have previously described the Transnistrian Republic as the base from which the Soviet Union's restoration would begin.

In the opinion of the Ukrainian foreign ministry, the situation in Transnistria failed to meet the conditions of a free will expression by citizens.

According to the OSCE, the media climate in the Transdniestrian region is restrictive, as authorities there continue a long-standing campaign to silence independent opposition voices and movements. Although the OSCE decided not to send any observers to monitor the referendum, 130 observers from CIS and Europe and from eleven election monitoring organizations who did attend the referendum had different reactions.

In contrast, the Helsinki Committee for Human Rights in Moldova (HCHRM) claims to have observed a series of infringements at the referendum:

1. Groups of activists going into people's homes, especially in Tiraspol and Bender districts, asking why they did not come to the referendum, and threatening that after the referendum they will be forced to look for a new home in Romania.
2. At some voting stations agents dressed in civil or militia uniforms forcing the observers from outside the sections to stay at a distance of 200–250 meters far from these places.
3. "Cleaning" of the list of voters by excluding some citizens who previously boycotted elections and referendums held in Transnistria.
4. "Electoral tourism" and multiple voting

Karel De Gucht (Chairman of the OSCE) expressed an opinion about the "lack of basic requirements for free and fair elections, such as freedom of the media, freedom of assembly and political pluralism, in the region pre-determined the results" and argued that the questions in the referendum are suggestively worded. In a possible manipulation of the public opinion, people are asked to choose between freedom ("free association") and loss of independence ("renounce the Transnistria's independent status"), between reality ("support the course") and possibility ("consider it possible"). As he said, this formulation could have resulted in a response bias.

Victor Josu, deputy editor-in-chief of Russian-language Moldovan newspaper Moldavskie Vedomosti, an accredited observer, described the referendum as a successful public relations action (regardless of violations and a lack of recognition) and reported favorably on a comparison between "recognized Chişinau" and "unrecognized Tiraspol" in an article which emphasized the openness, transparency and glasnost of the referendum process.

Sergei Bagapsh, president of Abkhazia (Abkhazia claims independence from Georgia, but has a disputed status), has said his republic "supports the aspirations of Transniestria toward independence and its choice of unification with Russia."

According to the results of a telephone survey on the morning of September 18, 63% of the listeners (782 people) of the Ekho Moskvy radio station were in favor of accepting Transnistria into Russia, while 37% (466 people) were against.

== See also ==
- Elections in Transnistria
- Human rights in Transnistria
- Politics of Transnistria
- Proposed Russian annexation of Transnistria
