= Vehicle registration plates of Transnistria =

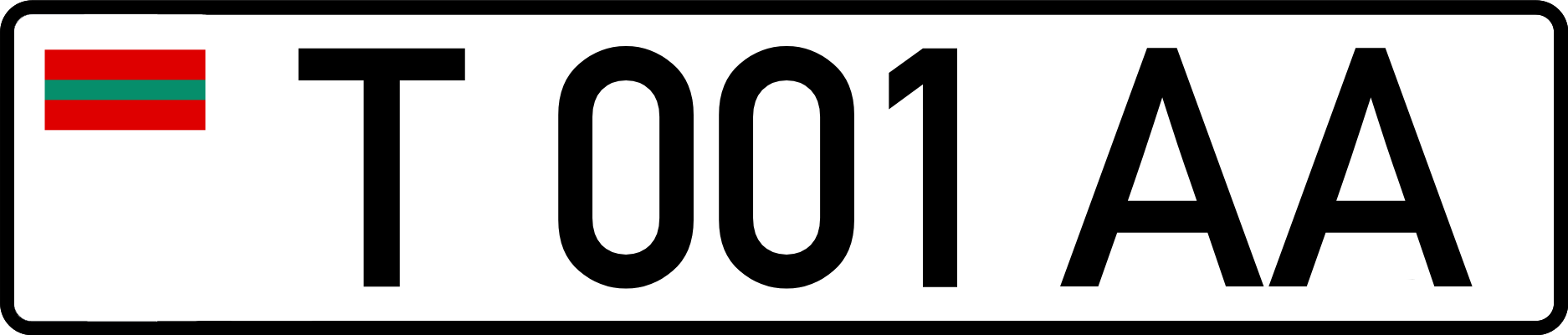
Sample Passenger Vehicle registration plate from Tiraspol

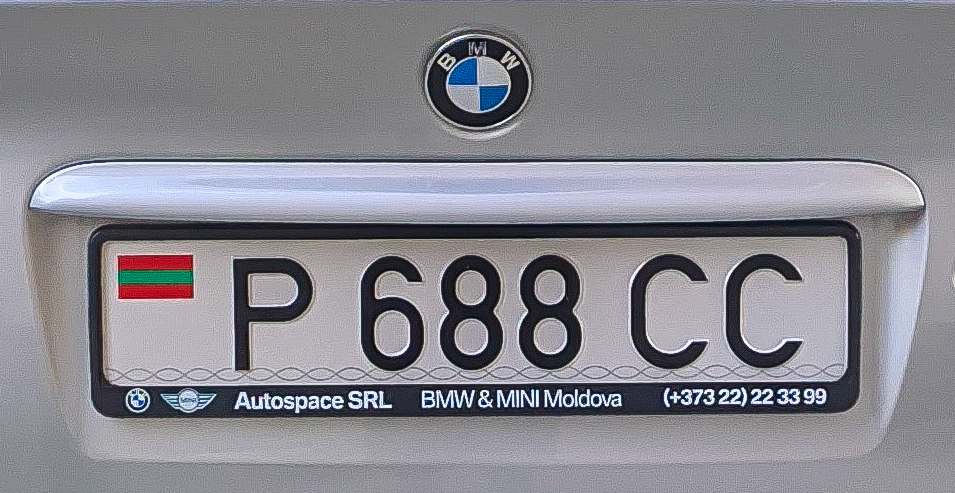
Currently issued plate for passenger cars, since 2015. A holographic sticker and separation line were removed.

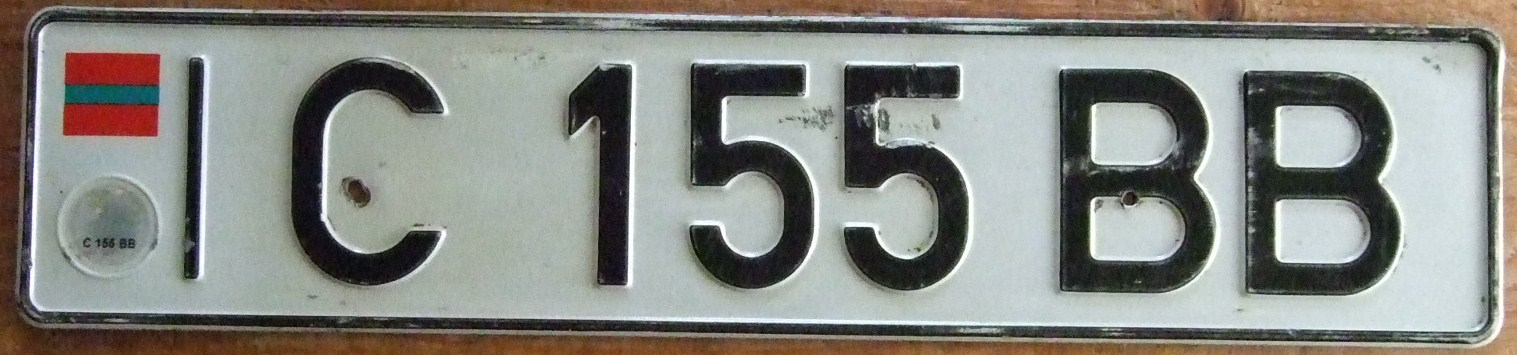
Plate for passenger cars issued until 2015.

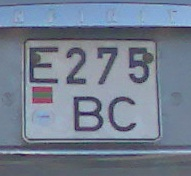
Rear passenger car plate

Standard license plates of Transnistria are 520 mm wide and 112 mm high, made of metal with 6 embossed characters - one letter, three numbers and two more letters - written using the DIN 1451 Mittelschrift font. On the left part of the plates there is also a modified euroband on a white background, having the flag of the PMR instead of the EU symbol. A holographic sticker in the place of the international country code underneath it was placed until 2015, when a law was revised, additionally removing black separation line between euroband and registration number; instead, two interpolated grey sine waves were added on the bottom of the plate. Government plates only have 5 embossed characters - three numbers and two letters. Only symbols that are common to both the Cyrillic and the Latin alphabets are used, and with their Cyrillic meaning (A, B, C, E, H, K, M, P, T, X, Y). Its current design derives from Moldovan plates of 1992 design, but is slightly changed. Military plates are using Soviet design from 1959, and tractor plates are also using Soviet design, but from 1980.

The first letter denotes the town or district where the vehicle was registered:

Code	Region	Sample
A	Bender	
B	Grigoriopol	
E	Dubăsari	
H	Tiraspol (mopeds only)	
K	Camenca	
P	Rîbnița	
C	Slobozia	
T	Tiraspol	

‍‍There is an ongoing debate between the Moldovan authorities and the government of Transnistria on a design to be used on Transnistrian plates that is acceptable for Moldova also. Moldovan authorities have been reported to confiscate Transnistrian plates as the registration of vehicles in the Transnistrian region is illegal for Moldovans. In 2018, Transnistria began issuing a neutral design with MD sticker license plate that works in the European Union.

== Diplomatic Corps Codes ==
There are only three consulates in Transnistria using the three central digits on a normal diplomatic plate. Here is a list of every code:

Code	Country
001	Russia
002	Ukraine
003	South Ossetia

Army plate

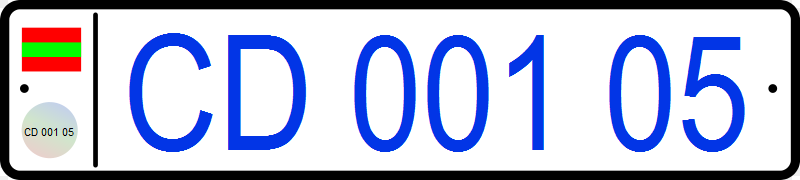
Diplomatic plate

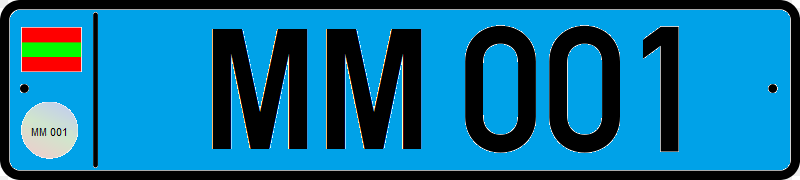
Ministry of Internal Affairs plate

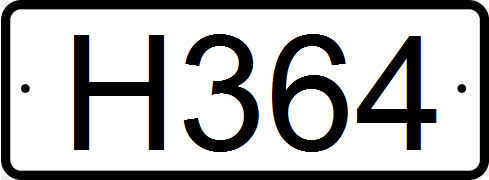
Moped plate

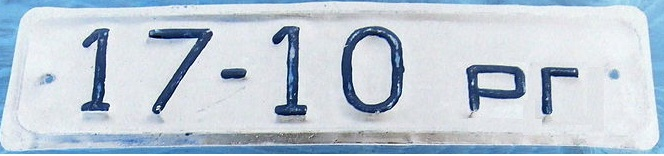
Military front plate

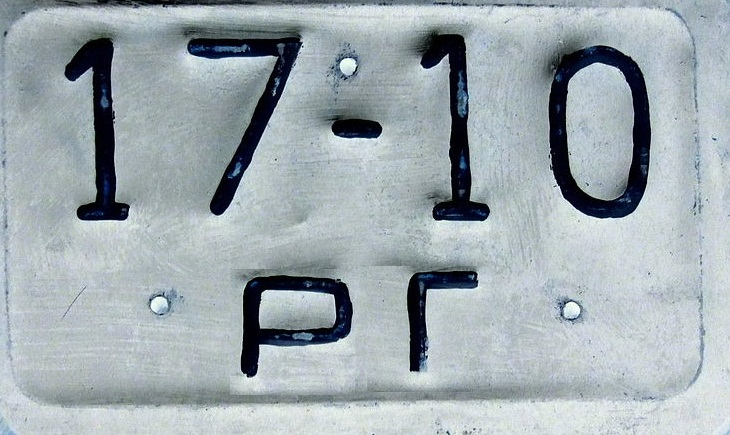
Military rear plate

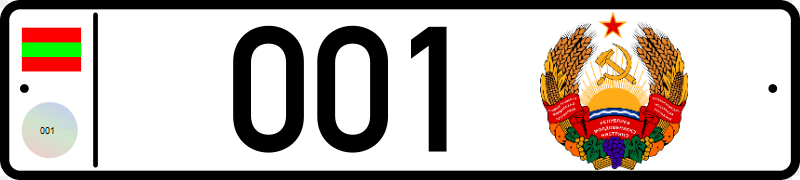
Presidential plate

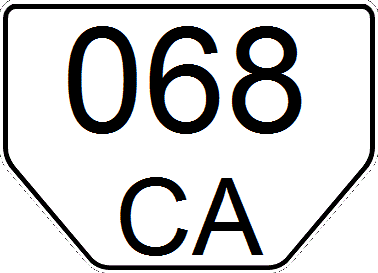
Tractor plate

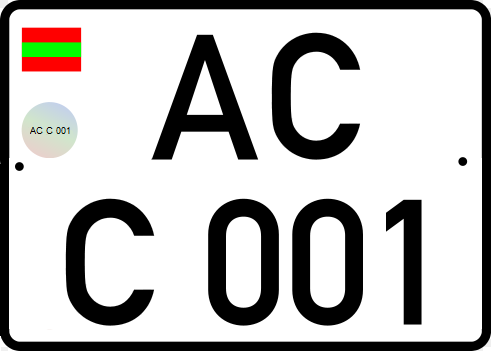
Trailer plate

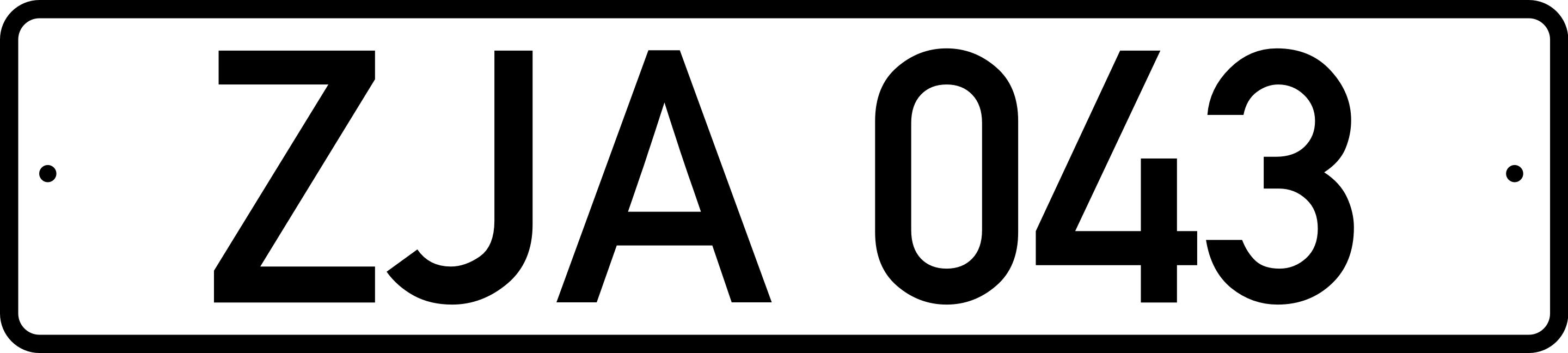
Neutral plate

== See also ==
- Vehicle registration plates of Moldova
