= Reintegration of Transnistria into Moldova =

Proposals since the Transnistria conflict

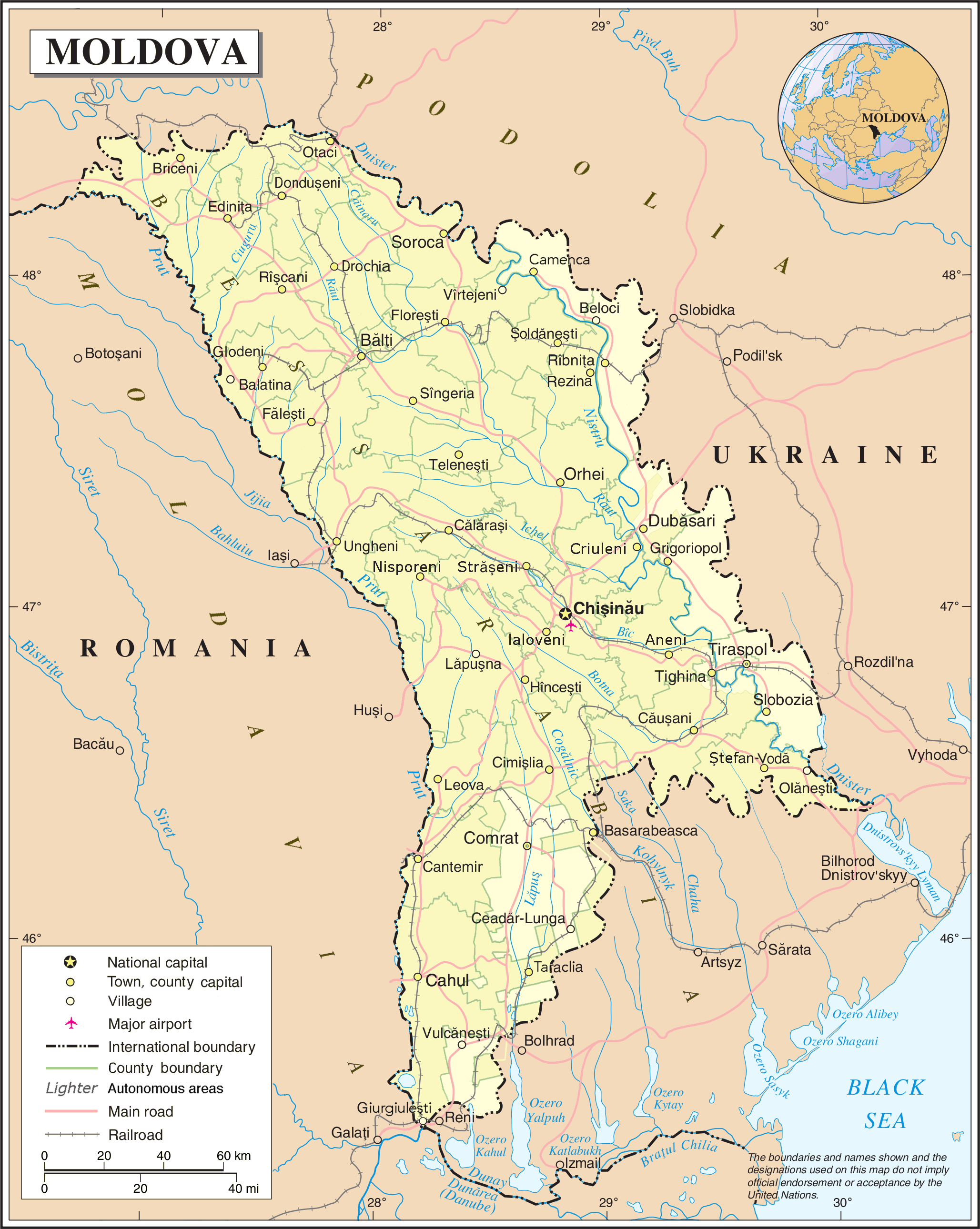
Map of Moldova showing the territory of Transnistria simply as another part of the country

Since the outbreak of the Transnistria conflict, there have been efforts and proposals to reincorporate the unrecognized state of Transnistria into Moldova.

== Background ==
Following the Transnistrian War in the early 1990s, Transnistria assumed de facto independence supported by a Russian military presence. This territory is internationally recognized as being part of Moldova and no other country has recognised its independence.

In international law, Transnistria is considered a part of Moldova and the reintegration of Transnistria into Moldova has been proposed many times. Some surveys done in the territory suggest that many people would like to join Moldova in a federation. Many Transnistrians also have Moldovan passports, and some vote in Moldovan elections.

Both former president of Moldova Igor Dodon and current president Maia Sandu have expressed their intention to reintegrate Transnistria with Moldova, although they disagreed on how to implement this. An assessment carried out by USAID in the early 2000s suggested that the reintegration of Transnistria would require substantial assistance from Western donors, yet its de facto secession contributed to economic and political problems within Moldova.

On entering office, Sandu called for Russian troops to leave Moldova and stated that she was committed to reintegrating Transnistria.

== History ==
One occasion in which a resolution to the Transnistrian conflict came close was on 8 May 1997. On that date was signed the 1997 Moscow Memorandum, devised by the Prime Minister of Russia Yevgeny Primakov and supported by Ukraine and the Organization for Security and Co-operation in Europe (OSCE), which gave Transnistria the right to establish its own international economic treaties and regulate its own economic activities and also to participate in any foreign policy decision made by the Moldovan Government. However, the agreement included a part which called Moldova and Transnistria "to construct their relations within the framework of a common state" but without details about what this state would be like. This part was subject to different interpretations by both parties. While Moldovans thought that the country would be a unitary state and that Transnistria would have to adopt Moldovan institutions and laws, Transnistrians pushed by a loose confederation. Therefore, the agreement failed, although the controversial part continued to be discussed years later.

Further progress would be made in 2003. The Moldovan President Vladimir Voronin, who had already stated that one of his key goals of his presidency would be to integrate Transnistria back, proposed to the Transnistrian president Igor Smirnov to assist him to write a new Moldovan constitution to convert the country into a federal state, which Smirnov accepted. Thus began Moldovan–Transnistrian negotiations with Russian, Ukrainian and OSCE mediation. Dmitry Kozak, Deputy Prime Minister of Russia, would also participate in these negotiations following the call by Voronin to Russian president Vladimir Putin to mediate on them, but separately and not with the other mediators. A draft of the so-called Kozak memorandum, which would establish an "asymmetric" federal state, was presented by Kozak the end of the year and both sides accepted it. However, an updated version of the agreement included articles allowing a long-term Russian military presence in Moldova, something the mediators were against. Furthermore, the Kozak memorandum met with strong popular opposition in the country. For these reasons, on 24 November, shortly before Putin left Moscow to arrive in Chișinău to witness the signing, Voronin decided to reject the agreement, making the Kozak memorandum another failed resolution attempt.

On 26 April 2022, amidst the Russian invasion of Ukraine, Ukrainian presidential adviser Oleksiy Arestovych said during an interview that Ukraine could solve the problem of Transnistria "in the blink of an eye", suggesting military action against Transnistria but only if Moldovan authorities requested the country's help. Moldova officially declined the proposal, expressing its support only for a peaceful outcome of the conflict. During an interview published on 27 August 2023, President of Ukraine Volodymyr Zelenskyy said that a Ukrainian victory over Russia could allow the reintegration of Transnistria into Moldova, the restoration of Georgia's territorial integrity and the end of the Alexander Lukashenko regime in Belarus.

== Public opinion ==
In a study organized by the Black Sea University Foundation between October 2018 and February 2019, when a group of Transnistrians were asked about what option would lead to a faster development of the republic, 5.2% of them responded with reintegration into Moldova. On the other hand, 37.1% of them replied with becoming part of Russia, while 22.6% said that an independent and internationally recognized Transnistria would. The same study showed low adherence to a Moldovan identity by Transnistrians, regardless of their ethnicity. 14% felt Moldovan, while 37.3% felt Transnistrian, 35.7% Russian and 7.4% Ukrainian. Results changed according to age, as although 16% of Transnistrians over 60 felt Moldovan, as did 17.4% of those between 45 and 59 years old and 15.7% of those between 30 and 44 years old, only 7.2% of people between the ages of 18 and 29 did. Furthermore, 13.2% of Transnistrians thought Moldova was a threat for Transnistria; the country with the lead on this aspect was Ukraine with 41.9%. Still, 5.8% and 49.3% of Transnistrians described relations between the population of Moldova and Transnistria as very good or good respectively, with 32.1% and 7.4% saying weak or very weak and with the remaining 5.4% not replying.

In a poll conducted in February–April 2026, the results of which were presented by Moldovan news outlet Zona de Securitate and Moldovan think tank WatchDog.MD, 53% of the polled residents in Transnistria stated they would vote in a referendum for the region's reintegration into Moldova, with 36% stating they would vote against. The poll results were not weighted, and the opinions of women and young people in the region were underrepresented. In 2025, support and opposal of reintegration had been 47% and 38% respectively, and 45% and 38% in 2024, showing an upward pro-reintegration trend in recent years. In a 14–24 May 2026 poll by iData, 44.2% of Moldovans expressed support for Transnistria's full and complete reintegration, 17.9% for preserving the status quo, 12.4% for reintegrating the region with special autonomy and only 8.4% for recognizing Transnistria's independence.

== See also ==
- Gagauzia conflict
- Proposed Russian annexation of Transnistria
- Moldova–Transnistria relations
- Unification of Moldova and Romania
- Romanian nationalism
- Social Democratic Party of Transnistria, in favor of reintegration into Moldova with the condition of high autonomy
