= 5+2 format =

Multilateral negotiation platform aimed at solving the Transnistria conflict

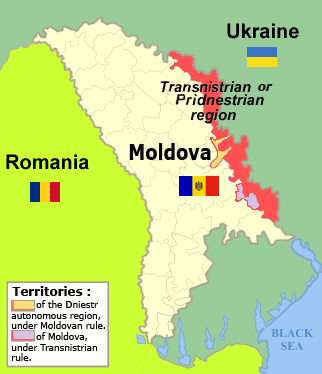
Territorial control after the end of the Transnistrian War

The 5+2 format, also known as the 5+2 talks, the 5+2 negotiations and the 5+2 process, is a diplomatic negotiation platform aimed at finding a solution to the Transnistria conflict between Moldova and the unrecognized state of Transnistria. It is composed of the latter two, which are designated as "parties to the conflict", and Russia, Ukraine and the Organization for Security and Co-operation in Europe (OSCE), "mediators" of the negotiations. The European Union (EU) and the United States act as "observers".

The inclusion of Romania into the 5+2 format has been proposed. Initially, negotiations to resolve the Transnistria conflict took place in a "4" format, including Moldova, Russia, Ukraine and Romania. However, after the signing of the Transnistria War ceasefire agreement on 21 July 1992 by Moldovan president Mircea Snegur and Russian president Boris Yeltsin, Romania was excluded from the negotiation process in 1993.

The 5+2 format started in 2005, but due to the notice sent by Ukraine to the European Union Border Assistance Mission to Moldova and Ukraine (EUBAM) regarding the great amount of Transnistrian smuggling on Ukrainian territory, Transnistria and Russia suspended formal negotiations in 2006, with them only being formally resumed in 2012.

In June 2016, through 5+2 format negotiations, eight points to work on during negotiations were agreed upon between Moldova and Transnistria, these points being collectively known as the Berlin Plus package. By April 2018, six of these points had been implemented, after which negotiations stalled due to domestic and global changes.

In 2022, 5+2 format negotiations were rendered impossible as a result of the Russian invasion of Ukraine, as both Russia and Ukraine are members of the format.

== See also ==
- 1997 Moscow memorandum
- 1999 Istanbul summit
- 2003 Kozak memorandum
- 2005 Yushchenko Plan
