= Taras Shevchenko Transnistria State University =

Public university in Tiraspol, Transnistria

Coordinates: 46°50′15″N 29°37′54″E

Taras Shevchenko Pridnestrovian State University
- Native names: Приднестровский государственный университет имени Т. Г. Шевченко (Russian) Придністровський державний університет імені Т. Г. Шевченка (Ukrainian) Университатя де Стат Нистрянэ «Т. Г. Шевченко» (Romanian) Universitatea de Stat din Tiraspol
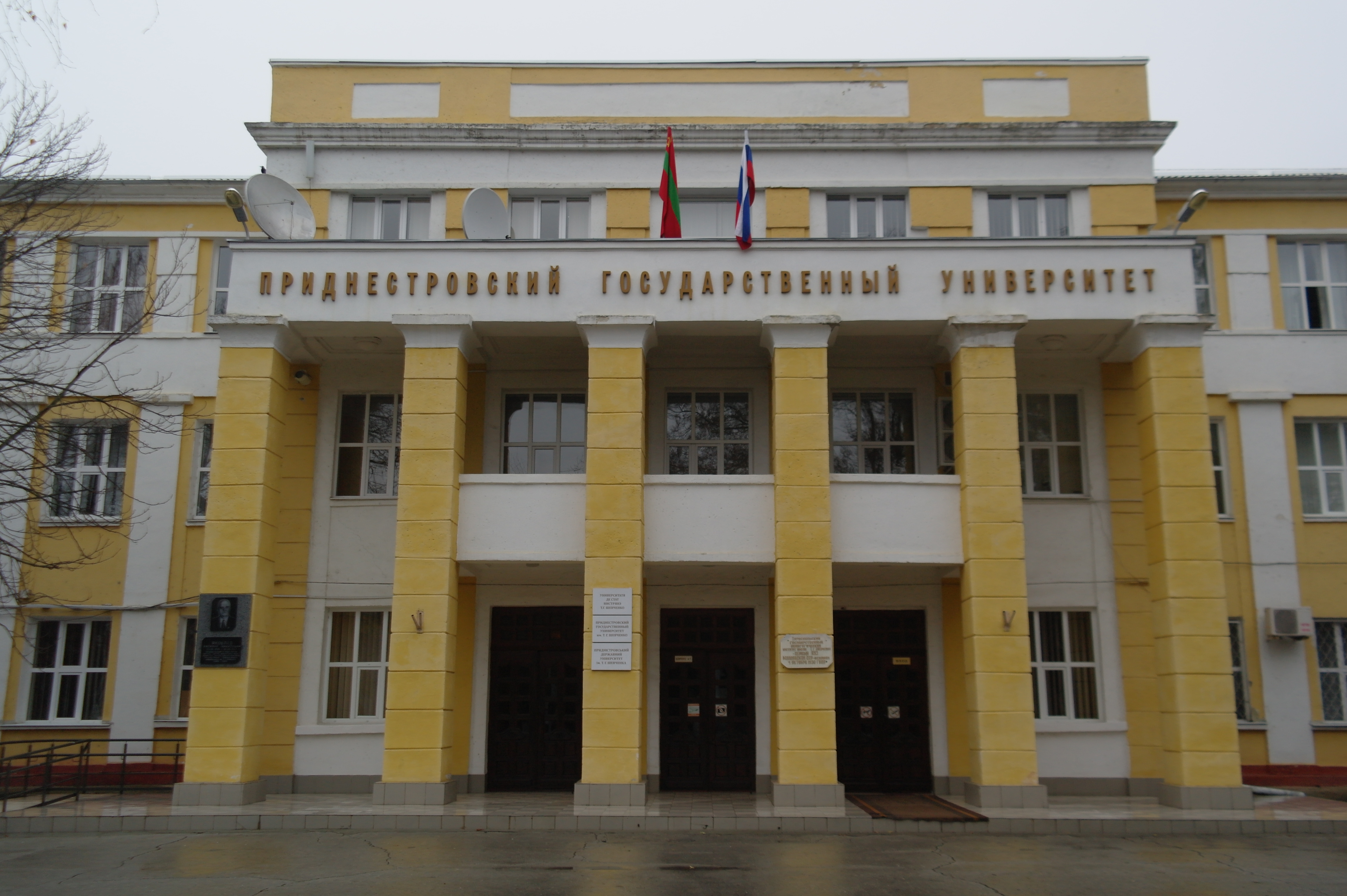
- Former name: Taras Shevchenko State Pedagogical Institute (1933–1992)
- Motto: Latin: Per Ardua ad Astra "Through Adversity to the Stars"
- Type: Public
- Established: 1930
- Rector: Larisa Skitskaya
- Students: 11,000
- Location: Tiraspol, Moldova (de jure); Transnistria (Note: Transnistria's political status is disputed. It considers itself to be an independent state, but this is not recognised by any UN member state. The Moldovan government and the international community consider Transnistria a part of Moldova's territory.) (de facto)
- Website: spsu.ru

The Taras Shevchenko Transnistria State University (Russian: Приднестровский государственный университет имени Т. Г. Шевченко, romanized: Pridnestrovsky gosudarstvennyy universitet imeni T. G. Shevchenko) is a public university located in Tiraspol, Transnistria.

== History ==
The original university in Tiraspol was founded in 1930 as the State Pedagogical Institute in the Moldavian Autonomous Soviet Socialist Republic (MASSR), then being a constituent part of the Ukrainian SSR located in modern Transnistria. The institution was renamed in 1939 to honor the Ukrainian poet and painter Taras Shevchenko, on his 125th birthday.

In 1940, after the Soviet occupation of Bessarabia, part of the territory of the MASSR, including the city of Tiraspol, was allocated to the new Moldavian SSR formed by the Soviets.

In July 1992, as a result of the Transnistria War, the university was officially moved to Chișinău (the capital of Moldova), where it continued to function under the name of Tiraspol State University (UST) (Romanian: Universitatea de Stat din Tiraspol), while in Tiraspol it was reorganized as the Transnistrian State University (PSU). Thus the university was split in two, both claiming to be the original institution founded in 1930. In the summer of 2022, the Natalia Gavrilița government adopted a government decision on the reorganization of some of the educational institutions it manages, by which Tiraspol State University (UST) in Chișinău was to be merged with the Ion Creangă State Pedagogical University of Chișinău. On January 1, 2023, the university officially merged with Ion Creangă, and Tiraspol State University was abolished. In Chișinău, the university had 5 faculties (physics, mathematics, IT, biology and chemistry, philology, geography and pedagogy) and 7 departments, offering studies in 42 specialties, 17 specializations, and 5 scientific specialties.

== Structure ==
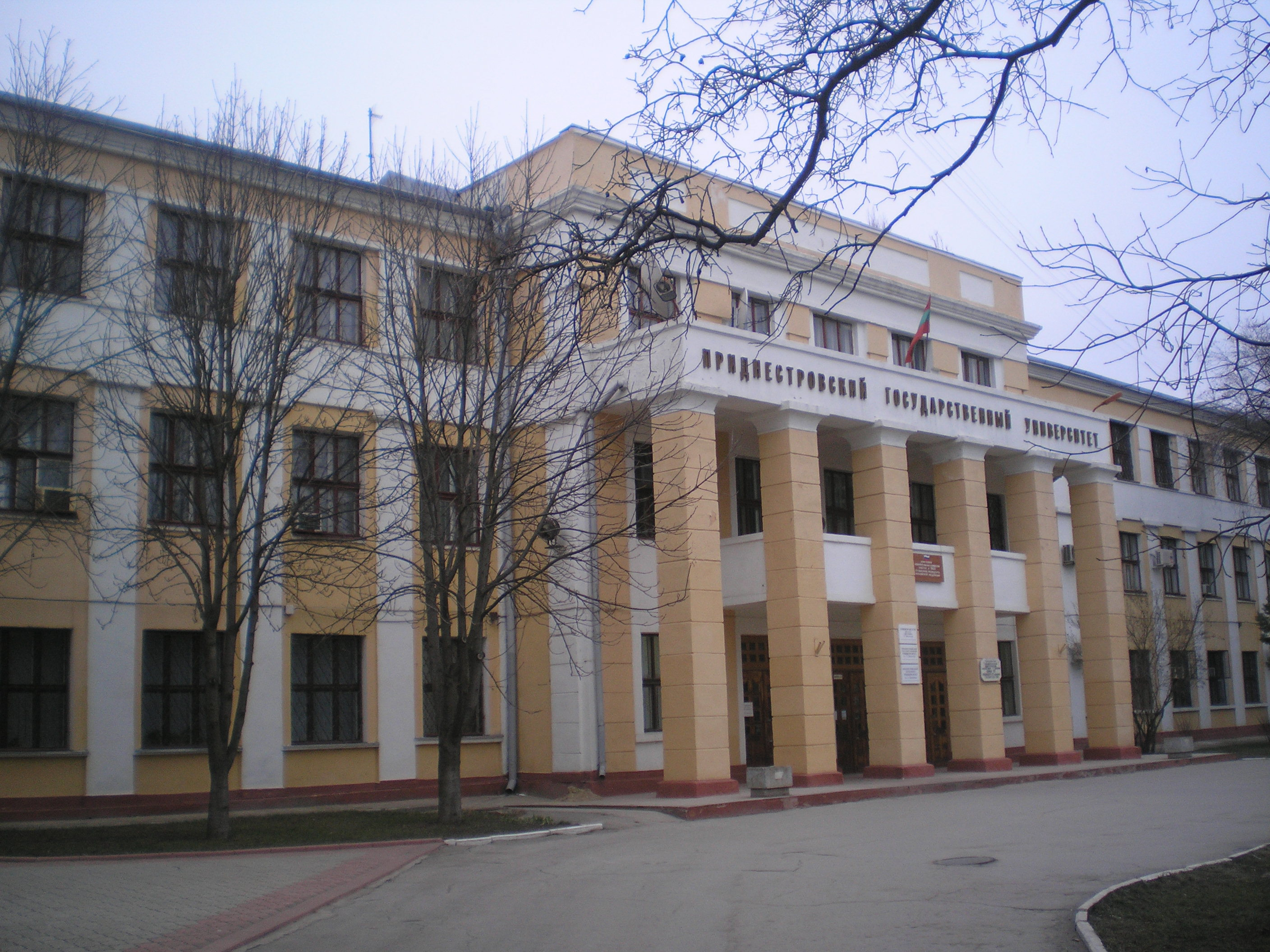
The university in Tiraspol (PSU)

The Taras Shevchenko State University consists of 12 buildings. It offers internationally accredited courses in partnerships with universities in Russia. Students can study both internally and in absentia. Not only citizens of Transnistria can study there but also people from abroad. Education can be either free or paid. The university employs over 1,000 teaching staff including 36 Doctors and 220 Masters of Science. Among its publications, the Atlas of Transnistria is often used as a source for data, specialized maps and statistics on Transnistria.

The university has 8 faculties and 84 chairs, offering 54 different majors. Classes are taught mainly in Russian, with only a few programs in Romanian (called "Moldovan in Cyrillic script") and Ukrainian.

- Agrarian and Technological Faculty
- Faculty of Natural Geography
- Faculty of Medicine
- Faculty of Pedagogy and Psychology
- Faculty of Physical Education and Sports
- Faculty of Physics and Mathematics
- Faculty of Philology
- Faculty of Economics

There are also four institutes and branches.

- Institute of Public Administration, Law and Social Sciences and Humanities
- Engineering and Technical Institute
- Bender Polytechnic Branch
- Rîbnița Branch
