= Kozak memorandum =

2003 Russian proposal to federalize Moldova and settle the Transnistria conflict

Gagauzia (blue), the territory controlled by Transnistria as of 2003 (yellow) and Moldova proper (white). The Kozak memorandum proposed a federation in which the former two would have gained a degree of autonomy effectively amounting to veto power.

The Kozak memorandum (Romanian: Memorandumul Kozak; Russian: Меморандум Козака), officially the Russian Draft Memorandum on the Basic Principles of the State Structure of a United State in Moldova, was a 2003 proposal developed by the first deputy head of the Russian presidential administration Dmitry Kozak aimed at a final settlement of relations between Moldova and its Russian-backed unrecognized breakaway region of Transnistria and a solving of the Transnistria conflict.

The memorandum aimed to transform Moldova into an asymmetric federal state composed by Moldova, Transnistria and the already autonomous region of Gagauzia. The former and the latter two were to hold the same amount of seats in the federation's to-be-established Senate despite Transnistria and Gagauzia representing only 18% of Moldova's population as of 2004, effectively granting the two pro-Russian regions veto power over Moldovan politics and legislation. Moldova was also to become a demilitarised neutral state, and Russia was to withdraw its military forces in the country no later than 2020. Federation subjects would be allowed to secede in case of the loss of sovereignty by the federation or its decision to accede into another state.

In 2026, according to unconfirmed reports, Russia proposed Moldova's federalization into three parts, Moldova proper, Transnistria and Gagauzia, and the withdrawal of its forces in Transnistria in exchange for Moldova's declaration of military neutrality, during peace negotiations in the United Arab Emirates (UAE) to end the Russo-Ukrainian war. The demands were compared by former justice minister and Constitutional Court president Alexandru Tănase to the terms proposed by the Kozak memorandum.

== Background ==
=== Transnistrian War ===
The Transnistrian War followed armed clashes on a limited scale that broke out between Transnistrian separatists and Moldova as early as November 1990 at Dubăsari. Starting from 2 March 1992, there was concerted military action between Moldova and Transnistria. The fighting intensified throughout early 1992. The former Soviet 14th Guards Army entered the conflict in its final stage, opening fire against Moldovan forces; approximately 700 people were killed. Moldova has since then exercised no effective control or influence on Transnistrian authorities. A ceasefire agreement, signed on 21 July 1992, has held to the present day.

=== 1997 Moscow memorandum ===
The 1997 Moscow memorandum, was an agreement governing relations between Moldova and Transnistria aimed at solving the Transnistria conflict.

In compliance with the final clause of the memorandum, the relations between the Republic of Moldova and Transnistria shall be developed within the framework of a common state, within the borders of Moldovan SSR. The Russian Federation and Ukraine stated their readiness to become guarantors of the Transnistrian status observance, as well as of the memorandum's provisions. Chişinău and Tiraspol have decided to sustain the establishment of legal and state relations: the mutual decision coordination, inclusively regarding prerogatives delimitation and delegation, the safeguard of mutual security, the Transnistrian participation in the process of accomplishment of the foreign policy of the Republic of Moldova. The memorandum also gave Transnistria the right to independently conduct foreign economic activity, although later the memorandum provisions had widely diverging legal and political interpretations in Chişinău and Tiraspol.

== Proposal ==
The memorandum was presented in mid-November 2003 by Russia, as a detailed proposal for a united asymmetric federal Moldovan state. First published in Russian on the website of Transnistria's Ministry of Foreign Affairs, the text was promoted by a Russian politician Dmitry Kozak, a close ally of President Vladimir Putin and one of the key figures in his presidential team. For Transnistria, the memorandum presented an end to the previous Moscow policy, which assumed that the region would have equal status in federation with the rest of the country.

=== Memorandum terms ===
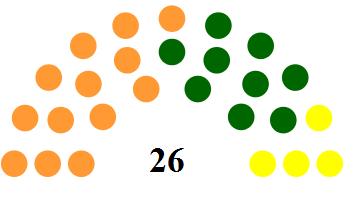
Sharing of places in the "Senatul" proposed by Kozak. 13 places for the Republic of Moldova, 9 for Transnistria, and 4 for Gagauzia, creating a symmetry of 50%.

Some of the terms of the memorandum included:

The new Federation was to be a neutral demilitarized state. Until its complete demilitarization, no more than 2000 personnel from the Russian Armed Forces were to be stationed for the transitional period, no longer than until 2020.

The government of federation was to be divided into three categories: those of the federation, those of individual subjects, and those of joint competencies. A lower house, elected by proportional representation, would pass legislation by simple majority. 13 senators were to be elected by the federal lower house, nine by Transnistria and four by Gagauzia. Laws concerning the Federation (Moldova excluding Transnistria and Gagauzia) would not need ratification by the Senate. The plan presented several issues risking causing a blockage in policy-making, as all organic laws would need the assent of the Senate, while the Senate's composition granted disproportionate representation relative to population size, as by 2004, Transnistria and Gagauzia made up only 18% of Moldova's total population, giving Transnistria effective veto power over Moldovan politics and legislation.

The subjects of the Federation had the right to secede from the Federation only in the case of the decision to accede into another state, or in connection with the complete loss of its sovereignty by the Federation. The withdrawal of the Subject of the Federation from the Federation was to be carried out on the basis of decisions taken at a national referendum of the Subject of the Federation appointed by the legislative body of the state power of the Subject of the Federation in the presence of grounds for withdrawal.

The Federation was to hold sole authority over core national matters, such as:

- Federal state property and management;
- Currency regulation and monetary emission;
- Air, rail, and water transport;
- Foreign policy, foreign trade, international treaties, and issues of war and peace;

The subjects of the Federation were to exercise authority over matters not assigned to the Federation, including:

- Regulation of foreign economic activity within their powers and using own funds;
- Establishment of their own systems of public authorities;
- Administrative legislation concerning their own authorities;
- Local self-government and related guarantees;

=== Reactions ===
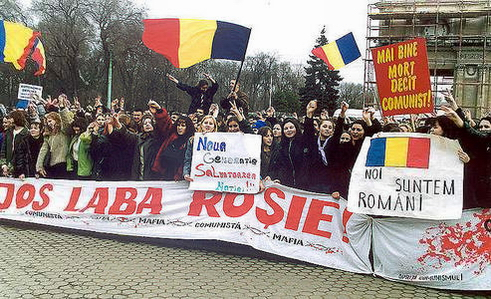
Protesters against federalization in Chișinău, holding banners with messages in Romanian such as "We are Romanians" and "Better dead than red!"

Vladimir Voronin, the president of Moldova, has initially been quoted as giving qualified support for the proposal, reportedly saying that the “Moldovan society will succeed in finding the optimal solution after studying, discussion and improvement of this document”. However, later in 2005, he made a statement rejecting the memorandum because of contradiction with the Moldovan constitution, which defines Moldova as a neutral state that could not allow any foreign troops on its soil, or join military alliances.

President of Transnistria, Igor Smirnov, has characterized the document as a compromise able to normalize relations between Moldova and Transnistria, further asking for a Treaty providing a Russian military deployment in Moldova for 30 years, not mentioned in the proposal.

The Moldovan public vehemently rejected the Kozak Memorandum. In the days following the publication of the Russian proposal, large demonstrations against the Kozak memorandum took place in Chișinău. Moldova's leadership declined to sign the memorandum without coordination with the European organizations.

Moldova and the Kozak memorandum was a key issue at the Organization for Security and Co-operation in Europe ministerial meeting in Maastricht in December 2003, and disagreement between Russia on the one hand, and the EU and the US on the other on Moldova, was one of the principal reasons why a final joint declaration was not adopted after the meeting.

After the failure of the signing of the Memorandum, relations between Transnistria and Moldova deteriorated Negotiations resumed only in 2005 within the framework of the regional organization GUAM on the basis of proposals submitted by the Ukrainian President Viktor Yushchenko with his Yushchenko Plan.

== Aftermath ==
On 13 November 2026, German tabloid newspaper Bild and Russian independent online publication and radio station Echo reported on alleged demands that Russia had put forth during peace negotiations in Abu Dhabi, in the United Arab Emirates (UAE), to put an end to the Russo-Ukrainian war. These purportedly went beyond Ukraine and its territory, aiming to establish "a new European security order" as Bild described. Among the demands would be the federalization of Moldova into a federal republic consisting of Moldova proper, Transnistria and Gagauzia. The latter two would be allowed to hold independence referendums if Moldova were to join the European Union (EU). According to Echo, Russia could agree to several concessions in exchange of its demands, including the withdrawal of its military forces in Transnistria, provided that Moldova adopt a status of military neutrality. Moldova had already declared permanent neutrality in 1994.

On the same day, the Moldovan government reacted to the unconfirmed reports, with Dumitru Ciorici, the government's spokesman, stating that "The more the Republic of Moldova advances towards the European Union, the more scare tactics and provocations emerge from Moscow to hinder us", stressing that the government remained committed to its reform drive and Moldova's European path. For his part, Igor Grosu, the President of the Moldovan Parliament, rejected the scenario of federalization and referred to it as an idea "pulled from oblivion" by Russia, stressing that Moldova's trajectory towards Europe had been set in stone definitively following the 2024 referendum in the country. Former Minister of Justice and Constitutional Court president Alexandru Tănase stated that the reports should cause concern in both Chișinău and Bucharest, Romania. He drew parallels between the reported demands and the Kozak memorandum, and warned that, if the information were confirmed, Moldova's future risked being negotiated by the great powers without its participation.
