= 2021 in Transnistria =

- Decades: 2000s; 2010s; 2020s
- See also: History of Transnistria; List of years in Transnistria

Events in the year 2021 in Transnistria.

== Incumbents ==
- President of Transnistria: Vadim Krasnoselsky
- Prime Minister of Transnistria: Aleksandr Martynov
- Speaker of the Supreme Council: Alexander Korshunov

== Events ==
Ongoing – COVID-19 pandemic in Transnistria

=== July–December ===
- 6 August – Government officials refused to register the Romanian-language school the Lucian Blaga High School (Romanian: Liceul Teoretic „Lucian Blaga”) at Tiraspol and forced it to cease its activities for three months, affecting the school year of the students of the school and allegedly constituting a violation of several articles of the Convention on the Rights of the Child.
- 6 December – Early voting begins for the 2021 presidential election, set on 12 December.
- 12 December – The 2021 Transnistrian presidential election takes places, re-electing Vadim Krasnoselsky for another term with 87.04% of the vote, but with a significantly lower voter turnout compared to the 2016 presidential election.

== See also ==
- 2021 in Europe
- COVID-19 pandemic in Europe
