= 2022 in Transnistria =

- Decades: 2000s; 2010s; 2020s
- See also: History of Transnistria; List of years in Transnistria

Events in the year 2022 in Transnistria.

== Incumbents ==
- President of Transnistria: Vadim Krasnoselsky
- Prime Minister of Transnistria: Aleksandr Martynov (until 30 May), Aleksandr Rozenberg (since 30 May)
- Speaker of the Supreme Council: Alexander Korshunov

== Events ==
Ongoing – COVID-19 pandemic in Transnistria

=== January ===
- 20 January – Aleksandr Rozenberg is appointed as the new Minister of Agriculture and Natural Resources.

=== April ===
- 25 April
  - 2022 Transnistria attacks: Explosions hit the headquarters of the Ministry of State Security in the capital Tiraspol, at 18:00 local time (15:00 GMT).
  - The Tiraspol Airport was attacked from the air at 23:30, possibly having been from a drone strike; two explosives had been dropped on the air base of the airport. The windows and hood of a ZIL-131 truck were damaged.
- 26 April
  - 2022 Transnistria attacks: Two explosions in the Grigoriopol transmitter were reported in Maiac, the first one at 6:40 and the second at 7:05, knocking out two radio antennas that broadcast Russian radio stations. No injuries were reported on the site and nobody has claimed responsibility.
  - A self-proclaimed "group of patriots" of the Ministry of State Security sent a document in Russian to the editorial team of the Moldovan newspaper AVA appealing to their state authorities, representatives of diplomatic missions, and to Moldovan and Ukrainian media and law enforcement institutions.
- 27 April
  - the Ministry of Internal Affairs of Transnistria reported that several drones flew over Cobasna, which is only around 2 kilometres (1.2 miles) away from the border with Ukraine, and that shots were fired at the village. The ministry claim that the drones came from Ukraine.
  - The media outlet TV PMR release a video and new information about the attack on April 25, that the bombers arrived in Tiraspol in a car from the area of Grigoriopol, after illegally crossing the border from Ukraine.

=== May ===
- 6 May – 2022 Transnistria attacks: Four explosions are reported near a former aerodrome in Vărăncău at 9:40, by at least two drones. An hour later, the incident was repeated.
- 27 May – PM Martynov is fired by President Krasnoselsky, who replaces him with Minister of Agriculture and Natural Resources Aleksandr Rozenberg.
- 30 May – Aleksandr Rozenberg officially becomes the new prime minister of Transnistria.

=== June ===
- 5 June – 2022 Transnistria attacks: Two explosives are reported to have been launched from a drone over a military reserve unit in Vladimirovca at 5:10.
- 15 June – Foreign Minister Vitaly Ignatiev held a meeting with Slovakia Ambassador to Moldova Pavol Ivan. Issues with Transnistrian imports and banking were discussed, and both agreed to maintain further communications in the future.

== See also ==
- 2022 in Europe
- COVID-19 pandemic in Europe
