= 2014 in Transnistria =

- Decades: 1990s; 2000s; 2010s; 2020s
- See also: History of Transnistria; List of years in Transnistria

Events in the year 2014 in Transnistria.

== Incumbents ==
- President of Transnistria: Yevgeny Shevchuk (until 16 December), Vadim Krasnoselsky (since 16 December)
- Prime Minister of Transnistria: Pavel Prokudin (until 17 December), Aleksandr Martynov (since 17 December)
- Speaker of the Supreme Council: Vadim Krasnoselsky (until 14 December), Alexander Shcherba (since 14 December)

== Events ==
Ongoing – Transnistria conflict

=== January–June ===
- 16 January – European Neighbourhood Policy Commissioner Štefan Füle proposes a plan to potentially unite Moldova and Transnistria economically by entering the nation into the Deep and Comprehensive Free Trade Area (DCFTA) and having it follow "all conditions necessary" to achieve the best success. The plan came as a response to a remark made by the Russian ambassador to the European Union (EU) Vladimir Chizhov on 13 January that questioned if the EU had the ability to create a solution to the Transnistria conflict.
- 11 March – Transnistrian authorities ban the holding of a rally in support of pro-Russian forces in Crimea and southeastern Ukraine.
- 15 March – Amid the annexation of the Crimean Peninsula by Russia, Ukraine seals its border with Moldova in the Transnistrian region for Russian males.
- 18 March – According to head of the parliament's press service Irina Kubanskikh, deputies of the parliament and youth organizations drafted a resolution to appeal to Russia's State Duma to draft legislation that would allow Transnistria to join the Russian Federation.
- 26 June – The village of Doroțcaia holds an open rally with the goal to join Transnistria in protest of a legal dispute which lead to 85% of the farmland in the village becoming off limits to its residents, and on the eve of the ratification of an agreement which would tie Moldova closer to the EU.

=== July–December ===
- 2 July – Russia announces plans to foster closer ties with the Transnistria after claiming that an agreement ratified by Moldova on 27 June which would tie it closer to the European Union, violated the rights of the pro-Russian people living in the state.
- 5 August – The Ministry of Foreign Affairs of Moldova unsuccessfully calls on Russia to remove the 1,500 troops and weapons they have stationed in the state.
- 21 August – The Transnistrian Republican Bank announces the introduction of new 1, 3, 5, and 10 Ruble coins made of composite materials or plastic to replace the banknotes of the same denomination in commemoration the twentieth anniversary of the currency in the state.
- 11 December – The 2016 Transnistrian presidential election concludes, electing Vadim Krasnoselsky to office, replacing President Shevchuk.

== See also ==
- 2014 in Europe
