= 2024 in Transnistria =

- Decades: 2000s; 2010s; 2020s
- See also: History of Transnistria; List of years in Transnistria

Events in the year 2024 in Transnistria.

== Incumbents ==
- President of Transnistria: Vadim Krasnoselsky
- Prime Minister of Transnistria: Aleksandr Rozenberg
- Speaker of the Supreme Council: Alexander Korshunov

== Events ==
- 28 February – Officials in the Russia-backed breakaway region of Transnistria, internationally recognised as a part of Moldova, appeal to the Russian Duma for more intervention in Transnistria amid increasing tension with the government of Moldova.
- 17 March – A drone reportedly hits a military base in Transnistria, destroying an Mi-8 helicopter.

== Deaths ==
- 11 May: Vladimir Yastrebchak, 44, politician, minister of foreign affairs (2008–2012).

== See also ==
- 2024 in Europe
