= Politics of Transnistria =

- Coat of arms of Transnistria
- Polity type: Unitary semi-presidential republic
- Constitution: Constitution of Transnistria

Legislative branch
- Name: Supreme Council
- Type: Unicameral
- Meeting place: Tiraspol, Transnistria
- Presiding officer: Alexander Shcherba, Chairman of the Supreme Council

Executive branch
- Head of state
- Title: President
- Currently: Vadim Krasnoselsky
- Appointer: Direct popular vote
- Head of government
- Title: Prime Minister
- Currently: Aleksandr Rosenberg
- Appointer: President
- Cabinet
- Name: Government of Transnistria
- Current cabinet: Martynov cabinet
- Leader: Prime Minister
- Deputy leader: First Deputy Prime Minister
- Appointer: President
- Headquarters: Tiraspol, Transnistria

The politics of Transnistria, an unrecognised de facto state situated de jure within the Republic of Moldova in Eastern Europe, take place in a framework of a semi-presidential republic, whereby the president is head of state and the prime minister is head of government. Executive power is exercised by the government. Legislative power is vested in both the government and parliament. Officially, Transnistria has a multi-party system and a unicameral parliament, called the Supreme Council. The president is elected by popular vote. The latest parliamentary elections were held in November 2025.

Political parties from Moldova do not recognize the Transnistrian government and do not participate at elections organized by it.

== Results ==
Candidate	Party	Votes	%
Vadim Krasnoselsky	Independent	113,620	87.04
Sergey Pynzar	Independent	16,914	12.96
Total		130,534	100.00
Valid votes		130,534	91.25
Invalid/blank votes		12,520	8.75
Total votes		143,054	100.00
Registered voters/turnout		405,294	35.30
Source: BalkanInsight, CEC, CEC

== Electorate ==
Data issued by Transnistrian authorities show that of the 555,500 inhabitants, a total of 394,861 were registered to vote in 2015, down 5.6% from a year earlier.

== Political freedom in Transnistria ==
There is disagreement as to whether elections in Transnistria are free and fair. Western organizations, such as the OSCE, have declared that no democratic elections can take place in the region under the present circumstances and have refused to even monitor them.

=== 2005 – 2006 elections ===
A team of Russian journalists from Moldova who covered the December 2006 election process claimed that it was "interesting that the position is not a fear of authority, with pressure from government" but that people vote voluntarily because Chișinău, the capital of Moldova, is not an appealing alternative. According to Chișinău-based Vremea, there is now a whole generation of people in Transnistria who see Moldova with a negative view.

In August 2006, one month before the referendum against reintegration in Moldova, 4 members of pro-Moldovan NGO "Dignitas" from Slobozia were brought in for questioning by Transnistrian law enforcement as part of an investigation into a bus explosion which had taken place three days earlier and which killed two people. They were released after few days in custody, no charges being made against them.

In November 2006, the Moldovan press reported that the offices of the Rîbniţa district committee of the Communist Party in Transnistria were closed by the local Transnistrian authorities. The Communist Party of Moldova condemned the act and claims it was closed under false pretenses.

=== 2000 – 2001 elections ===
Some parties and publications were banned. People's Power Party led by Supreme Soviet member Alexander Radchenko was banned in May 2001; after an appeal the ban was lifted but was reintroduced in December 2001, again the ban was lifted to be reintroduced in August 2002 and confirmed by the "Supreme Court" in December 2002.

"Power to the People" Party led by Nicolae Butchatsky was banned in February 2002.

On November 14, 2001, the Transnistrian customs service banned the distribution of the publication "Glas Naroda", as it contained Radchenko's electoral platform. Radchenko said in a press conference that "Glas Naroda" has been published outside Transnistria because all the printing houses had refused to print it after having discussed the issue with representatives of the Ministry of State Security.

Election results have been contested by some, as in 2001 in one region an undisclosed source reported that Igor Smirnov collected 103.6% of the votes. Nevertheless, some organizations, such as CIS-EMO, have participated and have called them democratic.

== Comparison between Moldova's and Transnistria's political system ==
While Transnistria has a strongly centralized political system, with the president having the right to appoint the heads of local (rayonal) administrations, in Moldova the prime minister, elected by the parliament, is the head of government and the heads of rayonal administrations are established by the rayonal councils resulted from local elections.

Both in Moldova and Transnistria the president is elected directly, by the people.

== Participation of Transnistrians at Moldovan elections ==
The number of Transnistrian holding Moldovan citizenship is disputed. According to the Moldovan government, 400,000 Transnistrians have Moldovan citizenship, which would be the majority of the population and would exceed by a wide margin the amount of self-declared ethnic Moldovans living in Transnistria. However, the 2004 Transnistrian census data puts the official number of Transnistrians with Moldovan citizenship at 107,600 people (19.4% of respondents).

Transnistria does not allow the organisation of Moldovan elections in Transnistrian territory, just like Moldova does not allow the organisation of Transnistrian elections in Moldovan territory. Polling stations were organised only in those areas of Transnistria under Moldovan government control.

Political parties from Moldova have organisations in Transnistria but refuse to participate in elections organized by the de facto Republic. They participate only in the elections of the Republic of Moldova.

In 2005 Moldovan parliamentary elections nine special polling stations were organised near the Dniester for "guest voters" coming from Transnistria who wished to vote in the Moldovan elections. Around 8000 citizens voted there, who were included in supplementary voter rolls. In those special polling stations results were: 30% for Communist Party of Moldova (compared with 46% in entire Moldova), 50% for Democratic Moldova Bloc (28.5% in entire Moldova), 8% for Christian-Democratic Party (9.1% in entire Moldova) and 6% for each Social Democratic Party and Patria-Rodina Bloc. Due to large turnout of Transnistrian voters queues were formed and some voters didn't manage to vote. As claimed by the Coalition for Free and Democratic Elections, many Transnistrian voters were not informed properly about the place of the voting and some owners of Soviet passports which don't bear the mention "citizen of Moldova" were not allowed to vote.

== See also ==
- Elections in Moldova
- Proposed Russian annexation of Transnistria
