= 2023 in Transnistria =

- Decades: 2000s; 2010s; 2020s
- See also: History of Transnistria; List of years in Transnistria

Events in the year 2023 in Transnistria.

== Incumbents ==
- President of Transnistria: Vadim Krasnoselsky
- Prime Minister of Transnistria: Aleksandr Rozenberg
- Speaker of the Supreme Council: Alexander Korshunov

== Events ==
Ongoing – COVID-19 pandemic in Transnistria

- 22 February – Russian President Vladimir Putin revokes a 2012 foreign policy decree which underpinned Moldova's sovereignty in resolving the political status of the breakaway Transnistria region. Archived through the WayBack Machine at https://web.archive.org/web/20240805040712/https://www.reuters.com/world/europe/putin-cancels-decree-underpinning-moldovas-sovereignty-separatist-conflict-2023-02-22/.
- 12 June – Moldova and Ukraine sign an agreement to build a bridge across their border over the Dniester river between Cosăuți, Moldova, and Yampil, Ukraine, bypassing Transnistria.
- 16 July – Transnistrian communist and opposition leader Oleg Khorzhan is assassinated during a stabbing attack in his office.

== Deaths ==
- 16 July: Oleg Khorzhan, 47, lawyer and politician, member of the supreme council of Transnistria (2010–2018), stabbed.

== See also ==
- 2023 in Europe
- COVID-19 pandemic in Europe
