= Stanislav Moroz =

Soviet engineer and politician

- Станислав Мороз
- Moroz in 1989

Acting Prime Minister of Transnistria
- In office 3 September 1990 – 8 December 1990
- Preceded by: Office established
- Succeeded by: Office disestablished (1991); Pyotr Stepanov (2012)

Personal details
- Born: 9 March or 9 April 1938 Rozdilna, Ukrainian SSR, or Novosavițcaia, Moldavian ASSR, Soviet Union
- Died: 2013 (aged 74 or 75)
- Profession: Engineer

Stanislav Ivanovich Moroz (Russian: Станислав Иванович Мороз; Romanian: Stanislav Ivanovici Moroz; 1938–2013) was a Soviet, later Transnistrian, engineer and politician. His early professional career was focused on Tiraspol, in what was then the eastern portion of the Moldavian SSR, integrated within the republican State Planning Committee from 1981. Moroz was a politician of both the Communist Party of the Soviet Union (CPSU) and Communist Party of Moldavia (PCM). He resigned his offices in the PCM during the 1990 standoff between the republican authorities and the Transnistrian separatists, expressing support for the separatist leader, Igor Smirnov. A longtime member of Tiraspol's city government, Moroz served as the acting Prime Minister of Transnistria from September to December 1990, and, during the dissolution of the Soviet Union, played a part in negotiating between the two sides of the Transnistria War. His political office was disestablished in 1991, upon which he withdrew from public life.

== Biography ==
Moroz was born on either 9 March or 9 April 1938. The place of his birth is variously given as either Rozdilna, in the Ukrainian SSR, or Novosavițcaia, in what was then the Moldavian ASSR. Sources agree that he was an ethnic Ukrainian. Moroz moved into the newly established Moldavian SSR in 1946, and in 1959 graduated from a tekhnikum in Chișinău; he also served his mandatory tour of duty with the Soviet Army. He then attended the Moldavian Polytechnic Institute and graduated in 1968, afterwards becoming a design engineer. Moroz was admitted into the CPSU in 1962, and proceeded to take classes in Marxism-Leninism, graduating from the party school in 1981. He was working at a concrete plant in Chișinău as the chief engineer and head of the design bureau, then held the same positions in Tiraspol.

A key figure in construction in Tiraspol during the 1970s and 1980s, Moroz was also active in politics, serving as deputy chairman of the Tiraspol City Council (from 1975 to 1981). Upon leaving this office, he became a member of the leadership of the State Planning Committee of the Moldavian SSR. He was faced with the August 1986 earthquake, which caused heavy damage in some areas of the republic. The PCM singled him out for his lapses of judgment in coming up with a recovery plan. Moroz went on to serve as head of his department in the Central Committee of the PCM from 1987 to 2 August 1989, when he became deputy chairman of the Council of Ministers of the Moldavian SSR under Mircea Snegur.

The Soviet decline brought about a reaffirmation of sovereignty by its various constituent republics. The steps taken toward dissolving the Soviet Union created additional tension in the Moldavian SSR, specifically opposing the west, which favored a Moldavian or Romanian identity, to the more Sovietized east, for which the by-word "Transnistria" was used. In June 1990, a congress of Transnistrian PCM politicians, summoned by Smirnov, had Moroz as one of the key participants. Soviet Romanian officer Ion Costaș, who supported an integral Moldavian republic, suggests that this event was seminal in the rise of Transnistrian separatism. In July, Moroz attended the 28th Congress of the Communist Party of the Soviet Union as a "delegate of the Tiraspol Communists"—also delegated with him were Smirnov and Lyudmila Tsurkan. As the latter noted of the time, the session was heavily marked by Perestroika policies, in that the different CPSU inner-groups could debate openly, "to the point of rudeness and sometimes even boorishness". Also then, Moroz expressed frustration with the PCM's Transnistria policy, and resigned his post as deputy chairman before moving back to Tiraspol. Costaș contrarily reports that Moroz was sacked by the PCM leadership, after his public association with the Smirnov group.

As a rapporteur on the CPSU congress, Moroz called attention to what one of his subordinates defined as the central party's "many mistakes, and even obvious miscalculations, in the area of inter-ethnic relations, which have already led to bloodshed in a number of regions of the [Soviet Union]"; reacting against the emergence of Romanian nationalism in the Moldavian SSR, Moroz declared that Tiraspol was the center of a Moldavian statehood, and that locals were under "under constant psychological pressure" from the anti-communist Popular Front. His speech was not carried in the local media, though portions of it were quoted by Pravda. Moroz was named Chairman of the Tiraspol City Executive Committee of the Council of People's Deputies. In September 1990, at the Second Extraordinary Congress of Deputies of the Transnistrian Region of All Levels, the Pridnestrovian Moldavian Soviet Socialist Republic (an unrecognized breakaway state within the Moldavian SSR) was proclaimed, and Moroz was appointed acting Chairman of the Council of Ministers, effectively prime minister, while retaining his post in Tiraspol.

Moroz's ministerial position was abolished in December 1990, some weeks after the breakout of a separatist war in Transnistria. In October 1991, he served on the Moldavian–Pridnestrovian reconciliation commission at Dubăsari. Costaș, who was leading the Moldavian State Security during that crisis, contends that Moroz and the other representatives crucially obtained that the war be frozen, and that Transnistria survive into the 21st century, by requesting and obtaining that Smirnov be released from his Moldavian captivity. Moroz left his post at the Tiraspol City Executive Committee before the year's end, afterwards working at a bank. On his 60th birthday, in 1998, he received the Transnistrian Order of Honor from Smirnov, the then-President of Transnistria, for his "many years of conscientious work, high organizational and professional qualities". After his death, a memorial plaque was installed at his former residence.

== Sources ==
- Costaș, Ion (2012). Transnistria, 1989–1992: Cronica unui război "nedeclarat" [Transnistria, 1989–1992: The chronicle of a war "undeclared"]. Bucharest: RAO. ISBN 978-606-609-330-9.
