= Vitali Neagu =

Deputy Prime Minister of Transnistria
- Incumbent
- Assumed office 27 January 2026
- President: Vadim Krasnoselsky
- Prime Minister: Aleksandr Rozenberg

Minister of Internal Affairs
- In office 9 July 2021 – 27 January 2026
- President: Vadim Krasnoselsky
- Prime Minister: Aleksandr Martynov; Aleksandr Rozenberg
- Preceded by: Ruslan Mova

Personal details
- Born: 24 April 1976 (age 50) Slobozia, Moldavian SSR, Soviet Union (now Moldova)
- Education: Taras Shevchenko Transnistria State University; Russian Presidential Academy of National Economy and Public Administration

Vitali Nicolaevici Neagu (Russian: Виталий Николаевич Нягу, romanized: Vitaliy Nikolayevich Nyagu; born 24 April 1976) is a Transnistrian politician currently serving as the deputy prime minister of Transnistria since January 2026. He previously served as minister of internal affairs from 2021 to 2026. Neagu is a candidate in the 2026 Transnistrian presidential election.

== Biography ==
Vitali Nicolaevici Neagu was born on 24 April 1976 in Slobozia, Moldavian SSR, Soviet Union (now Moldova). He is a speaker of Romanian. He attended Taras Shevchenko Transnistria State University in Tiraspol, in the unrecognized breakaway state of Transnistria, where he earned a law degree. He later earned a degree in sociology of management from the Russian Presidential Academy of National Economy and Public Administration. Neagu began working with the Slobozia District prosecutor's office in 1997. He became a senior prosecutor for the Transnistrian Prosecutor's Office in 2001 and then became head of the department for oversight of investigations and inquiries within internal affairs bodies in 2004.

Neagu was appointed a judge for the Slobozia District Court in 2006 before receiving an appointment to the Supreme Court of Transnistria later that year. In 2008, he became a legal counsel for Sheriff, the leading company in Transnistria, where he worked until 2012. He also became a member of the Central Election Commission of Transnistria in 2010. Neagu worked as a lawyer from 2012 to 2016. He returned to the government in 2016 and became Chairman of the State Customs Committee, a position he held until 2021.

On 8 July 2021, Neagu was appointed by President Vadim Krasnoselsky to serve as minister of internal affairs, and he assumed office the following day. The following day, he was given the rank of "Major General of the Militia" by president's decree on 9 July 2021. On 10 November 2025, he was given the title of "Lieutenant General of the Militia". Neagu remained in his post of minister of internal affairs until being removed on 27 January 2026. He then assumed office as deputy prime minister of Transnistria.

In 2022, a Moldovan media organization reported on a list purportedly from a group in the Transnistrian Ministry of State Security, alleging Neagu to be a Russian military intelligence agent with the codename "Comerț".

In October 2026, Neagu launched his campaign for the 2026 Transnistrian presidential election. He had been suggested to run by the All-Transnistrian People's Forum, led by President Krasnoselsky. Neagu is viewed as the favorite to win the election.

Neagu is married and has two children. He also holds Moldovan citizenship. Neagu is a member of the Russian Orthodox Church. He has received the Primakov medal from the Imperial Orthodox Palestine Society and is the recipient of the Black Sea Cossack Host medal.
