= Women in Transnistria =

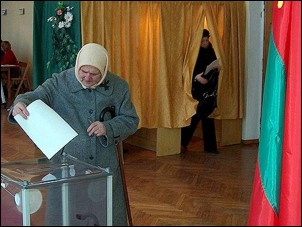
A woman voting in Transnistria in 2005.

Women in Transnistria are women who live in or are from Transnistria (officially the Pridnestrovian Moldavian Republic, known locally as Pridnestrovie).

== Population ==
Based on the census conducted in 2004, 54% of 555,000 people are composed of women; of which 21% of those women are aged over 60 years old.

== Employment ==
Based on the census conducted in 2004, 37% of women have been employed, while 19% were unemployed. Retired women were at 35%.

== Education ==
According to the 2004 census, 50.1% of the population in Transnistria were students in the "professional and higher education" fields. 15.9% of the women have received higher education, but some may not have completed their higher education at educational institutions. 31.5% of the women received professional level education. 31.7% of the women received secondary level of education. 8.4 of the women received primary level of education.

== Women in politics ==
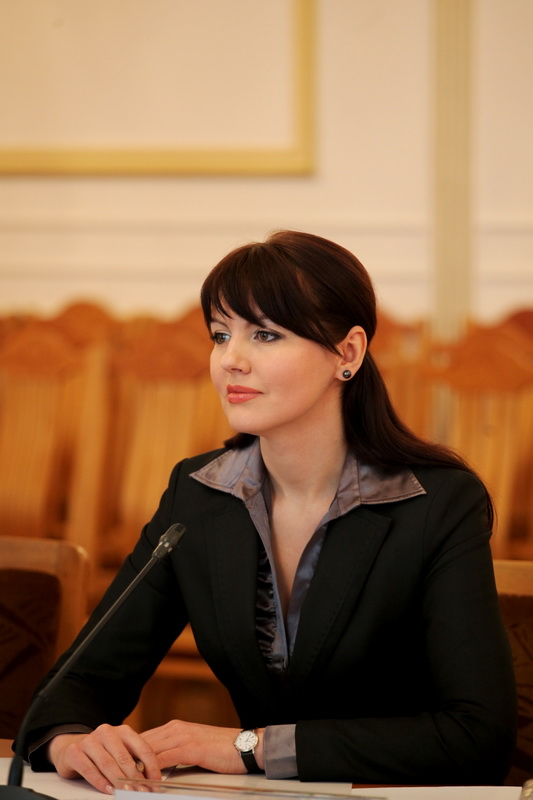
Nina Shtanski, Transnistrian Minister of Foreign Affairs

Ecaterina Arbore, an important Romanian communist activist and feminist, served as the People's Commissar for Health of the Moldavian ASSR between 1924 and 1929.

Although still a country with limited recognition internationally, and although Freedom in the World 2012 had described that "[w]omen are underrepresented in most positions of authority", the current Transnistrian government includes 8 women and 6 men. Prime Minister of Transnistria (Tatiana Turanskaya) and 3 Deputy Prime Ministers out of 4 are also women (Natalia Nikiforova, Nina Shtanski and Maya Parnas). Women are widely presented in Presidential Administration of Transnistria: both the head of Administration (Nadezhda Baranova) and all the 5 presidential advisors (Alyona Klyus, Nadezhda Zablotskaya, Natalia Garbar, Anna Yanchuk and Galina Sandutsa) are women.

Women are somewhat underrepresented as heads of State Administrations of cities and districts (raions) of Transnistria (only Rîbnița District is headed by a woman), but are widely presented on posts of deputy heads of State Administrations. Currently 2 deputies out of 5 in Tiraspol administration, 2 out of 2 in Bender administration, 2 out of 3 in Rîbnița administration, 2 out of 3 in Dubăsari administration, 2 out of 3 in Grigoriopol administration and 2 out of 2 in Camenca administration are women.

== Human trafficking ==
Some women of Transnistria, including minors, have become victims of domestic violence, human trafficking, and prostitution, which are three of the major problems in the country. Most often, trafficked Transnistrian women and girls are brought to Turkey and the United Arab Emirates.

== See also ==
- Human rights in Transnistria
- Crime in Transnistria
