= 2026 Transnistrian presidential election =

- 13 December 2026
Incumbent President
Vadim Krasnoselsky
Independent

Presidential elections are scheduled to be held in Moldova's unrecognized breakaway region of Transnistria on 13 December 2026. Incumbent president Vadim Krasnoselsky is term-limited and cannot seek re-election.

== Electoral system ==
The president of Transnistria is directly elected for a maximum of two consecutive five-year terms.

== Candidates ==
=== Declared ===
- Vitali Neagu, deputy prime minister (2026–present), minister of internal affairs of Transnistria (2021–2026)
