= TV PMR =

Public television channel

- Country: Transnistria
- Headquarters: Tiraspol

Programming
- Languages: Russian, Moldovan (Romanian), Ukrainian
- Picture format: 16:9 (SDTV); 1080i (HDTV)

Ownership
- Owner: Government of Transnistria

History
- Launched: 9 August 1992
- Former names: PMR TV (1992–2006); First Republic Channel (2006–2012)

Links
- Website: Official website

First Transnistrian, or locally First Pridnestrovian, (Note: Russian: Первый Приднестровский, romanized: Pervyy Pridnestrovskiy; Romanian: Primul Transnistrean / Primul Nistrean, Moldovan Cyrillic: Примул Нистрян; Ukrainian: Перший Придністровський, romanized: Pershyy Prydnistrovskyy.) also known as TV PMR, is a public television channel from Transnistria, an unrecognized republic internationally recognized as part of Moldova. It began broadcasting on 9 August 1992 and is available in the Moldovan (Romanian), Russian and Ukrainian languages. It was established by the Government of Transnistria and the Supreme Council to replace Moldovan media that allegedly spread "distorted facts" and "blocked the transmission of reliable information about events in the region".

A four-part program with the President of Transnistria Vadim Krasnoselsky published on TV PMR's YouTube channel in April 2024 featured subtitles in Romanian written in the Latin alphabet. According to Radio Europa Liberă Moldova, this would represent the first such time since Transnistria's secession. The reasons for this decision were unclear as Transnistria only recognizes a Moldovan language written in Cyrillic and TV PMR continued to broadcast episodes of the program Как это было ("How It Was") in this language and alphabet.
