= Ministry of Justice (Transnistria) =

The Ministry of Justice of Transnistria (Pridnestrovian Moldavian Republic) ensures the law-making activity of the President of Transnistria and executive bodies of state power by doing the following:

- Drafting legislation, bylaws, and other normative acts and conclusions in accordance with the Constitution of the Pridnestrovskaia Moldavskaia Respublika
- Examining laws and overseeing the systematization of legislation
- Organizing a system of legal services that realize the rights, freedoms and legitimate interests of citizens of Transnistria

== History ==
In 1991, the Pridnestrovskaia Moldavskaia Respublika (PMR) leadership faced the rather difficult task of preserving what was inherited from the Soviet Union in terms of economy, social sphere, education, culture, rule of law and human rights protection. The young republic needed to form a new system of public authorities and government. Thus, in May 1991, the structure of the PMR government was approved and there was an initial effort to create administrations rather than ministries. On July 24, 1991, the Edict of the President of the PMR formulated the Department of Justice.

On September 8, 1992, the Ministry of Justice of the PMR was established by the decree of the Supreme Council of the PMR on the basis of the Republican Department of Justice. It was necessary to re-staff all the organs of justice such as the people's courts, the departments of the registry office, the notary, and the bar. As of August 20, 1992, the notary's office of Dubăsari (Dubăsari District) has passed under the jurisdiction of the PMR. Notary offices were established on June 1, 1993 in the cities of Tiraspol, Bender, Grigoriopol, Rîbnița, Camenca and Slobozia. In mid-2000, the executive bodies of state power were reorganized and the PMR Cabinet of Ministers was formed. Significant changes that have occurred in all branches of public administration have also affected the justice bodies.

In 2001, on the initiative of the Ministry of Justice, the Assembly of Acts of Legislation (SAZ) of the PMR was published for the first time in the Republic. In 2003, by the decree of the President of the PMR, the Criminal Justice Department of the Ministry of Justice was reorganized into the State Service for the Execution of Sentences and Judgments, which included the Department for Execution of Judicial Decisions. It laid the groundwork for the formation of an independent structure—namely the Judicial Service Service under the Ministry of Justice. On January 1, 2008, in accordance with the Decree of the President of the PMR, the State Registration and Notariate Service was established.

The Ministry of Justice has priorities such as the enforcement of criminal penalties appointed by the courts in criminal cases, the execution of judgments in civil and administrative cases, the implementation of state registration of legal facts and the issuance of licenses, the ensuring of the protection of the rights and legal interests of citizens and legal entities in the implementation of notarial acts, and further improving the current Transnistrian legislation on the basis of its harmonization with the legislation of the Russian Federation.

== Structure ==
The ministry is structured as follows:

- Central Appartements
- State Registration Service and Notaries
- State Service for the Execution of Sentences
- State Service for Management of Documentation and Archives of PMR
- State Supervision Service of the MJ of the PMR
- Office of Forensic Expertise

== List of ministers ==
=== Republican Department of Justice ===
No.	Full name	Rank	Date of appointment	Date of release	Notes
1	Mikhail Sidorov		July 1991	December 1991	
2	Victor Korotenko		December 1991	September 1992	

=== Ministry of Justice ===
It was created on September 8, 1992 by the Decree of the Supreme Council of the PMR on the basis of the Republican Department of Justice

No.	Full name	Rank	Date of appointment	Date of release	Notes
1	Victor Korotenko		September 1992	June 1993	
2	Alexander Alimpiev		June 1993	December 1993	
3	Alexander Zenin	the highest qualifying class of the judge	December 1993	November 1994	
4	Yuri Ovsyannikov	State Counselor of Justice, I class	November 1994	August 2000	
5	Victor Balala	state counselor of justice of the II class	August 2000	October 2005	
6	Anatoly Guretsky	state counselor of justice of the II class	October 2005	October 2006	
7	Galina Urskaya	Acting State Counselor of Justice	October 2006	February 2009	
8	Sergei Stepanov	state counselor of justice of III class	April 2009	December 30, 2011	from 4 February 2009 until 5 January 2012, served as Minister of Justice
9	Maria Melnik		24 January 2012	30 January 2012	since January 5, 2012, served as Minister of Justice
10	Alexander Deli	Senior Counselor of Justice	February 29, 2012	14 November 2012	since January 30, 2012, served as Minister of Justice
11	Alena Klyus	counselor of justice	14 November 2012	February 12, 2013	Acting Minister of Justice
12	Olga Dubrovina	counselor of justice	February 12, 2013	July 24, 2013	from July 10, 2013 served as Minister of Justice
13	Alexander Kisnichan	counselor of justice	July 24, 2013	March 18, 2015	
14	Olga Vladimirovna	junior counselor of justice	March 18, 2015	December 26, 2016	
15	Alexander Shevchenko	counselor of justice	December 26, 2016	March 30, 2018	
16	Alexandra Tumba		March 30, 2018		

== See also ==
- Justice ministry
- Министерство юстиции Приднестровской Молдавской Республики [Ministry of Justice of the Pridnestrovskaia Moldavskaia Respublika]
- Politics of Transnistria
