= Government of Transnistria =

Government of Pridnestrovian Moldavian Republic
- Central government
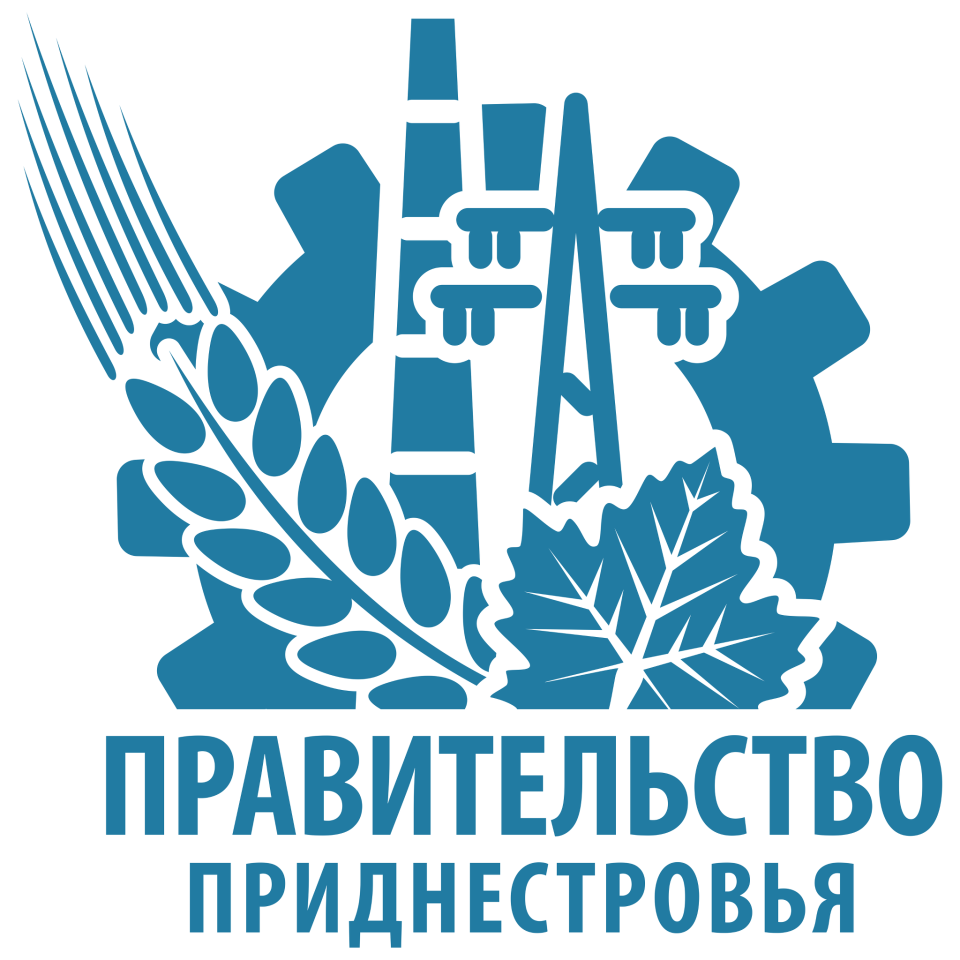
- Emblem

Overview
- State: Transnistria
- Leader: Prime Minister
- Leader Name: Aleksandr Rosenberg
- Appointed by: President
- Ministries: 8
- Headquarters: Tiraspol, Transnistria

The Government of Pridnestrovian Moldavian Republic is the political leadership of the unrecognized, but de facto independent, Pridnestrovian Moldavian Republic (PMR), commonly known in English as Transnistria.

== Executive branch ==
The institute of government and the post of Prime minister were introduced on January 1, 2012, in accordance with the amendments made to the constitution in June 2011. Until January 1, 2012, the PMR Cabinet of Ministers formed the presidential powers as the head of the executive power of the republic. The ministers were directly subordinate to the head of state. In accordance with the amendments, the supreme executive authority of the PMR becomes a government composed of the chairman of the PMR government, his deputies, ministers, and heads of state administrations of cities and regions.

The government of the PMR operates on the basis of the PMR Constitution, constitutional laws and laws of the PMR, as well as the legal acts of the President of the PMR. Based on the Constitution of the Pridnestrovian Moldavian Republic, the Government exercises the following powers:

- develops and submits to the Supreme Council of the PMR a draft republican budget and ensures its implementation;

- submits to the Supreme Council a report on the execution of the republican budget;

- submits to the Supreme Council annual reports on the results of its activities, including on issues raised by the Supreme Council;

- ensures the implementation of a unified state policy in the field of culture, science, education, health care, social welfare, ecology;

- carries out measures to ensure the defense of the country, state security, organizes the implementation of domestic and foreign policy of the state;

- takes measures to ensure the rule of law, the rights and freedoms of citizens, protect property and public order, combat crime;

- realizes other powers assigned to it by the Constitution of the Pridnestrovian Moldavian Republic, laws, decrees of the President.

== Current cabinet ==
Office	Incumbent
Prime Minister	Aleksandr Rosenberg
First Deputy Prime Minister and Minister of Finance	Tatyana Kirova
Deputy Prime Minister	Aleksey Alekseevich Tsurkan
Deputy Prime Minister and Minister of Economic Development	Sergey Anatolyevich Obolonik
Deputy Prime Minister on the issues of legal regulation and interaction with public authorities - Chief of Staff of the Government of Pridnestrovian Moldavian Republic	Stanislav Mikhaylovich Kasap
Minister of Internal Affairs	Ruslan Petrovich Mova
Minister of Defence	Oleg Obruchkov
Minister of Justice	Aleksandra Iosifovna Tumba
Minister of Foreign Affairs	Vitaly Ignatiev
Minister of Labor and Social Security	Elena Nikolaevna Kulichenko
Minister of Agriculture and Natural Resources	Efimiy Mikhaylovich Koval
Minister of Healthcare	Andrey Ivanovich Guranda
Minister of Education	Tatyana Gennadyevna Loginova

== See also ==
- Government of Moldova
- Politics of Transnistria
- Politics of Moldova
