= Pavel Prokudin =

Transnistrian politician

- Павел Прокудин
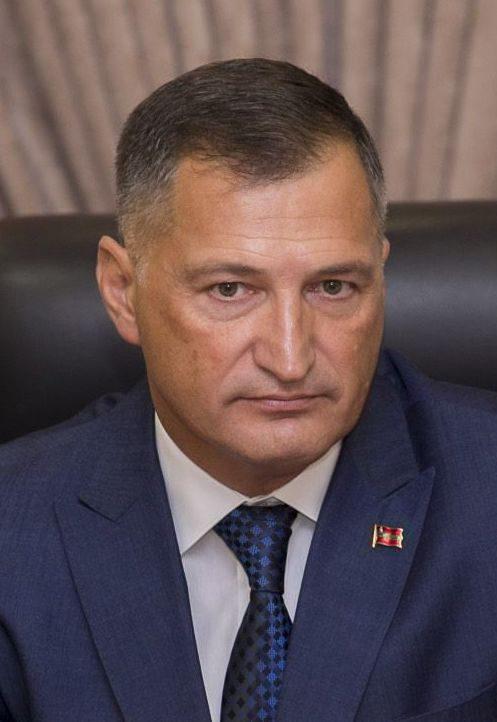
- Prokudin 2017

3rd Prime Minister of Transnistria
- In office 23 December 2015 – 17 December 2016
- President: Yevgeny Shevchuk; Vadim Krasnoselsky
- Preceded by: Maija Parnas (Acting)
- Succeeded by: Aleksandr Martynov

Personal details
- Born: 17 August 1966 (age 60) Smolensky, Russian SFSR, Soviet Union (now Russia)
- Party: Independent
- Education: Odesa National Academy

Pavel Nikolaevich Prokudin (Russian: Павел Николаевич Прокудин; Romanian: Pavel Nikolaevici Prokudin, (Note: Unofficially also with patronymic as Pavel Nicolaevici Procudin (pronounced [ˌnikolaˈe.vitʃʲ] as a Romanianization of the full former Soviet (Russian) name.) Ukrainian: Павло Миколайович Прокудін; born 17 August 1966) is a former Prime Minister of Transnistria.

== Biography ==
Prokudin was born on 17 August 1966 in the village of Smolenka, in the Novosibirsky District of the Novosibirsk Oblast. In 1988 he graduated from the Odessa National Maritime Academy, and started working at the Soviet Danube Shipping Company in 1992.

Prokudin's political career started in 1992 when he served as the head of the department for foreign economic relations for the charity of the Tiraspol Komsomol, serving in that capacity until 1994 before serving as the director of the charity until 1996.

From 1997 to 2000 he worked as the director of a Tiraspol based commercial organization and from 2000 to 2006 he was the head accountant for Akvarel LLC. From 2006 to 2015 he was the general director of the Luchafer Souvenir Factory CJSC and simultaneously he was the general director of the Bendery River Port CJSC from 2010 to 2011.

From 2011 to 2015 he served as director of the Tighina Fortress museum, and since 2014 he has served as chairman of a public organization promoting the restoration and preservation of the Fortress.

On December 23, 2015 Prokudin was named the Prime Minister for outgoing president Yevgeny Shevchuk. When the new president Vadim Krasnoselsky came to power Prokudin was removed from office for Aleksandr Martynov. On January 17, 2017, he became an adviser to Krasnoselsky, and on June 6, 2017, he was elected president of the Transnistria national football team.

== See also ==
Government of Transnistria

== Notes ==
Political offices
Preceded by Maija Parnas; Acting	Prime Minister of Transnistria; 2015–2016	Succeeded by Aleksandr Martynov
