= Pyotr Stepanov =

Prime Minister of Transnistria from 2012 to 2013

- Пётр Степанов
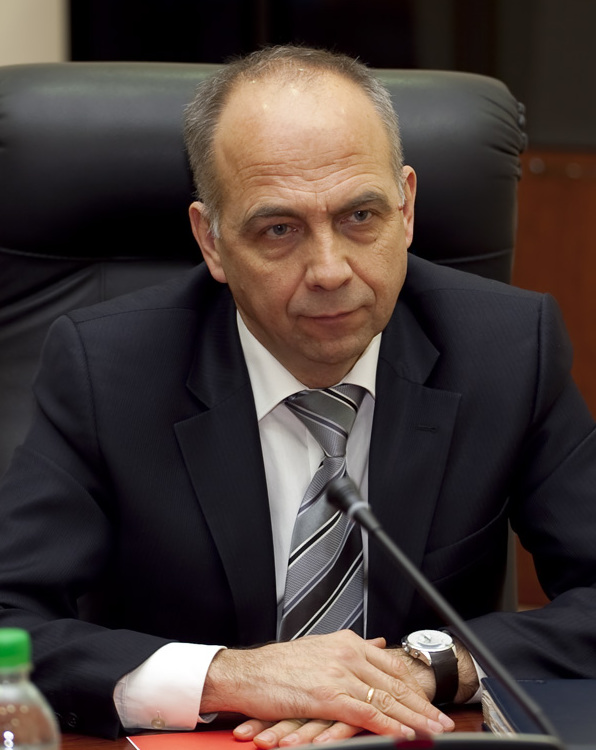
- Stepanov in 2012

1st Prime Minister of Transnistria
- In office 18 January 2012 – 10 July 2013
- President: Yevgeny Shevchuk
- Preceded by: Position established
- Succeeded by: Tatiana Turanskaya

Personal details
- Born: 2 January 1959 (age 67) Sankino, Soviet Union (now Russia)
- Party: Independent

Pyotr Petrovich Stepanov (Russian: Пётр Петрович Степанов; born 2 January 1959) is a Transnistrian politician and was the Prime Minister of Transnistria from 18 January 2012 until 10 July 2013.

Stepanov is the first ever Prime Minister of Transnisitra. His nomination was put forward by newly appointed President Yevgeny Shevchuk. The majority faction of the Renewal Party unanimously supported Stepanov's candidacy.

On 10 July 2013 Pyotr Stepanov retired and on the same day President Shevchuk proposed Deputy Prime Minister Tatiana Turanskaya as a prime ministerial candidate. After addressing several questions to Turanskaya on her vision of major goals of the new government and on changes in government's composition the Supreme Council voted for her candidacy. On 10 July Tatiana Turanskaya became second Prime Minister of Transnistria, she had been acting as prime minister since 20 June. Composition of the government remained mostly unchanged.

== Cabinet ==
Office	Incumbent
Prime Minister	Pyotr Petrovich Stepanov
Deputy Prime Minister on Social Politics	Natalia Grigorievna Nikiforova
Deputy Prime Minister and Minister of Foreign Affairs	Nina Viktorovna Shtanski
Deputy Prime Minister and Minister of Economic Development	Maija Parnas
Deputy Prime Minister	Aleksandr Vladimirovich Sviderskiy
Deputy Prime Minister on Regional Development	Tatiana Mikhailovna Turanskaya (from 19 June 2013)
Minister of Justice	Vadim Nikolayevich Krasnoselsky (acting, until 27 February 2012)
Minister of Justice	Sergei Nikolayevich Monul (from 27 February 2012)
Minister of Defence	Aleksandr Alekseevich Lukyanenko
Minister of Justice	Mariya Borisovna Melnik (until 30 January 2012)
Minister of Justice	Aleksandr Fedorovich Deli (30 January 2012 - 14 November 2012)
Minister of Justice	Alena Anatolyevna Klyus (acting, 14 November 2012 - 12 February 2013)
Minister of Justice	Olga Sergeevna Dubrovina (from 12 February 2013)
Minister of Finance	Elena Georgiyevna Girzhul
Minister of Labor and Social Security	Oksana Valerievna Bulanova
Minister of Agriculture and Natural Resources	Nikolaiy Ivanovich Nedelkov
Minister of Health Care	Vasiliy Filippovich Gumenniy
Minister of Education	Svetlana Ivanova Fadeeva
Minister of Information and Media	Yevgeny Vladislavovich Zubov
Minister of State Security	Vladislav Aleksandrovich Finagin
Head of Customs	Gennadiy Yurevich Kuzmich

Political offices
Preceded by Position established	Prime Minister of Transnistria; 2012–2013	Succeeded by Tatiana Turanskaya
