= Viktor Balala =

Transnistrian politician (born 1961)

Viktor Alekseevich Balala
- Виктор Алексеевич Балала

Minister of Justice
- In office 2000–2005

Personal details
- Born: 1960 (age 64–65) Vinnytsia, Vinnytsia Oblast, Ukrainian SSR (now Ukraine)

Viktor Alekseevich Balala (Russian: Виктор Алексеевич Балала, born in 1960 in Vinnytsia, Vinnytsia Oblast, Ukrainian SSR, Soviet Union, now Ukraine) is a former Minister of Justice of Transnistria.

== Biography ==
Balala studied law in Russia and is a lawyer by profession. He was a member of the Supreme Soviet of Russia. He stepped down in October 2005 amid rumors of corruption when Anatoliy Guretskiy was named to the post.
