= Anatoliy Guretskiy =

Transnistrian politician (born 1955)

Anatoliy Anatolievich Guretskiy (Russian: Анатолий Анатольевич Гурецкий) (born 18 March 1955 in Grigoriopol District, Moldavian SSR, Soviet Union) was the Minister of Justice in Transnistria from 2005 until 2009.

He took over on 1 November 2005 from Viktor Alekseevich Balala. Guretskiy is a lawyer and a native-born Transnistrian from a village near Grigoriopol. Guretskiy was replaced by Sergei Mikhailovich Stepanov on 22 April 2009.

Political offices
Preceded by Viktor Balala	Minister of Justice of Transnistria; 2005–2009	Succeeded by Sergei Mikhailovich Stepanov
