= Transnistria national football team =

Unofficial national football team representing the unrecognised Transnistria

Transnistria
- Association: Transnistria Football Federation
- Confederation: None
- Home stadium: Sheriff Arena
- FIFA code: PMR
First colours	Second colours

The Transnistria national football team is the national team of Transnistria, a de facto unrecognized state in Eastern Europe. They are not affiliated with FIFA or UEFA and therefore cannot compete for the FIFA World Cup or the UEFA European Championship. Transnistria became a member of CONIFA, an umbrella association for national teams not affiliated with FIFA, in 2015, but has since left the organization.

Despite expressing interest, the national team never entered the CONIFA World Football Cup. An amateur team representing Transnistria, however, competes in the Moldovan qualifying stages for the UEFA Regions' Cup. A Transnistria veteran's national side has also played in the Dniester Cup, a mini-football tournament, against three clubs including Hapoel Bat Yam F.C. from Israel.

== Transnistria Football Federation ==
The president of the Federation is Pavel Prokudin, who has held this function since 2017.
