= Sergei Stepanov (politician) =

Transnistrian politician (born 1955)

Sergei Mikhailovich Stepanov (Russian: Серге́й Михайлович Степанов) (born 20 July 1955 in Glushkovo, Kursk Oblast, Russian SFSR) was the Minister of Justice of Transnistria from 2009 until 2012.

Stepanov graduated from the law school of Kharkiv University in 1979, after studying there since 1975. From 1973 until 1975, Stepanov served in the Soviet Army. In 1979, he was sent to the Moldavian SSR, where he worked at the prosecutor's office in Bender.

In 1988, Stepanov started work as a deputy prosecutor in the city of Tiraspol. When the Pridnestrovian Moldavian Soviet Socialist Republic was created in this city on 4 September 1990, Stepanov chose to work with the new government, and helped set up the justice system in the country, specifically in Bender in 1992. From August 1992, Stepanov was deputy prosecutor of Transnistria.

In December 2005, President Igor Smirnov appointed Stepanov First Deputy Minister of Justice, and on 22 April 2009, Stepanov replaced Anatoliy Guretskiy as Minister of Justice. He was replaced in turn after Smirnov's defeat in the 2011 election, with Mariya Borisovna Melnik.

Stepanov is married and has two adult daughters.

Political offices
Preceded by Anatoliy Guretskiy	Minister of Justice of Transnistria; 2009 – present	Succeeded by Mariya Melnik (a.i.)
