= Vasily Tishchenko =

Mayor of Slobozia, Moldova

Vasiliy Vasilievich Tishenko (born 1 August 1949) is the mayor of Slobozia and the head of the Slobozia District administration in the south of Moldova's unrecognized breakaway region of Transnistria.
