= Frunză, Transnistria =

Frunză Фрунзе (Russian) Фрунзе (Ukrainian)
- Commune
- Location within Moldova
- Coordinates: 46°49′32″N 29°53′8″E
- Country (de jure): Moldova
- Country (de facto): Transnistria (Note: Transnistria's political status is disputed. It considers itself to be an independent state, but this is not recognised by any UN member state. The Moldovan government and the international community consider Transnistria a part of Moldova's territory.)
- Elevation: 119 m (390 ft)
- Time zone: UTC+2 (EET)
  - Summer (DST): UTC+3 (EEST)

Frunză (Moldovan Cyrillic: Фрунзэ; Russian and Ukrainian: Фрунзе, romanized: Frunze) is a commune in the Slobozia District of Transnistria, Moldova. It is composed of seven villages: Andriașevca Nouă, Andriașevca Veche, Frunză, Novocotovsc, Priozernoe, Uiutnoe and Novosavițcaia station. It has since 1990 been administered as a part of the breakaway Transnistrian Moldovan Republic.

According to the 2004 census, the population of the village was 2,751 inhabitants, of which 953 (34.64%) Moldovans, 893 (32.46%) Ukrainians and 747 (27.15%) Russians.

In Romanian	In Russian	In Ukrainian
Andriașevca Nouă	Новая Андрияшевка	Нова Андріяшівка
Andriașevca Veche	Старая Андрияшевка	Стара Андріяшівка
Frunză	Фрунзе	Фрунзе
Novocotovsc	Ново-Котовск	Ново-Котовськ
Priozernoe	Приозерное	Приозерне
Uiutnoe	Уютное	Уютне
Novosavițcaia	Станция Новосавицкая	Станція Новосавицька

== Notable people ==
- Pavel Tcacenco (?–1926), communist activist
