= Glushkovo =

Glushkovo (Russian: Глушково) is the name of several inhabited localities in Russia.

Urban localities

- Glushkovo, Glushkovsky District, Kursk Oblast, a work settlement in Glushkovsky District of Kursk Oblast

Rural localities

- Glushkovo, Kaliningrad Oblast, a settlement in Kamensky Rural Okrug of Chernyakhovsky District of Kaliningrad Oblast
- Glushkovo, Krasnoyarsk Krai, a village in Balakhtonsky Selsoviet of Kozulsky District of Krasnoyarsk Krai
- Glushkovo, Kulbakinsky Selsoviet, Glushkovsky District, Kursk Oblast, a station settlement in Kulbakinsky Selsoviet of Glushkovsky District of Kursk Oblast
- Glushkovo, Republic of Mordovia, a selo in Glushkovsky Selsoviet of Kadoshkinsky District of the Republic of Mordovia
- Glushkovo, Nizhny Novgorod Oblast, a village in Bolsherudkinsky Selsoviet of Sharangsky District of Nizhny Novgorod Oblast
- Glushkovo, Kholm-Zhirkovsky District, Smolensk Oblast, a village in Nakhimovskoye Rural Settlement of Kholm-Zhirkovsky District of Smolensk Oblast
- Glushkovo (selo), Ponyatovskoye Rural Settlement, Shumyachsky District, Smolensk Oblast, a selo in Ponyatovskoye Rural Settlement of Shumyachsky District of Smolensk Oblast
- Glushkovo (village), Ponyatovskoye Rural Settlement, Shumyachsky District, Smolensk Oblast, a village in Ponyatovskoye Rural Settlement of Shumyachsky District of Smolensk Oblast
- Glushkovo, Vologda Oblast, a village in Glushkovsky Selsoviet of Belozersky District of Vologda Oblast
