= Constitution of Transnistria =

Fundamental law of Transnistria

The current Constitution of the Pridnestrovian Moldavian Republic was approved by national referendum on 24 December 1995, and signed into law by the President of Transnistria on 17 January 1996. As part of the territory's move towards market based reforms, it was modified on 30 June 2000.

The constitution provides for a separation of powers between judicial, legislative, and executive branches. It names Russian, Ukrainian and Moldavian as the three official languages of the republic, grants religious freedom, and grants every citizen freedom of speech and the right to property. It further establishes Transnistria as an independent sovereign country with a multiparty democracy and a market economy.

In 2009, president Igor Smirnov appointed a constitutional commission, which has proposed some controversial constitutional changes. The stated purpose of the new constitution is to harmonize Transnistrian legislation with that of its main guarantor state, Russia. Among the proposed changes is the introduction of a bicameral legislature (of which the lower house is to be elected and the upper house to be appointed) and the abolition of elections for rural administrations. An official draft was published on 11 September 2009. Smirnov sent the draft to parliament on 23 October. A referendum was planned for 24 January 2010, but the proposal failed in parliament on 18 November. The draft is now to be amended once more.

In June 2011, the parliament adopted, and in July, the president signed the new amendments, abolishing the post of Vice President and establishing the post of Prime Minister.

== See also ==
- Politics of Transnistria
