= 2021 Transnistrian presidential election =

Presidential election

- 12 December 2021
- Turnout: 35.30% (▼24.8pp)
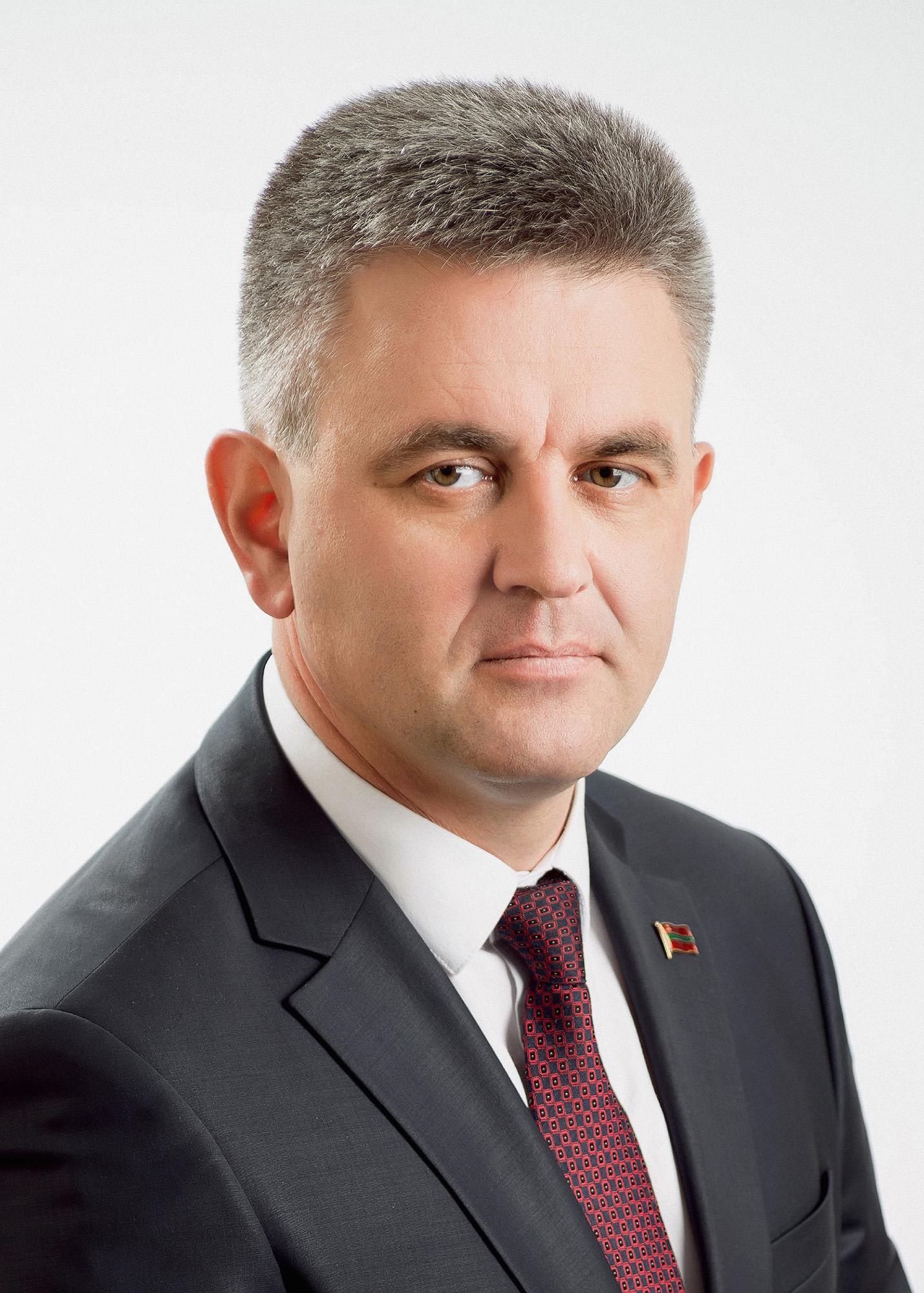

Nominee	Vadim Krasnoselsky	Sergey Pynzar
Party	Independent	Independent
Popular vote	113,620	16,914
Percentage	87.04%	12.96%
President before election
Vadim Krasnoselsky
Independent
Elected President
Vadim Krasnoselsky
Independent

Presidential elections were held in Transnistria on 12 December 2021 with early voting starting on 6 December 2021. Two candidates were able to register to participate in the elections — incumbent president Vadim Krasnoselsky, and Sergey Pynzar, who came in second in 2016.

President Vadim Krasnoselsky was reelected with a margin so important that the results, that were expected to be announced the following day on 13 December 2021, were announced in the evening. Voter turnout was very low, but not low enough to invalidate the results of the election.

== Candidates ==
Vadim Krasnoselsky, winner of the 2016 election and incumbent president, ran for re-election. He was opposed by Sergey Pynzar, a farmer and lawmaker of the Grigoriopol district legislature.

== Conduct ==
Only election observers from Russia monitored the election. Moldova requested that other nations not observe the elections because it might legitimize Transnistria's disputed status.

Measures to facilitate voter turnout were taken following the very poor turnout to the September 2021 Russian legislative elections in which two-thirds of Tranistrian citizens had the right to vote, as they hold Russian passports. Early voting was put in place on election week.

The elections were criticized due to Krasnoselsky's main competitors not being allowed to participate. According to Freedom House "Formally, opposition parties are allowed to operate. However, owing to government repression, opposition candidates and parties have few realistic opportunities to gain power through elections... Opposition candidates were prevented from contesting the December 2021 presidential election, which Krasnoselsky won by a wide margin amid low turnout." There were also allegations of electoral fraud.

== Results ==
Turnout was significantly lower than in the 2016 elections. However, the 25% threshold below which elections are not deemed valid was thus averted. There was a significant increase in the number and percentage of invalid votes, from 4,682 (1.92%) in the 2016 presidential elections to 12,520 (8.75%) in 2021.

Candidate	Party	Votes	%
Vadim Krasnoselsky	Independent	113,620	87.04
Sergey Pynzar	Independent	16,914	12.96
Total		130,534	100.00
Valid votes		130,534	91.25
Invalid/blank votes		12,520	8.75
Total votes		143,054	100.00
Registered voters/turnout		405,294	35.30
Source: BalkanInsight, CEC, CEC

== International reactions ==
- Romania – The Ministry of Foreign Affairs of Romania declared that it did not recognize the elections in Transnistria and that it supported a long-lasting and peaceful resolution of the Transnistria conflict and Moldova's territorial integrity.
