= Sergey Pynzar =

Transnistrian lawmaker

- Serghei Pînzari (Romanian); Сергей Пынзарь (Russian)

Deputy of the District Council of Grigoriopol

Personal details
- Born: c. 1973 (age 52–53) Hîrtop, Moldavian SSR, Soviet Union
- Occupation: Politician

Sergey Nikolayevich Pynzar (Russian: Сергей Николаевич Пынзарь; born c. 1973) is a Transnistrian lawmaker of the Grigoriopol District legislature.

He ran against President Vadim Krasnoselsky in the 2021 Transnistrian election and received 12.96% of the vote.
