= Tatiana Turanskaya =

Transnistrian politician (born 1972)

- Татьяна Туранская
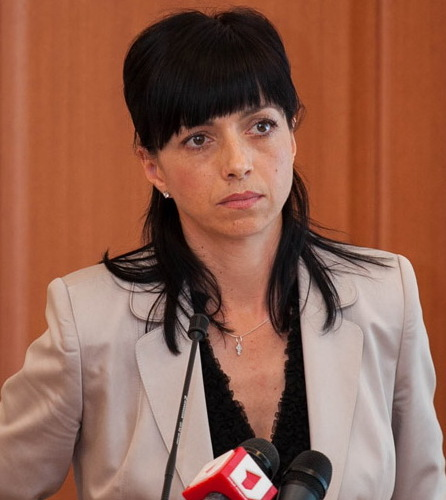
- Turanskaya in 2013

2nd Prime Minister of Transnistria
- In office 30 November 2015 – 2 December 2015
- President: Yevgeny Shevchuk
- Preceded by: Maya Parnas
- Succeeded by: Maya Parnas
- In office 10 July 2013 – 13 October 2015
- President: Yevgeny Shevchuk
- Preceded by: Pyotr Stepanov
- Succeeded by: Maya Parnas

Personal details
- Born: 20 November 1972 (age 53) Bilhorod-Dnistrovskyi, Ukrainian SSR, Soviet Union

Tatiana Mikhailovna Turanskaya (Russian: Татьяна Михайловна Туранская, Ukrainian: Тетяна Михайлівна Туранська, romanized: Tetiana Mykhailivna Turanska; born November 20, 1972) is a Transnistrian politician who served as Prime Minister of Transnistria from 2013 to 2015. Prior to her tenure as prime minister she was active in the local affairs of Rîbnița, where she rose to become head of the local government. In 2019, she and seven other women associated with President Yevgeny Shevchuk were sentenced to eight years in prison.

== Early life and education ==
Turanskaya Tatyana Mikhailovna was born in Bilhorod-Dnistrovskyi, Ukrainian Soviet Socialist Republic, Soviet Union, on 20 November 1972. She is a Ukrainian. She graduated from the Odesa National Economics University in 1995.

== Career ==
Turanskaya was a tax inspector in Rîbnița from 1999 to 2012. She was appointed as deputy head of economic issues in the local administration in Rîbnița in 2012, then as first deputy head two weeks later, acting head on 29 June, and then as head on 30 August. President Yevgeny Shevchuk appointed Turanskaya as deputy prime minister for regional development on 19 June 2013.

Prime Minister Pyotr Stepanov resigned in 2013, and Turanskaya was appointed as acting prime minister on 20 June. Shevchuk appointed her as prime minister on 10 July. Maya Parnas was selected to succeed her as prime minister on 13 October 2015.

In 2019, Turanskaya and seven other women associated with Shevchuk's government were sentenced to eight years in prison for withholding 30% of the pensions and salaries of state employees in 2015.

== Works cited ==
- "Женское окружение Шевчука получило сроки". Vedomosti. 27 May 2019. Archived from the original on 18 May 2021.
- "40-річна українка стала прем'єр-міністром Придністров'я". Television News Service. 10 July 2013. Archived from the original on 9 July 2025.
- "Исполнять обязанности Председателя Правительства ПМР будет Майя Парнас". Novostipmr. 13 October 2015. Archived from the original on 17 November 2015.
- "Правительство возглавит Татьяна Туранская". Novostipmr. 10 July 2013. Archived from the original on 5 April 2014.
- "Tatiana Turanskaya has become the new head of the Transnistrian government". Black Sea News. 11 July 2013. Archived from the original on 5 April 2014.
- Queiro, Alicia (19 November 2014). "Who belongs to the worldwide club of women leaders?". BBC. Archived from the original on 2 January 2024.

Political offices
Preceded by Pyotr Stepanov	Prime Minister of Transnistria; 2013–2015	Succeeded by Maya Parnas; Acting
