= Slobozia, Moldova =

Slobozia Слободзея
- Town
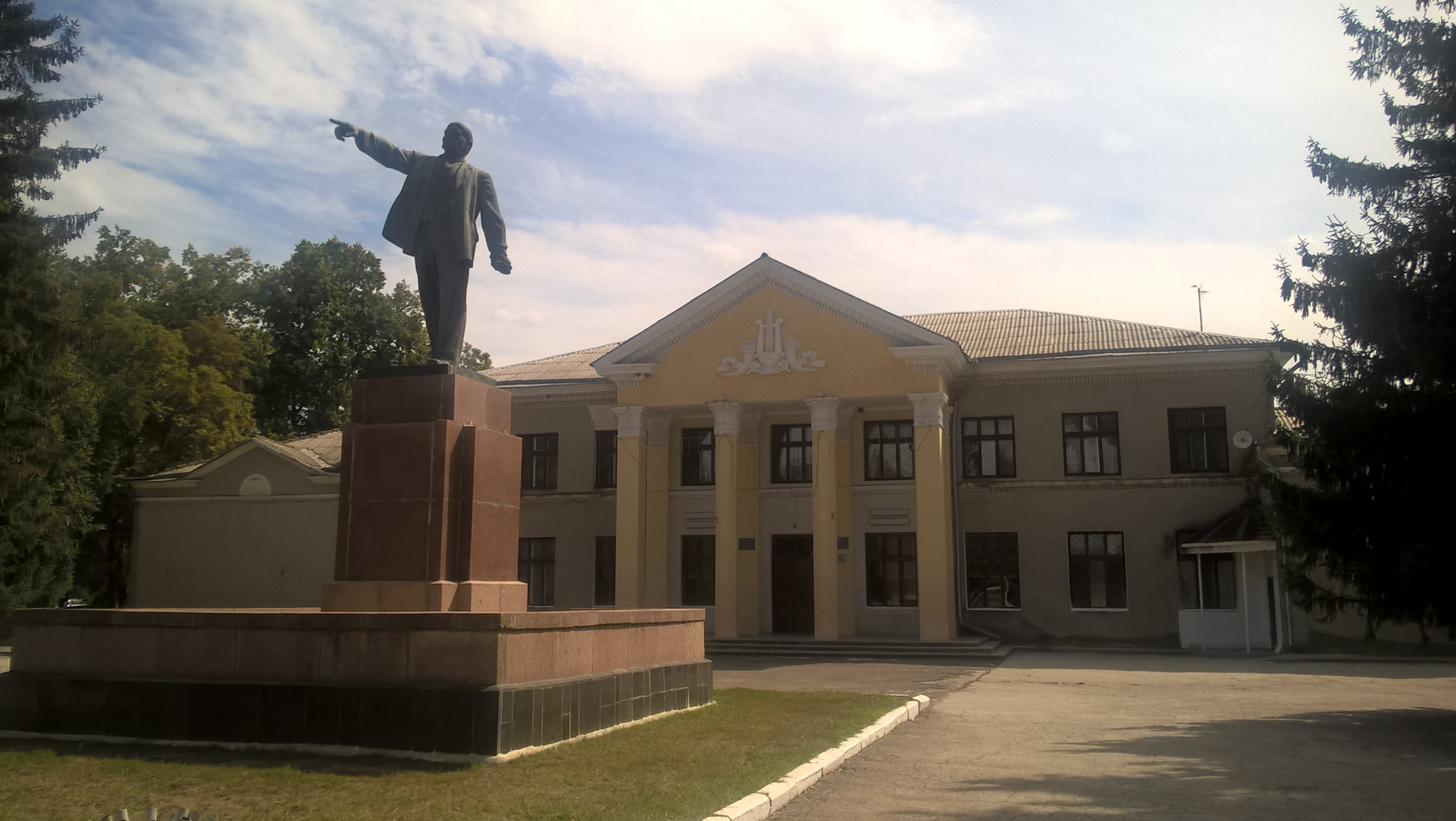

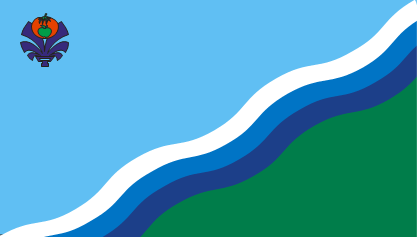
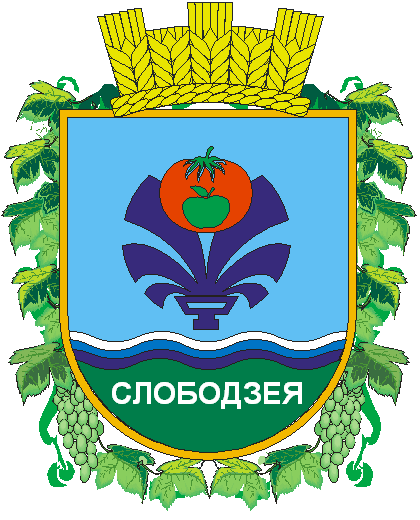
- Flag Coat of arms

- Location of Slobozia in Moldova
- Coordinates: 46°43′31″N 29°42′28″E
- Country (de jure): Moldova
- Country (de facto): Transnistria (Note: Transnistria's political status is disputed. It considers itself to be an independent state, but this is not recognised by any UN member state. The Moldovan government and the international community consider Transnistria a part of Moldova's territory.)
- District of Transnistria: Slobozia District

Government
  - Head of the State Administration of Slobodzeya: Vasily Tishchenko
- Elevation: 14 m (46 ft)

Population (2023)
  - Total: 14,137
- Website: slobodzeya.gospmr.org

Slobozia (Romanian pronunciation: [sloboˈzi.a]), also known as Slobodzeya (Russian: Слободзея; Ukrainian: Слободзея), is a city in the Republic of Moldova under the de facto control of the unrecognized Transnistria. It is the seat of the Slobozia District of Transnistria.

Slobozia is located in the southern part of Transnistria, south of Tiraspol. It had a population of 18,748 at the census in 1989, and 16,062 at the census in 2004. The population of the city is mostly made up of ethnic Moldovans (46%) and Russians (41%), while Ukrainians are an important minority (11%).

The name of the city comes from the Romanian "slobozie", meaning "a tax-free colony (village)".

== Climate ==
Slobozia has a humid continental climate (Köppen: Dfb bordering on Dfa).

Climate data for Slobozia
Month	Jan	Feb	Mar	Apr	May	Jun	Jul	Aug	Sep	Oct	Nov	Dec	Year
Daily mean °C (°F)	−2.2 (28.0)	−1.1 (30.0)	2.9 (37.2)	10.1 (50.2)	16.1 (61.0)	19.9 (67.8)	21.7 (71.1)	21.3 (70.3)	16.8 (62.2)	11.0 (51.8)	5.1 (41.2)	0.8 (33.4)	10.2 (50.3)
Average precipitation mm (inches)	35 (1.4)	35 (1.4)	29 (1.1)	34 (1.3)	46 (1.8)	65 (2.6)	63 (2.5)	41 (1.6)	42 (1.7)	26 (1.0)	37 (1.5)	38 (1.5)	491 (19.4)
Source: Climate-Data.org

== Notable people ==
- Petru Bogatu (born 1951) is a Moldovan journalist and author
- Andrei Grecul (1919–1983), Soviet Moldovan statesman, politician, and professor
- Iosif Maslennikov (born 1978), Ukrainian Orthodox bishop
- Vitali Neagu (born 1976), Moldovan separatist politician from Transnistria
- Vasily Tishchenko (born 1949), incumbent mayor
- Vladimir Țurcan (born 1954) is a Moldovan politician and former member of the Parliament of Moldova
