= Maya Parnas =

Transnistrian politician

- Майя Парнас
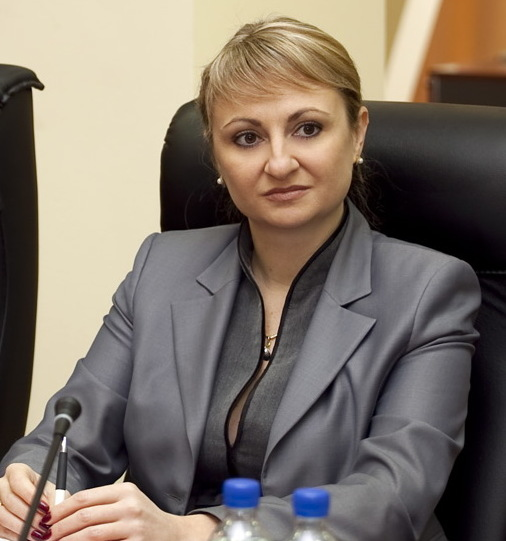
- Parnas in 2012

Prime Minister of Transnistria
- Acting; 2 December 2015 – 23 December 2015
- President: Yevgeny Shevchuk
- Preceded by: Tatiana Turanskaya
- Succeeded by: Pavel Prokudin
- Acting; 13 October 2015 – 30 November 2015
- President: Yevgeny Shevchuk
- Preceded by: Tatiana Turanskaya
- Succeeded by: Tatiana Turanskaya

Personal details
- Born: 15 May 1974 (age 52) Tiraspol, Soviet Union
- Party: Independent

Maya Ivanovna Parnas (Russian: Майя Ивановна Парнас, Romanian: Maia Parnas; born 15 May 1974) is a Transnistrian politician and was the former acting Prime Minister of Transnistria, temporarily replacing Tatiana Turanskaya, who was focusing on running in the 2015 elections.

== See also ==
- Cabinet of Transnistria

Political offices
Preceded by Tatiana Turanskaya	Prime Minister of Transnistria; Acting; 2015	Succeeded by Pavel Prokudin
