= President of Transnistria =

Highest elected official of Transnistria

President of the Pridnestrovian Moldavian Republic
Native names
- - Romanian: Președintele Republicii Moldovenești Nistrene, Moldovan Cyrillic: Президентул Републичий Молдовенешть Нистрене
  - Russian: Президент Приднестровской Молдавской Республики
  - Ukrainian: Президент Придністровської Молдавської Республіки
- Coat of arms of Transnistria

- Presidential Standard

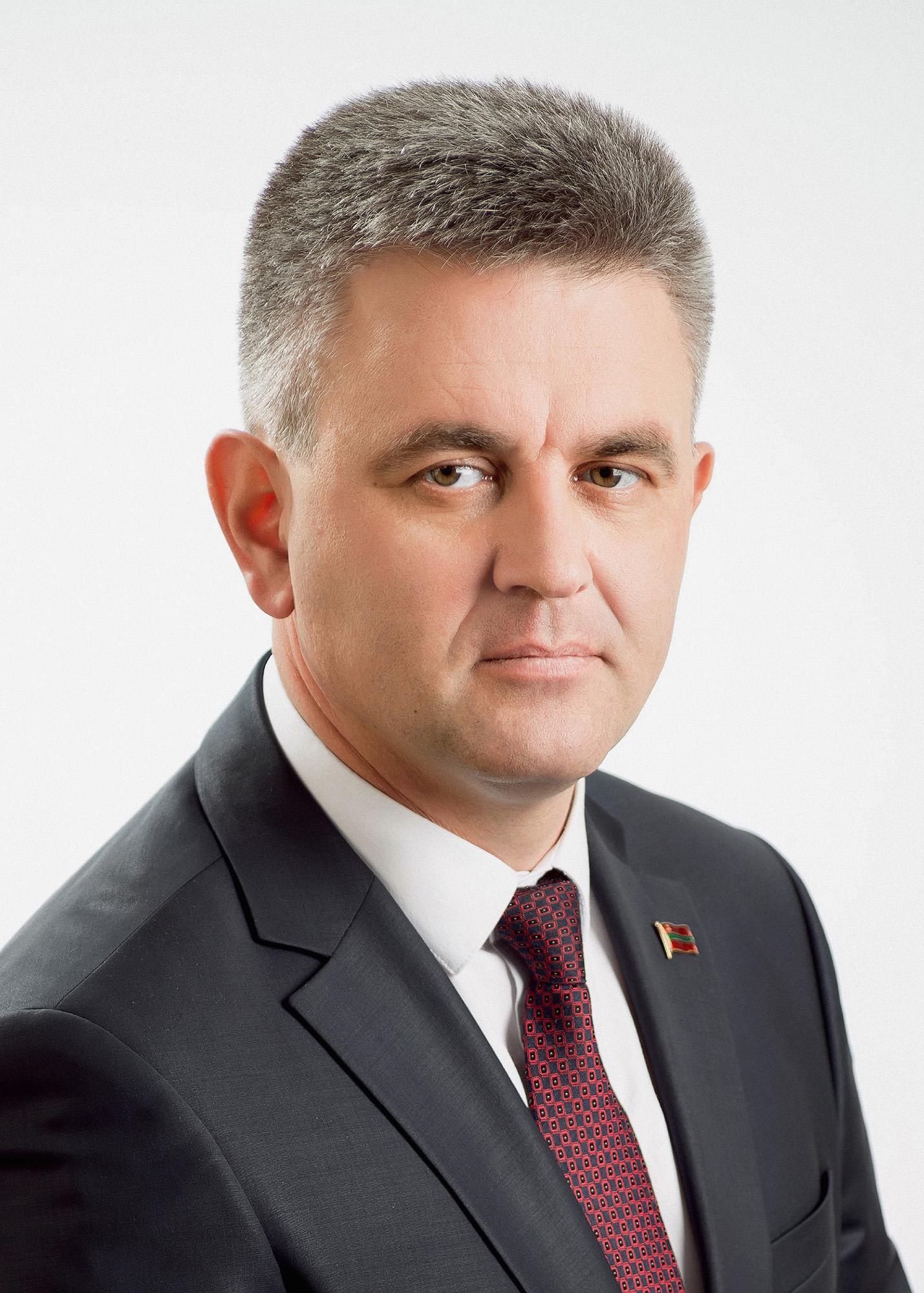
- Incumbent; Vadim Krasnoselsky since 16 December 2016
- Seat: Tiraspol
- Term length: 5 years
- Formation: 3 December 1991; 34 years ago
- First holder: Igor Smirnov
- Unofficial names: De facto leader of the Transnistrian Region
- Deputy: Prime Minister; Historical (1991–2011): Vice President
- Website: en.president.gospmr.org

The president of Transnistria, officially the president of the Pridnestrovian Moldavian Republic, is the highest elected official of Transnistria. The president of the republic is the country's head of state and is also commander in chief of its armed forces. Per the Constitution of Transnistria, he also represents the country abroad.

The president is elected by the citizens of the republic on the basis of universal, equal and direct suffrage by secret ballot for a term of five years.

The current president is Vadim Krasnoselsky, since 16 December 2016. He was elected in the 2016 election and re-elected in the 2021 election.

== Non-presidential heads of state ==
No.	Portrait	Name (Birth–Death)	Position	Term of office			Political party
No.	Portrait	Name (Birth–Death)	Position	Took office	Left office	Time in office	Political party
1		Igor Smirnov (born 1941)	Chairman of the Provisional Supreme Soviet	3 September 1990	29 November 1990	87 days	CPSU
(1)		Igor Smirnov (born 1941)	Chairman of the Republic	29 November 1990	29 August 1991	273 days	Independent
—		Andrey Manoylov (1945–1995); Acting	Chairman of the Republic	29 August 1991	1 October 1991	33 days	Independent
(1)		Igor Smirnov (born 1941)	Chairman of the Republic	1 October 1991	3 December 1991	63 days	Independent

== List of presidents of Transnistria ==
No.	Portrait	Name (Birth–Death)	Term of office			Political party	Election	Vice presidents (before 2011), Prime ministers
No.	Portrait	Name (Birth–Death)	Took office	Left office	Time in office	Political party	Election	Vice presidents (before 2011), Prime ministers
1	Igor Smirnov	Igor Smirnov (born 1941)	3 December 1991	30 December 2011	20 years, 27 days	Independent; Republic	1991; 1996; 2001; 2006	Alexandru Caraman; Sergey Leontiev; Aleksandr Korolyov
2	Yevgeny Shevchuk	Yevgeny Shevchuk (born 1968)	30 December 2011	16 December 2016	4 years, 352 days	Independent	2011	Pyotr Stepanov; Tatiana Turanskaya; Maya Parnas; Tatiana Turanskaya; Maya Parnas; Pyotr Stepanov
3	Vadim Krasnoselsky	Vadim Krasnoselsky (born 1970)	16 December 2016	Incumbent	9 years, 338 days	Independent	2016; 2021	Aleksandr Martynov; Aleksandr Rosenberg

== Latest election ==
Turnout was significantly lower than in the 2016 elections. However, the 25% threshold below which elections are not deemed valid was thus averted. There was a significant increase in the number and percentage of invalid votes, from 4,682 (1.92%) in the 2016 presidential elections to 12,520 (8.75%) in 2021.

Candidate	Party	Votes	%
Vadim Krasnoselsky	Independent	113,620	87.04
Sergey Pynzar	Independent	16,914	12.96
Total		130,534	100.00
Valid votes		130,534	91.25
Invalid/blank votes		12,520	8.75
Total votes		143,054	100.00
Registered voters/turnout		405,294	35.30
Source: BalkanInsight, CEC, CEC

== See also ==
- Politics of Transnistria
- Vice President of Transnistria
- Prime Minister of Transnistria
