= 2016 Transnistrian presidential election =

- 11 December 2016
- Turnout: 60.1%
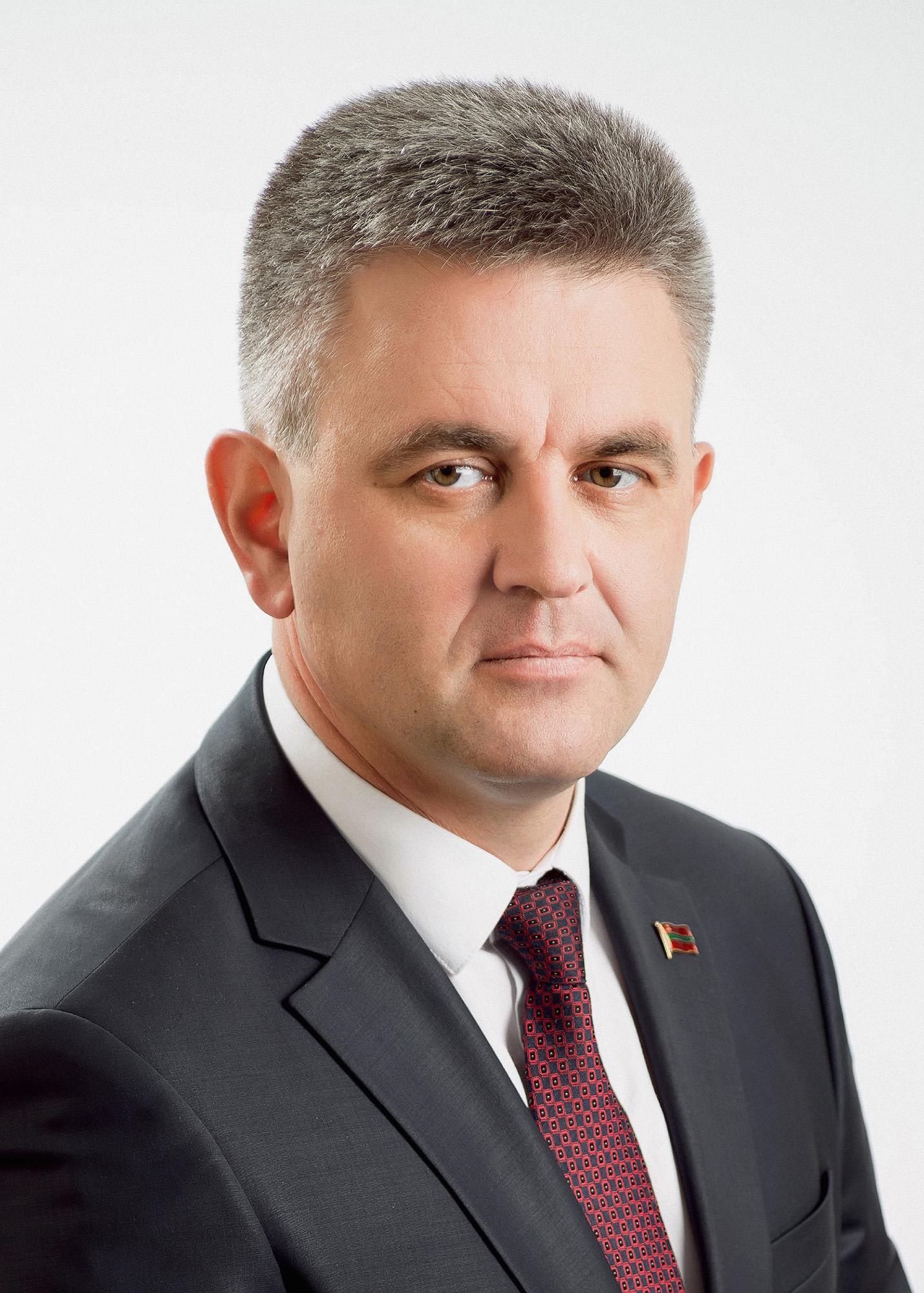

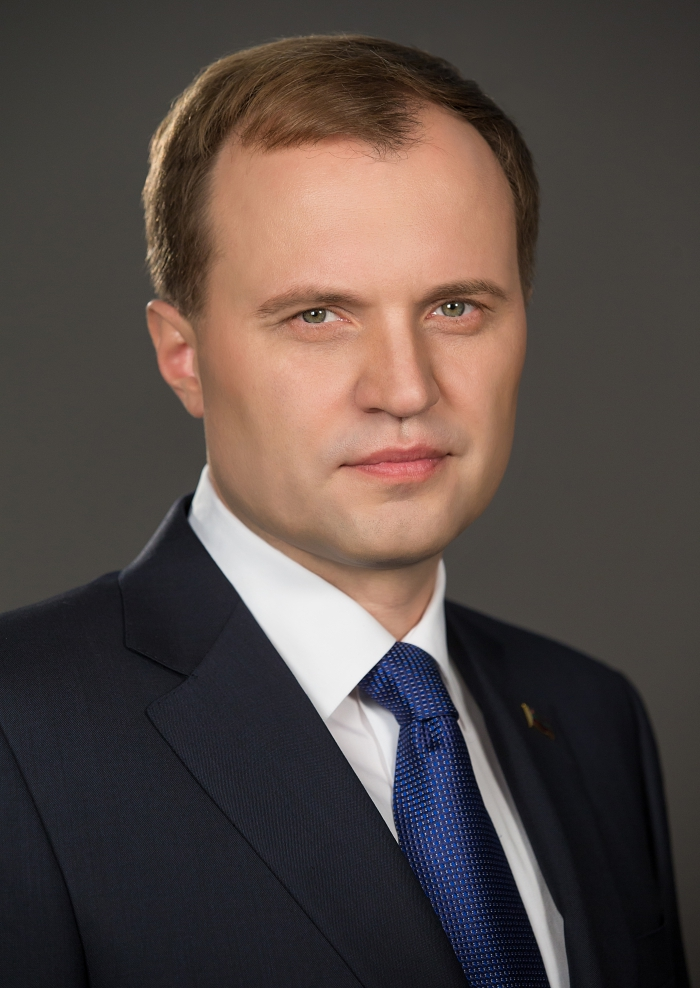
Nominee	Vadim Krasnoselsky	Yevgeny Shevchuk
Party	Independent	Independent
Popular vote	157,410	69,179
Percentage	63.52%	27.92%
President before election
Yevgeny Shevchuk
Independent
Elected President
Vadim Krasnoselsky
Independent

Presidential elections were held in Transnistria on 11 December 2016. The result was a victory for Supreme Council Speaker, Vadim Krasnoselsky, who defeated incumbent President Yevgeny Shevchuk. There were allegations of significant electoral fraud on behalf of Krasnoselsky, which might have determined who won the election.

== Candidates ==
Seven candidates registered to contest the elections. However, former Interior Minister Gennady Kuzmichev later withdrew his candidacy.

Candidate	Party	Public office experience
Alexander Deli	Independent	Prosecutor of Transnistria (2012–2016); Minister of Justice (2012)
Vladimir Grigoryev	Independent	None
Oleg Khorzhan	Communist	Member of the Supreme Council (2010–2018)
Vadim Krasnoselsky	Independent	Speaker of the Supreme Council (2015–2016); Member of the Supreme Council (2015–2016); Minister of the Interior (2007–2012)
Gennady Kuzmichev	Independent	Minister of the Interior (2013–2015)
Yevgeny Shevchuk	Independent	President of Transnistria (2011–2016); Speaker of the Supreme Council (2005–2009); Member of the Supreme Council (2000–2011)
Irina Vasilaki	Independent	None

== Opinion polls ==
According to an opinion poll conducted between 2 and 9 June, 24% indicated that they were planning to vote for Krasnoselsky and 11% for Shevchuk. In the last opinion poll before the election, made public on 23 November, 53% of those polled indicated a preference for Yevgeny Vasilyevich Shevchuk, 30% for Vadim Nikolaevich Krasnoselsky, 6% against everyone, 5% for Oleg Olegovich Khorzhan, 3% for Gennady Yuryevich Kuzmichev, 1% for Alexander Fedorovich Deli, 0.9% for Irina Nikolaevna Vasilaki and 0.4% for Vladimir Anatolyevich Grigoriev.

== Results ==
Candidate	Party	Votes	%
Vadim Krasnoselsky	Independent	157,410	63.52
Yevgeny Shevchuk	Independent	69,179	27.92
Oleg Khorzhan	Transnistrian Communist Party	8,012	3.23
Vladimir Grigoryev	Independent	1,698	0.69
Irina Vasilaki	Independent	1,526	0.62
Alexander Deli	Independent	1,379	0.56
Against all		8,593	3.47
Total		247,797	100.00
Valid votes		247,797	98.08
Invalid/blank votes		4,862	1.92
Total votes		252,659	100.00
Registered voters/turnout			60.1
Source: CIK
