= Aleksandr Martynov (Transnistrian politician) =

Transnistrian politician

- Александр Мартынов; Олександр Мартинов
- Martynov in 2019

Prime Minister of Transnistria
- In office 17 December 2016 – 30 May 2022
- President: Vadim Krasnoselsky
- Preceded by: Pavel Prokudin
- Succeeded by: Aleksandr Rosenberg

Personal details
- Born: 12 January 1981 (age 45) Tiraspol, Moldavian SSR, Soviet Union
- Party: Independent

Aleksandr Vladimirovich Martynov (Note: In this name that follows East Slavic naming customs, the patronymic is Vladimirovich and the family name is Martynov.) (Note: Russian: Александр Владимирович Мартынов; Romanian: Александр Владимировичи Мартынов, romanized: Aleksandr Vladimirovici Martînov; Ukrainian: Олександр Володимирович Мартинов, romanized: Oleksandr Volodymyrovch Martynov) (sometimes Alexandr; born 1 January 1981) is a Transnistrian politician who was the Prime Minister of Transnistria from 17 December 2016 to 30 May 2022 under the presidency of Vadim Krasnoselsky.

== Biography ==
Martynov was born on 1 January 1981. He was appointed prime minister of Transnistria on 17 December 2016. He placed the payments of pensions and salaries on the top of its agenda, along with tariffs and taxes for companies. He also promised free access to public transportation. As soon as January 2017, he announced his will to emulate the Russian economic model and favor Russian ties.

In February 2017, he managed the financial turmoil and the pressure from Moldova to invade the country and gain back the land. In July, he criticized Ukraine's and Moldova's move to establish joint custom checkpoints at the border of Transnistria. In August 2017, he asked the Russian forces not to go through Transnistria as part of the Russo-Ukrainian war.

In October 2017, he announced an 11% increase in the national industrial production.

== Notes ==
Political offices
Preceded by Pavel Prokudin	Prime Minister of Transnistria; 2016–2022	Succeeded by Aleksandr Rosenberg
