= Prime Minister of Transnistria =

Head of government

Chairman of the government of the Pridnestrovian Moldavian Republic
Native names
- - Romanian: Președintele Guvernului Republicii Moldovenești Nistrene (Moldovan Cyrillic: Прешединтеле Гувернулуй Републичий Молдовенешть Нистрене)
  - Russian: Председатель Правительства Приднестровской Молдавской Республики
  - Ukrainian: Голова уряду Придністровської Молдавської Республіки
- Coat of arms of the Pridnestrovian Moldovan Republic

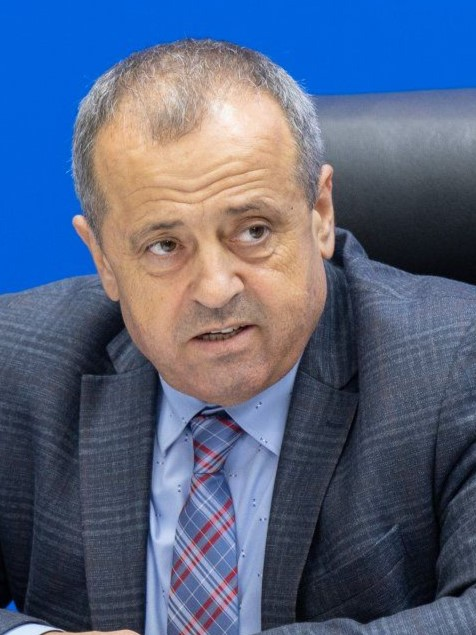
- Incumbent; Aleksandr Rosenberg since 30 May 2022
- Residence: Tiraspol
- Appointer: President
- Inaugural holder: Pyotr Stepanov
- Formation: 18 January 2012; 14 years ago
- Deputy: Deputy Prime Minister

DeThe chairman of the government of the Pridnestrovian Moldovan Republic is the head of government of the unrecognized Pridnestrovian Moldovan Republic (Transnistria), that is de jure part of Moldova.

The current prime minister is Aleksandr Rosenberg, since 30 May 2022, under the presidency of Vadim Krasnoselsky.

== History ==
From 3 September to 29 November 1990, there was a separate position of Chairman of the Government (Council of Ministers), the acting was Stanislav Moroz. After that, the office of Prime Minister was abolished. Until 2012, the head of government was the president.

The office of Prime Minister was introduced on 1 January 2012 in accordance with amendments made in June 2011 to the Constitution of the Pridnestrovian Moldovan Republic.

== List of prime ministers ==
| No. | Portrait | Name (Birth–Death) | Term of office | | | Political party | Legislature | President |
| No. | Portrait | Name (Birth–Death) | Took office | Left office | Time in office | Political party | Legislature | President |
|---|---|---|---|---|---|---|---|---|
| — | | Stanislav Moroz (1938–2013); Acting Prime Minister | 3 September 1990 | 9 December 1990 | 97 days | CPSU or OSTK | Provisional; Supreme; Soviet | Igor Smirnov (1990–1991) |
Office abolished (9 December 1990 – 18 January 2012)
| 1 | | Pyotr Stepanov (born 1959) | 18 January 2012 | 10 July 2013 | 1 year, 173 days | Independent | V (2010) | Yevgeny Shevchuk (2011–2016) |
| 2 | | Tatiana Turanskaya (born 1972) | 10 July 2013 | 13 October 2015 | 2 years, 95 days | Independent | V (2010) | Yevgeny Shevchuk (2011–2016) |
| — | | Maya Parnas (born 1974); Acting Prime Minister | 13 October 2015 | 30 November 2015 | 48 days | Independent | V (2010) | Yevgeny Shevchuk (2011–2016) |
| (2) | | Tatiana Turanskaya (born 1972) | 30 November 2015 | 2 December 2015 | 2 days | Independent | V (2010) | Yevgeny Shevchuk (2011–2016) |
| — | | Maya Parnas (born 1974); Acting Prime Minister | 2 December 2015 | 23 December 2015 | 21 days | Independent | V (2010) | Yevgeny Shevchuk (2011–2016) |
| 3 | | Pavel Prokudin (born 1966) | 23 December 2015 | 17 December 2016 | 360 days | Independent | VI (2015) | Yevgeny Shevchuk (2011–2016) |
| 4 | | Aleksandr Martynov (born 1981) | 17 December 2016 | 26 May 2022 | 5 years, 160 days | Independent | VI (2015) | Vadim Krasnoselsky (2016–present) |
| 4 | | Aleksandr Martynov (born 1981) | 17 December 2016 | 26 May 2022 | 5 years, 160 days | Independent | VII (2020) | Vadim Krasnoselsky (2016–present) |
| — | | Stanislav Kasap (born 1983); Acting Prime Minister | 26 May 2022 | 30 May 2022 | 4 days | Independent | VII (2020) | Vadim Krasnoselsky (2016–present) |
| 5 | | Aleksandr Rosenberg (born 1967) | 30 May 2022 | Incumbent | 4 years, 148 days | Independent | VII (2020) | Vadim Krasnoselsky (2016–present) |
| 5 | | Aleksandr Rosenberg (born 1967) | 30 May 2022 | Incumbent | 4 years, 148 days | Independent | VIII (2025) | Vadim Krasnoselsky (2016–present) |

== See also ==
- Politics of Transnistria
- President of Transnistria
