= Aleksandr Rozenberg =

Transnistrian politician

- Александр Розенберг; Александру Розенберг; Олександр Розенберг
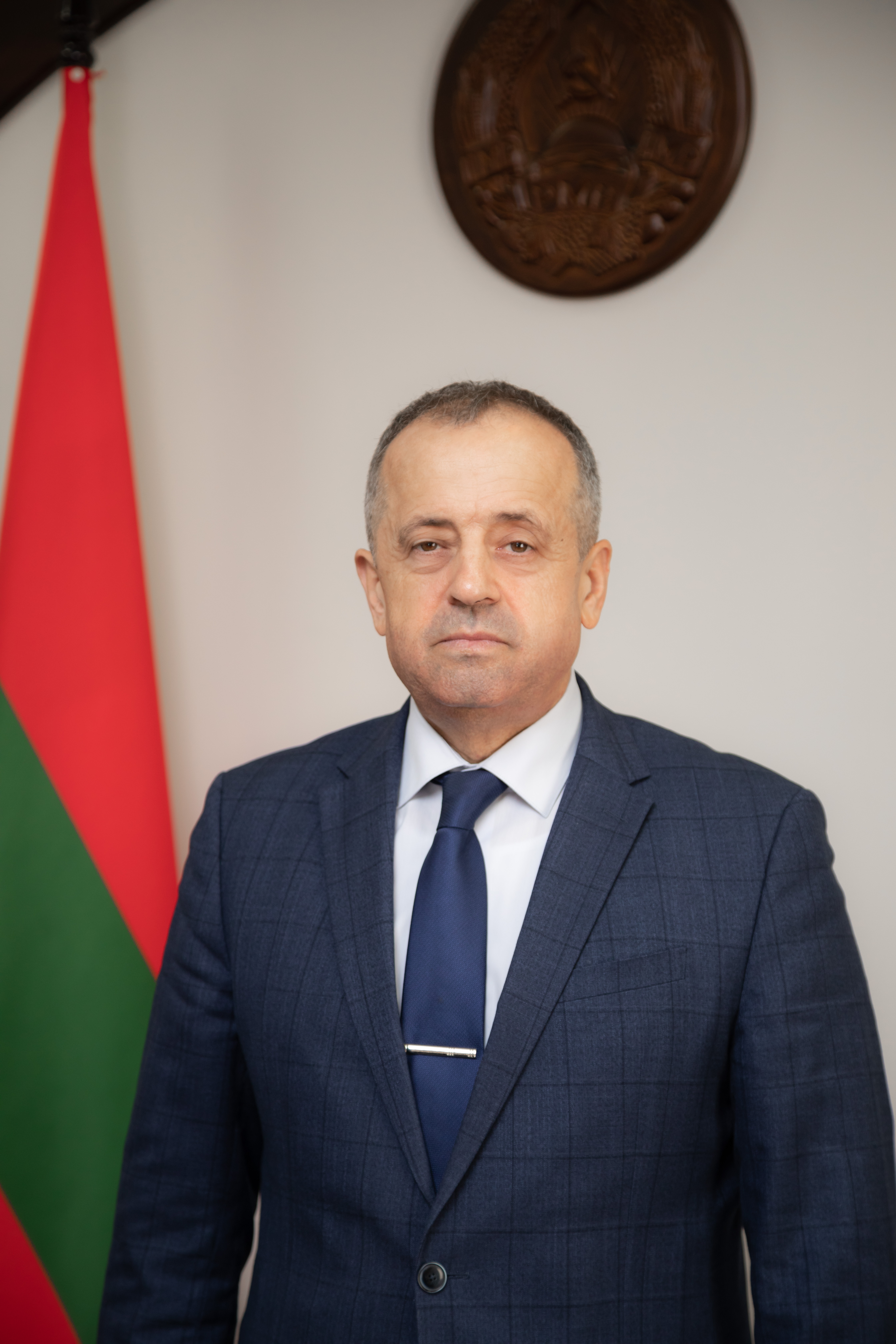
- Official portrait, 2023

Prime Minister of Transnistria
- Incumbent
- Assumed office 30 May 2022
- President: Vadim Krasnoselsky
- Preceded by: Aleksandr Martynov

Personal details
- Born: 18 October 1967 (age 59) Ladyzhyn, Ukrainian SSR, Soviet Union
- Citizenship: Transnistrian; Ukrainian

Aleksandr Nikolayevich Rozenberg (Note: In this name that follows East Slavic naming customs, the patronymic is Nikolayevich and the family name is Rozenberg.) (Note: Russian: Александр Николаевич Розенберг; Romanian: Александру Николаэ Розенберг, romanized: Alexandru Nicolae Rozenberg; Ukrainian: Олександр Миколайович Розенберг, romanized: Oleksandr Mykolaiovych Rozenberg) (born 18 October 1967) is a Transnistrian politician serving as the Prime Minister of Transnistria since 30 May 2022.

== Biography ==
Aleksandr Rozenberg was born on 18 October 1967 in Ladyzhyn, present day Ukraine, but he grew up in Grigoriopol. He is Jewish. He graduated from the Pridnestrovian Energy College in 1986 with a degree in electrical engineering and from the State Agrarian University of Moldova with a similar degree in 1994. He began his career working on a state farm in 1986, and then worked as the Minister of Agriculture and Natural Resources.

In March 2012, Rozenberg began to run a local bakery in the Transnistrian capital of Tiraspol. He later became the Transnistrian Minister of Agriculture and Natural Resources on 20 January 2022, and served until his appointment as Prime Minister of Transnistria on 27 May 2022 by president Vadim Krasnoselsky, following the resignation of Aleksandr Martynov. The appointment came into effect on 30 May.

In March 2023, Romanian senator Claudiu Târziu wrote a letter to the Ukrainian president Volodymyr Zelenskyy, demanding the withdrawal of Ukrainian citizenship for several Transnistrian figures, including Rozenberg.

== Notes ==
Political offices
Preceded by Aleksandr Martynov	Prime Minister of Transnistria; 2022–	Succeeded by incumbent
