= Vadim Krasnoselsky =

President of Transnistria since 2016

- Вадим Красносельский; Вадим Красноселски; Вадим Красносельський
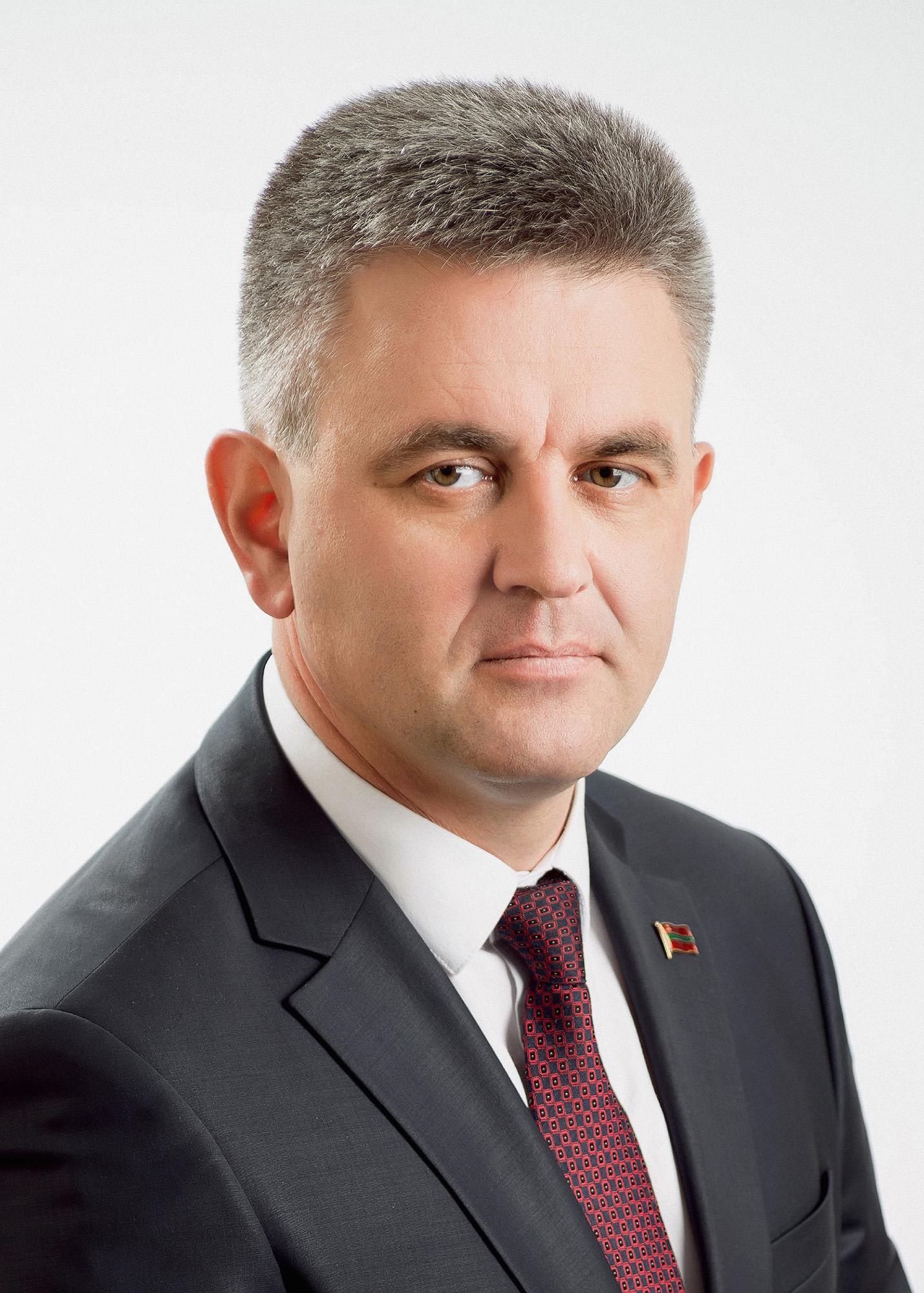
- Official portrait, 2016

3rd President of Transnistria
- Incumbent
- Assumed office 16 December 2016
- Prime Minister: Aleksandr Martynov; Aleksandr Rosenberg
- Preceded by: Yevgeny Shevchuk

Speaker of the Supreme Council
- In office 23 December 2015 – 14 December 2016
- Preceded by: Mikhail Burla
- Succeeded by: Alexander Shcherba

Member of the Supreme Council from 7th district
- In office 30 November 2015 – 14 December 2016
- Preceded by: Valery Chervonooky
- Succeeded by: Ruslan Gareev

Minister of Internal Affairs
- In office 10 January 2007 – 27 February 2012
- President: Igor Smirnov; Yevgeny Shevchuk
- Preceded by: Aleksandr Korolyov
- Succeeded by: Sergey Monul

Personal details
- Born: 14 April 1970 (age 56) Dauriya, Zabaykalsky Krai, Russian SFSR, Soviet Union
- Citizenship: Transnistria; Russia; Ukraine
- Party: Independent
- Spouse: Svetlana Krasnoselskaya (m. 1991)
- Children: 3
- Education: Shevchenko Transnistria State University; Kozhedub University of the Air Force

Military service
- Branch/service: Transnistrian Army
- Years of service: 1988–2012
- Rank: Major general

Vadim Nikolayevich Krasnoselsky (Note: In this name that follows East Slavic naming customs, the patronymic is Nikolayevich and the family name is Krasnoselsky.) (Note: Russian: Вадим Николаевич Красносельский; Romanian: Вадим Николаевич Красноселски, romanized: Vadim Nicolaevici Crasnoselschii; Ukrainian: Вадим Миколайович Красносельський, romanized: Vadym Mykolaiovych Krasnoselskyi) (born 14 April 1970) is a Transnistrian politician who is the 3rd and current president of Transnistria. Previously, he served as a member of the Supreme Council of Transnistria from the 7th district, as 6th Speaker of the Supreme Council (2015–2016) and the 7th Minister of the Interior.

== Biography ==
On 14 April 1970 Vadim Krasnoselsky was born to parents Nikolai Vasilyevich Krasnoselsky (1939–2016) and Antonina Grigorievna Krasnoselskaya (born 1945) in the village of Dauriya, in the Borzinsky district (now the Zabaykalsky District) of the Russian SFSR of the Soviet Union. This area is located in the Russian Far East near the border with Mongolia and China.

Krasnoselsky came from a military family. In 1978 his father was transferred to a military base in Bender in the Moldavian SSR. He attended High School No. 102 (now Gymnasium No. 1) in Bender, and is said to have sat at the same desk of his future wife Svetlana. As a child, Krasnoselsky is reported to have attended a music school, and took part in rowing and other sporting competitions, fulfilling the standards for the title of "Candidate for Master of Sports of the USSR".

After leaving school in 1987 Krasnoselsky started studying in Odesa, but left during his first year to join a Military Aviation Engineer Higher School in Kharkiv, from which he graduated in 1993. However, he refused to take the oath of allegiance to an independent Ukraine. He subsequently joined the Transnistrian security forces, later becoming a high-ranking official in the Ministry of the Interior.

From 1998 to 2000, Krasnoselsky was the Deputy Head of the anti-corruption department of the Bendery police force, and from 2000 to 2003, he was Deputy Head of the anti-corruption department in the central office of the Ministry of Internal Affairs of the PMR.

Vadim Krasnoselsky took his degree in law at the Transnistrian State University, graduating from the Faculty of Law in 2002. He worked for the Bender police for several years, rising through the ranks before becoming the chief of police in that city. From 10 September 2003 he was the head of the Bendery GOVD (later the Bendery Department of Internal Affairs).

In 2007, Krasnoselsky became Minister of the Interior, serving until 2012 when he started working in business, as an adviser to the Board of Directors of SZAO Interdnestrcom, where he worked for 3 years until 2015. He was elected to the Supreme Council in the 2015 elections, and was appointed as the body's Speaker.

== Presidency ==
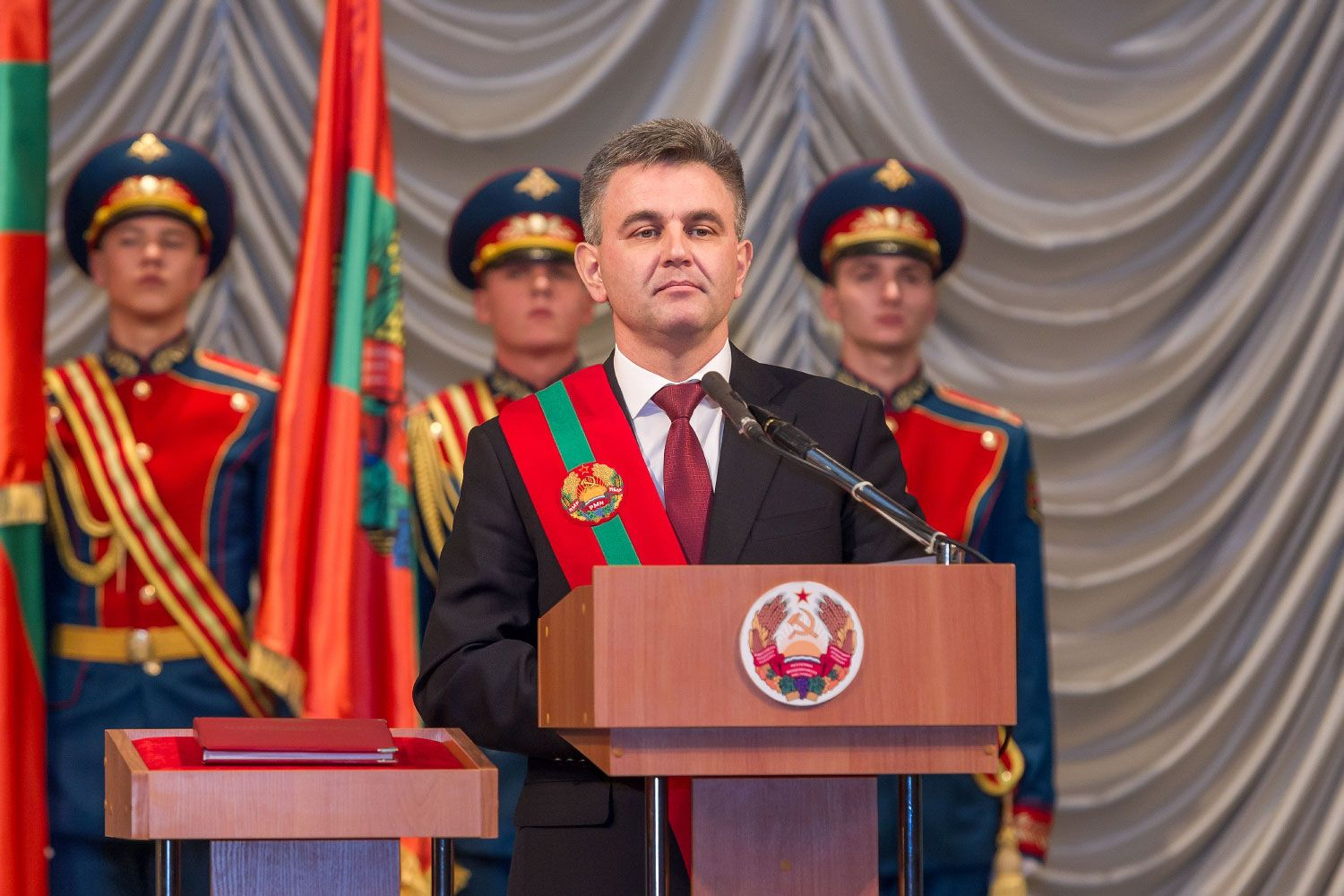
Krasnoselsky during his inauguration in 2016.

Supported by the Sheriff conglomerate, he defeated incumbent President Yevgeny Shevchuk in the 2016 presidential elections, receiving 62% of the vote. He was inaugurated on 27 December at the Nadezhda Aronetskaya State Drama Theatre. On 4 January 2017, he received newly elected Moldovan President Igor Dodon in Bender, who was the second Moldovan leader to visit the Pridnestrovian Moldavian Republic (PMR) in several years. In January 2019, he attended the opening of the PMR representative offices in Moscow, replacing the Cooperation Center "Transnistria". On 29 May, he announced the creation of an international lawsuit against Moldova in which the PMR asks for compensation for "the aggression against the people of Transnistria". In August, he attended a ceremony at the base of the Operational Group of Russian Forces with Russian Defence Minister Sergey Shoigu dedicated the 75th anniversary of the Soviet re-occupation of Moldova in the Second Jassy–Kishinev Offensive. In late October, he met with President Dodon at his presidential residence in Holercani ahead of the Bavaria Conference, scheduled for 4–5 November.

During his presidency, he revived the traditional New Year balls, in which he takes part with his spouse. In September 2017, he ordered the creation of the Tiraspol Suvorov Military School, the youth cadet school of the Armed Forces of Transnistria.

He has expressed his support for Transnistria being a part of Russia on numerous occasions.

=== Greening and urban improvement ===
Krasnoselsky pursued a policy of greening and beautification of cities, primarily through the creation of new parks, squares, and the reconstruction of existing ones. During these improvements, he also undertook the renaming of parks and areas that were previously named during the communist era, restoring them to their original pre-revolutionary names or assigning new ones inspired by Russia's imperial past or figures from that era in 2021 and 2020.

=== Military reform ===
Since 2017, a series of transformations have been implemented in the Armed Forces of Transnistria. Firstly, military service has shifted to a "workday" regime. Soldiers report for duty in the morning and leave in the evening, thereby reducing instances of hazing and unauthorized departure from military units to isolated cases. Secondly, during their army service, students from higher education institutions switch to distance learning, ensuring the continuity of the educational process. Conscripts are granted leave during exam sessions. Thirdly, there has been a technical upgrade of military units, ranging from new uniforms to the repair of existing facilities and the construction of new barracks.

=== Views and actions on the Transnistrian culture ===
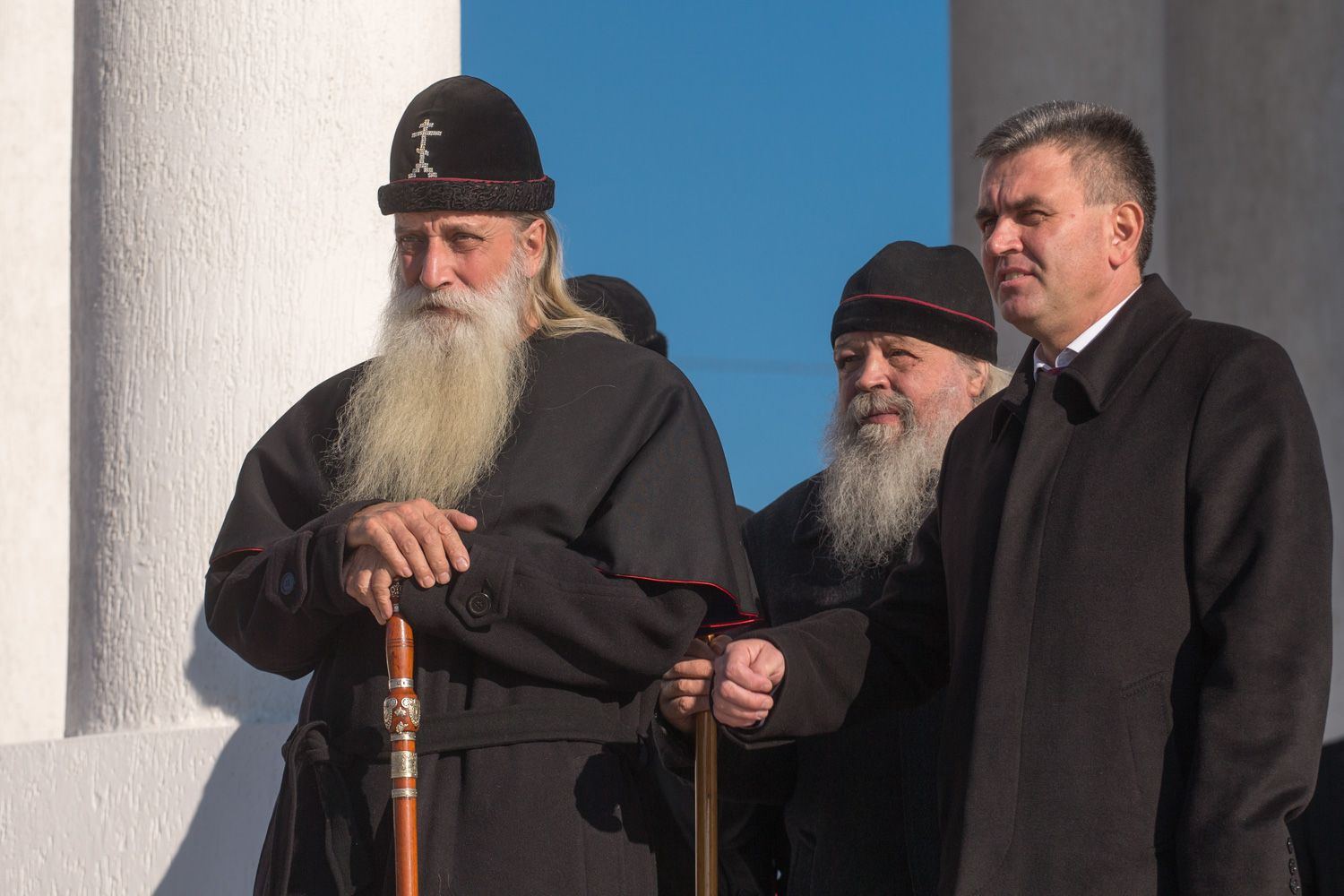
Metropolitan of Moscow and All Rus' Cornelius (Titov) (left) with Bishop Eumenius (Mikheyev) of Chișinău and all Moldova (center) and President of Transnistria Vadim Krasnoselsky (right), during the Metropolitan's visit in Transnistria

He considers the October Socialist Revolution of 1917 as a "catastrophe" and refers to the Bolsheviks as "traitors" and "usurpers." He also was one of the main supporters for the establishment of the first museum in Transnistria dedicated to the victims of political repression, and he has stated he views the policy of decossackization as "genocide based on class criteria." He adheres to the opinion that in Transnistria, the Holodomor was organized by the communists in power at the time in the region, and supported and instructed to explore the installation of a monument in Bender dedicated to the victims of Soviet repression. He also spoke positively about one of the leaders of the White Movement, Mikhail Drozdovsky, the Monarchist general who led the Iași–Don March.

Krasnoselsky has proposed raising statues of notable Imperial Russian leaders such as Emperor Alexander III, Generalissimo Alexander Suvorov and Prime Minister Pyotr Stolypin. He actively involves himself in changing the tourist image of Transnistria. He believes that Transnistria should be associated not as a "fragment of the USSR" and Soviet monuments but with positive images. For example, a monument of Vladimir Lenin in the Bender Fortress was dismantled as part of this initiative.

He has stated that he is a constitutional monarchist, going as far as to say the following during a presidential campaign:

I am a monarchist by nature. From my youth I had strictly built monarchical views. I am a supporter of monarchism, limited constitutional monarchism, and take the experience of the Russian Empire as a basis.

While still being the head of the Ministry of Internal Affairs, Vadim Krasnoselsky initiated the installation of banners featuring the image of the imperial family with the words: "Forgive us, sovereign, for our lost children." He initiated the construction of a chapel in honor of the imperial family of Nicholas II in Bender and a chapel on the site of the former Intercession Church in Tiraspol which was demolished in the Soviet era. He also sharply criticized the religious policy of the USSR.

On 13 February 2021, at the Cossack Circle, the president confirmed that even now he continues to commemorate important Imperial historical events and personalities in this way. More generally, Krasnoselsky is implementing a policy of returning the pre-revolutionary flags and emblems to Transnistrian cities. He stated that he considers Soviet symbolism to be "Irrelevant".

In 2017, at the initiative of Vadim Krasnoselsky, the annual celebration of the regimental holiday of the 55th Podolsky Infantry Regiment of the Russian Imperial Army was revived in Bender on 29 August. Traditionally, the events begin at the military memorial complex near the Church of the Unfading Savior, with the laying of flowers at the reverential cross and the rendition of the anthem "God Save the Tsar!" Following this, the participants proceeded in a procession to the monument of Russian glory, where a military parade took place. Subsequent thematic events occurred within the territory of Bender Fortress and at the Alexander Nevsky Church.

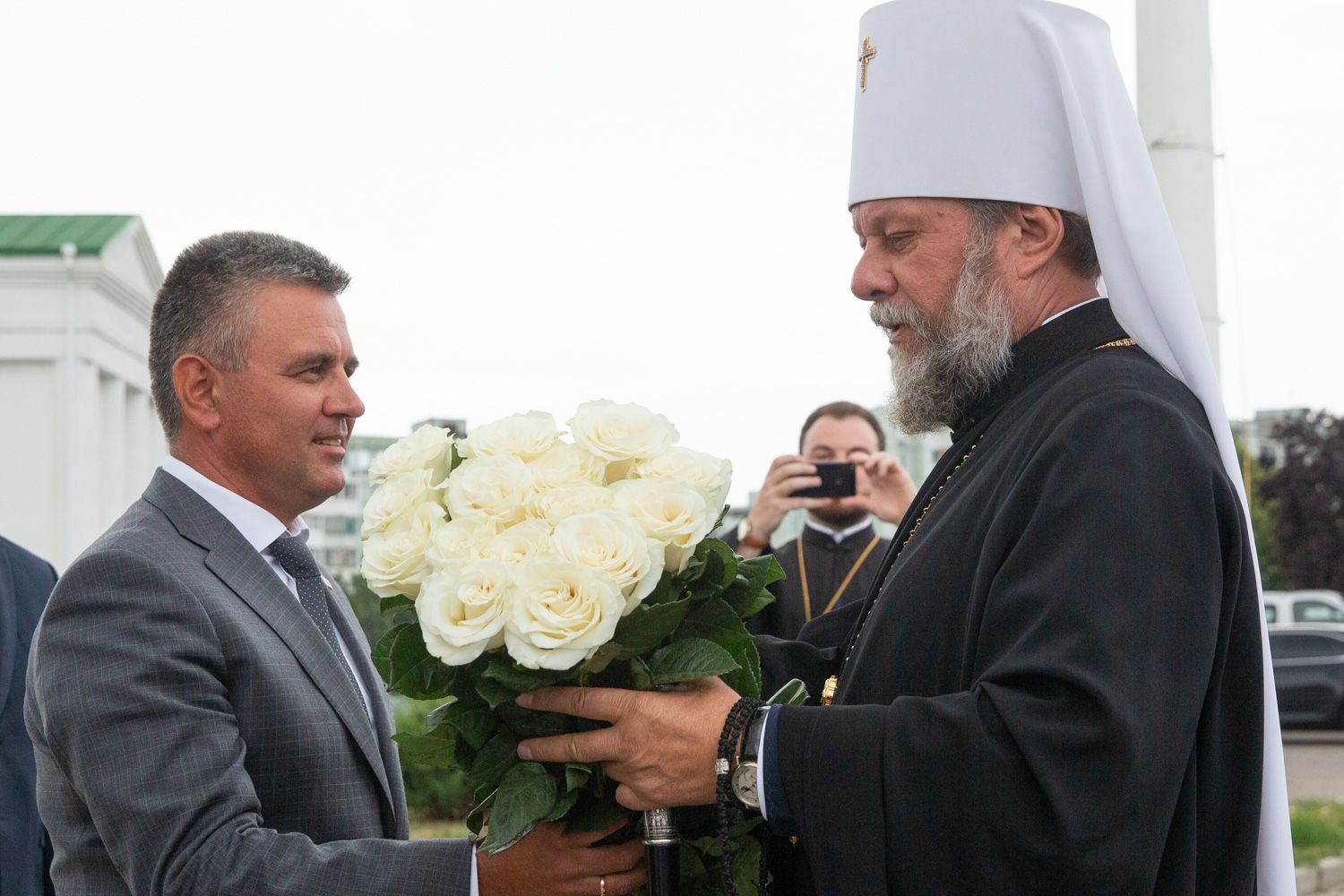
Krasnoselsky with Metropolitan Vladimir of Chișinău and All Moldova

He has stated that he supports the idea of traditional marriage being between a man and a woman.

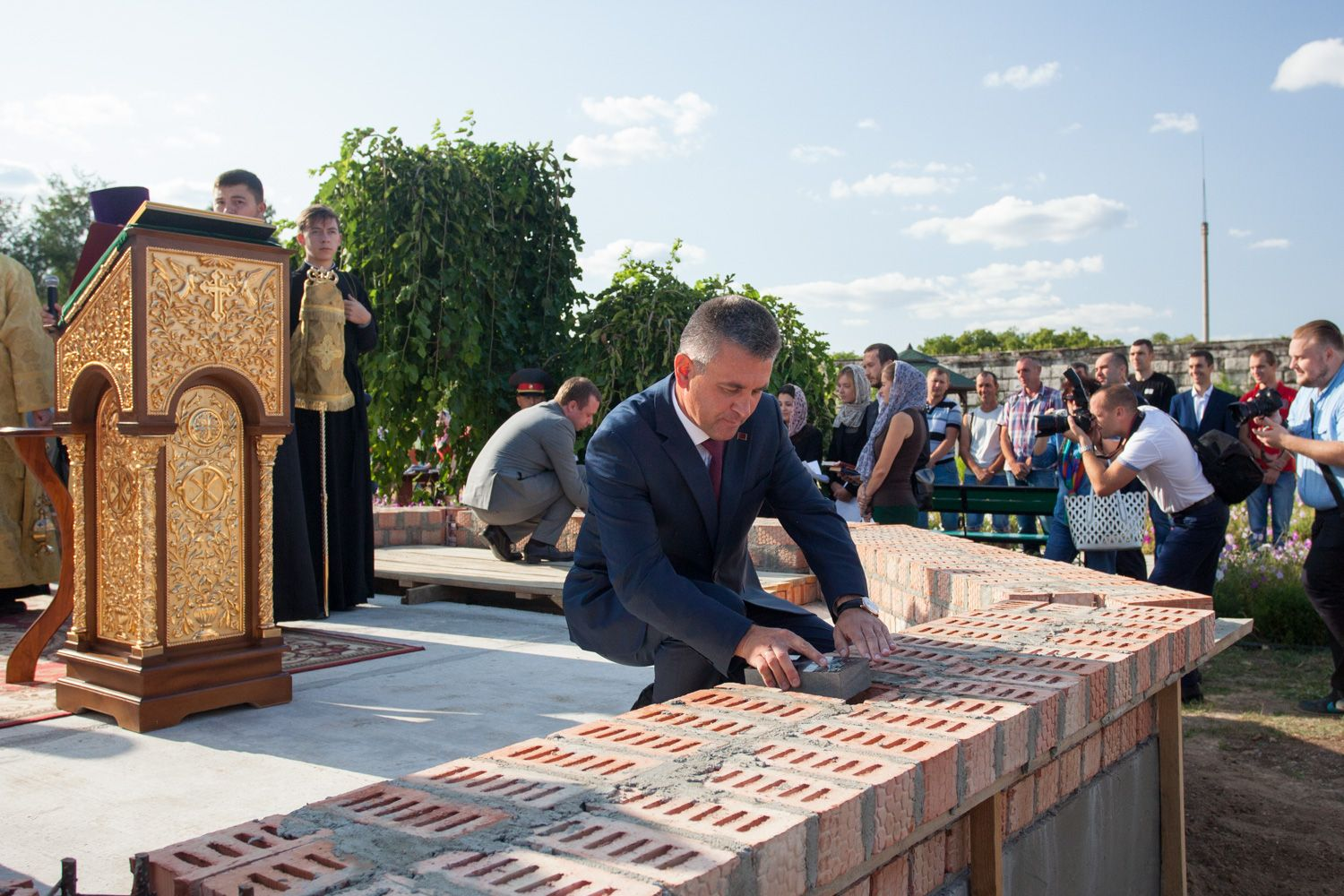
Vadim Krasnoselsky laying the foundation for a chapel in honor of the Romanov Holy Royal Martyrs.

== Controversies ==
Due to his openly monarchist and anti-communist views and policies, Krasnoselsky regularly faces criticism from the Transnistrian Communist Party and left-wing activists, as well as in the newspapers "Pridnestrovie Pravda" and "Voice of the People". The Communist Party of the Russian Federation and the Union of Communist Parties – Communist Party of the Soviet Union have also made critical statements directed at Vadim Krasnoselsky on multiple occasions. As Transnistria's Minister of the Interior in 2007, Krasnoselsky was involved in a controversial decision to remove headstones and other memorials to Romanian soldiers in a military cemetery and rededicate the cemetery solely to Soviet soldiers, although remains were not exhumed. The incident sparked controversy within Romania and Germany. Krasnoselsky also made several controversial statements regarding the Romanian soldiers. In March 2021, during the COVID-19 pandemic, Moldova gave 1,810 vaccines which were donated by Romania to Transnistria. Krasnoselsky incorrectly stated they came from the World Health Organization (WHO). He later corrected himself and thanked Romania. He was reelected in the 2021 Transnistrian presidential election. Only Russian observers from the State Duma were allowed to monitor the vote, posing questions about its legitimacy. Krasnoselsky is on a list of Transnistrian officials banned from entering the EU. In March 2023, Romanian senator Claudiu Târziu wrote a letter to the Ukrainian president Volodymyr Zelenskyy, demanding the withdrawal of Ukrainian citizenship for several Transnistrian figures, including Krasnoselsky.

== Family ==
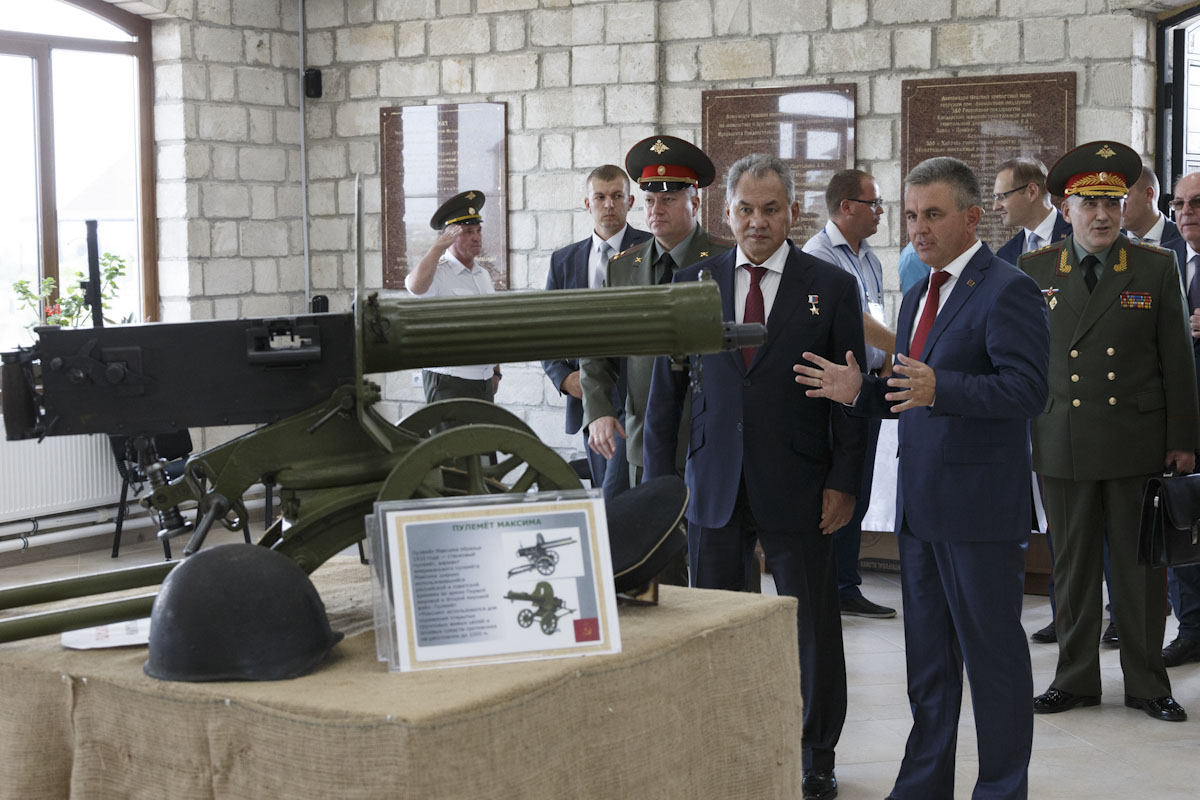
With Sergei Shoigu in August 2019

His wife, Svetlana Krasnoselskaya, is a philologist and Russian language teacher. He has one son, Ivan, and two daughters, Genevieve and Sofia.

== Notes ==
Political offices
Preceded by Aleksandr Korolyov	Minister of the Interior; 2007–2012	Succeeded by Sergey Monul
Preceded by Yevgeny Shevchuk	President of Transnistria; 2016–present	Incumbent
