= 2020 Transnistrian parliamentary election =

← 2015	29 November 2020	2025 →

All 33 seats in the Supreme Council 17 seats needed for a majority
- Registered: 410,592
- Turnout: 28.06% (▼20.29pp)
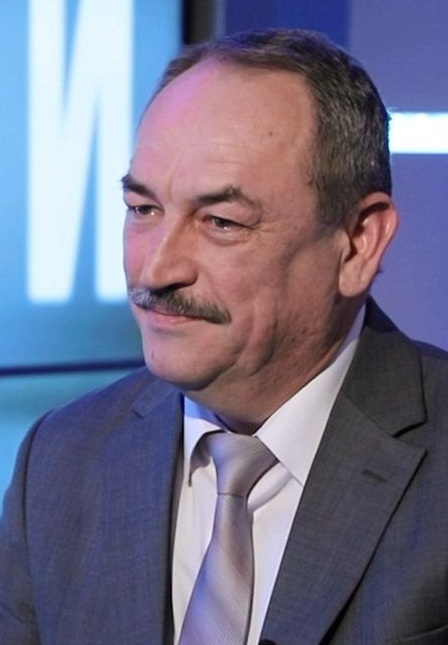
	First party
Leader	Alexander Korshunov
Party	Obnovlenie
Last election	35 seats
Seats won	29
Seat change	▼6
Speaker before election
Alexander Korshunov
Obnovlenie
Elected Speaker
Alexander Korshunov
Obnovlenie

Parliamentary elections were held in Transnistria on 29 November 2020, alongside municipal elections.

== Electoral system ==
The 33 seats of the Supreme Council are elected in single-member constituencies using first-past-the-post voting.

== Campaign ==
Obnovlenie candidates ran unopposed in 22 of the 33 constituencies.

== Conduct ==
The Russian daily newspaper Kommersant labelled the election as undemocratic and unrepresentative. According to Freedom House "Figures who oppose the local elites linked with Sheriff Enterprises are subject to intimidation and have been mostly silenced in recent years. The territory's persecuted opposition parties did not play a significant role in the 2020 legislative elections, which left the Supreme Council with no genuine opposition." There were also allegations of electoral fraud.

== Results ==
Overall turnout was 27.79%, a record low figure, with Camenca District reporting the highest turnout at 40.86%.

Obnovlenie won 29 out of 33 seats in the Supreme Council, maintaining their status as a majority government. Four independent politicians were also elected, all of whom were said to be connected to Obnovlenie and Sheriff, the largest company in Transnistria.

23,493 voted "against all" (20.6%). This was a visibly higher percentage than during the previous elections. In fact, in some electoral districts, "against all" exceeded 30% of the votes; e.g., in the 15th district, candidate Andrei Safonov obtained 1,727 votes while "against all" obtained 1,056.

Party	Votes	%	Seats	+/–
Obnovlenie			29	–6
Transnistrian Communist Party			0	–1
Independents			4	–3
None of the above	23,493		–	–
Total			33	–10
Total votes	115,205	–		
Registered voters/turnout	410,592	28.06		
Source: Intellinews, CIKPMR, CIKPMR

=== By constituency ===
Constituency	Candidate	Votes	%
1 – Solnechny	Alexander Korshunov	2,173	80.66
1 – Solnechny	Against all	521	19.34
2 – Memorialny	Yury Yuryevich Kucherenko	2,256	81.15
2 – Memorialny	Against all	524	18.85
3 – Borisovsky	Oleg Anatolyevich Petryk	2,612	88.63
3 – Borisovsky	Against all	335	11.37
4 – Leninsky	Anton Nikolaevich Onufrienko	1,926	71.84
4 – Leninsky	Against all	755	28.16
5 – Tsentralny	Sergey Andreevich Pisarenko	1,597	72.10
5 – Tsentralny	Against all	618	27.90
6 – Pervomaisky	Ruslan Khanifovich Gareev	1,729	73.26
6 – Pervomaisky	Against all	631	26.74
7 – Tsentralny	Oleg Sergeevich Leontyev	1,791	78.38
7 – Tsentralny	Against all	494	21.62
8 – Yuzhny	Vladimir Dmitrievich Pelin	3,531	86.19
8 – Yuzhny	Against all	566	13.81
9 – Severny	Dmitry Vasilievich Ogirchuk	3,210	89.89
9 – Severny	Against all	361	10.11
10 – Severny	Oleg Markovich Baev	3,296	67.46
10 – Severny	Roman Ivanovich Bugra	1,200	24.56
10 – Severny	Against all	390	7.98
11 – Tsentralny	Boris Ilyich German	2,741	61.14
11 – Tsentralny	Andrey Viktorovich Sipchenko	976	21.77
11 – Tsentralny	Against all	766	17.09
12 – Kamensky	Valery Grigorievich Babchinetsky	1,710	62.59
12 – Kamensky	Against all	1,022	37.41
13 – Khrustovskoy	Porfiry Vladimirovich Shkilnyuk	4,141	81.61
13 – Khrustovskoy	Against all	933	18.39
14 – Metallurgicheskiy	Vadim Viktorovich Kravchuk	1,623	47.21
14 – Metallurgicheskiy	Alexander Stanislavovich Budasov	561	16.32
14 – Metallurgicheskiy	Oleg Andreevich Sikorsky	502	14.60
14 – Metallurgicheskiy	Against all	752	21.87
15 – Kirovsky	Andrey Mikhailovich Safonov	1,727	62.06
15 – Kirovsky	Against all	1,056	37.94
16 – Michurinsky	Yakov Yefimovich Galak	1,882	65.12
16 – Michurinsky	Against all	1,008	34.88
17 – Bolshemolokishsky	Vasily Anatolievich Kunitsky	3,957	72.42
17 – Bolshemolokishsky	Against all	1,507	27.58
18 – Popenksky	Valentin Nikolaevich Matveychuk	3,448	84.49
18 – Popenksky	Against all	633	15.51
19 – Krasnyansky	Sergey Fedorovich Cheban	2,256	66.20
19 – Krasnyansky	Pyotr Dmitrievich Balika	817	23.97
19 – Krasnyansky	Against all	335	9.83
20 – Pervomaisky	Oleg Valerievich Vasilatiy	2,586	71.12
20 – Pervomaisky	Against all	1,050	28.88
21 – Slobodzeysky	Pavel Viktorovych Shynkaryuk	2,625	90.52
21 – Slobodzeysky	Against all	275	9.48
22 – Sukleysky	Stepan Ivanovich Stepanov	2,173	58.56
22 – Sukleysky	Hryhoriy Vasilievich Horobchenko	912	24.58
22 – Sukleysky	Against all	626	16.87
23 – Kitskansky	Igor Teodorovich Yarych	2,298	79.99
23 – Kitskansky	Against all	575	20.01
24 – Parkansky	Ivan Vasilievich Nedelkov	2,632	71.79
24 – Parkansky	Against all	1,034	28.21
25 – Zapadny	Galina Mikhailovna Antyufeeva	2,608	69.83
25 – Zapadny	Against all	1,127	30.17
26 – Borodinsky	Vadim Georgievich Lipsky	1,714	63.58
26 – Borodinsky	Against all	982	36.42
27 – Partizansky	Evgeniy Viktorovich Gushan	1,941	65.27
27 – Partizansky	Against all	1,033	34.73
28 – Tsentralny	Ilona Petrovna Tyuryaeva	2,064	65.23
28 – Tsentralny	Valery Nikolaevich Shemyansky	477	15.08
28 – Tsentralny	Against all	623	19.69
29 – Odessky	Igor Semyonovich Buga	1,539	43.85
29 – Odessky	Nikolay Anatolievich Malyshev	1,296	36.92
29 – Odessky	Against all	675	19.23
30 – Kirovsky	Grigory Ivanovich Dyachenko	2,110	60.15
30 – Kirovsky	Sergey Sergeevich Malaman	497	14.17
30 – Kirovsky	Lyudmila Alekseevna Morozova	249	7.10
30 – Kirovsky	Against all	652	18.59
31 – Krasnodonsky	Vadim Fedorovich Levitsky	1,956	55.87
31 – Krasnodonsky	Aleksandr Sergeevich Markelov	912	26.05
31 – Krasnodonsky	Against all	633	18.08
32 – Komsomolsky	Andrey Viktorovich Mezhinsky	1,881	57.10
32 – Komsomolsky	Alexander Vladimirovich Shtembulyak	819	24.86
32 – Komsomolsky	Against all	594	18.03
33 – Vostochny	Viktor Mikhailovich Guzun	1,811	81.65
33 – Vostochny	Against all	407	18.35
