= 2010 Transnistrian parliamentary election =

- 12 December 2010

All 43 seats in the Supreme Council
- Turnout: 42.26%
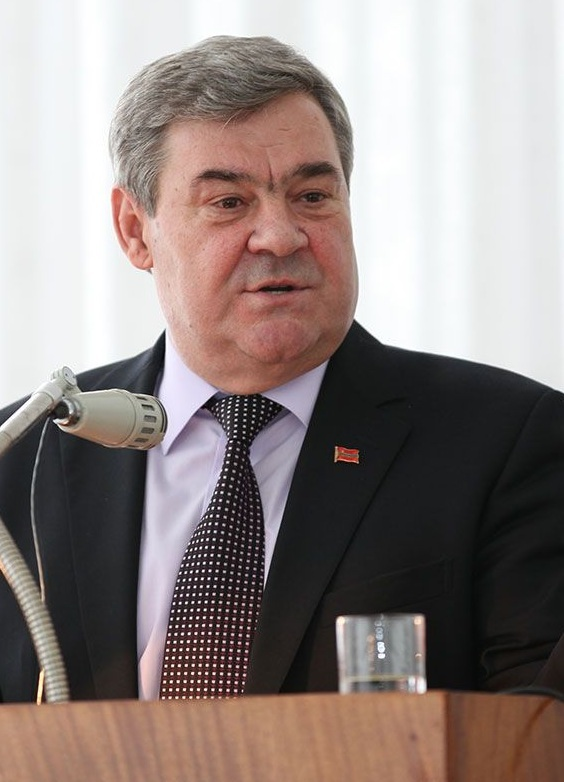

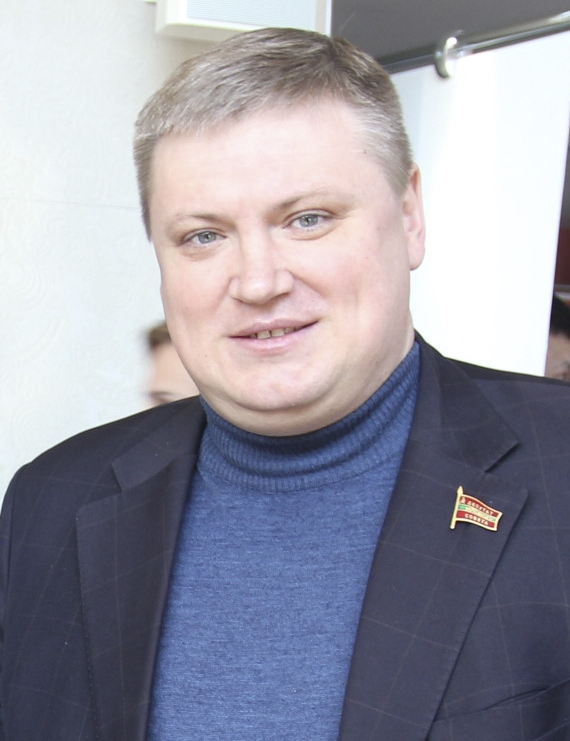

	First party	Second party	Third party
Leader	Anatoliy Kaminski	Oleg Khorzhan	Dmitry Soin
Party	Obnovlenie	PKP	Proriv
Last election	23	–	–
Seats won	25	1	1
Seat change	▲2	New	New
Speaker before election
Anatoliy Kaminski
Obnovlenie
Elected Speaker
Anatoliy Kaminski
Obnovlenie

Parliamentary elections were held in Transnistria on 12 December 2010. All 43 seats of the Supreme Council of Transnistria were up for election. Transnistria uses first past the post with 43 single seat constituencies.

In preparation for the election, boundaries of the electoral constituencies were reviewed and revised in September 2010.

== International observers ==
The Supreme Council passed a resolution on 27 October to invite international observers to monitor the election. MPs invited the members of the Federation Council, the State Duma, Russia's Electoral Commission, the Ukrainian Verkhovna Rada, the Parliament of Abkhazia, South Ossetia, North Ossetia-Alania, Artsakh, as well as the European Parliament, the OSCE and the Council of Europe.

Observers present included representatives from Abkhazia, Artsakh, Germany and Poland.

According to official data, 22 of the 43 members of its parliament (MPs) were born on the territory of PMR, while 4 were born in Moldova, 7 were born in Russia, 6 in Ukraine and 4 did not declare.

== Result ==
According to the results, overall turnout was 43%, with Constituency #11 (located in Rîbnița District) reporting 70.1%, the highest in the country. In this district, Sheriff founder Ilya Kazmaly swept the vote, being re-elected with 97.85% (also the highest in the country). The lowest turnout was in Constituency #2 (Bendery), with 29.3%.

Results for 42 constituencies were announced on 13 December, with one recount going on, in Constituency #27 (in Slobozia District). The election here was won by Oleg Vasilaty, who took 35.84% of the vote, only slightly more than the number of votes "against all", which was the highest in the country at 31.5%.

According to the provisional results, Renewal has won the election, taking 25 out of 43 seats in parliament. Yevgeny Shevchuk, Mikhail Burla and Anatoliy Kaminski, leaders of Renewal, were among those (re-)elected.

The Transnistrian Communist Party got its first seat in parliament after its leader Oleg Khorzhan was elected in Constituency #40 (Tiraspol), defeating Renewal deputy leader Olga Gukalenko.

Party	Votes	%	Seats	+/–
Obnovlenie			25	+2
Transnistrian Communist Party			1	New
Proriv			1	New
Independents			16	+15
Against all	8,810		–	–
Total			43	0
Total votes	171,771	–		
Source: Renewal, Olvia Press, Supreme Council, CEC, PKP

=== By constituency ===
Constituency	Candidate	Votes	%
1	Alexander Korshunov	1,911	64.58
1	Yuri Veniaminovich Ermolaev	550	18.59
1	Vladimir Ivanovich Ponomarev	266	8.99
1	Mikhail Vasilievich Babiy	62	2.10
1	Against all	170	5.75
2	Yuri Grigorievich Sporish	1,769	60.75
2	Vyacheslav Vladimirovich Toderashku	729	25.03
2	Inna Nikolaevna Polishchuk	267	9.17
2	Against all	147	5.05
3	Vladimir Evgenievich Pasyutin	1,887	73.86
3	Stepan Georgievich Popovsky	491	19.22
3	Against all	177	6.93
4	Valery Dmitrievich Kulakli	2,081	56.83
4	Sergey Ivanovich Babenko	1,388	37.90
4	Vitaly Viktorovich Kulakli	76	2.08
4	Boris Georgievich Kulakliy	20	0.55
4	Against all	97	2.65
5	Evgeniy Grigorievich Gulchak	2,717	85.44
5	Igor Alexandrovich Delev	147	4.62
5	Against all	316	9.94
6	Vitaly Nikolaevich Zinovenko	2,745	71.41
6	Oleg Andreevich Gudymo	388	10.09
6	Andrey Mikhailovich Safonov	368	9.57
6	Petr Georgievich Rukan	34	0.88
6	Against all	309	8.04
7	Valery Vladimirovich Chervonooky	1,630	50.97
7	Valery Ivanovich Kernichuk	1,363	42.62
7	Alexander Vladimirovich Batalenko	54	1.69
7	Against all	151	4.72
8	Sergey Nikolaevich Semenov	2,523	87.63
8	Stanislav Konstantinovich Dryagla	122	4.24
8	Against all	234	8.13
9	Oleg Sergeevich Leontyev	3,997	62.79
9	Stepan Ivanovich Placinda	2,246	35.28
9	Against all	123	1.93
10	Nikolay Petrovich Namashko	2,122	61.92
10	Vyacheslav Nikolaevich Nikolaev	760	22.18
10	Alexander Akimovich Karaman	505	14.74
10	Against all	40	1.17
11	Ilya Mikhailovich Kazmaly	7,178	99.17
11	Igor Vladimirovich Chalykh	27	0.37
11	Against all	33	0.46
12	Oleg Markovich Baev	4,551	95.25
12	Yuliy Anatolievich Yushin	105	2.20
12	Against all	122	2.55
13	Petr Semenovich Pasat	2,919	88.62
13	Against all	375	11.38
14	Andrey Viktorovich Sipchenko	2,821	66.14
14	Vladimir Timofeevich Dorofeev	1,038	24.34
14	Irina Nikolaevna Sergeeva	250	5.86
14	Against all	156	3.66
15	Valery Grigorievich Babchinetsky	3,285	67.80
15	Mikhail Semenovich Penkovsky	1,037	21.40
15	Oleg Alekseevich Gorokh	402	8.30
15	Against all	121	2.50
16	Vladimir Vladimirovich Bychkov	2,510	43.37
16	Igor Vladimirovich Karaush	2,426	41.92
16	Yuri Spiridonovich Fursa	742	12.82
16	Nikolay Geogievich Yazadzhi	15	0.26
16	Against all	94	1.62
17	Anatoly Konstantinovich Belitchenko	67.702,741	
17	Vasily Ivanovich Vlasov	957	23.64
17	Leopold Stratonovich Sanak	139	3.43
17	Against all	212	5.24
18	Klavdiya Mikhailovna Treskova	2,412	59.25
18	Mikhail Alekseevich Matushevsky	1,364	33.51
18	Pavel Semenovich Rybak	167	4.10
18	Evgeniy Sergeevich Balabas	15	0.37
18	Against all	113	2.78
19	Anatoliy Kaminski	3,199	85.49
19	Alexander Viktorovich Tsukanov	331	8.85
19	Against all	212	5.67
20	Alexey Mikhailovich Narubay	3,273	73.07
20	Yuri Ivanovich Kuzmenko	925	20.65
20	Against all	281	6.27
21	Andrey Vasilievich Yudin	2,816	69.55
21	Nikolai Nikolaevich Burdyuzha	595	14.69
21	Petr Vladimirovich Shchebetovich	442	10.92
21	Pavel Nikolaevich Voronovsky	40	0.99
21	Against all	156	3.85
22	Yevgeny Shevchuk	4,363	89.98
22	Vladimir Alekseevich Kravchenko	430	8.87
22	Against all	56	1.15
23	Sergey Andreevich Pisarenko	2,099	50.80
23	Igor Anatolievich Gilka	1,913	46.30
23	Vladimir Vladimirovich Kostynchuk	52	1.26
23	Against all	68	1.65
24	Valery Evgenievich Ponomarenko	2,160	76.92
24	Sergey Vladimirovich Martsinko	581	20.69
24	Against all	67	2.39
25	Andrey Borisovich Kotsyubenko	2,629	60.97
25	Valeriyan Andreevich Tulgara	1,606	37.24
25	Against all	77	1.79
26	Sergey Fedorovich Cheban	3,298	92.88
26	Viktor Dmitrievich Lyubenko	173	4.87
26	Against all	80	2.25
27	Oleg Valerievich Vasilatiy	1,353	40.32
27	Valery Ivanovich Rossovsky	561	16.72
27	Viktor Tikhonovich Vornik	173	5.15
27	Alexander Ivanovich Burlaka	62	1.85
27	Igor Fedorovich Brynzar	18	0.54
27	Against all	1,189	35.43
28	Vasily Nikolaevich Moraru	2,556	79.23
28	Lyudmila Fedorovna Ostapenko	481	14.91
28	Against all	189	5.86
29	Yuri Pavlovich Khorin	1,694	48.82
29	Yuri Vitalievich Gervazyuk	1,369	39.45
29	Dmitry Andreevich Orlov	154	4.44
29	Sergey Georgievich Syrf	145	4.18
29	Against all	108	3.11
30	Igor Teodorovich Yarych	3,006	72.56
30	Anatoly Mikhailovich Potolya	1,101	26.57
30	Against all	36	0.87
31	Efimy Mikhailovich Koval	3,394	91.43
31	Nikolay Nikolaevich Shtepa	124	3.34
31	Against all	194	5.23
32	Galina Mikhailovna Antyufeeva	3,751	88.93
32	Larisa Ivanovna Sidorko	197	4.67
32	Irina Yurievna Mabo	43	1.02
32	Against all	227	5.38
33	Vadim Georgievich Lipsky	2,297	57.58
33	Alexey Valentinovich Khokhlov	1,190	29.83
33	Tatyana Gavrilovna Guseva	353	8.85
33	Against all	149	3.74
34	Mikhail Burla	3,557	88.18
34	Yuri Petrovich Kutepov	231	5.73
34	Against all	246	6.10
35	Anatoly Viktorovich Dirun	2,034	46.37
35	Vladimir Alekseevich Buchka	1,923	43.84
35	Fotinia Anufrievna Kotelnikova	122	2.78
35	Mikhail Pavlovich Bolenkov	81	1.85
35	Denis Ivanovich Savva	14	0.32
35	Against all	212	4.83
36	Ilona Petrovna Tyuryaeva	3,293	80.08
36	Oleg Nikolaevich Rogalchuk	321	7.81
36	Against all	498	12.11
37	Vladimir Lukich Bodnar	1,641	48.80
37	Mikhail Valeriyanovich Polishchuk	792	23.55
37	Alexander Vladimirovich Berezovsky	615	18.29
37	Against all	315	9.37
38	Dmitry Yurievich Soin	2,967	80.60
38	Egor Leonidovich Rotar	314	8.53
38	Against all	400	10.87
39	Grigory Ivanovich Dyachenko	3,058	79.20
39	Vladimir Nikolaevich Kabanyuk	583	15.10
39	Galina Evgenievna Kvitko	40	1.04
39	Against all	180	4.66
40	Oleg Khorzhan	1,701	45.82
40	Olga Vladimirovna Gukalenko	1,584	42.67
40	Alexander Yurievich Lyanka	236	6.36
40	Artur Viktorovich Ashchenko	21	0.57
40	Against all	170	4.58
41	Vadim Fedorovich Levitsky	3,123	54.05
41	Roman Ivanovich Khudyakov	2,267	39.24
41	Sergey Vladimirovich Pavlyuchenko	99	1.71
41	Against all	289	5.00
42	Vyacheslav Vasilievich Tobukh	3,478	91.50
42	Against all	323	8.50
43	Viktor Mikhailovich Guzun	2,566	69.39
43	Sergey Nikolaevich Marchenko	1,014	27.42
43	Yulia Vasilievna Moskalenko	16	0.43
43	Ivan Dobrovich Parayan	4	0.11
43	Against all	98	2.65

== Aftermath ==
The Supreme Council held its first session in the new composition on 29 December 2010. In this session, Anatoly Kaminski was re-elected as speaker.
