= 2025 Transnistrian parliamentary election =

- 30 November 2025

All 33 seats in the Supreme Council 17 seats needed for a majority
- Registered: 394,000
- Turnout: 26.04% (▼2.02 pp)
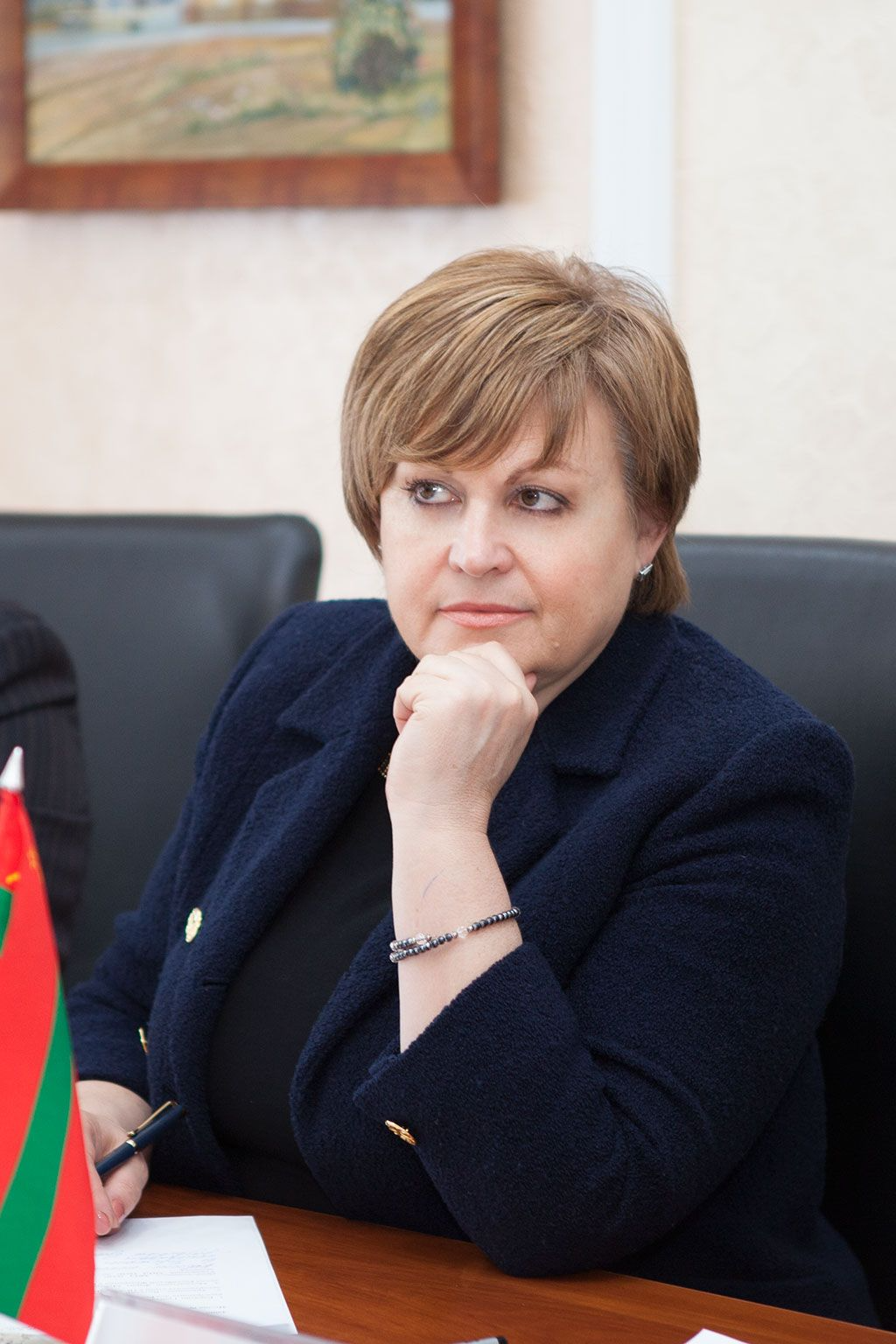
	First party
Leader	Galina Antyufeyeva
Party	Obnovlenie
Last election	29 seats
Seats won	33
Seat change	▲4
Speaker before election
Alexander Korshunov
Obnovlenie
Elected Speaker
Tatyana Zalevskaya
Obnovlenie

Parliamentary elections were held in Transnistria on 30 November 2025 to fill all 33 seats in the Supreme Council. Legislation passed in July 2024 set the date and electoral framework.

== Background ==
Since 2005 Obnovlenie, led by Galina Antyufeeva (its Chairperson and Deputy Speaker), has dominated the Supreme Council. In the 2020 election, Obnovlenie secured 29 seats with independents taking the remaining 4 seats.

== Election ==
Early voting for the election began on 24 November. Those who could not go to the polling stations on 30 November for a justified reason were allowed to vote early.

Moldova's official position on the election was that it contradicted the Constitution of Moldova and the country's legislation and that it had no legal consequences for the region.

The election used first past the post across 33 single member districts.

== Parties and candidates ==
Party	Leader	Seats before election	Seats needed for majority
Obnovlenie	Galina Antyufeeva	29	0
Independent	N/A	4	13

45 candidates ran for a seat in the Supreme Council. In 21 electoral districts, there was only one candidate; since there was no voter turnout threshold in Transnistria, a single vote would be enough for them to win. Nevertheless, Transnistrian elections feature an "against all" option. On the other hand, in 12 electoral districts, there were two candidates.

Minor parties remained weak or inactive in this electoral round.

== Conduct ==
No independent election monitors were present, and media and civil society continued to operate under constraints. Freedom House and other reports classified Transnistria as not meeting democratic standards, highlighting limited pluralism and restricted candidate access.

== Results ==
The official turnout was 26.04%, a record low, with 102,600 voters out of a total 394,000 people registered to vote. As of 2 December, only a preliminary list of the 33 elected parliament members had been published, with all belonging to the party Obnovlenie, which was under the control of oligarch Viktor Gushan's Sheriff company.

According to Ukraine's Foreign Intelligence Service (SZRU), the election demonstrated that Transnistria's "rupture with Moscow is deepening". In a report, the SZRU stated that the extremely low turnout, the lack of competition in the election and Obnovlenie's absolute control over the Supreme Council indicated a growing gap between "the occupation administration and the population", predicting that social discontent in Transnistria would intensify amid economic problems, pressure from tariffs and reduced Russian support.

Party	Votes	%	Seats	+/–
Obnovlenie			33	+4
Independents			0	–4
None of the above	9,964		–	–
Total			33	0
Total votes	102,600	–		
Registered voters/turnout	394,000	26.04		

=== By constituency ===
Constituency	Candidate	Votes	%
1 – Solnechny	Aleksandr Viktorovich Korshunov	1,982	88.29
1 – Solnechny	Mikhail Vasilevich Babiy	146	6.50
1 – Solnechny	Against all	117	5.21
2 – Memorialny	Yuriy Yurevich Kucherenko	2,275	92.59
2 – Memorialny	Against all	182	7.41
3 – Borisovsky	Oleg Anatolevich Petrik	2,068	91.59
3 – Borisovsky	Sergey Mikhaylovich Zakharov	93	4.12
3 – Borisovsky	Against all	97	4.30
4 – Leninsky	Yuriy Iosifovich Kara	1,894	86.05
4 – Leninsky	Tatyana Ivanovna Rybachenko	159	7.22
4 – Leninsky	Against all	148	6.72
5 – Tsentralny	Sergey Andreevich Pisarenko	1,259	62.70
5 – Tsentralny	Vladimir Vladimirovich Kornievskiy	532	26.49
5 – Tsentralny	Against all	217	10.81
6 – Pervomaisky	Aleksandr Ivanovich Ilin	1,662	81.75
6 – Pervomaisky	Against all	371	18.25
7 – Tsentralny	Oleg Sergeevich Leontev	2,078	81.46
7 – Tsentralny	Evgeniya Nikolaevna Bekher	283	11.09
7 – Tsentralny	Against all	190	7.45
8 – Yuzhny	Yuriy Fedorovich Evtodiev	2,784	85.16
8 – Yuzhny	Against all	485	14.84
9 – Severny	Dmitriy Vasilevich Ogirchuk	3,671	97.66
9 – Severny	Against all	88	2.34
10 – Severny	Dmitriy Olegovich Durnopyan	3,249	94.06
10 – Severny	Against all	205	5.94
11 – Tsentralny	Boris Ilich German	2,600	82.30
11 – Tsentralny	Yana Sergeevna Kovalchuk	241	7.63
11 – Tsentralny	Against all	318	10.07
12 – Kamensky	Valeriy Grigorevich Babchinetskiy	1,566	58.48
12 – Kamensky	Sergey Fedorovich Groza	860	32.11
12 – Kamensky	Against all	252	9.41
13 – Khrustovskoy	Oleg Ivanovich Narichuk	3,475	89.19
13 – Khrustovskoy	Against all	421	10.81
14 – Metallurgicheskiy	Vadim Viktorovich Kravchuk	2,139	88.98
14 – Metallurgicheskiy	Against all	265	11.02
15 – Kirovsky	Andrey Mikhaylovich Safonov	1,218	59.94
15 – Kirovsky	Irina Petrovna Svetlakova	271	13.34
15 – Kirovsky	Against all	543	26.72
16 – Michurinsky	Yakov Efimovich Galak	1,860	87.94
16 – Michurinsky	Against all	255	12.06
17 – Bolshemolokishsky	Vasiliy Anatolevich Kunitskiy	3,453	91.20
17 – Bolshemolokishsky	Against all	333	8.80
18 – Popenksky	Valentin Nikolaevich Matveychuk	2,778	91.14
18 – Popenksky	Against all	270	8.86
19 – Krasnyansky	Tatyana Dmitrievna Zalevskaya	2,643	90.98
19 – Krasnyansky	Against all	262	9.02
20 – Pervomaisky	Sergey Ivanovich Samoylov	2,237	78.91
20 – Pervomaisky	Against all	598	21.09
21 – Slobodzeysky	Pavel Viktorovich Shinkaryuk	2,815	90.40
21 – Slobodzeysky	Against all	299	9.60
22 – Sukleysky	Stepan Ivanovich Stepanov	2,024	75.49
22 – Sukleysky	Vladimir Valerevich Shvets	477	17.79
22 – Sukleysky	Against all	180	6.71
23 – Kitskansky	Igor Teodorovich Yarych	2,439	80.63
23 – Kitskansky	Against all	586	19.37
24 – Parkansky	Vladimir Nikolaevich Timofeev	2,348	76.86
24 – Parkansky	Larisa Viktorovna Talmazan	322	10.54
24 – Parkansky	Against all	385	12.60
25 – Zapadny	Galina Mikhaylovna Antyufeeva	2,558	82.25
25 – Zapadny	Shtefan Borisovich Muntyan	329	10.58
25 – Zapadny	Against all	223	7.17
26 – Borodinsky	Vitaliy Ivanovich Kalin	1,145	47.95
26 – Borodinsky	Natalya Aleksandrovna Golub	901	37.73
26 – Borodinsky	Against all	342	14.32
27 – Partizansky	Nataliya Kirillovna Durbala	2,649	91.00
27 – Partizansky	Against all	262	9.00
28 – Tsentralny	Elena Ilinichna Soboleva	2,532	92.61
28 – Tsentralny	Against all	202	7.39
29 – Odessky	Igor Semyonovich Buga	1,548	65.98
29 – Odessky	Against all	798	34.02
30 – Kirovsky	Grigoriy Ivanovich Dyachenko	1,945	80.24
30 – Kirovsky	Against all	479	19.76
31 – Krasnodonsky	Vadim Fyodorovich Levitskiy	2,511	94.19
31 – Krasnodonsky	Against all	155	5.81
32 – Komsomolsky	Andrey Viktorovich Mezhinskiy	2,461	92.03
32 – Komsomolsky	Against all	213	7.97
33 – Vostochny	Natalya Yurevna Sitkina	1,663	88.18
33 – Vostochny	Against all	223	11.82
Source: CIKPMR

The official results listed above claim that 75,529 voters (83.82%) voted for the winning ("Obnovlenie") candidates, 4,614 (5.12%) voted for the losing candidates, while 9,964 (11.06%) voted "against all".

== See also ==
- 2020 Transnistrian parliamentary election
- 2025 Moldovan energy crisis
- 2025 Moldovan parliamentary election
