= Tatyana Zalevskaya =

Transnistrian politician

- Татьяна Залевская
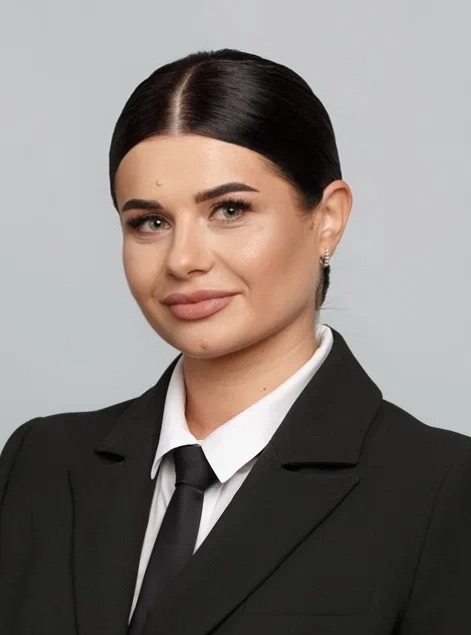
- Official portrait, 2025

Chairperson of the Supreme Council of Transnistria
- Incumbent
- Assumed office 4 December 2025
- Preceded by: Alexander Korshunov

Deputy of the Supreme Council of Transnistria
- Incumbent
- Assumed office 3 December 2025

Personal details
- Born: 30 May 1993 (age 33) Corotna, Slobozia District, Transnistria (Note: Transnistria's political status is disputed. It considers itself to be an independent state, but this is not recognised by any UN member state. The Moldovan government and the international community consider Transnistria a part of Moldova's territory.)
- Party: Obnovlenie
- Education: RUDN University

Tatyana Dmitrievna Zalevskaya (Russian: Татьяна Дмитриевна Залевская, Romanian: Tatiana Zalevscaia; born 30 May 1993) is a Transnistrian (Note: Transnistria's political status is disputed. It considers itself to be an independent state, but this is not recognised by any UN member state. The Moldovan government and the international community consider Transnistria a part of Moldova's territory.) politician and academic who has served as chairperson of the Supreme Council of Transnistria since 2025. At the age of 32, she became the youngest person to hold the position in the country’s history. She has previously chaired the Slobozia District and City Council of People's Deputies from 2020 to 2025. She is also an academic specializing in public administration and the sociology of management.

== Early life and education ==
Zalevskaya was born on 30 May 1993 in the village of Corotna, Slobozia District. In 2011, she graduated with a gold medal from Secondary School No. 2 in Dnestrovsc.

From 2011 to 2015, she studied at the Peoples' Friendship University of Russia (RUDN University) in Moscow, earning a bachelor's degree with honors in State and Municipal Administration. Between 2015 and 2017, she completed a master's degree in the same field, also with honors.

From 2017 to 2020, she pursued postgraduate studies at RUDN University in Sociology of Management and was awarded the qualification of “researcher and lecturer.” She holds the academic degree of Candidate of Sociological Sciences (PhD equivalent). Her research focuses on public–private partnerships in agriculture, with comparative analysis of the Russian Federation and Transnistria.

== Academic career ==
Zalevskaya has been affiliated with the Taras Shevchenko Transnistria State University in Tiraspol. She served as Head of the Department of State Administration at the Faculty of Public Administration and Social and Humanitarian Sciences and later became Dean of the same faculty.

Her academic work centers on governance, public administration reform, and public–private partnerships in the agricultural sector. She has authored research examining institutional cooperation between state authorities and private actors in rural development contexts.

== Political career ==
=== Local politics ===
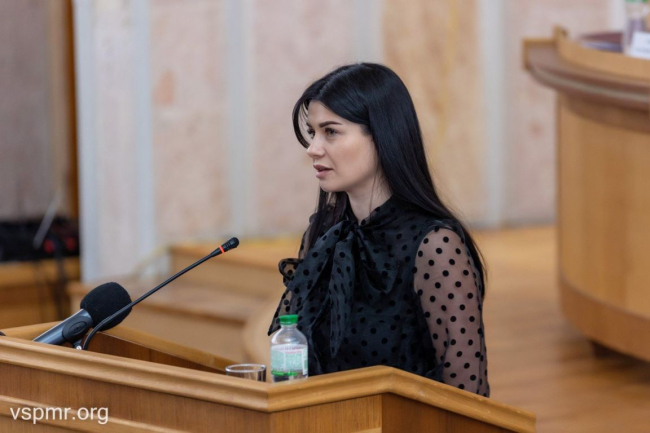
Zalevskaya in 2024, as the Chairwoman of the Slobozia District and City Council

On 29 November 2020, Zalevskaya was elected as a deputy of the Slobozia District and City Council of People's Deputies (electoral district No. 13, village of Korotnoye). On 17 December 2020, at the first session of the 26th convocation, she was elected chairwoman of the council, becoming one of the youngest local council leaders in the region. She held the position for five years.

=== Supreme Council of Transnistria ===
On 30 November 2025, Zalevskaya was elected as a deputy of the 8th convocation of the Supreme Council of Transnistria in elections not recognized by the Republic of Moldova. According to the human rights organization Promo-LEX, official turnout in the 2025 elections was reported at 26.01%, continuing a downward trend in participation compared to previous electoral cycles.

All 33 seats in the legislature were won by the political party Obnovlenie (Renewal), which is widely described as being affiliated with the Sheriff business holding.

On 3 December 2025, during the first plenary session of the new legislature in Tiraspol, Zalevskaya was unanimously elected Chairwoman of the Supreme Council. In her inaugural remarks, she emphasized the importance of “united teamwork” between the legislative body and the executive authorities for the development of the region.

She succeeded the previous speaker and became the youngest person to occupy the position. The vice chairpersons elected alongside her were Galina Antyufeyeva and Alexander Korshunov.

== Political context and controversies ==
Presidential elections in Transnistria are scheduled for 13 December 2026. The incumbent leader, Vadim Krasnoselsky, is ineligible to run for a third consecutive term. Since 2011, both Yevgeny Shevchuk and Krasnoselsky previously served as speakers of the Supreme Council before becoming head of the region, giving rise to an informal political pattern in which the presidency is assumed by a former parliamentary speaker. Whether Zalevskaya could follow a similar trajectory remains speculative.

The Moldovan government's Bureau for Reintegration has repeatedly stated that electoral processes organized by the Transnistrian authorities take place outside the constitutional framework of the Republic of Moldova and lack legal recognition.

== Awards and honors ==
Zalevskaya has received several distinctions from the Transnistrian authorities, including:

- Certificate of Honor of the President of Transnistria
- Certificate of Honor of the Supreme Council
- Medal “80 Years of Victory”
- Medal “30 Years of the Republican Union of Defenders of Transnistria”
- Medal “For Strengthening the Friendship of Transnistria and Russia”
- Medal of the Tiraspol City Council “For Contribution to the Development of Local Self-Government”
- Medal “35 Years of the Pridnestrovian Moldavian Republic”

== Personal life ==
Tatyana Zalevskaya is married.
