= Viktor Gushan =

Transnistrian businessman (born 1962)

- Born: 9 September 1962 (age 64); Carmanova, Moldavian SSR, Soviet Union (now Moldova)
- Citizenship: Moldovan; Transnistrian; Russian; Ukrainian
- Occupations: Spy, businessman, police officer
- Children: Evgeniy Viktorovich Gushan

Viktor Anatolievich Gushan (Russian: Виктор Анатольевич Гушан; Romanian: Victor Gușan; born 9 September 1962) is a Transnistrian businessman and former KGB officer with Transnistrian, Moldovan, Russian and Ukrainian citizenship. He, along with Ilya Kazmaly, founded the company Sheriff in the 1990s.

== Biography ==
Gushan was born on 9 September 1962 in Carmanova, near Grigoriopol, in the Moldavian SSR, Soviet Union (now Moldova). According to some sources, he is of Moldovan descent. He was a KGB officer, where, according to some sources, he was known as the "Sheriff".

In 1993, together with Ilya Kazmaly, he founded the Sheriff holding company, inspired either from his nickname or from his interests in the Wild West police force of the United States during the 19th century. Since March 2012, Gushan has full control of the company and is its chairman. Initially, the company was active in the cigarette and alcohol trade, and subsequently expanded to other areas. Sheriff holds a monopoly on trade, oil, telecommunications and Transnistrian media. In 2021, the company controlled about 60% of the economy of Transnistria.

Gushan is one of the richest people in all former-Soviet countries, with his fortune estimated at $2 billion. Besides Russia and Moldova (especially Transnistria), Gushan also has business in Ukraine, Cyprus and Germany (according to some sources he is also a German citizen). He also owns properties in the Odesa Oblast of Ukraine.

The success of Sheriff was facilitated by former Transnistrian president Igor Smirnov, who exempted the company from paying customs duties. The company supports the political party Obnovlenie, which has held power in the Transnistria for years. During his tenure as President of Transnistria, Yevgeny Shevchuk criticized the Sheriff monopoly and accused Gushan of being involved in various criminal activities. After completing his mandate, Shevchuk fled Transnistria, accusing Gushan of trying to assassinate him. Following the 2020 elections, Obnovlenie is the only party present in the Supreme Soviet of the Transnistria, thus concentrating all power in Gushan's hands. For these reasons, Gushan is considered an oligarch, or even the shadow leader of Transnistria. He is also the president of FC Sheriff.

In March 2023, Romanian senator Claudiu Târziu wrote a letter to the Ukrainian president Volodymyr Zelenskyy, demanding the withdrawal of Ukrainian citizenship for several Transnistrian figures, including Gushan.

According to various sources, Gushan is based in Germany.
