= Grigory Marakutsa =

Transnistrian politician (born 1942)

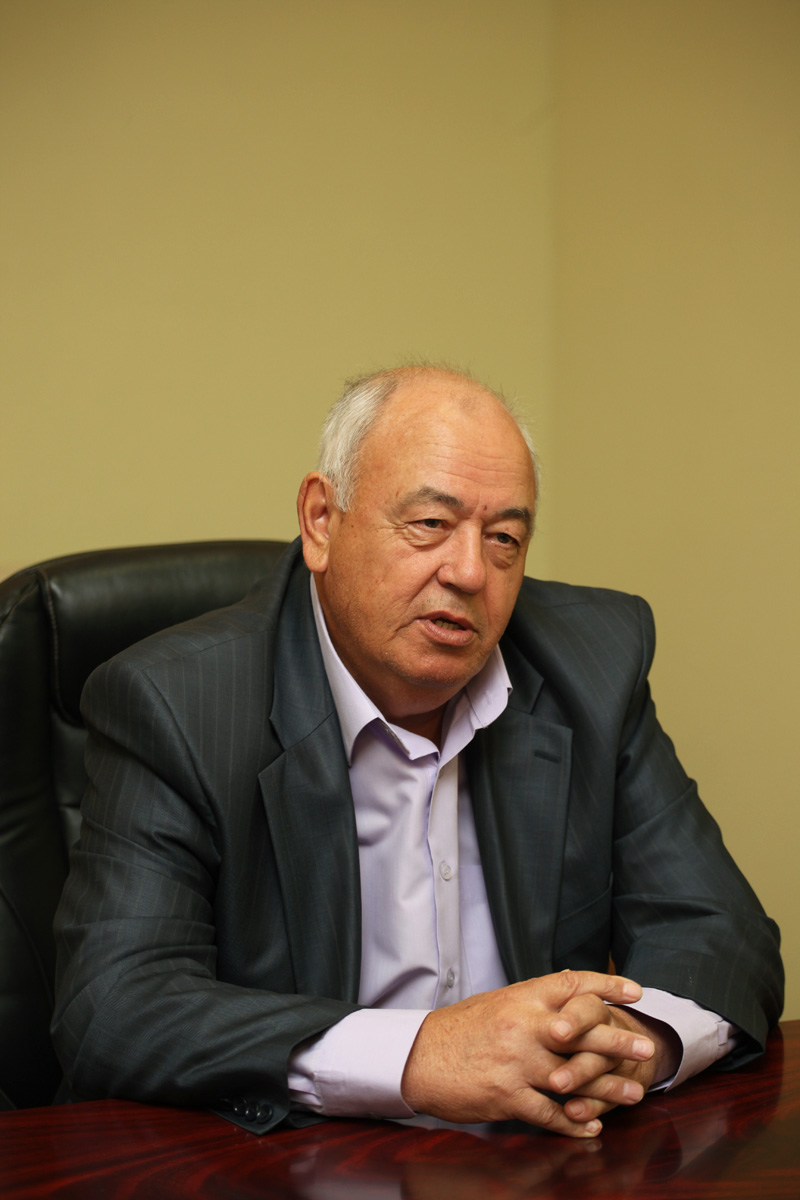
Makarutsa in 2012

Grigory Stepanovich Marakutsa (Russian: Григорий Степанович Маракуца, Romanian: Grigore Stepanovici Mărăcuță, Moldovan Cyrillic: Григоре Степанович Мэрэкуцэ); born 15 October 1942) is a Transnistrian politician and member of the Pridnestrovian Supreme Soviet.

He is a member of the Republic party, which is allied with president Igor Smirnov and which suffered a defeat in the 11 December 2005 parliamentary election. Although he retained his seat, his party lost its former majority position in parliament and he had to step down from his previous post as Speaker of Parliament, which was taken over by opposition politician Yevgeny Shevchuk from the Renewal party.

Marakutsa is an ethnic Moldovan.

Marakutsa was instrumental in the declaration of independence of the Pridnestrovian Moldavian Soviet Socialist Republic on 2 September 1990. He has held high leadership positions in Transnistria since that date. He is also one of the politicians in Transnistria with past experience as a Communist politician. Marakutsa was a candidate in the country's first ever presidential election in 1991, but he and his running mate Boris Akulov finished second to Smirnov.

Political offices
Preceded by Vladimir Gonchar (Acting)	Speaker of the Transnistrian Supreme Council; 1991–2005	Succeeded by Yevgeny Shevchuk
