= Oleg Khorzhan =

Transnistrian politician (1976–2023)

- Олег Хоржан
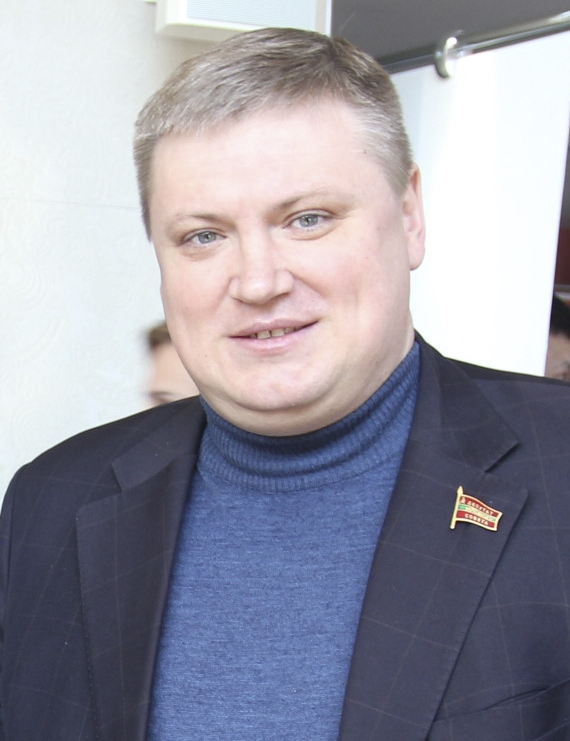
- Khorzhan in 2016

Leader of the Transnistrian Communist Party
- In office May 2003 – 19 May 2018
- Succeeded by: Nadezhda Bondarenko (acting)

Member of the Supreme Council of the Pridnestrovian Moldavian Republic
- In office 2010–2018

Personal details
- Born: 30 June 1976 Camenca, Moldavian SSR, Soviet Union
- Died: 16 July 2023 (aged 47) Sucleia, Transnistria (Moldova)
- Cause of death: Assassination (stab wounds)
- Party: Transnistrian Communist Party
- Children: 2

Oleg Olegovich Khorzhan (Russian: Олег Олегович Хоржан; Romanian: Oleg Olegovici Horjan; 30 June 1976 – 16 July 2023) was a Transnistrian politician who served as the longtime chairman of the Transnistrian Communist Party and as a member of Transnistria's Supreme Council. He was a vocal critic of the Transnistrian government and led protests advocating economic and social reforms.

Khorzhan was imprisoned in 2018 following an altercation with police, a case widely seen by his supporters as politically motivated. He was released in late 2022 after completing his sentence, but was found murdered in his office only six months later.

== Early life ==
Oleg Olegovich Khorzhan was born on 30 June 1976 in the town of Camenca, in the Moldavian Soviet Socialist Republic of the Soviet Union.

== Career ==
=== Early work ===
Khorzhan worked at the Dubăsari military hospital following the end of the Transnistria War in July 1992. He joined the local communist party when he turned 18 and took an active role in the reconstruction of the party's youth wing. In April 1995, he was elected to the Tiraspol City Council. From 1997 to 2000, he served as chairman of the parliamentary legal commission. Khorzhan was later awarded an honorary diploma by City Council for his work.

=== 2000s ===
In May 2003, he joined the newly created Transnistrian Communist Party (PKP) and was elected its chairman after the original party leader was imprisoned.

In March 2007, Khorzhan was arrested and detained for organizing a protest in Tiraspol against rising prices and taxes. He was subsequently sentenced to one and a half years of probation.

=== 2010s ===
In the 2010 parliamentary elections, Khorzhan became the first PKP candidate to be elected to the Supreme Council. During his first term he was assigned to the Committee on Education, Science and Culture.

Khorzhan ran in the 2011 presidential election as an independent with the support of the PKP, and came in fourth with 5.09% of the vote.

On the anniversary of Transnistria's founding in 2014, then-President Yevgeny Shevchuk awarded Khorzhan the medal "For Labor Valor".

For his efforts in developing and strengthening relations between Transnistria and the other breakaway republic of South Ossetia, he was awarded an honorary diploma by the Parliament of South Ossetia. Khorzhan was also awarded the Order of Party Valor by the Communist Party of the Russian Federation for his work in Moscow.

Khorzhan was elected again in the 2015 parliamentary elections, taking first place in the No. 40 constituency with 43.62% of the vote.

Khorzhan ran for president again in the 2016 presidential election, this time as a PKP candidate. He placed third with 3.17% of the vote.

=== 2018 arrest and imprisonment ===
On 2 June 2018, Khorzhan held a rally in Tiraspol, at which, a number of attendees were detained by police. Later that day in the evening, Khorzhan went to the city's internal affairs building to meet with the director and vouch for the detainees' release. Police officers blocked him from entering the building and a physical altercation reportedly took place. Khorzhan wrote a statement to the police afterwards, denouncing the police's actions as a disproportionate use of force and a violation of his rights as a member of the Supreme Council. In turn, on the recommendation of head prosecutor Anatoly Guretsky, Khorzhan was stripped of his parliamentary immunity and arrested on 6 June 2018. Several other party members had been arrested by authorities prior to Khorzhan, including his wife, his son, and Tiraspol City Council deputy Alexander Samoniy. Khorzhan's arrest was immediately met with condemnation from members of the UPC–CPSU, who denounced his detention as illegal and politically motivated.

On 3 November 2018, the Supreme Court of Transnistria found Khorzan guilty of assaulting law enforcement and sentenced him to four and a half years in prison. He was also ordered to pay a hefty fine. Moldovan President Igor Dodon expressed his disagreement with the ruling and urged the Moldovan prosecutor's office to respond, but no action was taken by the latter.

Khorzhan was released from prison on 6 December 2022 after serving the entirety of his sentence.

== Assassination ==
On the night of 16 July 2023, Khorzhan was found dead in his own office, having apparently been murdered. The cause of death was reported as multiple stab wounds, with unverified reports emerging that Khorzhan had also been shot. Khorzhan's body was discovered by his wife lying next to an empty safe.

=== Investigation ===
The leader of the Civil Congress, Mark Tkachuk, wrote about Khorzhan's murder on social media. CPRF leader Gennady Zyuganov demanded an investigation into Khorzhan's murder. There have been no arrests linked to the murder.

== Personal life ==
Khorzhan was married and had two sons.

== See also ==
- List of unsolved murders (2000–present)
