= 1991 Transnistrian presidential election =

- 1 December 1991
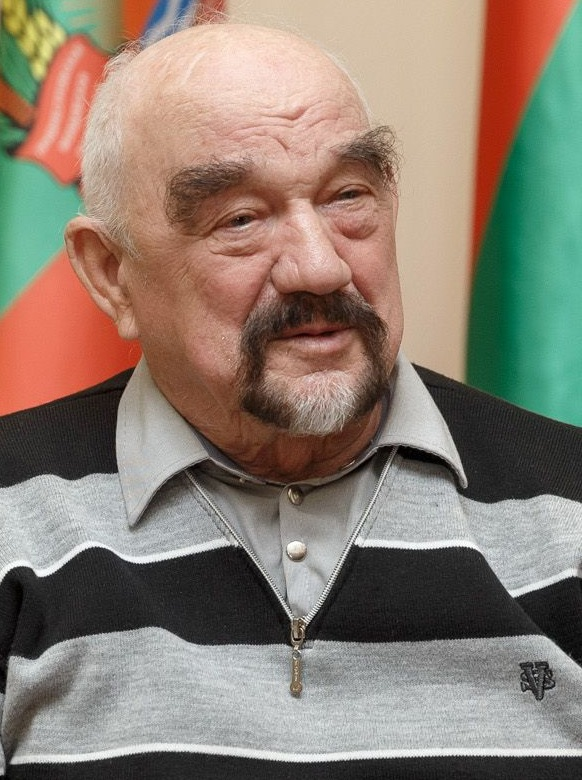

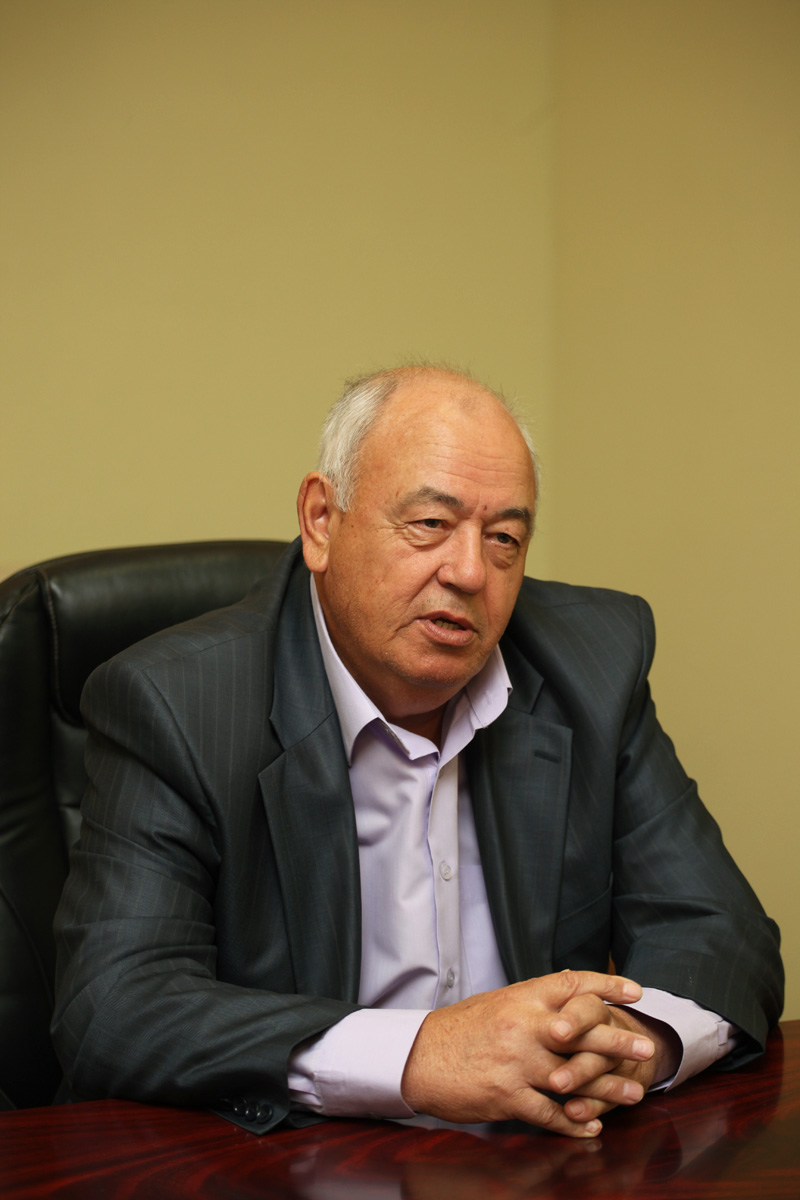
Nominee	Igor Smirnov	Grigore Mărăcuță
Party	Independent	Republic
Running mate	Alexandru Caraman	Boris Akulov
Percentage	65.4%	33.4%
Elected President
Igor Smirnov
Independent

Presidential elections were held in the breakaway republic of Transnistria on 1 December, 1991. These were the first such elections in the newly founded Pridnestrovian Moldavian Republic, won by Igor Smirnov, one of the country's founders. Smirnov faced two opponents: Grigore Mărăcuţă and Grigoriy Blagodarniy. Mărăcuţă would become an ally of Smirnov and was speaker of the Supreme Council until 2005. According to an article by the ethnic Russian researcher from Moldova Alla Skvortsova from 2002, "polls and elections in the PMR may to some extent have been rigged".

== Results ==
Candidate	Running mate	Party	Votes	%
Igor Smirnov	Alexandru Caraman	Independent		65.4
Grigore Mărăcuţă	Boris Akulov	Republic		33.4
Grigoriy Blagodarniy	Lyudmila Alfereva	Democratic Party		1.2
Total				
Source: Daily Report: Soviet Union
