= 2015 Transnistrian parliamentary election =

- 29 November 2015

All 43 seats in the Supreme Council 22 seats needed for a majority
- Turnout: 48.35%
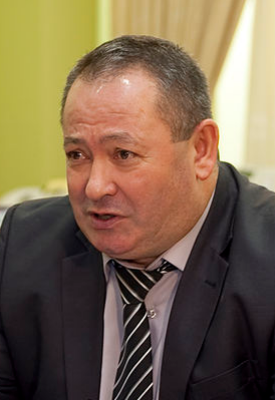

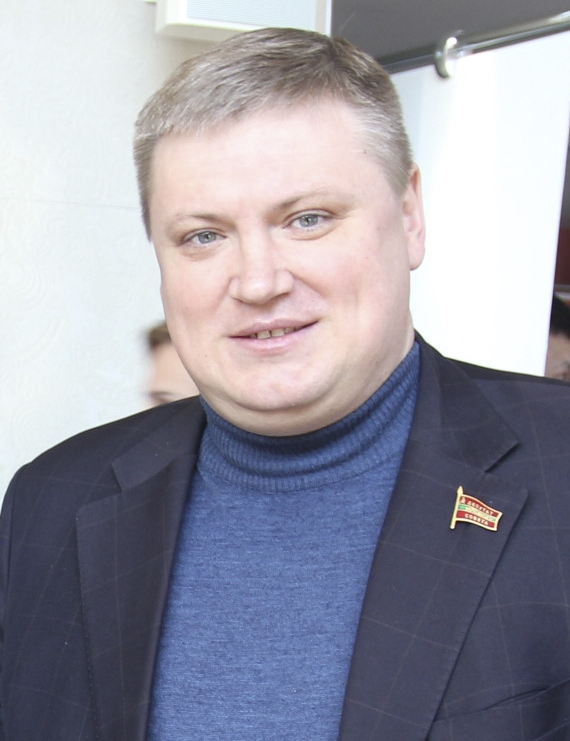
	First party	Second party
Leader	Mikhail Burla	Oleg Khorzhan
Party	Obnovlenie	PKP
Last election	25	1
Seats won	35	1
Seat change	▲10	Steady
Speaker before election
Mikhail Burla
Obnovlenie
Elected Speaker
Vadim Krasnoselsky
Independent

Parliamentary elections were held in Transnistria on 29 November 2015, alongside municipal elections.

== Electoral system ==
The 43 seats of the Supreme Council are elected in single-member constituencies using first-past-the-post voting.

== Campaign ==
A total of 138 candidates contested the elections.

== Results ==
Obnovlenie won 35 out of 43 seats in the Supreme Council, maintaining their status as a majority government. Obnovlenie leader Mikhail Burla was re-elected in constituency #34, as was PKP leader Oleg Khorzhan in constituency #40 (Tiraspol).

Overall turnout was 48.3%, with the Camenca District reporting the highest turnout of 54.0%. The lowest turnout was in the city of Bender, with a turnout of only 42.7%.

Party	Votes	%	Seats	+/–
Obnovlenie			35	+10
Transnistrian Communist Party			1	0
Proriv			0	–1
Independents			7	–9
Total			43	0
Total votes	205,229	–		
Registered voters/turnout	424,508	48.35		
Source: CIKPMR, CIKPMR

=== By constituency ===
Constituency	Candidate	Votes	%
1	Alexander Korshunov	2,512	58.95
1	Vitaly Vladimirovich Agapy	1,242	29.15
1	Maxim Alexandrovich Koval	140	3.29
1	Georgy Petrovich Bakhov	43	1.01
1	Against all	324	7.60
2	Vladislav Sergeevich Tidva	1,909	48.06
2	Mark Kivovich Finkelzon	768	19.34
2	Yuri Grigorievich Sporish	687	17.30
2	Valery Fedorovich Tsurkan	190	4.78
2	Evgeniy Valerievich Aginsky	139	3.50
2	Against all	279	7.02
3	Oleg Anatolievich Petrik	1,482	42.40
3	Vladimir Evgenievich Pasyutin	1,121	32.07
3	Mikhail Kirillovich Tessa	669	19.14
3	Against all	223	6.38
4	Sergei Pavlovich Khankevich	1,907	52.51
4	Valery Dmitrievich Kulakli	1,440	39.65
4	Against all	285	7.85
5	Oleg Leonidovich Belyakov	1,911	46.86
5	Evgeniy Grigorievich Gulchak	1,617	39.65
5	Andrey Alexandrovich Tereshkin	218	5.35
5	Against all	332	8.14
6	Sergey Andreevich Pisarenko	2,101	43.41
6	Anton Alekseevich Popov	1,798	37.15
6	Alexander Ivanovich Loktionov	355	7.33
6	Andrey Vladimirovich Badanov	301	6.22
6	Against all	285	5.89
7	Vadim Krasnoselsky	3,175	77.72
7	Alexander Vladimirovich Batalenko	472	11.55
7	Against all	438	10.72
8	Anton Nikolaevich Onufrienko	1,952	45.12
8	Vadim Viktorovich Kugila	1,342	31.02
8	Sergey Konstantinovich Bobrov	780	18.03
8	Against all	252	5.83
9	Oleg Sergeevich Leontyev	3,503	64.41
9	Alexander Valerievich Merzhuk	714	13.13
9	Nikolay Nikolaevich Dobryden	599	11.01
9	Alexander Vladimirovich Kifa	337	6.20
9	Yan Viktorovich Vereshchak	157	2.89
9	Against all	129	2.37
10	Vladimir Dmitrievich Pelin	1,865	40.85
10	Nikolay Petrovich Namashko	1,644	36.01
10	Natalya Mikhailovna Pogreban	826	18.09
10	Sergey Nikolaevich Beshlyaga	182	3.99
10	Against all	49	1.07
11	Dmitry Vasilievich Ogirchuk	5,652	92.23
11	Against all	476	7.77
12	Oleg Markovich Baev	2,798	57.99
12	Lyudmila Alekseevna Bakradze	1,620	33.58
12	Vladimir Ilyich Bodur	253	5.24
12	Against all	154	3.19
13	Petr Semenovich Pasat	2,016	47.90
13	Fedor Grigorievich Kovalev	1,632	38.77
13	Against all	561	13.33
14	Andrey Viktorovich Sipchenko	1,749	39.04
14	Alexander Yurievich Pascal	1,528	34.11
14	Eduard Davidovich Kantselevich	706	15.76
14	Against all	497	11.09
15	Valery Grigorievich Babchinetsky	2,796	53.02
15	Oleg Ivanovich Narichuk	1,485	28.16
15	Vyacheslav Alexandrovich Shevtsov	495	9.39
15	Stepan Georgievich Unguryan	267	5.06
15	Against all	230	4.36
16	Porfiry Vladimirovich Shkilnyuk	3,105	54.01
16	Alexander Andreevich Kisnichan	2,036	35.41
16	Eduard Georgievich Unguryan	357	6.21
16	Against all	251	4.37
17	Vasily Ivanovich Vlasov	1,919	45.37
17	Oleg Andreevich Sikorsky	1,101	26.03
17	Gennady Pavlovich Chorba	687	16.24
17	Against all	523	12.36
18	Vadim Viktorovich Kravchuk	1,652	38.60
18	Yulia Valerievna Dimitresko	1,197	27.97
18	Mikhail Ivanovich Perchun	1,034	24.16
18	Against all	397	9.28
19	Vitaly Ivanovich Kalin	2,089	53.47
19	Yuri Ivanovich Kuzmenko	1,138	29.13
19	Against all	680	17.40
20	Andrey Mikhailovich Safonov	1,821	47.20
20	Alexander Leontievich Marchuk	1,382	35.82
20	Against all	655	16.98
21	Yakov Efimovich Galak	2,255	53.66
21	Aurelia Viktorovna Tkachenko	1,508	35.89
21	Against all	439	10.45
22	Tatyana Mikhailovna Turanskaya	2,414	48.31
22	Yuri Alexandrovich Petrik	2,154	43.11
22	Against all	429	8.59
23	Valentin Nikolaevich Matveychuk	3,202	69.37
23	Igor Anatolievich Gilka	1,274	27.60
23	Against all	140	3.03
24	Alexander Vladimirovich Martynov	2,952	60.85
24	Petr Petrovich Stepanov	1,743	35.93
24	Against all	156	3.22
25	Vadim Mikhailovich Doni	1,852	47.84
25	Valeriyan Andreevich Tulgara	843	21.78
25	Alexey Mikhailovich Dontsu	713	18.42
25	Stepan Vasilievich Chebanov	225	5.81
25	Sergey Georgievich Syrf	149	3.85
25	Against all	89	2.30
26	Sergey Fedorovich Cheban	2,533	60.02
26	Igor Mikhailovich Kulikov	922	21.85
26	Tatyana Stepanovna Kulakovskaya	364	8.63
26	Alexey Vasilievich Chebanov	297	7.04
26	Against all	104	2.46
27	Oleg Valerievich Vasilatiy	2,236	55.07
27	Sergey Alekseevich Diligul	1,498	36.90
27	Vladimir Viktorovich Dombrovsky	71	1.75
27	Against all	255	6.28
28	Pavel Viktorovich Shinkaryuk	3,290	65.08
28	Vasily Nikolaevich Moraru	1,374	27.18
28	Natalya Vasilievna Popova	169	3.34
28	Tatyana Borisovna Kurlat	99	1.96
28	Against all	123	2.43
29	Alexander Sergeevich Shcherba	1,848	38.83
29	Pavel Nikolaevich Prokudin	1,180	24.80
29	Dmitry Mikhailovich Kokhansky	1,046	21.98
29	Yuri Pavlovich Khorin	517	10.86
29	Against all	168	3.53
30	Igor Teodorovich Yarych	3,241	91.14
30	Against all	315	8.86
31	Efimy Mikhailovich Koval	2,859	53.00
31	Sergei Ilyich Mantalutsa	1,171	21.71
31	Vitaly Valentinovich Yankovsky	561	10.40
31	Vasily Radionovich Tovstonog	246	4.56
31	Vladimir Ivanovich Ponomarev	214	3.97
31	Yuri Pavlovich Dobrov	186	3.45
31	Against all	157	2.91
32	Galina Mikhailovna Antyufeeva	3,564	71.52
32	Evgeniy Vladislavovich Zubov	757	15.19
32	Svetlana Ivanovna Fadeeva	392	7.87
32	Irina Yurievna Tibekina	47	0.94
32	Against all	223	4.48
33	Vadim Georgievich Lipsky	2,501	51.07
33	Petr Alexandrovich Nemchenko	1,383	28.24
33	Vladimir Ivanovich Atamanyuk	485	9.90
33	Against all	528	10.78
34	Mikhail Burla	2,696	59.16
34	Valery Evgenievich Ponomarenko	1,521	33.38
34	Against all	340	7.46
35	Evgeniy Viktorovich Gushan	2,690	43.98
35	Vladimir Grigorievich Trandasir	1,603	26.21
35	Anatoly Viktorovich Dirun	1,376	22.49
35	Against all	448	7.32
36	Ilona Petrovna Tyuryaeva	3,454	65.79
36	Tatyana Aleksandrovna Chebakova	700	13.33
36	Alexander Vilorovich Ordin	678	12.91
36	Oksana Vasilievna Sikach	165	3.14
36	Against all	253	4.82
37	Igor Semenovich Buga	2,484	55.55
37	Oksana Leonidovna Novak	1,030	23.03
37	Vladimir Lukich Bodnar	218	4.87
37	Elena Mikhailovna Bobkova	181	4.05
37	Vladimir Ilyich Yurash	164	3.67
37	Mikhail Valeryanovich Polishchuk	92	2.06
37	Evgeniy Viktorovich Volkov	48	1.07
37	Against all	255	5.70
38	Ilya Ivanovich Vasiliev	2,766	52.86
38	Natalya Grigorievna Nikiforova	823	15.73
38	Igor Vladimirovich Guslyakov	750	14.33
38	Nikolay Anatolievich Malyshev	524	10.01
38	Against all	370	7.07
39	Grigory Ivanovich Dyachenko	3,442	67.46
39	Valery Stepanovich Zemlyakov	1,158	22.70
39	Leonid Borisovich Tkachenko	152	2.98
39	Nina Ivanovna Dubchak	113	2.21
39	Against all	237	4.65
40	Oleg Khorzhan	2,183	44.57
40	Dmitry Alexandrovich Fisenko	1,555	31.75
40	Oleg Yurievich Timin	864	17.64
40	Against all	296	6.04
41	Vadim Fedorovich Levitsky	3,348	68.42
41	Maxim Alexandrovich Bratukh	1,156	23.63
41	Against all	389	7.95
42	Andrey Viktorovich Mezhinsky	2,727	54.65
42	Vyacheslav Vasilievich Tobukh	1,905	38.18
42	Against all	358	7.17
43	Viktor Mikhailovich Guzun	3,478	78.02
43	Yan Anatolievich Mezhinsky	671	15.05
43	Against all	309	6.93

== Aftermath ==
On 23 December 2015 Vadim Krasnoselski, who was elected in constituency #7, was elected Speaker.
