= Transnistrian Communist Party =

Transnistrian Communist Party Приднестровская коммунистическая партия
- Abbreviation: ПКП, PKP
- Chairperson: Oleg Khorzhan (2003–2018); Nadezhda Bondarenko (since 2018)
- Founded: 20 April 2003
- Headquarters: Gagarin Boulevard, 1B, Tiraspol
- Newspaper: Pravda Pridnestrovya
- Ideology: Communism; Marxism–Leninism
- Political position: Far-left
- Regional affiliation: UCP–CPSU
- International affiliation: IMCWP (observer)
- Seats in the Supreme Council: 0 / 33

Party flag

The Transnistrian Communist Party (Russian: Приднестровская коммунистическая партия, romanized: Pridnestrovskaya kommunisticheskaya partiya, ПКП, PKP) is a Marxist–Leninist communist party in the unrecognized state of Transnistria. The party was led by Oleg Khorzhan until his arrest and imprisonment in 2018. Nadezhda Bondarenko has since been the party's acting chairperson.

== History ==
The PKP first fielded candidates in the 2005 legislative election but did not win any seats.

Nadezhda Bondarenko, an editor of the official party newspaper Pravda Pridnestrovya and a member of the party's central committee, was the PKP's candidate in the 2006 presidential election. She received 8.1% of the vote, coming second to Smirnov, who won his fourth term in office with 82.4% of the vote.

Khorzhan and Bondarenko were arrested on 11 March 2007 while handing out leaflets ahead of an anti-Smirnov rally, and were sentenced to three days' detention as an administrative punishment. Two days later on 13 March, a communist demonstration took place in the capital Tiraspol against growing consumer prices and energy tariffs. Demonstrators also demanded the release of the two detained PKP leaders.

During Yevgeny Shevchuk's term as president of Transnistria from 2011 to 2016, PKP legislative members supported nearly all of his initiatives, even unpopular ones such as the reduction of government salaries and pensions by 30%. Party leaders insisted however, that they were legitimate opposition to Shevchuk, and rejected accusations of being fake opposition.

Transnistrian authorities arrested Khorzhan again on 6 June 2018, this time for allegedly assaulting law enforcement. Several other party members had been arrested by authorities prior to Khorzhan, including his wife, his son, and Tiraspol city council deputy Alexander Samoniy. On 3 November 2018, the Supreme Court of Transnistria found Khorzan guilty of his alleged crimes, and he was sentenced to four and a half years in prison and ordered to pay a hefty fine. Bondarenko has since served as acting chairperson.

== Newspaper ==
The party newspaper is the Russian-language biweekly Pravda Pridnestrovya (Правда Приднестровья). It is printed in Georgia and sold locally in Transnistria; digital copies are also available online.

== Election results ==
Presidential elections
Election	Candidate	Votes	%	Rank	Outcome
2006	Nadezhda Bondarenko	20,902	8.26	2nd	Not elected
2011	Oleg Khorzhan	12,646	5.09	▼4th	Not elected
2016	Oleg Khorzhan	8,012	3.17	▲3rd	Not elected

Supreme Council elections
Election	Seats	+/–	Outcome
2005	0 / 43		Extra-parliamentary
2010	1 / 43	▲1	Opposition
2015	1 / 43	Steady	Opposition
