= 2005 Transnistrian parliamentary election =

← 2000	11 December 2005	2010 →

All 43 seats in the Supreme Council
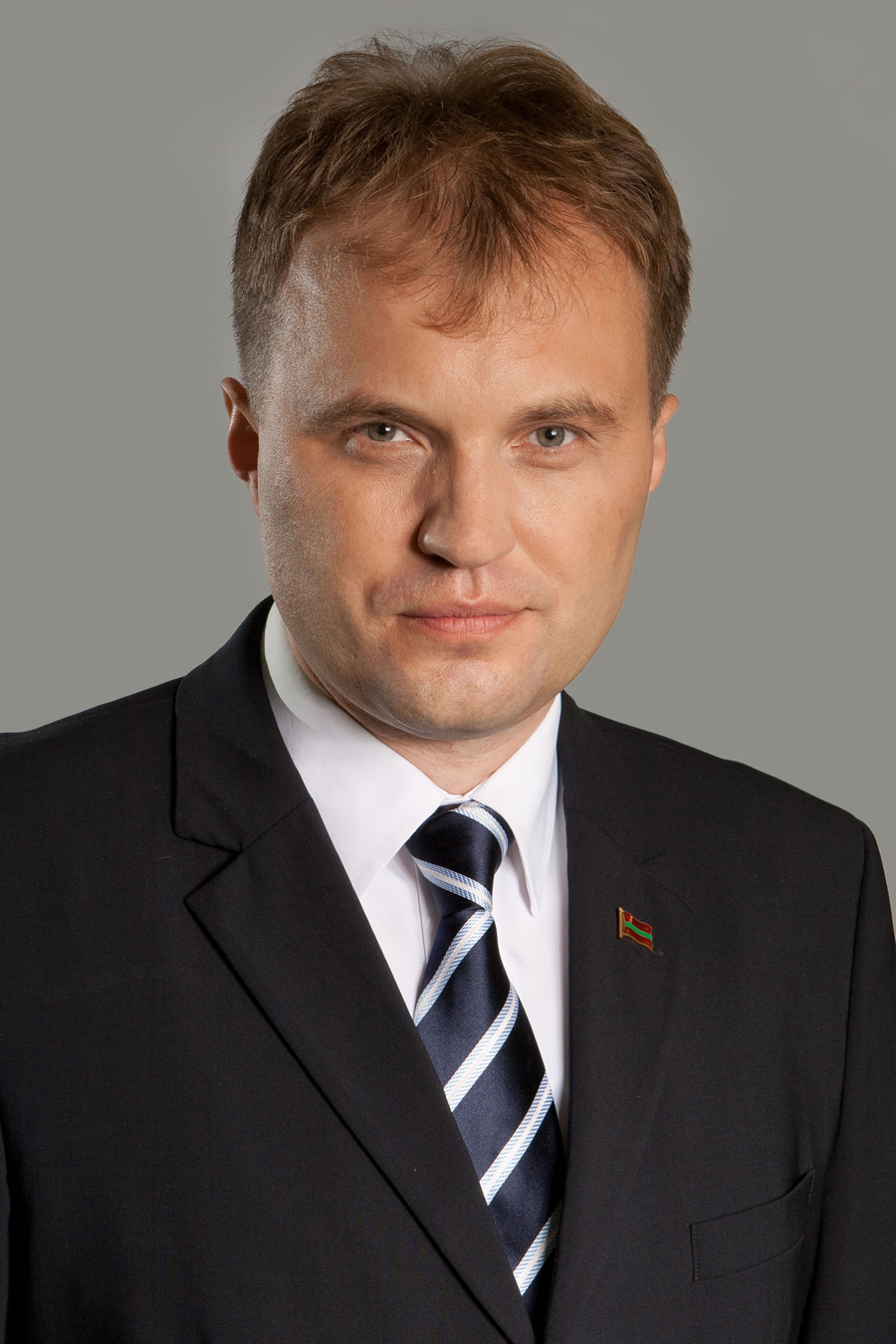

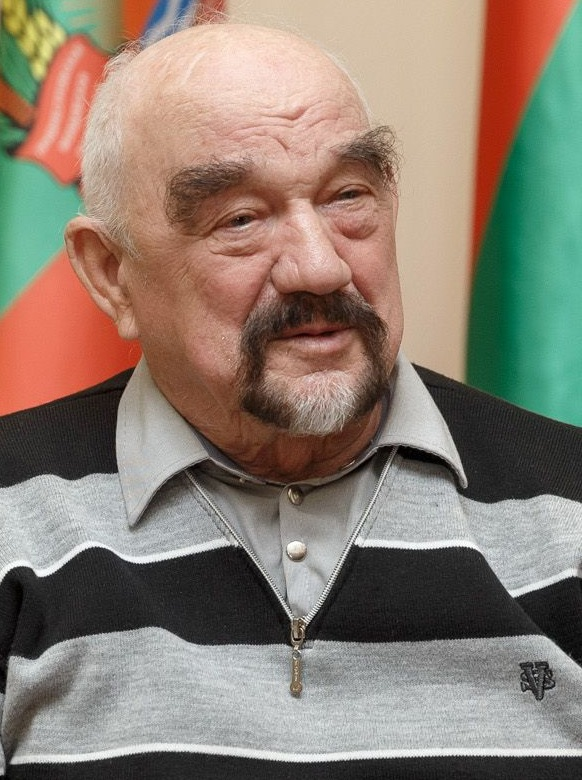
	First party	Second party
Leader	Yevgeny Shevchuk	Igor Smirnov
Party	Obnovlenie	Republic
Leader's seat	Constituency #22 (Rîbnița)	Did not run
Last election	7 seats	–
Seats won	23 (+ 6 allies)	13
Seat change	▲16	New
Speaker before election
Grigore Mărăcuţă
Republic
Elected Speaker
Yevgeny Shevchuk
Obnovlenie

Parliamentary elections were held in Transnistria on 11 December 2005. They were won by the Obnovlenie, an NGO which, together with their allies, beat long-time President Igor Smirnov's Republic party. Following its victory, in June 2006, Obnovlenie was registered as a political party.

== Results ==
According to PMR data, only 15 of the 43 members of its parliament (MPs) were born in the PMR territory (including 12 in Transnistria proper, and 3 in the Bessarabian area in and around the city of Bender, which is controlled by PMR), while 4 others in the rest of Moldova, with the remainder mainly born in Russia or Ukraine. Igor Smirnov, the leader of PMR, arrived in the region in 1987. Most of the MPs who were born elsewhere had moved to the region ten years or more before the conflict erupted. Moreover, according to the 2004 Transnistrian census, only 90% of the population of Transnistria had Transnistrian citizenship and could thus vote.

Party	Votes	%	Seats
Obnovlenie			23
Republic			13
Obnovlenie allies			6
Independents			1
Total			43
Valid votes	204,797	96.58	
Invalid/blank votes	7,260	3.42	
Total votes	212,057	100.00	
Registered voters/turnout	410,058	51.71	
Source: BHHRG, RIA Novosti, Regnum

== Aftermath ==
The victory of Obnovlenie enabled the party to change the long-term speaker of the Supreme Council, Grigore Mărăcuţă. On 28 December 2005, the leader of Renewal, Yevgeny Shevchuk was elected new speaker.
