= Zalevskaya =

Zalevskaya is a surname. People associated with the surname include:

- Tatyana Zalevskaya
- Svetlana Zalevskaya
