= 2011 Transnistrian presidential election =

- 11 December 2011 (first round); 25 December 2011 (second round)
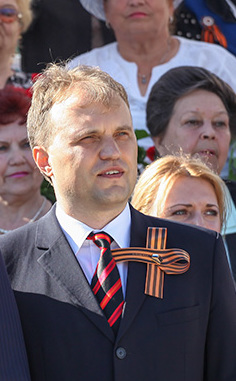

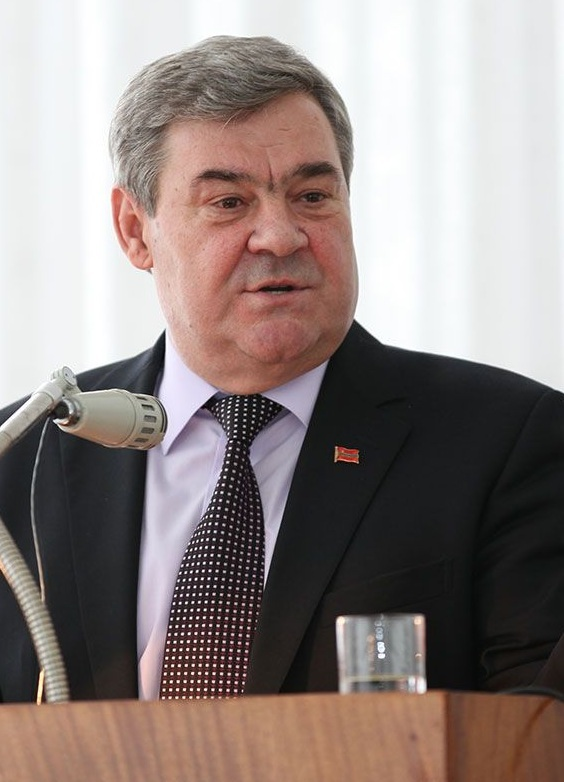
Nominee	Yevgeny Shevchuk	Anatoliy Kaminski
Party	Independent	Obnovlenie
Popular vote	165,502	44,071
Percentage	75.38%	20.07%
President before election
Igor Smirnov
Elected President
Yevgeny Shevchuk

Presidential elections were held in Transnistria on 11 December 2011. As no candidate received more than 50% of the vote in the first round, a run-off was held on 25 December.

== Candidates ==
Incumbent president Igor Smirnov, running for re-election, had been in power since Transnistria declared independence in 1990, and was not term-limited.

Candidate registration was open from 11 September to 11 November. On 14 September, opposition MP and former speaker of the Supreme Council Yevgeny Shevchuk was the first to nominate himself at the CEC. Shevchuk is affiliated with Obnovlenie, who are already supporting Kaminski, signalling a possible split. Shevchuk had been followed by Transnistrian Communist Party chairman and MP Oleg Khorzhan, as well as newspaper editor Andrey Safonov, who was also a candidate in the 2006 election.

On 28 September, Proriv founder and MP Dmitry Soin also nominated himself as a candidate.

Soin, Smirnov, Khorzhan, Safonov, Shevchuk and Kaminsky were registered as candidates, Safonov was initially refused registration by CEC with reference to more than 15% of invalid signatures among those gathered in his support, but later registered according to a ruling by Tiraspol city court.

According to the 2004 Transnistrian census, only 90% of the population of Transnistria had Transnistrian citizenship.

== Results ==
An exit poll taken showed Smirnov in the lead in the first round with 47.38%, with opposition vote split between Shevchuk (23.21%) and Kaminski (22.6%). Transnistrian law requires a majority to be elected, meaning a second round would be necessary. After the first round, Smirnov called for the results to be annulled due to irregularities. The announcement of results was postponed from 12 to 14 December. Preliminary results (at 95% counted) showed that Smirnov was only in third place with 25.5%, with Shevchuk at 39% and Kaminski at 27.7% reaching the run-off round. Kaminski was reportedly Russia's preferred candidate.

A run-off was held on 25 December and won by Shevchuk, who was elected with 75% of the vote. His rival Anatoliy Kaminskiy received only 20% and acknowledged his defeat.

Candidate	Party	First round		Second round	
Candidate	Party	Votes	%	Votes	%
Yevgeny Shevchuk	Independent	95,765	39.51	165,502	75.38
Anatoliy Kaminski	Obnovlenie	65,330	26.95	44,071	20.07
Igor Smirnov	Independent	61,248	25.27		
Oleg Khorzhan	Independent (PKP)	12,646	5.22		
Dmitry Soin	Proriv	1,441	0.59		
Andrey Safonov	Independent	1,303	0.54		
Against all		4,667	1.93	9,977	4.54
Total		242,400	100.00	219,550	100.00
Valid votes		242,400	97.59	219,550	98.01
Invalid/blank votes		5,986	2.41	4,460	1.99
Total votes		248,386	100.00	224,010	100.00
Registered voters/turnout			58.88	426,958	52.47
Source: Olvia Press 2 Transnistrian CEC
