= Dumitru Socolan =

Moldovan diplomat

Secretary General of the Ministry of Foreign Affairs
- Incumbent
- Assumed office 30 April 2026
- President: Maia Sandu
- Prime Minister: Alexandru Munteanu; Eugen Osmochescu (acting); Vasile Tofan
- Minister: Mihai Popșoi
- Preceded by: Mihai Mîțu

Moldovan Ambassador to Japan and South Korea
- In office 5 October 2021 – 27 March 2026
- President: Maia Sandu
- Prime Minister: Natalia Gavrilița; Dorin Recean; Alexandru Munteanu
- Preceded by: Vasile Bumacov
- Succeeded by: Sergiu Mihov

Secretary of State of the Ministry of Foreign Affairs and European Integration
- In office 4 December 2019 – 9 August 2021
- President: Igor Dodon; Maia Sandu
- Prime Minister: Ion Chicu; Aureliu Ciocoi (acting); Natalia Gavrilița
- Minister: Aureliu Ciocoi; Oleg Țulea

Moldovan Ambassador to Portugal and Morocco
- In office 3 February 2016 – 4 December 2019
- President: Nicolae Timofti; Igor Dodon
- Prime Minister: Pavel Filip; Maia Sandu; Ion Chicu
- Preceded by: Valeriu Turea
- Succeeded by: Alexei Cracan

Personal details
- Born: 1 February 1968 (age 58) Corotna, Moldavian SSR, Soviet Union
- Education: Moldova State University

Dumitru Socolan (born 1 February 1968) is a Moldovan diplomat. He currently serves as the Secretary General of the Ministry of Foreign Affairs of Moldova.
