= Alexei Cracan =

Moldovan diplomat

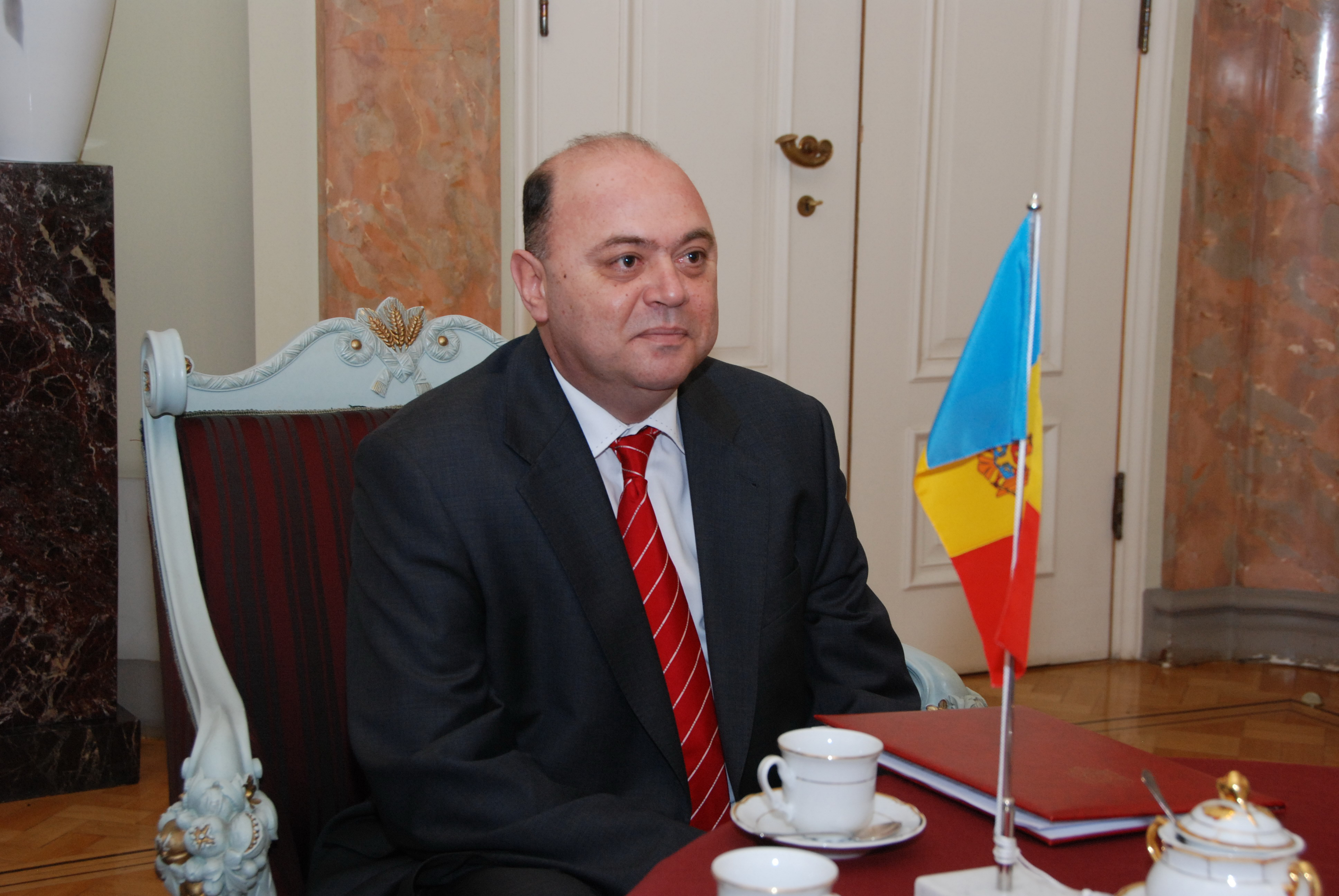
- Cracan in 2011

Moldovan Ambassador to Portugal and Morocco
- In office 1 October 2020 – 30 June 2026
- President: Igor Dodon; Maia Sandu
- Prime Minister: Ion Chicu; Aureliu Ciocoi (acting); Natalia Gavrilița; Dorin Recean; Alexandru Munteanu
- Preceded by: Dumitru Socolan
- Succeeded by: Sergiu Gurduza

Moldovan Ambassador to Latvia
- In office 16 August 2010 – 4 June 2015
- President: Mihai Ghimpu (acting); Vlad Filat (acting); Marian Lupu (acting); Nicolae Timofti
- Prime Minister: Vlad Filat; Iurie Leancă; Chiril Gaburici
- Preceded by: Eduard Melnic
- Succeeded by: Eugen Revenco

Personal details
- Born: 17 March 1960 (age 66) Danu, Moldavian SSR, Soviet Union
- Education: Maurice Thorez Moscow State Pedagogical Institute of Foreign Languages
- Profession: Diplomat

Alexei Cracan (born 17 March 1960) is a Moldovan diplomat.
