= Nadezhda Bondarenko =

Transnistrian politician (born 1950)

- Надежда Бондаренко

Chairperson of the Transnistrian Communist Party
- Acting
- Assumed office 19 May 2018
- Preceded by: Oleg Khorzhan

Personal details
- Born: 19 October 1950 (age 76) Ivanovo, Russian SFSR, Soviet Union
- Party: Transnistrian Communist Party

Nadezhda Andreevna Bondarenko (Russian: Надежда Андреевна Бондаренко; born 19 October 1950) is a Transnistrian politician who has served as the acting chairperson of the Transnistrian Communist Party (PKP) since late 2018. She was formerly a police officer, and was the PKP's candidate for the 2006 presidential election. She is currently the editor-in-chief of the PKP's party newspaper, Pravda Pridnestrovya. She is of Russian and Ukrainian descent.

== Early career ==
She worked as an investigator in the Ministry of Internal Affairs of the Soviet Union as part of the Tiraspol Internal Affairs Directorate. She later joined the Department of Transport of the Ministry of Internal Affairs of Transnistria. In 1999, she retired with the rank of Major. In 1991 she joined the ranks of the Communist Party of the Soviet Union. In 2003, she among the first founders of the CPP.

== Political career ==
In the 2006 presidential election, Bondarenko received 8.1% of the vote, second to Smirnov, who won his fourth term in office with 82.4% of the vote.

Bondarenko, then-PKP chairperson Oleg Khorzhan and three other activist were arrested on March 11, 2007, when handing out leaflets ahead of an anti-Smirnov rally and sentenced to three days' detention as an administrative punishment. On March 13, a communist demonstration took place in Tiraspol against growing consumer prices and energy tariffs and to demand the release of the communist leaders.

Following the arrest of Oleg Khorzhan in early 2018, Bondarenko became acting chairperson of the PKP on 19 May 2018.
