= Danu, Glodeni =

Danu
- Commune
- Location within Moldova
- Coordinates: 47.8316666667°N 27.5002777778°E
- Country: Moldova
- District: Glodeni

Population (2014)
  - Total: 2,979
- Time zone: UTC+2 (EET)
  - Summer (DST): UTC+3 (EEST)

Danu is a commune in Glodeni District, Moldova. It is composed of three villages: Camencuța, Danu and Nicolaevca.

== Notable people ==
- Alexei Crăcan (born 1960), Moldovan Ambassador to Latvia
