= Galina Antyufeyeva =

Transnistrian politician (born 1960)

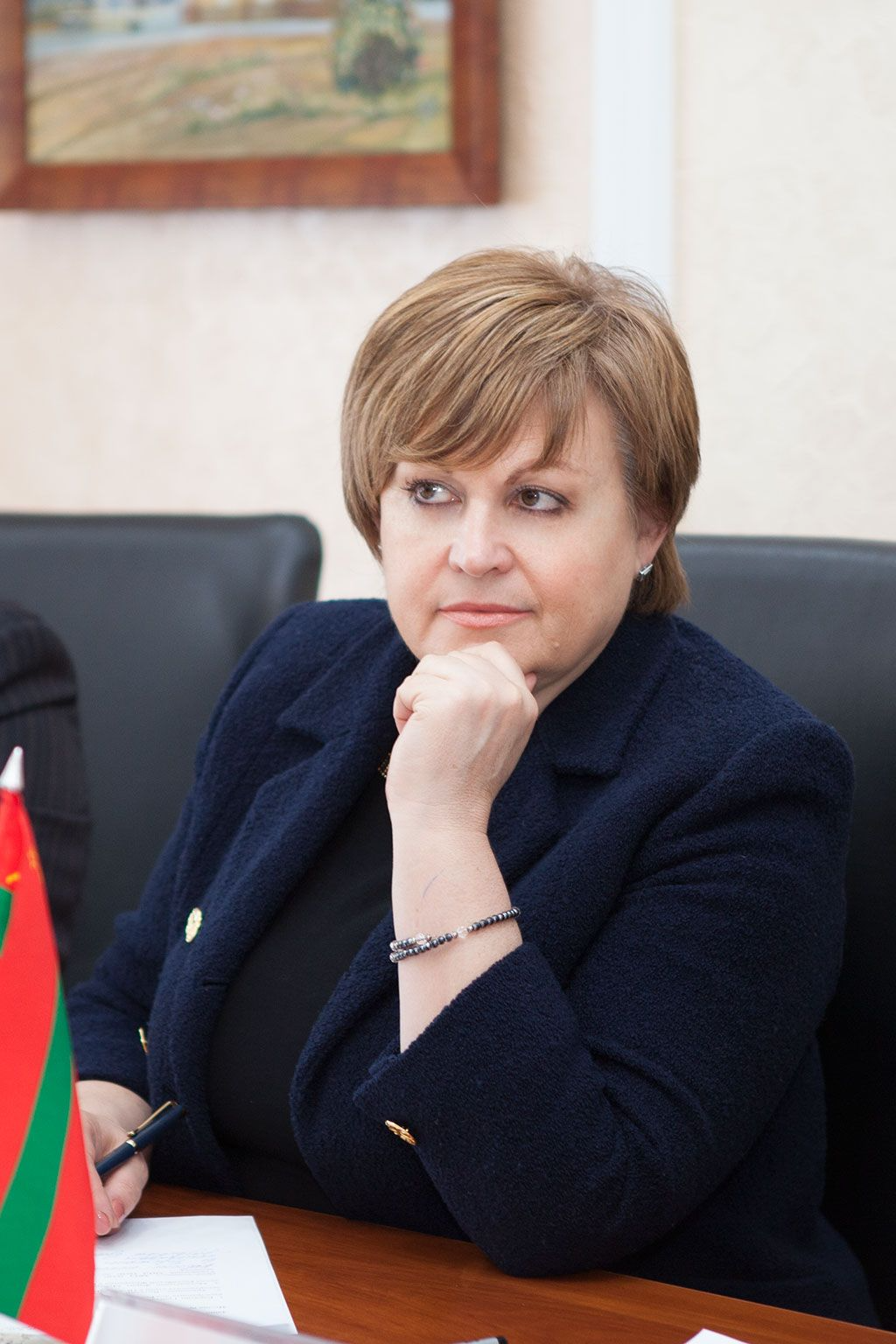
Official portrait of Antyufeyeva

Galina Mikhailovna Antyufeyeva (Russian: Галина Михайловна Антюфеева, Romanian: Galina Mihailovna Antiufeeva; born 6 January 1960) is a Transnistrian politician and the wife of the breakaway state's former Minister for National Security, Vladimir Antyufeyev.

She was born on 6 January 1960 in Belogorsk, Amur Oblast, in Russia. In 1989 she graduated from Chișinău agricultural institute as "scientist-agronomist", followed by a juridical degree from the T. G. Shevchenko State University in Tiraspol in 1998.

Antyufeyeva is Deputy Chairman of Supreme Council of the Pridnestrovian Moldavian Republic. Since 2000 she has been a member of the Transnistrian parliament. As MP, she is head of the PMR parliamentary committee on Committee on Legislation, Law-Enforcement Agencies, Security, Defense, Protection Rights and Freedoms of Citizens and member of the Committee on Security, Defence and Peacekeeping Activity. She has been a member of the Respublika party allied with the PMR's president, Igor Smirnov. On 3 July 2007 she took part in founding the party Fair Republic. At some point, she switched to Obnovlenie, the dominant party of the country and is currently its chairperson.

In 2020, she was elected as a deputy of the Supreme Council of the VII convocation in electoral district No. 25 "Western". On 8 December 2020, she was elected Deputy Chairman of the Supreme Council.

== See also ==
- PMR parliament
