= Corotna =

Corotna Коротное (Russian) Коротне (Ukrainian)
- Village
- Location within Moldova
- Coordinates: 46°38′00″N 29°51′29″E
- Country (de jure): Moldova
- Country (de facto): Transnistria (Note: Transnistria's political status is disputed. It considers itself to be an independent state, but this is not recognised by any UN member state. The Moldovan government and the international community consider Transnistria a part of Moldova's territory.)
- Elevation: 9 m (30 ft)
- Time zone: UTC+2 (EET)
  - Summer (DST): UTC+3 (EEST)

Corotna (Moldovan Cyrillic: Коротна, Russian: Коротное, romanized: Korotnoye; Ukrainian: Коротне, romanized: Korotne) is a village in the Slobozia District of Transnistria, Moldova. It has since 1990 been administered as a part of the breakaway Pridnestrovian Moldavian Republic (PMR). The population of the village is estimated to up to 4 thousand people, mainly Moldovans.

According to the 2004 census, the population of the village was 3,625 inhabitants, of which 3,306 (91.2%) were Moldovans (Romanians), 102 (2.81%) Ukrainians and 172 (4.74%) Russians.

== Notable people ==
- Dumitru Socolan (born 1968), diplomat
- Tatyana Zalevskaya (born 1993), separatist politician
