= Carmanova =

Carmanova Карманово (Russian)
- Commune
- Location within Moldova
- Coordinates: 47°15′36″N 29°30′11″E
- Country (de jure): Moldova
- Country (de facto): Transnistria (Note: Transnistria's political status is disputed. It considers itself to be an independent state, but this is not recognised by any UN member state. The Moldovan government and the international community consider Transnistria a part of Moldova's territory.)
- Elevation: 122 m (400 ft)
- Time zone: UTC+2 (EET)
  - Summer (DST): UTC+3 (EEST)

Carmanova (Moldovan Cyrillic: Карманова; Russian: Карманово, romanized: Karmanovo) is a commune in the Grigoriopol District of Transnistria, Moldova. It is composed of four villages: Carmanova, Cotovca (Russian: Котовка, romanized: Kotovka), Fedoseevca (Russian: Федосеевка, romanized: Fedorseevka) and Mocearovca (Russian: Мочаровка, romanized: Mocharovka). It is currently under the administration of the breakaway government of the Transnistrian Moldovan Republic. Carmanova was known during the 19th century as Neudorf and was inhabited by Bessarabia Germans.

According to the 2004 census, the population of the village was 2,257 inhabitants, of which 551 (24.41%) were Moldovans (Romanians), 1,092 (48.38%) Ukrainians and 476 (21.08%) Russians.

== Notable people ==
- Viktor Gushan (born 1962), oligarch
