= Sheriff (company) =

Largest company in Transnistria, Moldova

- Native name: Шериф
- Company type: Corporate group
- Industry: Various
- Founded: 24 June 1993; 32 years ago
- Founders: Viktor Gushan; Ilya Kazmaly
- Headquarters: Tiraspol, Transnistria
- Area served: Transnistria
- Owner: Viktor Gushan
- Number of employees: 13,157 (2012)
- Website: sheriff.md/en/

Sheriff (Russian: Шериф) is the largest company in the unrecognised breakaway state Transnistria. Based in the city of Tiraspol, it was formed in the early 1990s by Viktor Gushan and Ilya Kazmaly, former members of the KGB. Sheriff has grown to include nearly all forms of profitable business in the unrecognised country, and has even become significantly involved in local politics and sport, with some commentators saying that company loyalists hold most main government positions in the territory. Anatoly Dirun, director of the Tiraspol School of Political Studies, stated that "Viktor Gushan is the person with the most influence here, both in politics and economics."

== Company ==
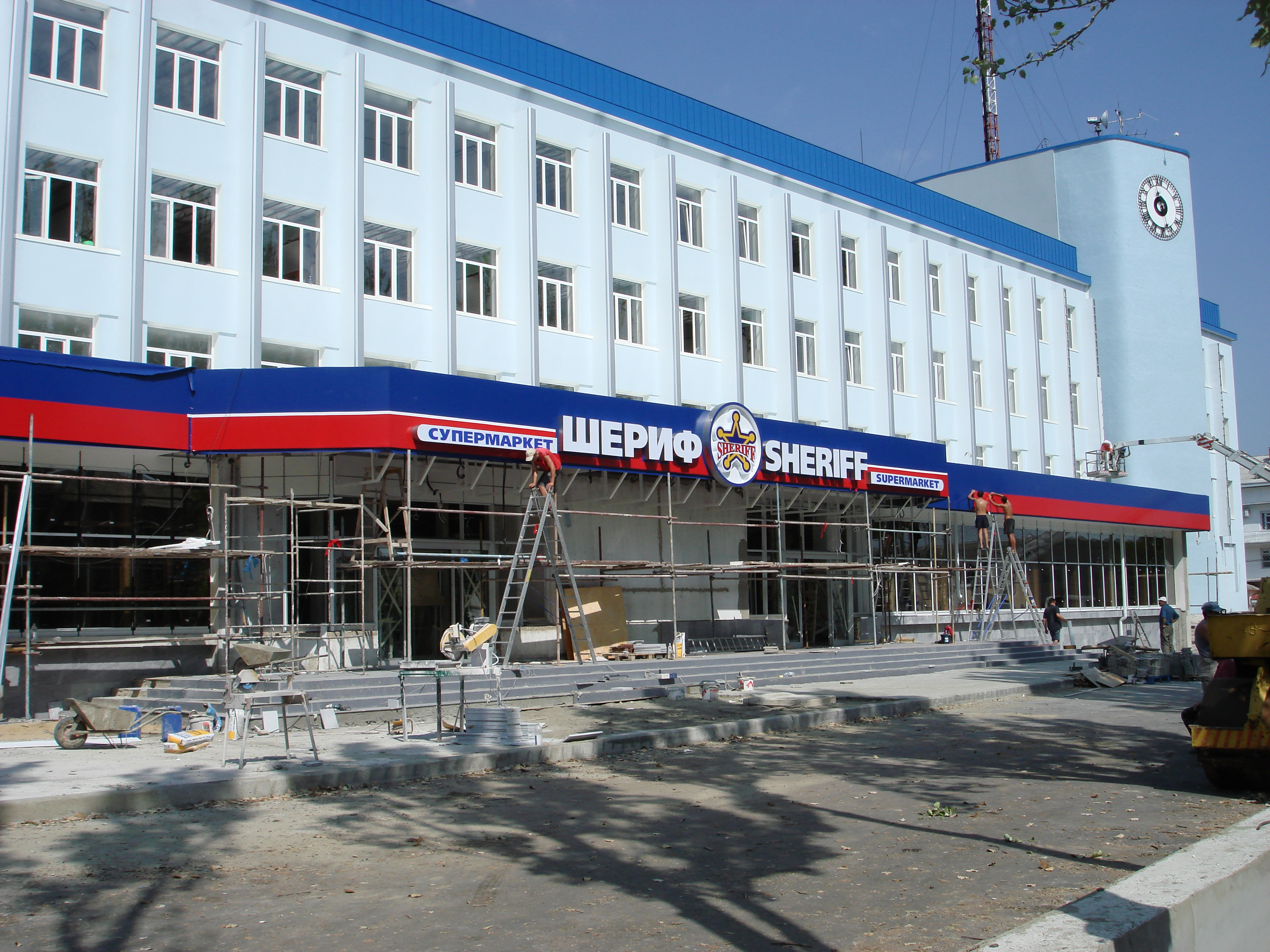
A Sheriff supermarket under construction in the city of Bendery

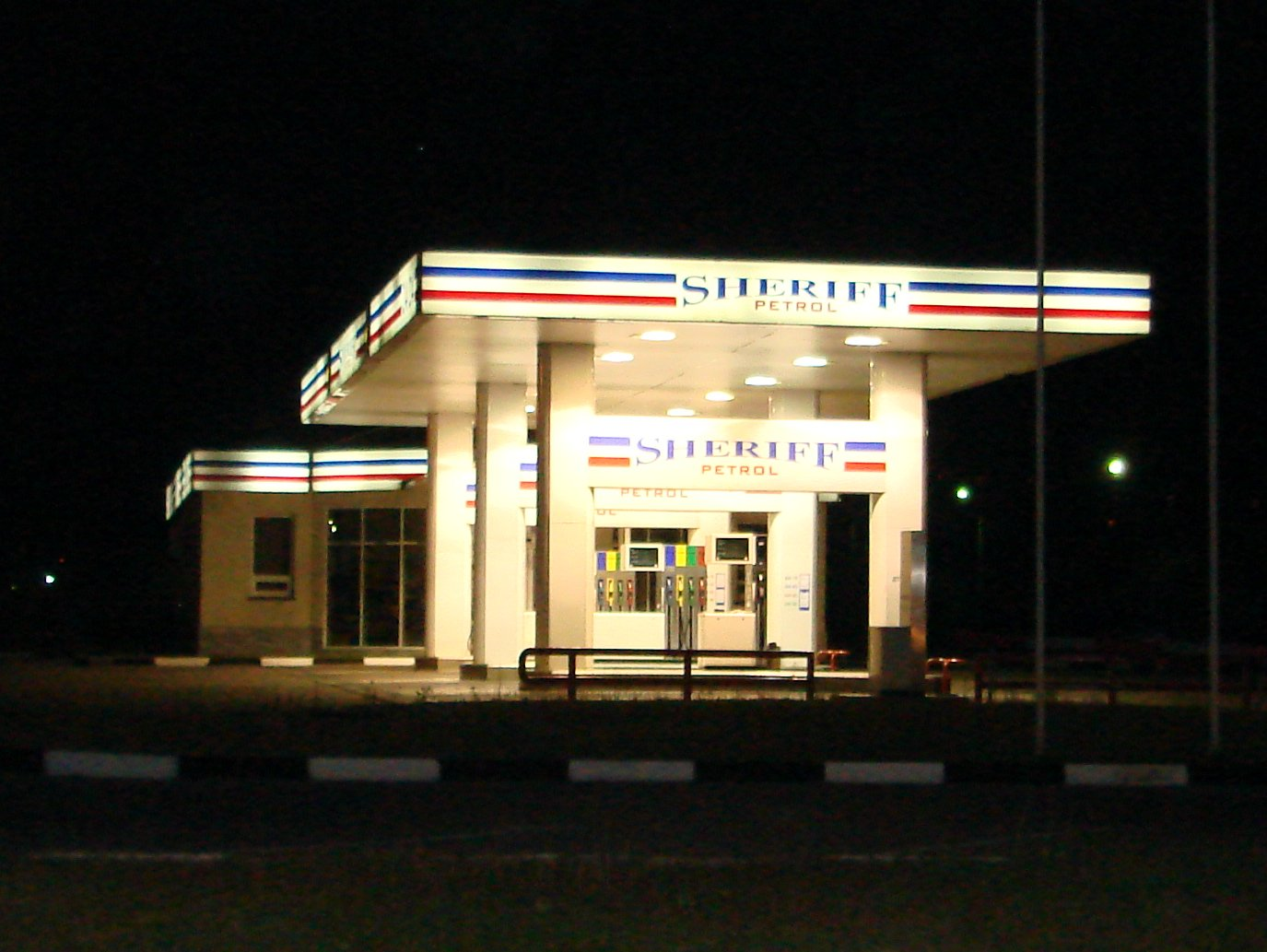
A Sheriff petrol station near Tiraspol

Sheriff owns a chain of petrol stations, a chain of supermarkets, a TV channel, a publishing house, a construction company, a Mercedes-Benz dealer, an advertising agency, a distillery, two bread factories, a mobile phone network, the football club FC Sheriff Tiraspol and its home ground Sheriff Stadium, a project which also included a five-star hotel.

== Political dealings and corruption ==
Due to Transnistrian government policies that have isolated the region from the rest of Moldova, Sheriff holds a monopoly in multiple industries in the unrecognized state. In the early years, this has also led to corruption between the government of Igor Smirnov and Sheriff. Where the company would support Transnistrian government policy and in return, the customs service, which was headed by the president's son, Vladimir, gave Sheriff an unfair reduction on taxes and import duties and is also said to be a major silent partner among the leadership of the company. Some media sources have also claimed that Oleg Smirnov, who was another son of Igor Smirnov, was a part of top leadership of Sheriff company, though these claims have never been directly proven. After 2006, the leadership of Sheriff have publicly opposed Smirnov's politics. Mysteriously following the 2011 Transnistrian presidential election which Igor ended up losing, allegations of Smirnov's clan involvement in Sheriff disappeared from articles about Transnistria.

Over the years, Transnistria's indeterminate status has slowed the growth of Sheriff. When a new party, Renewal, was formed in 2000 which had the goal of Transnistrian independence from Moldova and also supported big business interests, Sheriff supported them, and Sheriff co-founder IIya Kazmaly, as well as the company's Human Resources Director, Ilona Tyuryaeva, were elected to serve in Transnistrian parliament as members of Renewal.

Sheriff has used its economic clout to sway elections in Transnistria, by virtue of their ownership of the country's mobile/landline phone network and of TSV, a local television station. In the 2005 parliamentary elections, the Sheriff-supported Renewal party gained an absolute majority in Transnistrian parliament, winning 23 of 43 seats. This victory ousted the long-time Speaker of Parliament Grigori Maracutsa, who was replaced with Renewal leader Evgeny Shevchuk, who also had strong ties to Sheriff.

Following this electoral win, the government of president Smirnov later accused Shevchuk and Sheriff of plotting a coup d'état in Transnistria, claiming that Sheriff was plotting to reintegrate Transnistria with Moldova, in return for profitable business conditions for the company there. The claims were later denied by Sheriff, which maintained that they also desire independence from Moldova. Following multiple attacks between the two parties, Smirnov received the support of the Russian government against Sheriff, and Shevchuk disappeared almost entirely from the media despite being the president of Transnistria, and did not register to be a candidate in the 2006 Transnistrian presidential election. However, in the 2011 Transnistrian presidential election, Shevchuk beat both Igor Smirnov and Renewal's new leader Anatoliy Kaminski to become president. On 29 December 2012, Shevchuk issued a decree abolishing all preferences previously granted to Sheriff by Igor Smirnov and ended the period of the company's unfair market position in Transnistria's economy.

In 2015, it was alleged that roughly one third of all the money from the Transnistrian budget was paid out to companies owned by Sheriff.
