= Mikhail Burla =

Transnistrian politician

- Михаил Бурла
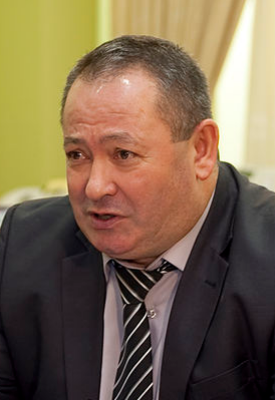
- Burla in 2012

Speaker of Supreme Council
- In office 13 June 2012 – 23 December 2015
- Preceded by: Anatoliy Kaminski
- Succeeded by: Vadim Krasnoselski

Personal details
- Born: 22 November 1957 (age 68) Storozhynets Raion, Chernovtsy Oblast, Ukrainian SSR, Soviet Union
- Party: Obnovlenie

Mikhail Porfirovich Burla (Russian: Михаил Порфирович Бурла; Ukrainian: Михайло Порфірович Бурла, romanized: Mykhaylo Profirovych Burla; Romanian: Mihail Porfirovici Burla; born 22 November 1957) is a Transnistrian politician and the chairman of the country's ruling political party, Obnovlenie, between 2012 and 2016.

== Biography ==
Burla was born on 22 November 1957 in Storozhynets Raion of the Chernivtsi Oblast in Ukraine. He is an economic geographer by profession and spent much of his career teaching at T.G. Shevchenko University in Tiraspol.

After satisfying the compulsory military service in the Soviet Army (November 1979 to May 1981), he worked as an assistant at the Department of Physical Geography of the above-mentioned institute. In 1982 he enrolled to pursue a post-graduate course in the field of economic, social and political geography at the Leningrad State University, which he graduated in 1985. In the same year he defended his thesis as a candidate in geographic sciences entitled: Economic and transport links of the agro-industrial complex of Moldovan SSR and ways of rationalization. On 28 November 1985, he obtained the academic title of candidate in geographic sciences (specialty 11.00.02 "Economic, Social and Political Geography") from the Council of the University of Leningrad, and was confirmed by the Superior Commission of Attestation of the Council of Ministers of the USSR on 2 April 1986. During the period 1982–1985, he took part in the development of the project "Forecasting the possible changes of the Moldovan RSS environment influenced by the economic activity of man until 2000". He is the author of four evaluative and perspective maps of the effect of economic activity on the environment.

Between 2 January 1986 and 30 November 2003, Mihail Burla worked at the Department of Economic Geography and Regional Economy of the State Pedagogical Institute "TG Shevchenko" in Tiraspol (since 1992 State University of Transnistria) in the following positions: assistant (up to April 1988), lecturer (until April 1991), associate professor (until 14 March 2003) and head of department (until 14 March 2003).

Until 1990 he taught courses and seminars of General Economics and Social Geography, Basis of Industrial and Agricultural Production, Economic and Social Geography of Moldovan SSR. Between 1991 and 2005 he taught courses on the following subjects: Technical and Economic Basics of Production, World Economy, International Economic Relations, Geography of International Goods Markets, International Organizations, Global Geography, Applied Geography, Territorial Organization of Services (for Students of the Faculty of Geography, specializing in Geography and World Economy); International Economic Relations, World Economy, Public and Municipal Administration, Government Economics, Business Theory, Entrepreneurship Basics (for Students from the Faculty of History and Law, for those from the Tiraspol Branch of the Moscow Business Administration Institute and for those from the Tiraspol branch of the Interregional Human Resources Academy in Kyiv).

He has also taught several courses of teacher training in geography and history (1986–2003). From 1 September 1999 to 1 September 2004, he was president of the Republican Scientific and Methodological Council on Geography. He is the author of the Concept of Geographical Education for General Education Institutions in Transnistria and of some experimental programs of teaching geography. He received the Honorary Title of "Excellent Worker of the National Education System" (in 1998). Between 2004 and 2005 he was a member of the Accreditation College of the Ministry of Education of Transnistria.

He has carried out a rich research activity. Since 1993 he has been a senior researcher at the Laboratory of Scientific Research of the State Pedagogical Institute "TG Shevchenko", taking part in the elaboration of several geographic atlases of Transnistria in the periods 1993–1996 and 2004–2005, as well as over 15 demographic and economic maps of Transnistria.

Between 2000 and 2001, Mihail Burla collaborated on the development of the book in three volumes History of Transnistria, being the author of the Transnistrian Economy Development chapter in the period 1990–2000. In 2005 he took part in the elaboration of the Historical Atlas of Transnistria, being the author of two maps of the social and economic development of Transnistria (for the periods 1944–1989 and 1990–2004). Mihail Burla was twice a winner of the Transnistrian State Prize for Science and Technology (1996; 2003), and was also an adviser to the Russian Academy of Natural Sciences (since 1998).

Burla is a member of Transnistria's Supreme Council, where he has been vice-speaker since 22 July 2009, and an ally of Yevgeny Shevchuk (speaker of parliament from December 2005 until July 2009) and Anatoliy Kaminski (speaker since 2009).

On 13 June 2012, Mikhail Burla was elected Speaker of Supreme Council to replace Anatoliy Kaminski who resigned following his failure in the presidential elections of 2011.

On 18 March 2014, on the same day of the Russian formal annexation of Crimea, Burla sent a request to Russia asking for Transnistria to be joined to it.

== Family ==
He is married and has two daughters.
