= Anatoliy Kaminski =

Transnistrian politician

- Анатолий Каминский
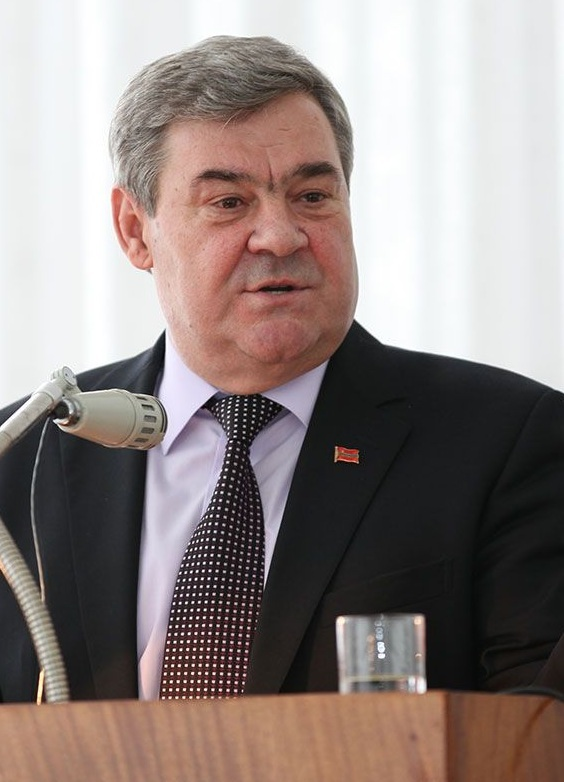
- Kaminski in 2011

Speaker of the Supreme Council
- In office 8 July 2009 – 13 June 2012
- Preceded by: Yevgeny Shevchuk
- Succeeded by: Mikhail Burla

Personal details
- Born: 15 March 1950 (age 76) Baley, Zabaykalsky Krai, Russian SFSR, Soviet Union (now Russia)
- Party: Obnovlenie

Anatoliy Vladimirovich Kaminski (Note: In this name that follows East Slavic naming customs, the patronymic is Vladimirovich and the family name is Kaminski.) (Note: Romanian: Anatoli Vladimirovici Kaminski; Russian: Анатолий Владимирович Каминский; Ukrainian: Анато́лій Володи́мирович Камі́нський, romanized: Anatolii Volodymyrovych Kaminskyi) (born 15 March 1950) is a Transnistrian politician who served as speaker of the Supreme Council from 2009 to 2012. He is the former chairman of the Obnovlenie party.

== Early life ==
Kaminski was born in 1950 in eastern Russia, but his family was of Ukrainian-Polish descent. His family moved to the Moldavian SSR in 1957. Kaminski studied in Odesa, Ukraine, at the M.V. Lomonosov Odesa Institute of Technology. He subsequently worked as a manager at several dairy plants in the Moldavian SSR.

== Political career ==
Kaminski's first political office was as a member of the council of the city of Rîbnița from 1990 until 2000, when he was elected to the Supreme Council. In 2005, he was re-elected in an election that proved to be a victory for his party. Kaminski was subsequently elected as vice-speaker, with Yevgeny Shevchuk, also of the Obnovlenie party, becoming speaker.

On 22 July 2009, Shevchuk resigned as speaker and Kaminski was elected unopposed to replace him. The newly elected vice-speaker was Mikhail Burla, chairman of Obnovlenie.

President of South Ossetia Eduard Kokoity awarded Kaminski the "Order of Friendship" on 12 March 2010, "for a great personal contribution to the development of friendship between the peoples of South Ossetia and Transnistria, merits in strengthening inter-parliamentary cooperation and for his 60-year birthday".

In December 2011, Kaminski ran for president of Transnistria as the candidate of Obnovlenie. In the first round of elections, he received 26.48% of the vote, narrowly making it into the second round of voting. Yevgeny Shevchuk, the former chairman of the Supreme Soviet, received the most support with 38.53%, while sitting president, Igor Smirnov, came in third with 24.82%. In the election, United Russia, the ruling political party of Russia, supported Kaminski's campaign.

== Personal life ==
Kaminski is married and has two children.
