= Obnovlenie =

Political party in Transnistria

Republican Party "Obnovlenie" Республиканская партия «Обновление»
- Chairperson: Galina Antyufeeva
- Founder: Yevgeny Shevchuk
- Founded: 2000; 26 years ago
- Registered: 2 June 2006; 20 years ago
- Headquarters: Building 192, 3300 9 January Street, Tiraspol
- Ideology: Conservatism; Economic liberalism Russophilia; Statism; Centrism (official)
- Regional affiliation: United Russia
- Colours: Red and green
- Slogan: "For a dignified life and people's prosperity!"
- Supreme Council: 33 / 33

Website
- www.obnovlenie.info

Obnovlenie (Russian: Обновление, lit. 'Renewal'), officially the Republican Party "Obnovlenie" (Russian: Республиканская партия «Обновление», romanized: Respublikanskaya partiya "Obnovleniye"), is a political party in the unrecognized state of Transnistria, an entity that is internationally recognized as part of Moldova. Widely regarded as the political arm of the Sheriff corporate group, it has been the parliamentary majority in the Supreme Council since 2005.

== History ==
The party was founded as a political non-governmental organization in 2000. Then in the legislative elections of 10 December 2000, it won 7 out of 43 seats.

In the 27 March 2005 local council elections, the party campaigned under the current name above, and won the majority of the seats for the first time in its five-year history. It improved on 11 December 2005 to win 23 of those 43 seats (with another 6 seats going to allies). Since the legislative elections of 2005, it is the majority party in the Supreme Council. The party's leaders in parliament during 2005 were Mikhail Burla and Yevgeny Shevchuk. The latter was elected speaker (chairman) of parliament following the party's sweeping December 2005 win.

It was officially registered as a full political party in June 2006.

There was a debate regarding the position of Obnovlenie in regards to Transnistrian president Igor Smirnov. Most analysts pointed to the party's opposition status, noting that it was not allied with Smirnov, whose party, Respublika, lost several seats to Obnovlenie in the 2005 parliamentary election. However, others claim that the interests of the "Smirnov faction" are represented in all political movements of Transnistria, including Obnovlenie.

Obnovlenie strengthened its majority in the 2010 elections to 25 seats. In the 2011 presidential election, deputy party chairman Anatoliy Kaminski ran against incumbent Smirnov and Shevchuk, who ran as an independent. Shevchuk defeated Kaminski in the run-off.

During Shevchuk's presidency, Obnovlenie held a majority in the Supreme Council of Transnistria and was mildly opposed to his policies. On 25 December 2012, the Supreme Council voted against a new state budget proposed by the government. Thus Transnistria is currently functioning without adopted state budget for the first time in its history. In spite of attempts to find compromise and formation of the joint commission to resolve conflict, these attempts did not lead to any results. Between 2012 and 2013, members of the Supreme Council from Obnovlenie voted against a number of important bills proposed by President Shevchuk and Prime Minister Pyotr Stepanov, including bills aimed to reform the Internal Revenue Code and introduce value-added taxation in Transnistria.

In the 2015 legislative elections, Obnovlenie strengthened their majority by winning 10 more seats in the Supreme Council. Their candidate for the 2016 presidential election, Vadim Krasnoselsky, was also victorious, defeating the incumbent Shevchuk with 62.3% of the vote.

== Election results ==
Supreme Council elections
Election	Seats	+/–	Outcome
2000	7 / 43		Opposition
2005	23 / 43	▲16	Majority
2010	25 / 43	▲2	Majority
2015	35 / 43	▲10	Majority
2020	29 / 33	▼6	Majority
2025	33 / 33	▲4	Majority

Presidential elections
Election	Candidate	Votes	%	Position	Outcome
2011	Anatoliy Kaminski	44,071	19.67	2nd	Not elected
2016	Supported Vadim Krasnoselsky	157,410	62.30	▲1st	Elected
2021	Supported Vadim Krasnoselsky	113,620	87.04	1st	Elected
