= Alexander Korshunov =

Transnistrian politician (born 1968)

- Александр Коршунов
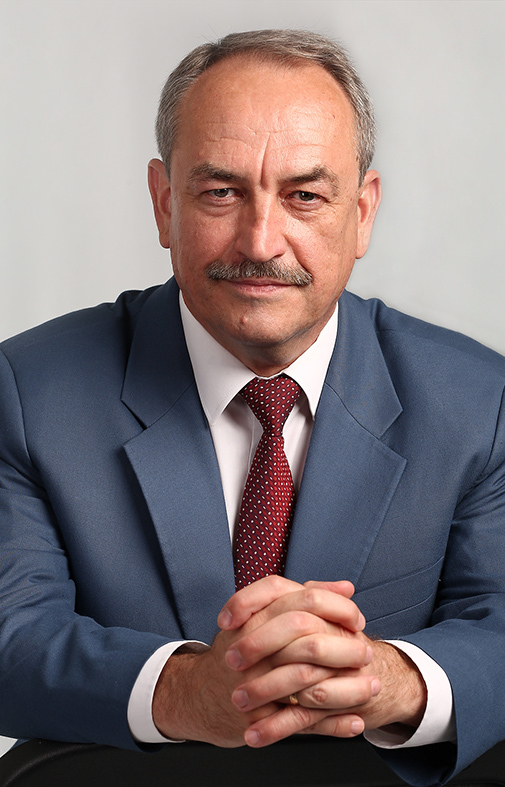
- Korshunov in 2020

Chairman and Speaker of the Supreme Council of Transnistria
- In office 6 February 2019 – 3 December 2025
- President: Vadim Krasnoselsky
- Prime Minister: Aleksandr Rozenberg
- Preceded by: Alexander Shcherba
- Succeeded by: Tatyana Zalevskaya

Deputy of the Supreme Council of Transnistria
- Incumbent
- Assumed office 12 December 2010

Personal details
- Born: 2 April 1968 (age 58) Bălți, Moldavian SSR, Soviet Union
- Party: Obnovlenie (since 2007)
- Police career
- Country: Transnistria
- Department: Ministry of Internal Affairs of Transnistria
- Branch: Bender
- Service years: 1992 — 1996
- Rank: Lieutenant

Alexander Viktorovich Korshunov (Russian: Александр Викторович Коршунов; Romanian: Aleksandr Korșunov; born 2 April 1968) is a Transnistrian Obnovlenie politician. He has been Chairman and Speaker of the Transnistrian Supreme Council since 2019.

== Early life ==
Koshunov was born on 2 April 1968 in the city Bălți in the Moldavian SSR. In 1974, the family moved to Bender.

In 1985 he graduated from high school and then studied at Kharkov Aviation Institute in the Ukrainian SSR. He graduated in 1991 with honours in the speciality of engineer-technologist of radio-electronic equipment.

From 1992 to 1996 he served as a police lieutenant in the city of Bender.

In 1999 he studied at the Belgorod University of Cooperation, Economics and Law in Russia, graduating in 2002 with a law degree. In June 2011 he graduated Belgorod State National Research University, majoring in state and municipal government.

== Political career ==
He began his political career as a deputy on Bender City Council of People's Deputies between 2010 and 2020. He served as the Chairman of the Standing Deputy Commission on Industry, Architecture, Municipal Property and Land.

On 12 December 2010, he was elected to the Supreme Council of the Transnistria as a Obnovlenie deputy.

On 29 November 2015, he was re-elected to the Supreme Council. He headed the parliamentary committee on economic policy, budget and finance. On 6 February 2019, he was elected Chairman of the Supreme Council.

On 29 November 2020, he was re-elected as a deputy of the Supreme Council, and elected as chairman and speaker once more on 8 December 2020.
