= Republic (Transnistria) =

Republic Республика
- Leader: Igor Smirnov
- Founded: 1990
- Registered: 2007
- Headquarters: Tiraspol, Transnistria
- Ideology: Transnistrian nationalism Russophilia; Cultural conservatism
- Colors: Red and green

Republic (Russian: Республика, romanized: Respublika) is a political party in Transnistria. The party is affiliated with former Transnistrian President Igor Smirnov.

In the legislative elections of 11 December 2005, the party won 13 of the 43 seats. The party failed to win a single seat in the 2010 legislative elections.

== Election results ==
Presidential elections
Election	Candidate	Votes	%	Rank	Outcome
2006	Igor Smirnov	212,384	83.9	1st	Elected

Supreme Council elections
Election	Seats	+/–	Government
2005	13 / 43		Opposition
2010	0 / 43	▼13	Extra-parliamentary
