= Yevgeny Shevchuk =

President of Transnistria from 2011 to 2016

- Евгений Шевчук
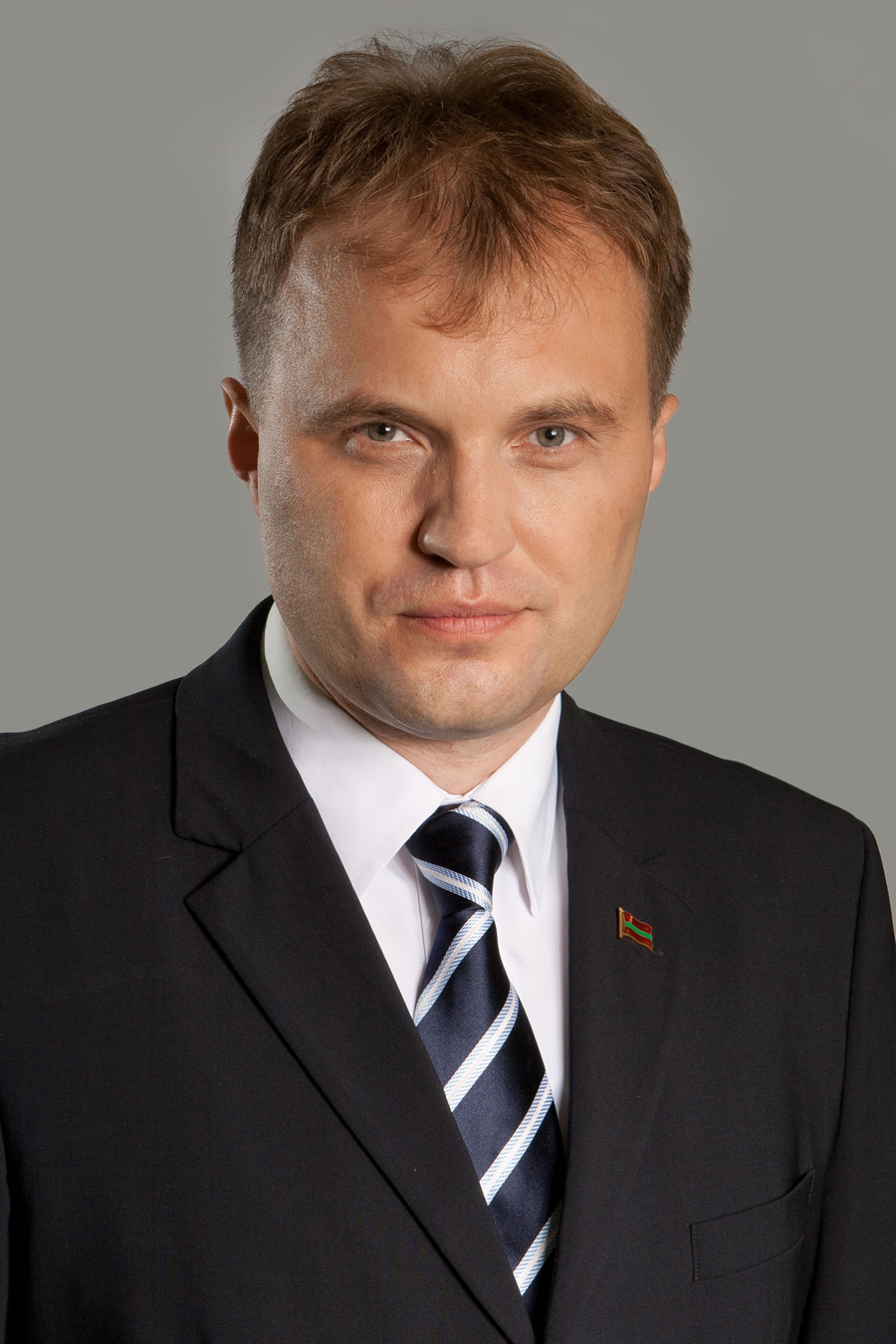
- Shevchuk in 2012

2nd President of Transnistria
- In office 30 December 2011 – 16 December 2016
- Prime Minister: Pyotr Stepanov; Tatiana Turanskaya; Maija Parnas (Acting); Tatiana Turanskaya; Maija Parnas (Acting); Pavel Prokudin
- Preceded by: Igor Smirnov
- Succeeded by: Vadim Krasnoselsky

Speaker of the Supreme Council
- In office 28 December 2005 – 8 July 2009
- President: Igor Smirnov
- Preceded by: Grigore Mărăcuță
- Succeeded by: Anatoliy Kaminski

Personal details
- Born: Yevgeny Vasylovych Shevchuk; 19 June 1968 (age 58) Rîbnița, Moldavian SSR, Soviet Union (present-day Moldova) (Note: Claimed by Transnistria, which is only recognised by Abkhazia and South Ossetia)
- Citizenship: Transnistria; Russia
- Party: Independent
- Spouse: Nina Shtanski
- Education: Transnistria State University; All-Russian Academy of Foreign Trade; Ukrainian Agricultural Academy

Yevgeny Vasilyevich Shevchuk (Note: Russian: Евгений Васильевич Шевчук, romanized: Yevgeniy Vasilyevich Shevchuk, Ukrainian: Євген Васильович Шевчук, romanized: Yevhen Vasylovych Shevchuk, Romanian: Evgheni Șevciuc, Moldovan Cyrillic: Евгени Васильевичь Шевчюк) (born 19 June 1968) is a Transnistrian former politician who served as the second President of Transnistria, from 2011 to 2016.

He was a deputy to the Supreme Soviet of Transnistria from 2000 until his election as president in 2011. Furthermore, he was speaker of Pridnestrovian Supreme Soviet from 2005 to 2009 and the leader of the political party Obnovlenie until 2010. Shevchuk is an ethnic Ukrainian and a citizen of both Transnistria and Russia.

In 2017, Shevchuk fled to Moldova while being pursued on criminal charges. In December 2018, he was sentenced in absentia to 16 years in prison and a fine of about 36 million US dollars.

== Early life ==
Yevgeny was born in Rîbnița, Moldavian SSR, Soviet Union (now Transnistria, Moldova). He is a lawyer who has worked in government and private business. His biography profile describes him as a "social democratic technocrat with a European outlook, and a man of profound democratic beliefs".

== Politics ==
As part of the minority opposition in parliament prior to December 2005, he spearheaded a reform drive by his party to introduce changes to Transnistria's electoral code. Among the changes were a requirement that purely technical qualifications be used as the basis for selecting polling station chairmen and a rule prohibiting state-owned media outlets (radio, TV, newspapers, etc.) from publishing results of polls and forecasts related to elections, so as to not influence free voter choice. This was reported in the United States State Department's Country Report on Human Rights Practices 2005.

In a 2005 report the Parliamentary Assembly of the Council of Europe referred to Shevchuk in the context of democratic reform, noting that Transnistria "is moving towards more pluralism" and highlighted "the Transnistrian parliament's own initiatives on the reform of the political system" which were spearheaded by Shevchuk's bloc. After that the European Parliament banned Shevchuk from entry to the EU countries.

On 22 July 2009, Shevchuk resigned from his post as speaker of parliament. Anatoliy Kaminski, who was vice-speaker under Shevchuk and is vice chairman of Shevchuk's Obnovlenie party, was the only nominee to succeed him. Mikhail Burla, leader of Obnovlenie and Chairman of the Committee for economic policy, budget and finance, was elected as the new vice-speaker. Shevchuk cited a controversial attempt to revise the county's constitution by president Igor Smirnov as the main reason for his resignation.

== Presidency ==
In December 2011, Shevchuk was elected president of Transnistria. He won the first round of the presidential elections on 11 December, polling higher than either the sitting president Igor Smirnov or the Kremlin-backed Supreme Soviet chairman Anatoliy Kaminski. He then won the second round of voting with over 75% support on 25 December. He was inaugurated on 30 December 2011.

On 7 September 2016, Shevchuk issued the Decree No. 348 "On the implementation of the results of the republican referendum held on 17 September 2006" in order to possibilitate a possible future annexation of Transnistria by Russia and to synchronize Transnistrian laws with Russian ones.

He was defeated for re-election in 2016.

== Post-presidency ==
On 28 June 2017, the parliament of Transnistria voted to remove Shevchuk's immunity from prosecution in connection with five pending criminal cases against the former President. Prior to this, on the evening of 27 June, Shevchuk crossed the border into Moldova. Shevchuk claimed that he crossed from PMR to Moldova in a taxi, whilst Russian-language media and certain PMR officials reported that he sailed across the Dnestr in a boat. On 30 June, Moldovan officials stated that they would not hand Shevchuk over to Transnistria.

Transnistria issued an arrest warrant for Shevchuk at the end of November 2017.

Later criminal cases count was raised up to six. Shevchuk is accused of corruption, smuggling, abuse of power, misappropriation of state money in especially large amounts, as well as unreasonable delay in the payment of pensions and salaries. In total, Shevchuk faced up to 12 years in prison.

On 21 December 2018, Shevchuk was sentenced in absentia by the Supreme Court to 16 years in prison and a fine of 600 million ruble (about 36 million US dollars). The Supreme Court also denied Shevchuk state awards and banned him from holding public office for five years after his release. According to media reports, Shevchuk was in Russia.

== Notes ==
Political offices
Preceded by Grigore Mărăcuță	Speaker of the Supreme Council; 2005–2009	Succeeded by Anatoliy Kaminski
Preceded by Igor Smirnov	President of Transnistria; 2011–2016	Succeeded by Vadim Krasnoselsky
