= Supreme Council (Transnistria) =

Parliament of Transnistria

Supreme Council of the Pridnestrovian Moldavian Republic Sovietul Suprem al RMN Советул Супрем ал РМН Верховный Совет ПМР Верховна Рада ПМР

Type
- Type: Unicameral

History
- Founded: 24 December 1995

Leadership
- Chairwoman: Tatyana Zalevskaya, Obnovlenie since 4 December 2025

Structure
- Seats: 33
- Political groups: Obnovlenie (33)

Elections
- First election: 24 December 1995
- Last election: 30 November 2025
- Next election: 30 November 2029

Meeting place
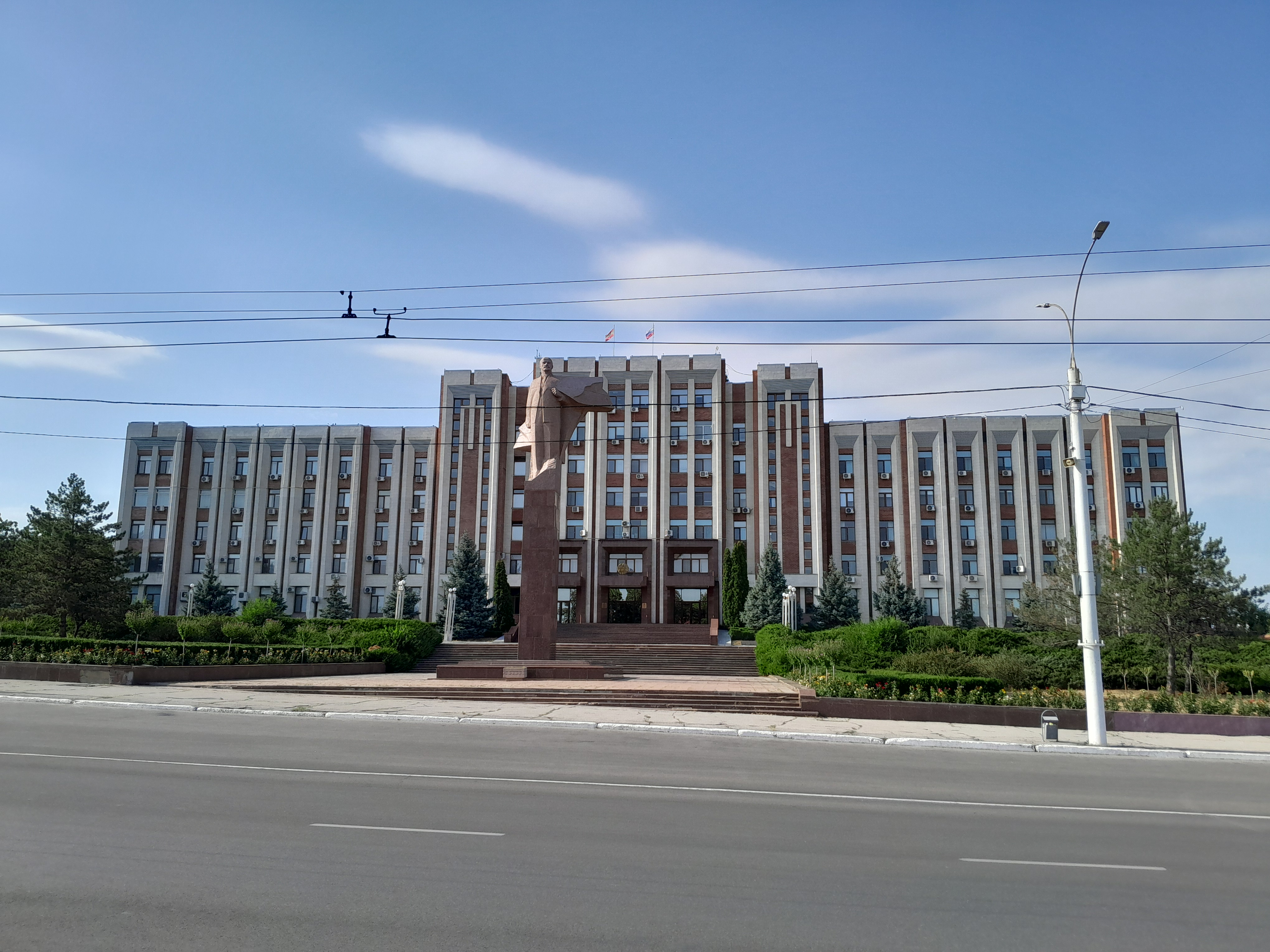
- Supreme Council Building, Tiraspol, Transnistria

Website
- en.vspmr.org

The Supreme Council of the Pridnestrovian Moldavian Republic (Note: Romanian: Sovietul Suprem al Republicii Moldovenești Nistrene, Moldovan Cyrillic: Советул Супрем ал Републичий Молдовенешть Нистрене; Russian: Верховный Совет Приднестровской Молдавской Республики, romanized: Verkhovnyy Sovet Pridnestrovskoy Moldavskoy Respubliki; Ukrainian: Верховна Рада Придністровської Молдавської Республіки, romanized: Verkhovna Rada Prydnistrovs'koyi Moldavs'koyi Respubliky) is the unicameral legislature of the internationally-unrecognised state of Transnistria. It consists of 33 seats, all of which are determined by single mandate constituencies and is headed by a chairman (or speaker).

== History ==
The Republic of Moldova still considers Transnistria to be part of its territory, although the Second Congress of People's Deputies declared separation from the Soviet Socialist Republic of Moldova on 2 September 1990 as the Pridnestrovian Moldavian Soviet Socialist Republic. As Transnistria was not an autonomous region before the declaration of its independence, it had no government bodies of its own in the Soviet Union. This meant that all government authorities had to be formed from scratch.

On 2 September 1990, the Second Extraordinary Congress of People's Deputies of all levels of Transnistria elected the Provisional Supreme Council of Transnistria, which was tasked to prepare elections to the permanent Supreme Council. Igor Smirnov was elected chairman of the Provisional Supreme Council in March 1990. After Smirnov was elected Chairman of the Republic (later this post was transformed into the presidential office) on 29 November 1990 he was succeeded by Vladimir Gonchar.

On 25 November 1990, the first legislative elections to the Supreme Council of PMR took place in Transnistria. The first Supreme Council was bicameral: it consisted of two chambers – the Council of the Republic and the Council of Nationalities. The Supreme Council was elected for a five-year term and consisted of 64 deputies. On 30 January 1991, the Supreme Council elected native-born Transnistrian of Moldovan origin Grigore Mărăcuță as its chairman.

After referendum in 1995 and the adoption of the second Constitution of Transnistria, the composition of the Supreme Council changed. The Council of the Republic was replaced by the Chamber of Legislators and the Council of Nationalities by the Chamber of Representatives. The second Supreme Council was elected for a five-year term and consisted of 67 deputies (32 in the lower house and 35 in the upper house). Elections to the second Supreme Council took place on 24 December 1995.

In 2000 amendments were made in the Constitution of PMR leading to new change in the organization of the Supreme Council. It became unicameral and consisted of 43 deputies.

Until 2005, the chairman of the parliament was Grigore Mărăcuță, but following the election victory of the opposition party Obnovlenie the new chairman became Obnovlenie party leader Yevgeny Shevchuk.

In 2009, President Igor Smirnov set up a commission to draft a new constitution. On 22 July 2009, Shevchuk resigned as speaker and was succeeded by Russian-born ethnic Ukrainian Anatoly Kaminski, also from Obnovlenie. Shevchuk cited the newly proposed constitution as a major factor as to why he resigned. He defeated both Smirnov and his former colleague Kaminski in the 2011 presidential elections. Following his defeat in the elections Kaminski resigned both as speaker and as head of Obnovlenie. He was succeeded by Mikhail Burla, an ethnic Ukrainian.

== Members of parliament ==
Most of the members of parliament are native-born Transnistrians. According to official PMR data, 22 of the 43 members of the parliament were born in PMR, while four were born in Moldova, seven were born in Russia, six in Ukraine and four did not declare.

== List of speakers ==
- Igor Smirnov (November 1990)
- Vladimir Gonchar (November 1990 – January 1991; acting)
- Grigore Mărăcuță (1991–2005)
- Yevgeny Shevchuk (2005–2009)
- Anatoly Kaminski (2009–2012)
- Mikhail Burla (13 June 2012 – 23 December 2015)
- Vadim Krasnoselski (23 December 2015 – 14 December 2016)
- Alexander Shcherba (14 December 2016 – 6 February 2019)
- Alexander Korshunov (6 February 2019 – 4 December 2025)
- Tatyana Zalevskaya (4 December 2025 – present)
