= List of political parties in Transnistria =

The following is a list of political parties in Transnistria. Transnistria has a de jure multi-party system, but most parties there have some ideological similarities, which are frowned upon heavily by Western election observers and human rights organisations, making it a polity with a de facto dominant-party system.

== Political parties ==
=== Active parties ===
Parties which are either represented in parliament, or are actively fielding candidates in parliamentary elections.

- Obnovlenie – registered in 2000, governing party since 2005
- Transnistrian Communist Party (PKP) – registered in 2003

=== Defunct or inactive parties ===
Parties and political organizations which have been disbanded or are no longer fielding candidates in parliamentary elections.

- Communist Party of Transnistria (KPP)
- Fair Republic – founded on 3 July 2007
- For Accord and Stability
- Liberal Democratic Party of Transnistria (LDPP) – registered in 2006
- Movement for the Development of the Dniester
- Patriotic Party of Transnistria – registered in 2006
- People's Will – registered in 2006
- Position
- Power to the People
- Republic – registered in 2007
- Return
- Proriv – registered in 2006
- Social Democratic Party of Transnistria – registered in 2007
- Union of Patriotic Forces
- United Work Collective Council
- Unity

== See also ==
- List of political parties in Moldova
- Lists of political parties
