= Patriot Party =

Patriot Party or Patriotic Party may refer to:

== United States ==
- Patriot Party (1970s), a socialist organization
- Patriot Party (1990s), another name for the United Citizens Party during the 1990s
- Patriot Party (hypothetical United States party), a hypothetical political party proposed by Donald Trump
- White Patriot Party, in the United States (1980–1987)

== Canada ==
- British Columbia Patriot Party, in Canada
- Parti patriote, in Canada

== United Kingdom ==
- Patriot Whigs, in the United Kingdom (1725)
- Patriotic Party (UK) (1964)

== Others ==
- Aruban Patriotic Party
- Belarusian Patriotic Party
- Irish Patriot Party
- National Patriotic Party, in Liberia
- New Patriotic Party, in Ghana
- Patriot Party (Armenia)
- Patriot Party (Indonesia)
- Patriotic Party, in the Polish–Lithuanian Commonwealth (1788–1792)
- Patriotic Party (Guatemala), in Guatemala
- Patriotic Party (Turkey)
- Patriotic Party of Transnistria
- Patriotic Renovation Party, in Honduras
- Patriottentijd, in the Netherlands
