= 1996 Transnistrian presidential election =

← 1991	22 December 1996	2001 →
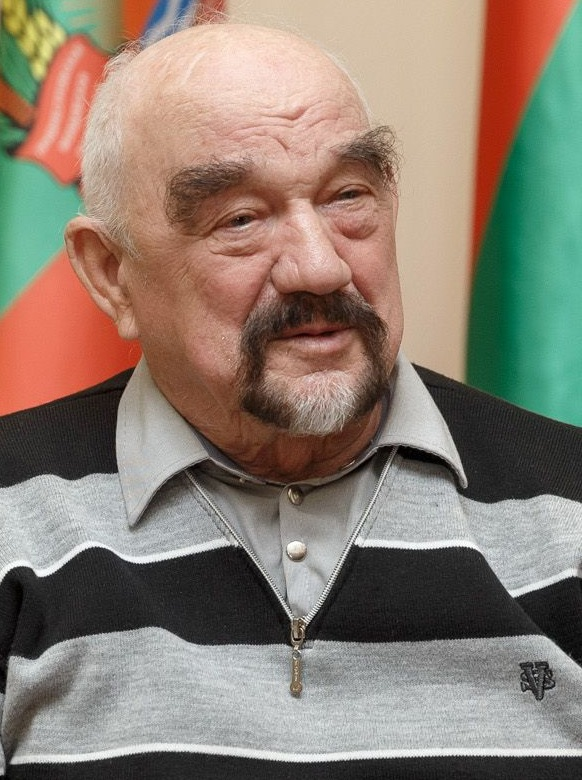
Nominee	Igor Smirnov	Vladimir Malakhov
Party	Independent	Independent
Running mate	Alexandru Caraman	Vasily Protsenko
Percentage	71.94%	19.84%
President before election
Igor Smirnov
Independent
Elected President
Igor Smirnov
Independent

Presidential elections were held in the breakaway republic of Transnistria on 22 December, 1996. They were won by the incumbent Igor Smirnov, who ruled Transnistria since 1991. Smirnov's only opponent was Vladimir Malakhov, who was beaten by Smirnov, 72% to 20%.

On 2 November, it was reported that Transnistria's central electoral commission had registered only two candidates for the election. Six others, including head of the Tiraspol city council Vitalii Glebov, were unable to collect the necessary 10,000 signatures.

Before the election, Malakhov claimed that his campaign was receiving "unequal treatment" from the media. He was considering withdrawing from the race, which would invalidate the election, the constitution requiring at least 2 candidates for the election to be able to occur. However, the Parliament of Transnistria amended the constitution, so that Smirnov could get elected unopposed. Malakhov then decided to continue his campaign.

== Results ==
Summary of the 22 December 1996 Transnistrian presidential election results
Candidate	Vice-pres. candidate	Votes	%
Igor Smirnov	Alexandru Caraman		71.94
Vladimir Malakhov	Vasily Protsenko		19.84
None of the above, blank or invalid			8.22
Total (turnout 57.1%)			100.0%
Sources: Olvia Press – Transnistrian press agency Archived 2011-07-13 at the Wayback Machine Open Media Research Institute

According to an article by the ethnic Russian researcher from Moldova Alla Skvortsova from 2002, "polls and elections in the PMR may to some extent have been rigged".
