= W.A.K.O. World Championships (Dublin) 2011 =

Kickboxing event in Ireland

W.A.K.O. World Championships 2011 (Dublin)
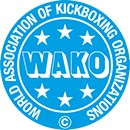
- The poster for W.A.K.O. World Championships 2011 (Dublin)
- Promotion: W.A.K.O.
- Date: November 21–26, 2011
- City: Dublin, Ireland

The WAKO World Championships 2011 for Semi Contact (SC), Full Contact (FC) and Musical Forms (MF) were held in Dublin, Ireland, from November 21 to November 26, 2011. The event was organized by the World Association of Kickboxing Organizations (WAKO).

== Disciplines ==
=== Semi Contact (SC) ===
A point-based discipline focused on speed, accuracy, and control. Bouts are stopped after scoring techniques, with an emphasis on technical execution rather than power.

=== Full Contact (FC) ===
A continuous fighting style allowing full-power punches and kicks above the waist. Competitors aim to win by points, referee stoppage, or knockout.

=== Musical Forms (MF) ===
A non-contact discipline where athletes perform choreographed routines inspired by martial arts techniques, with or without weapons. Judging is based on technique, creativity, and presentation.

== Full Contact ==
=== Women ===
Event	Gold	Silver	Bronze
-48 kg	Valeria Calabrese; Italy	Maria Krivoshapkina; Russia	Yamile Castillo; Germany
-48 kg	Valeria Calabrese; Italy	Maria Krivoshapkina; Russia	Vira Makresova; Ukraine
-52 kg	Monika Markowska; Great Britain	Zaneta Ciesla; Poland	Valentina Filatova; Russia
-52 kg	Monika Markowska; Great Britain	Zaneta Ciesla; Poland	Johanna Schafberg; Germany
-56 kg	Tonje Sorlie; Norway	Nadiya Khayenok; Ukraine	Andie Du Plessis; South Africa
-56 kg	Tonje Sorlie; Norway	Nadiya Khayenok; Ukraine	Polina Sergomanova; Russia
-60 kg	Fam Elgan; Norway	Kinga Siwa; Poland	Christa Alberts; South Africa
-60 kg	Fam Elgan; Norway	Kinga Siwa; Poland	Gozde Bayergi; Turkey
-65 kg	Nicole Trimmel; Austria	Ksenia Miroshnichenko; Russia	Cathrine Fonnes; Norway
-65 kg	Nicole Trimmel; Austria	Ksenia Miroshnichenko; Russia	Anne Katas; Finland
-70 kg	Irina Gavrilova; Russia	Ewa Brodnicka; Poland	Katy Wasiukiewicz; Great Britain
-70 kg	Irina Gavrilova; Russia	Ewa Brodnicka; Poland	Helena Jurisic; Croatia
+70 kg	Anja Renfordt; Germany	Anna Gladkikh; Russia	Denitsa Koleva; Bulgaria
+70 kg	Anja Renfordt; Germany	Anna Gladkikh; Russia	Adele Rootman; South Africa

=== Men ===
Event	Gold	Silver	Bronze
-51 kg	Alexey Trifonov; Russia	Wojciech Peryt; Poland	Azamat Zhalmuckhanov; Kazakhstan
-51 kg	Alexey Trifonov; Russia	Wojciech Peryt; Poland	Ivan Sciolla; Italy
-54 kg	Ramazan Razakov; Russia	Artem Skobchenko; Ukraine	Guillaume Ozzun; France
-54 kg	Ramazan Razakov; Russia	Artem Skobchenko; Ukraine	Ruslan Bayazitov; Kazakhstan
-57 kg	Huseyin Dundar; Turkey	Alemzihan Kudaibergenov; Kazakhstan	Damian Lawniczak; Poland
-57 kg	Huseyin Dundar; Turkey	Alemzihan Kudaibergenov; Kazakhstan	Ahmad Mohammad; Jordan
-60 kg	Aday Ali; Jordan	Kamel Bacha; France	Alexey Tukhtarov; Russia
-60 kg	Aday Ali; Jordan	Kamel Bacha; France	Artur Cieciura; Poland
-63.5 kg	Kostyantyn Demoretskyy; Ukraine	Sergey Lipinets; Russia	Gabor Gorbics; Hungary
-63.5 kg	Kostyantyn Demoretskyy; Ukraine	Sergey Lipinets; Russia	Teemu Tuominen; Finland
-67 kg	Samat Kadyrbekov; Kazakhstan	Davyd Ahakhanov; Ukraine	Niall McDermot; Ireland
-67 kg	Samat Kadyrbekov; Kazakhstan	Davyd Ahakhanov; Ukraine	Jarkko Jussila; Finland
-71 kg	Brian Brosnan; Ireland	Stelyan Avramidi; Kazakhstan	Mykola Osobskyi; Ukraine
-71 kg	Brian Brosnan; Ireland	Stelyan Avramidi; Kazakhstan	Eduard Spakov; Lithuania
-75 kg	Yusup Magomedbekov; Russia	Artur Reis; Germany	Azamat Nurpeissov; Kazakhstan
-75 kg	Yusup Magomedbekov; Russia	Artur Reis; Germany	Ekrem Kizilkus; Turkey
-81 kg	Gianluca Stitzer; Italy	Kevin Thomas; France	Igor Prykhodko; Ukraine
-81 kg	Gianluca Stitzer; Italy	Kevin Thomas; France	Ivan Zakharanko; Kazakhstan
-86 kg	Dzhafar Asadov; Russia	Yerseit Kalmenov; Kazakhstan	Reinis Porozov; Latvia
-86 kg	Dzhafar Asadov; Russia	Yerseit Kalmenov; Kazakhstan	Stevie Dement; Puerto Rico
-91 kg	Eugen Waigel; Germany	Stepan Krupin; Russia	Aleksandr Beliaziun; Lithuania
-91 kg	Eugen Waigel; Germany	Stepan Krupin; Russia	Mirko Gabor; Hungary
+91 kg	Hamza Kendircioglu; Turkey	Ivan Tkachenko; Ukraine	Damir Tovarovic; Croatia
+91 kg	Hamza Kendircioglu; Turkey	Ivan Tkachenko; Ukraine	Wojciech Jastrzebski; Poland

== Semi Contact ==
=== Men ===
Event	Gold	Silver	Bronze
-57 kg	Laszlo Varga; Hungary	Ashley St Mart; Ireland	Viacheslav Shcherbakov; Russia
-57 kg	Laszlo Varga; Hungary	Ashley St Mart; Ireland	Vincenzo Gagliardi; Italy
-63 kg	Adriano Passaro; Italy	Des Leonard; Ireland	Wietse Goijens; Belgium
-63 kg	Adriano Passaro; Italy	Des Leonard; Ireland	Richard Veres; Hungary
-69 kg	Alex Veres; Hungary	Domenico De Marco; Italy	Timmy Sarantoudis; Germany
-69 kg	Alex Veres; Hungary	Domenico De Marco; Italy	Konstantinos Tampoureas; Greece
-74 kg	Laszlo Gombos; Hungary	Egor Ryabchikov; Russia	Jens Poppe; Belgium
-74 kg	Laszlo Gombos; Hungary	Egor Ryabchikov; Russia	Morten Spissoy; Norway
-79 kg	Zsolt Moradi; Hungary	Robbie McMenamy; Ireland	Andy Dunn; Great Britain
-79 kg	Zsolt Moradi; Hungary	Robbie McMenamy; Ireland	Aleksander Docic; Slovenia
-84 kg	Andreas Aggelopoulos; Greece	Emanoil Dimitrov; Bulgaria	Bjorn Van; Belgium
-84 kg	Andreas Aggelopoulos; Greece	Emanoil Dimitrov; Bulgaria	Dmitry Iakovlev; Russia
-89 kg	Drew Neal; Great Britain	Alexander Gleixner; Germany	Tamas Imre; Hungary
-89 kg	Drew Neal; Great Britain	Alexander Gleixner; Germany	Giuseppe De Marco; Italy
-94 kg	Krisztian Jaroszkievicz; Hungary	Paolo Niceforo; Italy	Ross Levine; United States
-94 kg	Krisztian Jaroszkievicz; Hungary	Paolo Niceforo; Italy	Alexandr Glushkov; Russia
+94 kg	Pero Gazilj; Croatia	Chris Aston; Great Britain	Günther Wohlwend; Liechtenstein
+94 kg	Pero Gazilj; Croatia	Chris Aston; Great Britain	Michel Decian; Switzerland
Teamfight	Team Italy; Italy	Team Hungary; Hungary	Team Great Britain; Great Britain
Teamfight	Team Italy; Italy	Team Hungary; Hungary	Team Ireland; Ireland

=== Women ===
Event	Gold	Silver	Bronze
-50 kg	Giulia Cavallaro; Italy	Mercedesz Veres; Hungary	Evgenia Poletova; Russia
-50 kg	Giulia Cavallaro; Italy	Mercedesz Veres; Hungary	Sharon Gill; Great Britain
-55 kg	Luisa Gullotti; Italy	Eirin Dale; Norway	Vasiliki Mitropoulou; Greece
-55 kg	Luisa Gullotti; Italy	Eirin Dale; Norway	Nelly Hannicz; Hungary
-60 kg	Chelsey Nash; Canada	Gloria De Bei; Italy	Shauna Bannon; Ireland
-60 kg	Chelsey Nash; Canada	Gloria De Bei; Italy	Svetlana Fadeeva; Russia
-65 kg	Adrienn Kadas; Hungary	Blanka Sindlerova; Czech Republic	Ina Grindheim; Norway
-65 kg	Adrienn Kadas; Hungary	Blanka Sindlerova; Czech Republic	Ana Znaor; Croatia
-70 kg	Bev Sturzaker; Great Britain	Henrietta Nagy; Hungary	Maria Semenova; Russia
-70 kg	Bev Sturzaker; Great Britain	Henrietta Nagy; Hungary	Alicia Bianco; United States
+70 kg	Irina Murashova; Russia	Anna Kondar; Hungary	Marion Sand; Germany
+70 kg	Irina Murashova; Russia	Anna Kondar; Hungary	Patrizia Berlingieri; Switzerland

== Semi Contact Veterans ==
=== Veteran Men ===
Event	Gold	Silver	Bronze
-63 kg	Jean Philippe; France	Daz Ellis; Great Britain	Massimo Ragusa; Italy
-74 kg	Piotr Siegoczynski; Poland	Eamon Breslin; Ireland	Marco Lanzilao; Italy
-74 kg	Piotr Siegoczynski; Poland	Eamon Breslin; Ireland	Frederick Lapan; United States
-84 kg	Christopher Rappold; United States	Altaceste Baptista; Brazil	Giovanni Sgrilletti; Germany
-84 kg	Christopher Rappold; United States	Altaceste Baptista; Brazil	Luigi Lubrano; Italy
-94 kg	Frank Feuer; Germany	Ray Bryant; United States	Jannie Vreugdenburg; South Africa
-94 kg	Frank Feuer; Germany	Ray Bryant; United States	Martin Bannon; Ireland
+94 kg	Dennis Molloy; United States	Paul Coffey; Ireland	Ronnie Thompson; South Africa
+94 kg	Dennis Molloy; United States	Paul Coffey; Ireland	Jason Bowers; Great Britain

=== Veteran Women ===
Event	Gold	Silver	Bronze
-55 kg	Rehana Mia; South Africa	Louise Therrien; United States	
+65 kg	Ruth Nelson; Great Britain	Trisha Bannon; Ireland	Trixie Dumas; United States
+65 kg	Ruth Nelson; Great Britain	Trisha Bannon; Ireland	Sakina Morat; South Africa
