= Brosnahan =

Brosnahan (Irish: Ó Brosnacháin) is an Irish surname. This surname is derived from the place of Brosna, County Kerry, in Ireland. Notable people with the surname include:

- James D. Brosnahan (born 1963), American politician
- Maureen Brosnahan, Canadian journalist
- Rachel Brosnahan (born 1990), American actress
- Seán Brosnahan (1911–1987), Irish independent politician

== See also ==
- Brosnan, another Irish surname of the same derivation
- Brosnahan Island, an island of the Ross Dependency, Antarctica
- Kate Spade (born Katherine Noel Brosnahan)
