= Chairman of the Presidium of Pridnestrovia =

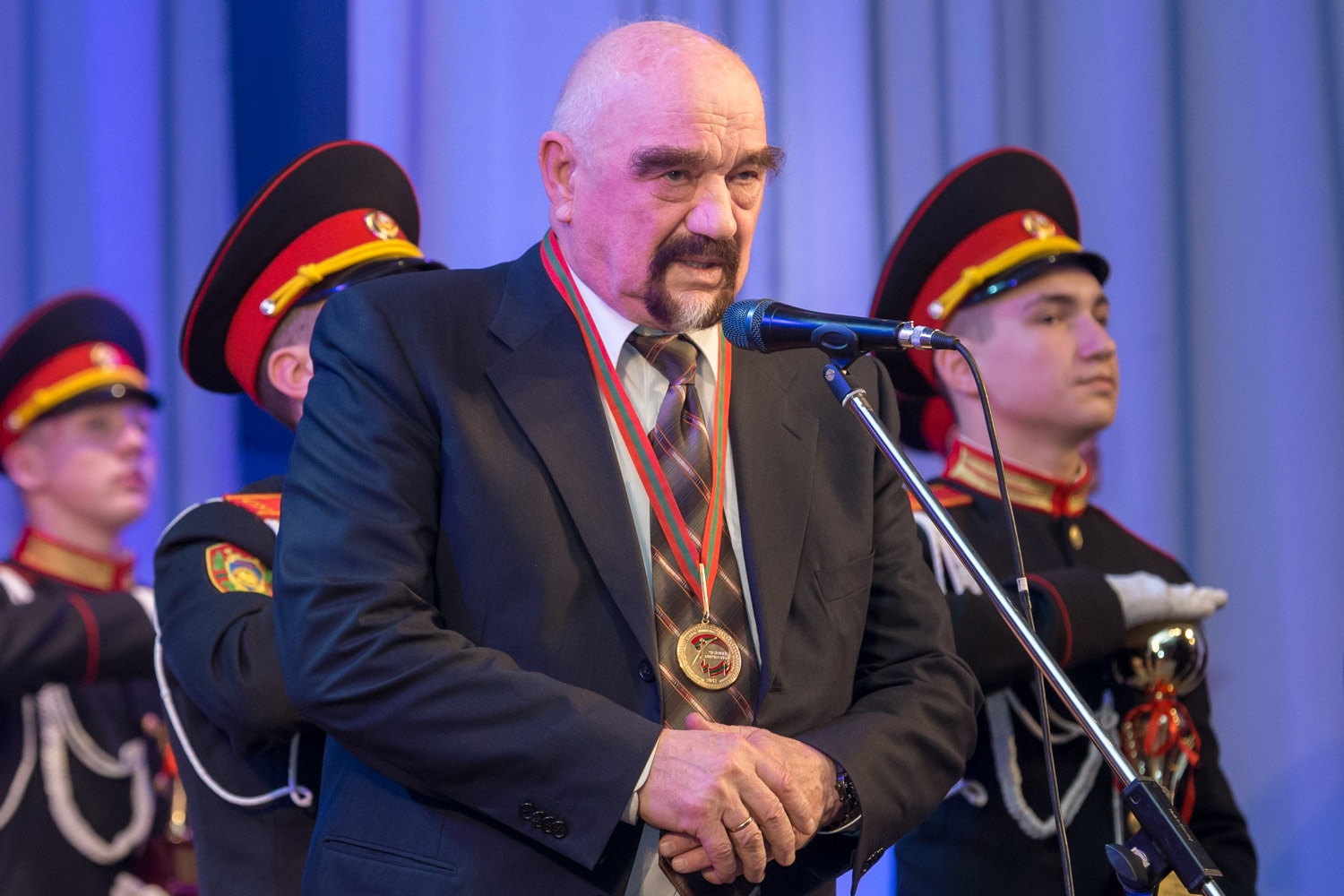
Former chairman Igor Smirnov

The Chairman of the Presidium of Pridnestrovia previously led the government of Transnistria from the time of its creation until the government was reorganized in late 1991.

On 2 September 1990, the Second Congress of People's Deputies from all levels of Transnistrian Government (II съезд народных депутатов всех уровней Приднестровья) proclaimed the creation of the Pridnestrovian Moldovan Soviet Socialist Republic (PMSSR). A fifty-member Provisional Supreme Soviet (legislative body) and an eighteen-member Presidium were elected from the delegates to carry forward Transnistrian sovereignty from the Republic of Moldova.

Point six of the same resolution that created the Pridnestrovian Moldovan SSR also expressed the will of the delegates that Igor Smirnov, heretofore chairman of the Tiraspol city soviet, lead the Supreme Soviet as its chairman.

With the dissolution of the Soviet Union, whose government never recognized the PMSSR as a constituent republic, the now Pridnestrovian Moldovan Republic (PMR) was reorganized into a presidential republic. The Supreme Soviet survived as the legislative organ of government. However, in this new arrangement the Presidium was absent, its powers going to the republic's new executive branch, the office of the president. On 3 December 1991, Igor Smirnov won an election to become president of the PMR. He continued to serve in office until 30 December 2011.

== Chairman of the Presidium ==
Term n°	Name	Lifespan	Took office	Left office	Party
1	Igor Smirnov	23 October 1941 (age 83)	3 September 1990	29 November 1990	None
2	Igor Smirnov	23 October 1941 (age 83)	29 November 1990	29 August 1991	None
— (Acting)	Andrey Manoylov	15 October 1945 – 14 September 1995 (aged 49)	29 August 1991	1 October 1991	None
3	Igor Smirnov	23 October 1941 (age 83)	1 October 1991	3 December 1991	None

== See also ==
- Parliament of Transnistria
- President of Transnistria
