= Zenovich =

Zenovich is a surname. Notable people with the surname include:

- George N. Zenovich (1922–2013), American politician and jurist
- Marina Zenovich, American filmmaker
- Matthew Zenovich (born 1994), New Zealand cyclist
- Tom Zenovich, Transnistrian politician
