= Andrey Manoylov =

Transnistrian politician (1945–1995)

- Андрей Манойлов
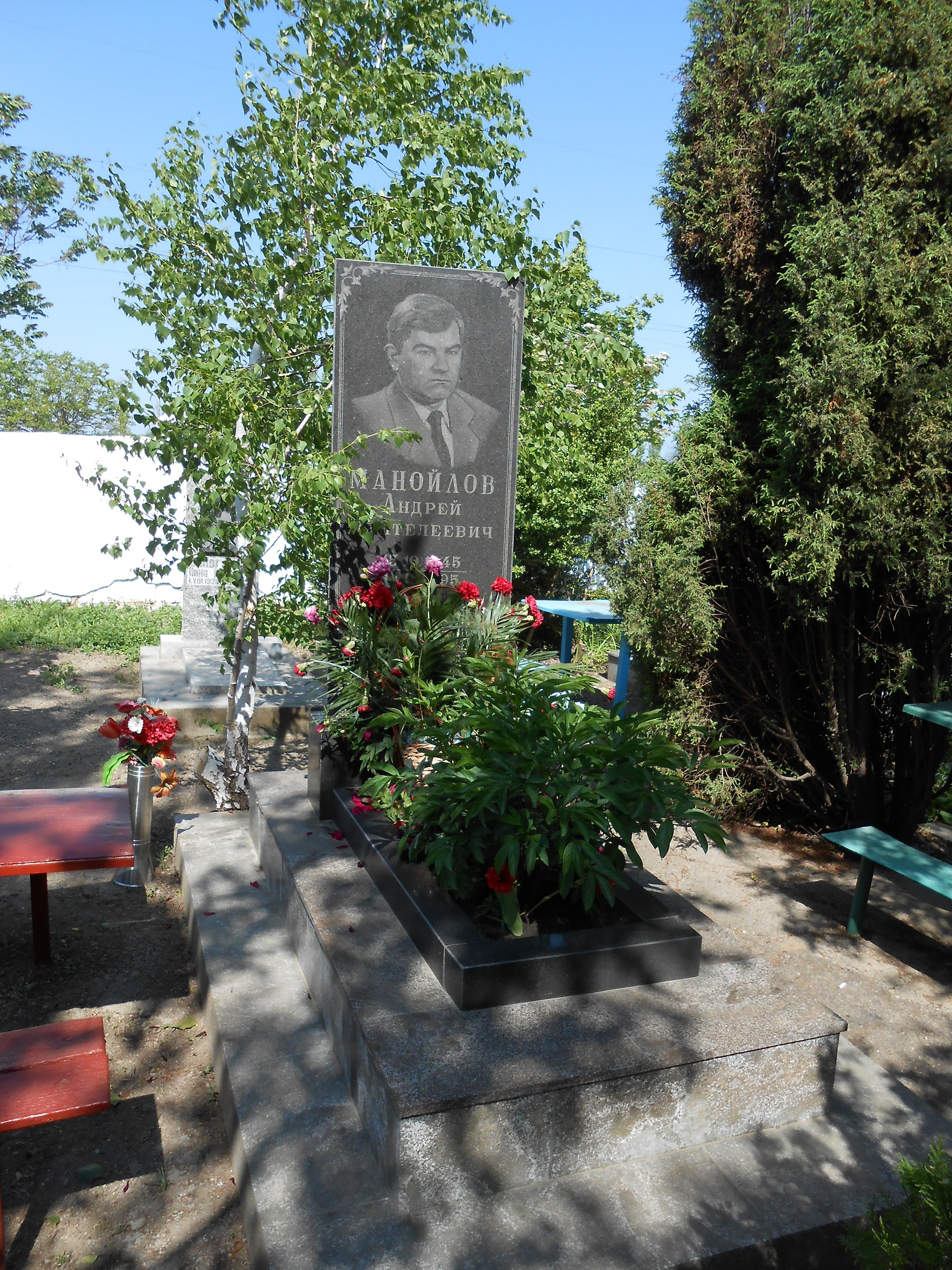

Chairman of the Presidium of Pridnestrovia
- In office 29 August 1991 – 1 October 1991
- Preceded by: Igor Smirnov
- Succeeded by: Igor Smirnov

Personal details
- Born: 15 October 1945 Tiraspol, Moldavian SSR, Soviet Union (Note: Now in Moldova. Claimed by Transnistria, which is only recognised by Abkhazia and South Ossetia)
- Died: 14 September 1995 (aged 49) Tiraspol, Moldova (Note: Claimed by Transnistria, which is only recognised by Abkhazia and South Ossetia)

Andrey Panteleyevich Manoylov (Russian: Андрей Пантелеевич Манойлов; Romanian: Andrei Manoilov; 15 October 1945 – 14 September 1995) was a Transnistrian politician, who served as the Acting Chairman of the unrecognized Pridnestrovian Moldavian Republic (PMR) from 29 August to 1 October 1991 in place of imprisoned Igor Smirnov.

Originally a driver, Manoylov took active part in the formation of the opposition "work collectives" during the standoff between local Transnistrian authorities and the central government of the Moldavian SSR in 1989–1990. He was an elected member of the Presidium of the United Work Collective Council until 1991, when he became Chairman of the State Control Committee of the PMR.

Manoylov died in 1995. A number of streets in Transnistria and a customs control post in Dubăsari were named after him.

== See also ==
- President of Transnistria
