= Time in Transnistria =

Time in Europe: Light Blue / Western European Time / Greenwich Mean Time (UTC); Blue / Western European Time / Greenwich Mean Time (UTC); Blue / Western European Summer Time / British Summer Time / Irish Standard Time (UTC+1); Red / Central European Time (UTC+1); Red / Central European Summer Time (UTC+2); Yellow / Eastern European Time / Kaliningrad Time (UTC+2); Ochre / Eastern European Time (UTC+2); Ochre / Eastern European Summer Time (UTC+3); Green / Moscow Time / Turkey Time (UTC+3); Turquoise / Armenia Time / Azerbaijan Time / Georgia Time / Samara Time (UTC+4); ▉▉▉▉ Pale colours: Standard time observed all year ▉▉▉ Dark colours: Summer time observed

Time in Transnistria (officially the Pridnestrovian Moldavian Republic), a breakaway state internationally recognised as being part of Moldova, is given by Eastern European Time (EET; UTC+02:00). Daylight saving time, which moves one hour ahead to UTC+03:00 is observed from the last Sunday in March to the last Sunday in October.

As Transnistria is not an internationally recognised sovereign state, it is not granted a zone.tab entry on the IANA time zone database.

== History ==
The government announced on 10 October 2011 that they would not be switching back from DST, after President Igor Smirnov signed a decree abolishing winter time. However, Smirnov changed his mind according to local media reports, and Transnistria continued observing both winter and summer time.

== See also ==
- Time in Europe
- List of time zones by country
- List of time zones by UTC offset
