= Brosnan =

Brosnan is a surname, derived from the Irish "Ó Brosnacháin," which may be derived from the place name Brosna in Kerry. Notable people with the surname include:

- Brian Brosnan, Irish boxer
- Chris Brosnan (born 1972), British film director, writer, and producer
- Ciara Nadine Brosnan (born 2011), Indonesian actress
- Cornelius M. Brosnan (1813–1867), Justice of the Supreme Court of Nevada
- D. William Brosnan (1903–1985), American railroad executive
- Eoin Brosnan, Irish Gaelic football player
- Jim Brosnan (1929–2014), American baseball player
- John Brosnan (1947–2005), Australian author
- John Brosnan (soldier) (1846–1921), Irish soldier who fought in the American Civil War
- Patrick Brosnan (born 1968), American mathematician
- Pierce Brosnan (born 1953), Irish actor
- Sarah Brosnan, American ethologist
- Seán Brosnan (1916–1979), Irish barrister and politician
- Steven Brosnan (born 1976), Australian rules footballer

== See also ==
- Brosnahan, another Irish surname of the same derivation
