= Fair Republic =

- Leader: Yuriy Gervasyuk
- Founded: 3 July 2007
- Ideology: Democratic socialism Transnistrian nationalism
- International affiliation: A Just Russia

Fair Republic (Russian: Справедли́вая Респýблика, romanized: Spravedlívaya Respúblika) is a Transnistrian political party, formed on 3 July 2007 by three members of the Supreme Council. The party claims to be a left-wing opposition party.

At the founding congress on 3 July 2007 the lawyer Yuriy Gervasyuk, member of the Transnistrian parliament was elected as chairman of the party. Galina Antyufeyeva, the chairperson of the parliamentary legislative committee and wife of security minister Vladimir Antyufeyev, also joined "Fair Pridnestrovie" as well as Valeri Ponomarenko. Ponomarenko is a newly elected member of the Transnistrian parliament, who stood as independent candidate against Igor Smirnov's daughter-in-law, Marina Smirnova, in a by-election in June 2007.

The party works closely with the Russian political party Fair Russia, which Gervasyuk stated "is ready to cooperate and support its Pridnestrovian colleagues." The party intends to combine socialism with patriotism and is in favor of an independent Transnistria.
