= 2006 Transnistrian presidential election =

← 2001	10 December 2006	2011 →
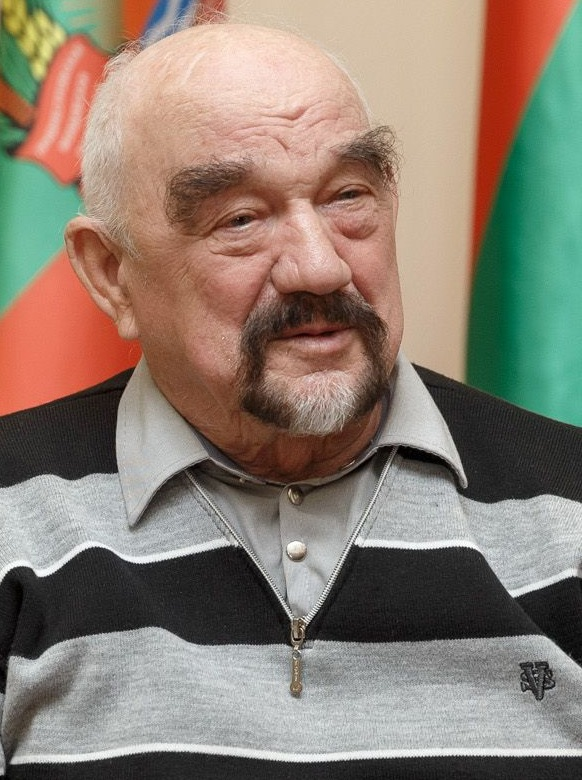
Nominee	Igor Smirnov	Nadezhda Bondarenko
Party	Republic	PKP
Running mate	Aleksandr Korolyov	Anatoliy Bazhen
Popular vote	212,384	20,902
Percentage	83.90%	8.26%
President before election
Igor Smirnov
Republic
Elected President
Igor Smirnov
Republic

Presidential elections were held in Transnistria on 10 December 2006. Incumbent President Igor Smirnov won despite opposition having stiffened during the final weeks of the campaign. Three candidates registered to run besides the incumbent Smirnov: Bender MP for Obnovlenie (Renewal) Peter Tomaily, Transnistrian Communist Party candidate Nadezhda Bondarenko and journalist Andrey Safonov.

== Background ==
Andrey Safonov's candidacy was at first rejected on the basis of insufficient and allegedly fraudulent signatures, but on 30 November the Tiraspol law court accepted it.

Despite the court ruling, at the Electoral Commission meeting on 27 November Safonov's registration was not accepted with some members claiming that the court decision needed to be challenged at a higher instance. The Commission finally allowed the candidacy on 5 December.

Starting with 7 December, early voting was allowed for those persons for whom it was impossible to come to the polls on 10 December.

== Conduct ==
Andrey Safonov, one of the opposition candidates, suggested that election results were rigged in favour of the incumbent leader. He claimed that there was a strange difference between the exit polls results and the official results. According to an article by the ethnic Russian researcher from Moldova Alla Skvortsova, "polls and elections in the PMR may to some extent have been rigged". Moreover, according to the 2004 Transnistrian census, only 90% of the population of Transnistria had Transnistrian citizenship.

== Results ==
Candidate	Running mate	Party	Votes	%
Igor Smirnov	Aleksandr Korolyov	Republic	212,384	83.90
Nadezhda Bondarenko	Anatoliy Bazhen	PKP	20,902	8.26
Andrey Safonov	Grigoriy Volov	Independent	10,162	4.01
Peter Tomaily	Aleksandr Korshunov	Independent	5,480	2.16
None of the above			4,216	1.67
Total			253,144	100.00
Valid votes			253,144	98.20
Invalid/blank votes			4,638	1.80
Total votes			257,782	100.00
Source: Regnum
