= Ivan Tkachenko =

Ivan Tkachenko may refer to:

- Ivan Tkachenko (ice hockey) (1979–2011), Russian ice hockey player
- Ivan Tkachenko (politician) (born 1964), Minister of Health and Social Security in Transnistria
