= Patriotic Party of Transnistria =

Patriotic Party of Transnistria Патриотическая партия Приднестровья
- Chairman: Oleg Smirnov
- Vice Chairmen: Sergey Novak; Marina Smirnova
- Founded: 4 August 2006
- Dissolved: 8 November 2012
- Headquarters: Tiraspol, Transnistria
- Newspaper: The Patriot
- Ideology: Transnistrian nationalism Pro-Smirnov
- International affiliation: A Just Russia
- Colors: Blue, White
- Slogan: "Social Justice, Freedom, Patriotism"

Party flag

Website
- patriot-pmr.org

The Patriotic Party of Transnistria (Russian: Патриотическая партия Приднестровья, romanized: Patrioticheskaya partiya Pridnestrovya) was a political party in Transnistria.

== History ==
The founding congress of the party was held on 4 August 2006, the most notable attendees of which were the Union of Defenders of Transnistria, the Union of Afghan War Veterans and the Women's League of Transnistria, all of which merged into one political party along with a few other smaller groups. The merger was encouraged by Oleg Smirnov, the son of then-President Igor Smirnov, and the party later elected him chairman in an uncontested vote. A political council with 33 members was also created during the congress.

In April 2010, the party agreed to a merger with another pro-Smirnov political party, the Republican Party (created on base of the Republic NGO), to form the Social-Patriotic Party of Transnistria. Vladimir Rylyakov, one of the leaders of the OSTK, became the leader of the new party.
