= Irina Molokanova =

Transnistrian politician

- Ирина Молоканова

Minister for Finance
- In office July 2007 – 24 July 2012

Minister for Finance
- In office 11 January 2016 – 29 December 2017

Personal details
- Born: Irina Ivanova Molokanova; 1957 (age 68–69)
- Education: Odesa National Polytechnic University

Irina Ivanova Molokanova (Russian: Ирина Ивановна Молоканова; Ukrainian: Ірина Іванівна Молоканова, romanized: Iryna Ivanivna Molokanova; born 1957) is a politician and economist, who studied at Odesa National Polytechnic University, graduating in 1980 with qualifications in engineering and economics. She was Minister of Finance for the Pridnestrovian Moldovan Republic on two occasions: from July 2007 to 24 January 2012 in the succeeding governments of Igor Smirnov and Yevgeny Shevchuk, and 11 January 2016 to 29 December 2017 under Shevchuk and Vadim Krasnoselsky. She has held a range of positions in the Transnistrian government, including as Director of the State Reserve Fund from 25 January to 30 November 2012.

== Awards ==
- 'For Labour Valour' Medal (1995)
- 'Impeccable Service' Medal (2001)
- 'Distinction in Labour' Medal (2007)
