= Alexander Radchenko =

Transnistrian politician (1943–2014)

- Александр Радченко

Member of the Supreme Council
- In office 1996–2005

Personal details
- Born: 1943 Soviet Union
- Died: 13 November 2014 (aged 70–71)
- Political party: Power to the People (1994–200?); Social Democratic Party (2007–2014)
- Awards: Order of Labour Glory; Medal in Defence of Transnistria

Alexander Grigorievich Radchenko (Russian: Александр Григорьевич Радченко; 1943 – 13 November 2014) was a Transnistrian politician and human rights activist. Born to an ethnic Ukrainian family during the Soviet era, he was a military officer until the breakup of the Soviet Union. He then became a state official and activist in the breakaway state of Transnistria, serving in the Supreme Council of Transnistria from 1996 to 2005. He was the founder of two small opposition parties, as well as a newspaper named Chelovek i ego prava (lit. 'Man and His Rights') that was critical of the Transnistrian government.

== Early life and career in the Red Army ==
Radchenko was born in 1943 to an ethnic Ukrainian family. He joined the Red Army in 1962 and served in various command and political positions until he was discharged into the reserve force in 1989. He then worked as a deputy head at the Tizar plant, before becoming a history and social sciences teacher. Radchenko had received the certifications for the latter job in 1984, after graduating from a specialized program at Odesa I. I. Mechnykov State University.

== Political activism in Transnistria ==
Amid the breakup of the Soviet Union (1988–1991) and growing calls for Moldovan independence, Radchenko began campaigning for the protection of human rights and freedoms in Transnistria. He began working in media as well, serving as editor-in-chief of the Transnistrian Radio Broadcasting Committee and the deputy chairman of the Transnistrian Committee on Television, Radio, and Press. For his efforts he was awarded the Order of Labour Glory and the Medal in Defence of Transnistria. He was also the founder of the newspaper Chelovek i ego prava (Человек и его права, 'Man and His Rights'), which was one of the only publications in Transnistria that were critical of the Transnistrian government.

In 1994, he founded the now-defunct political party Power to the People (Власть народу). He was elected as a deputy of the Chamber of Legislators of the Supreme Council of Transnistria in the 1996 parliamentary election. He was reelected to the Supreme Council in the 2000 parliamentary election, after the body became unicameral. Radchenko also contested the 2001 Transnistrian presidential election, running against the incumbent Igor Smirnov and Tom Zenovich. Of the three candidates, he came last with just under five per cent of the votes.

Radchenko encouraged Transnistrians to participate in the 2001 Moldovan parliamentary election and campaigned for the Party of Communists of the Republic of Moldova. The Transnistrian Minister of Justice consequently accused him of crimes against the state, claiming he was advocating the restoration of Moldovan control over Transnistria and, therefore, the liquidation of the separate Transnistrian state. His party was twice banned for short periods.

On 25 January 2007, Radchenko founded the Social Democratic Party of Transnistria, the only political party in Transnistria which was in favour of conditional reintegration into Moldova.

He died on 13 November 2014 after a long battle with an unspecified illness.

== See also ==
- Nikolai Buchatskii
