= Orders, decorations, and medals of Transnistria =

Decorations, medals of the Republic of South Ossetia

The orders, decorations and medals of Transnistria is a system of state awards of the Pridnestrovian Moldavian Republic (Transnistria).

== Orders ==
Image	Name
	Order of the Republic
I степени II степени	Order of Merit
	Order of Suvorov
	Order of Personal Courage
	Order of Honor
	Order of Friendship
	Order of Labour Glory
I степени II степени III степени	Order "For Service to the Motherland in the Armed Forces of Transnistria"
	Order of the Mother Heroine

== Medals ==
Image	Name
	Medal in Defense of Transnistria
	Мedal of Bravery
	Medal for Labor Valor
	Medal "For Excellence in Labor"
	Order of Military Merit
	Medal "For Strengthening International Cooperation"
	Medal "For Impeccable Service"
	Medal "For Merit in the Peacekeeping Operation"
	Medal "To a participant of the peacekeeping operation in Transnistria"
	Medal "For excellent service in the maintenance of public order"
	Medal "For Courage in a Fire"
	Medal "For the rescue of drowning people"

=== Jubilee medals ===
Image	Name
	Medal "10 years of Transnistria"
	Medal "15 years of Transnistria"
	Medal "20 years of Transnistria"
	Medal "25 years of Transnistria"
	Medal "10 years of the Armed Forces of Transnistria"
	Medal "10 years of the Women's Movement of Transnistria
	Medal "10 years of the Ministry of State Security"
	Medal "10 years of Transnistrian Customs"
	Medal "15 years of Transnistrian Customs"
	Medal "15 years of Transnistrian Police"
	Medal "10 years of the Security Service"
	Medal "15 years of the Ministry of State Security"
	Medal "For Valiant Labor in the Great Patriotic War"
	Medal "60 years of Victory in the Great Patriotic War 1941-1945."
	Medal "60 years of the liberation of Tiraspol"
	Medal "65 years of Victory in the Great Patriotic War 1941-1945"
	Medal "70 years of Victory in the Great Patriotic War 1941-1945"
	Medal "600 years of the city of Bender"
	Medal "25 years to the Ministry of Foreign Affairs"

== Badges ==
Image	Name
	Badge for the Defence of Transnistria
	Badge "International Assistance"
	Honorary Donor of Transnistria
	10 years of the United Work Collective Council
	Medal "10 years of the Women's Movement of Transnistria
	Medal "15 years of the Women's Movement of Transnistria
	15 years since the Soviet withdrawal from Afghanistan
	"For the development of the Customs Service of Transnistria"
	"In memory of the Disaster at the Chernobyl Nuclear Power Plant. 25 years"
	30 years of Grigoriopol
	Badge of the Ministry of Foreign Affairs "For contribution to the development of international relations"

== Honored titles ==
- City of Military Glory (Bender and Dubăsari)
- Honored Worker of Public Education of Transnistria
- Honored Teacher of Transnistria
- Honored Worker of Physical Culture and Sports of Transnistria
- Honored Coach of Transnistria
- People's Artist of Transnistria
- Honored Artist of Transnistria
- Honored Worker of Culture of Transnistria
- Honored Master of Folk Art of Transnistria
- Honored Art Group of Transnistria
- Honored Doctor of Transnistria
- Honored Health Worker of Transnistria
- Honored Worker of Social Security of Transnistria
- Honored Lawyer of Transnistria
- Honored Economist of Transnistria
- Honored Military Pilot of Transnistria
- Honored Military Navigator of Transnistria
- Honored Military Specialist of Transnistria
- Honorary Officer of the Ministry of State Security of Transnistria
- Honored Employee of the Ministry of Internal Affairs of Transnistria
- Honored Employee of the Ministry of Justice of Transnistria
- Honored Officer of the Diplomatic Service of Transnistria
- Honored Employee of the Customs Authorities of Transnistria
- Honored Inventor of Transnistria
- Honored Innovator of Transnistria
- Honored Worker of Transnistria
- Laureate of the State Prize of Transnistria

== Other awards ==
- Diploma of the President of Transnistria
- Letter of thanks from the President of Transnistria
- Certificate of honor of the Government of Transnistria
- Gratitude from the Government of Transnistria
