= Vice President of Transnistria =

Second person in Transnistria

The vice president of Transnistria was a political position in that unrecognized state and was the deputy head of state. The vice president was elected concurrently with the president for a 5-year term through general elections. The position was abolished in 2011.

== Duties ==
The vice president was designated to assume the presidential duties in the event of the latter's incapacity. If the vice president was unable to fulfill these duties, they would be assumed by the chairman of the Supreme Council.

The extent of the vice president's powers was determined by the President of the PMR. Additionally, by virtue of their position, the vice president served as a member of the political coordination council (as outlined in Article 5 of the Law “On the Status of the President of the Pridnestrovian Moldavian Republic”). The final vice president, Alexander Korolev, also held the position of head of the Administration of the President of the PMR and secretary of the Security Council.

Following amendments to the constitution ratified by the Supreme Court in June 2011, the office of vice president was abolished. However, as per Article 4 of Constitutional Law No. 94-KZID-V of the PMR, the incumbent vice president retained their powers and position until a newly elected President of the PMR assumed office after the enactment of the Constitutional Law. Consequently, upon the inauguration of the newly elected President of the PMR on December 30, 2011, the position of vice president was officially abolished.

== List of holders ==
Vice President	President	Term start	Term end
Aleksandr Karaman	Igor Smirnov	December 1, 1991	December 9, 2001
Sergey Leontiev	Igor Smirnov	December 9, 2001	December 13, 2006
Aleksander Korolyov	Igor Smirnov	December 13, 2006	December 30, 2011
