= Nikolai Buchatskii =

Transnistrian politician and human rights activist

Nikolai Buchatskii is a human rights activist and opposition politician in Transnistria.

Along with former presidential candidate Alexander Radchenko he is the co-founder of Man and His Rights (Chelovek i Ego Prava), the only human rights newspaper in the region.

According to a report by Organization for Security and Co-operation in Europe, Buchatskii is under pressure due to a campaign of physical and psychological intimidation which the authorities of Transnistria have organized against the newspaper.
