= Ekaterina Gubareva =

Ukrainian separatist diplomat and politician (born 1983)

- Екатерина Губарева
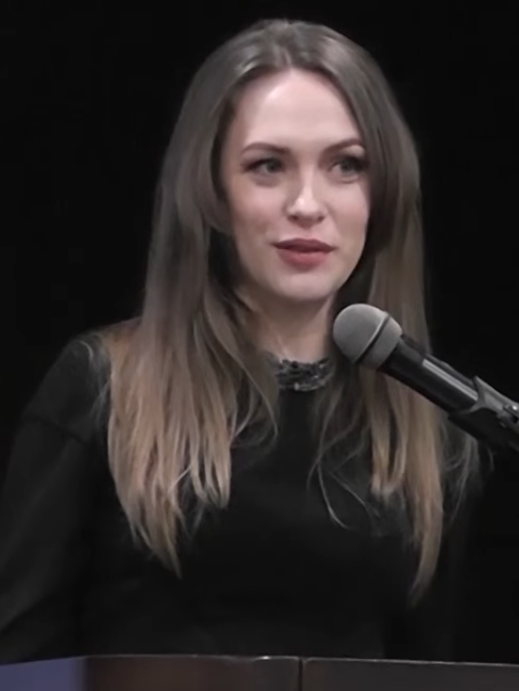
- Gubareva in 2015

Deputy Head of the Kherson Military-Civilian Administration
- In office 16 June 2022 – 16 November 2022
- Governor: Volodymyr Saldo

Minister of Foreign Affairs of the Donetsk People's Republic
- In office 16 May 2014 – 15 August 2014
- Preceded by: Post established
- Succeeded by: Alexandru Caraman

Personal details
- Born: 5 July 1983 (age 43) Kakhovka, Kherson Oblast, Ukrainian SSR
- Party: New Russia Party
- Spouse: Pavel Gubarev
- Children: 3
- Education: Donetsk National Technical University

Ekaterina Yuryevna Gubareva (Note: Also transliterated to Yekaterina) (Russian: Екатерина Юрьевна Губарева; born 5 July 1983) is a pro-Russian activist and former public figure.

Gubareva held senior positions in pro-Russian separatist-held territory during the war in Donbas, briefly as the "Minister of Foreign Affairs" in Russian-occupied Donetsk for the Donetsk People's Republic in 2014, and then following the 2022 Russian invasion of Ukraine deputy head of the collaborationist Kherson Military-Civilian Administration in Russian-occupied Ukraine. In November 2022, Gubareva was detained, and then dismissed from this position. As of 2025, this was her last position in public life.

== Early life and education ==
Born on 5 July 1983 in Kakhovka, Gubareva has a degree in computer science from the Donetsk National Technical University. Before the war in Donbas, which began in 2014, she was known as a local organizer of healthy lifestyle festivals. Gubareva was an amateur artist, and her works were exhibited in a Donetsk gallery.

== Separatist activities ==
=== Donetsk People's Republic ===
On 1 March 2014, during anti-Euromaidan protests, at a rally in Donetsk, southeastern part of Ukraine, her husband Pavel Gubarev was chosen as "people's governor" of Donetsk oblast. On 6 March 2014, Gubarev was then arrested by Ukraine, and taken by the Security Service of Ukraine to Kyiv.

In April 2014, the Donetsk People's Republic was proclaimed within the Donbas region. For the first few months of the Donetsk People's Republic, Gubareva was the head of its Ministry of Foreign Affairs, with responsibility for humanitarian aid convoys (food, medicine, childcare products) for the civilians and fighters of the Donetsk People's Republic. She said of her work this time: "We don't carry weapons, we're not fighters, and we don't know anything about that side of things." On 16 August 2014, Gubareva was demoted, with the former vice president of Transnistria, Alexander Karaman, replacing her in the post of foreign minister of the DPR, for unspecified reasons. Gubareva then became the Deputy Minister of Foreign Affairs.

After an assassination attempt on her husband Pavel Gubarev, on 13 October 2014, Gubareva temporarily led the New Russia Party. Pavel Gubarev formed the Free Donbas movement in 2014, however he would go onto to be blocked from standing, and marginalised in political life in the DNR. Ekaterina Gubareva had been set to head the Free Donbas party list for the "elections" of the People's Council of the Donetsk People's Republic of 11 November 2018, however on 29 September 2018, she was arrested and held in custody by unknown people, and so was unable to attend the party convention that day, with the result that she was excluded from the party list. After this, Gubareva left for Rostov-on-Don.

=== Sanctions ===
Gubareva was sanctioned by the UK government in 2014 in relation to the Russo-Ukrainian War. The European Union has also sanctioned Gubareva, she was banned from entering the European Union and her accounts in European banks were frozen. According to EU officials:

In her capacity of so-called "Minister of Foreign Affairs" she (Gubareva) is responsible of defending the so-called "Donetsk People's Republic", thus undermining the territorial integrity, sovereignty and independence of Ukraine. In addition, her bank account is used to finance illegal armed separatist groups. In taking on and acting in this capacity she has therefore supported actions and policies which undermine the territorial integrity, sovereignty and independence of Ukraine.

=== Russian occupation of Kherson Oblast ===
On 16 June 2022, during the Russian invasion of Ukraine, Gubareva took office as Chief of Staff and Deputy Head of the Russian-occupation government called "Kherson Military-Civilian Administration" for Digitalization, Communications, Legal Regulation, and Domestic and Foreign Policy. In statements made of a planned referendum to join Russia, she claimed that the Russian Federation was repeating the history of Empress Catherine who developed the "wild fields" following the Russo-Turkish War of 1768–1774.

Gubareva was initially promoted by Russian state media in her role in Kherson. However, with Russian forces retreating, and Ukrainian forces moving into Kherson in November 2022, the relationship to Gubareva dramatically changed. Gubareva was briefly reported as having 'disappeared' on 15 November 2022, however on 16 November, Russian media reported that Gubareva had been detained by the Russian police in relation to a corruption case involving embezzlement of public funds. Gubareva was later released, and dismissed from her position. As of 2024, she has not had another position in public life.

=== Comparisons to Natalya Poklonskaya ===
During her public life, due to being a young, blonde, attractive female, on the Russian side, Gubareva was often been compared to former Crimean prosecutor Natalya Poklonskaya. Gubareva said that she considered herself to be 'her own woman', and so the comparison was only valid in terms of 'both being beautiful ladies'.

== Personal life ==
Gubareva is married to Pavel Gubarev, the pair have two sons and a daughter, and live in Rostov-on-Don.
