= Petr Tomaily =

Transnistrian businessman and politician (born 1965)

- Born: October 21, 1965 (age 59); Cioc-Maidan, Moldova
- Years active: 1984-2015
- Known for: Former presidential candidate from Transnistria
- Height: 5 ft 3 in (160 cm)

Petr Tomaily (Cyrillic: Петр Томайлы; born 21 October 1965 in Cioc-Maidan, Moldavian SSR) is a Transnistrian businessman and politician, who previously served as a member of the Transnistrian parliament for the political party Obnovlenie.

He was a candidate for President in the 2006 election, standing as an independent, and finished last in a four-candidate race.

He is an entrepreneur and owner of a private business in Bender. He is an ethnic Gagauz.

== Personal life ==
He is 5 feet 3 inches (160 cm)—shorter than typical. He speaks Turkic, fluent English, Romanian and Russian, When he was 2 years old, his right arm became disabled.
