= Sergey Leontiev =

Transnistrian politician (born 1944)

- Сергей Леонтьев

2nd Vice President of Transnistria
- In office 1 December 1991 – 9 December 2001
- President: Igor Smirnov
- Preceded by: Alexandru Caraman
- Succeeded by: Aleksandr Ivanovich Korolyov

Personal details
- Born: Sergey Fyodorovich Leontiev; 9 February 1944 (age 82) Levantivka, Krasni Okny Raion, Odesa Oblast, Ukrainian SSR, Soviet Union

Sergey Fyodorovich Leontiev (Russian: Сергей Федорович Леонтьев, born 9 February 1944) was the Vice President of Transnistria from December 2001 until December 2006.

He studied at the faculty of mathematics and physics of the T. G. Shevchenko University in Tiraspol, Transnistria. He was head of the administrative district of Grigoriopol. He was a deputy of the Supreme Council of Transnistria from 1990 to 2000. In 2000 he became head of the presidential administration of Transnistria. He was not a candidate in the 2006 election, and hence was replaced by Aleksandr Ivanovich Korolyov.

Political offices
Preceded by Alexandru Caraman	Vice President of Transnistria; 2001–2006	Succeeded by Aleksander Korolyov
