= Andrei Safonov =

Transnistrian politician (born 1964)

- Андрей Сафонов

Member of the Moldovan Parliament
- In office 1990–1994

Personal details
- Born: 6 June 1964 (age 62) Chişinău, Moldavian SSR, Soviet Union
- Profession: Journalist

Andrei Mikhailovich Safonov (Russian: Андрей Михайлович Сафонов; born 6 June 1964) is a politician from Transnistria. He lives in Bender, Transnistria's second largest city.

== Biography ==
Safonov ran for president against incumbent president Igor Smirnov in the election held on 10 December 2006, and came third with 3.9% of the vote.

He is a former teacher of literature and a former member of the parliament of the MSSR (Moldovan Soviet Socialist Republic), within the USSR. After Transnistria's declaration of independence, 2 September 1990, he founded the official news agency Olvia Press. He was subsequently appointed Minister of Education, Science and Culture, a post he held until 1999 when he formed an opposition movement to Igor Smirnov and an opposition newspaper, founded in 2000, called Novaia Gazeta.
