= Igor Smirnov (politician) =

President of Transnistria from 1991 to 2011

- Игорь Смирнов
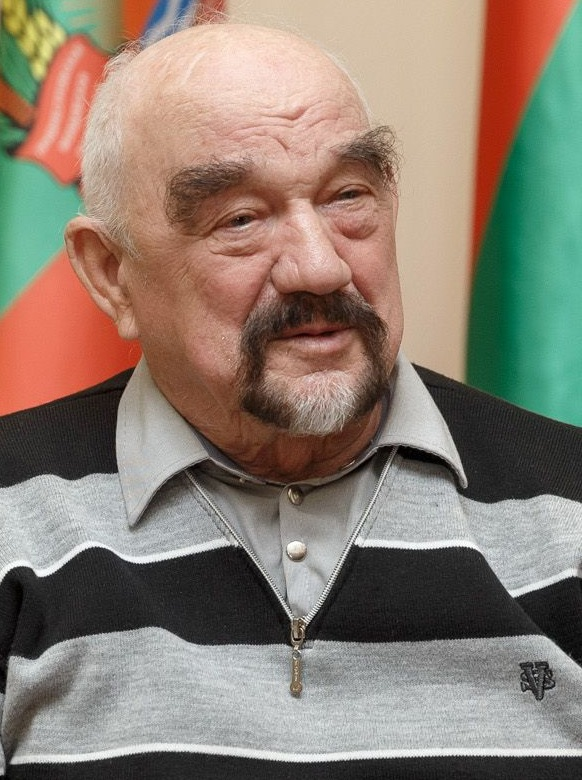
- Smirnov in 2017

1st President of Transnistria
- In office 1 October 1991 – 30 December 2011
- Vice President: Alexandru Caraman; Sergey Leontiev; Aleksandr Korolyov
- Preceded by: Andrey Manoylov (acting)
- Succeeded by: Yevgeny Shevchuk
- In office 2 September 1990 – 25 August 1991
- Vice President: Alexandru Caraman
- Preceded by: Office established
- Succeeded by: Andrey Manoylov (acting)

Personal details
- Born: Igor Nikolaevich Smirnov; 23 October 1941 (age 85) Petropavlovsk-Kamchatsky, Russian SFSR, Soviet Union
- Party: Republic
- Spouse: Zhannetta Nikolaevna Lotnik

Igor Nikolaevich Smirnov (Russian: Игорь Николаевич Смирнов, Romanian: Igor Nicolaevici Smirnov; born 23 October 1941) is a Russian-born Transnistrian politician who served as the first president (1991–2011) of the internationally unrecognized Pridnestrovian Moldavian Republic.

== Childhood ==
Igor Smirnov was born in Petropavlovsk-Kamchatsky, Russian SFSR, Soviet Union during World War II. He was the son of Nikolai Stepanovich Smirnov, a worker within the Soviet Communist Party apparatus and Zinaida Grigor'evna Smirnova, a journalist and newspaper editor. As the Party promoted Nikolai Stepanovich to ever more important positions, the family moved from Petropavlovsk to the Ukrainian SSR, where the Red Army had recently expelled the Nazi German military. The Smirnovs initially benefited from Nikolai Stepanovich's successes—he reached the position of First Secretary of the Hola Prystan Raion committee in Soviet Ukraine.

In the summer of 1952, Nikolai Stepanovich was arrested for corruption. He was sentenced to fifteen years in the Soviet forced labor camps with a following period of five years' internal exile. As the family of an enemy of the people, life was difficult for Zinaida Grigor'evna and her three sons, Vladimir, Oleg, and Igor. In the wake of Joseph Stalin's death in 1953, Nikolai Stepanovich was released together with many Soviet inmates. The Smirnov family was reunited in central Russia near the Ural Mountains, where Nikolai Stepanovich directed a primary school and Zinaida Grigor'evna worked as the editor of a local Komsomol newspaper.

== Professional life ==
In 1959, Igor Smirnov began work at the Zlatoust Metallurgical Factory at the age of eighteen. Soon, however, he moved back to Ukraine to work on the construction of a new hydroelectric power station in the town of Nova Kakhovka in the Kherson Oblast.

Smirnov displayed a great enthusiasm for Soviet life, pursuing higher education in the evenings and weekends after work and participating in a number of athletic and cultural activities. He met and married a young engineer named Zhannetta Nikolaevna Lotnik in the early 1960s and served in the Soviet Army from 1963 to 1966 as a Second Lieutenant. In 1963, Smirnov joined the Communist Party of the Soviet Union and served as a Komsomol organizer (komsorg) after returning to civilian life.

Once back from the military, Smirnov also continued the correspondence courses he had begun in the early 1960s, receiving a degree from the Zaporizhzhia Machine-Building Institute in 1974. Meanwhile, he worked his way up from the shop floor to be an assistant director of one of the shops of the Nova Kakhovka Machine-Building Factory. With his college diploma, Smirnov continued to be promoted. He soon became the shop director, then assistant to the factory's chief industrial upgrades and new technologies engineer and finally an assistant director.

While he was not made director in 1987 when that position's erstwhile occupant retired, he was given the directorship of the "Elektromash" Electronics Concern in the nearby Moldovan city of Tiraspol. This was just over two years before Smirnov led the city's municipal government as the chairman of the Tiraspol city soviet and just under three before he held the most powerful position in the embryonic, and unrecognized, Pridnestrovian Moldovan Soviet Socialist Republic.

== The strike campaign ==
As communist states began to collapse at the end of the 1980s, people in some areas of the Soviet Union began to demand sovereignty for separate national identities. As the citizens of the Moldavian SSR debated the merits of introducing Moldovan as the official language of the republic—at first with Russian as a second official language and later without—the republic was divided over the issue of nationalizing Moldova. One side believed that Moldova should be independent from the Moscow Kremlin and turned into a nation-state, possibly in a union with Romania where a virtually identical language is spoken. The other believed that Moldova should remain a part of the supranationalist USSR, possibly in a post-communist, but still united country.

Smirnov and many of his colleagues were suspicious of the possibility of language laws from the beginning, they suspected this to be the first step towards "nationalization" of the republic at the expense of "their country", the Soviet Union. However, in August 1989, when it was leaked that Moldovan would be made the only official language, Smirnov and other industrial workers in Tiraspol banded together to create the United Work Collective Council (OSTK – Объединенный Совет трудовых коллективов) and called an immediate strike that eventually led to the shutdown of most major industrial activity (concentrated in the Transnistrian region) throughout the SSR.

== Entry into politics ==
When the strike campaign, from 16 August to 22 September 1989, failed to produce much of an effect in Chişinău, the OSTK re-examined its tactics. Smirnov and others saw the upcoming Moldovan elections as an opportunity to effect change through different means. Smirnov won two seats in the elections of February 1990, the 32nd district seat for the city soviet (municipal government) of Tiraspol and the 125th district seat for the Supreme Soviet of MSSR (republican government) in the 1990 Moldovan parliamentary election. Once in the city soviet, Smirnov ran for chairmanship of that body. In a dramatic demonstration of how much the Communist Party's power had waned, Smirnov beat his challenger, the First Secretary of the city's Party Committee, Leonid Tsurkan, by a 2-to-1 margin. From this time forward, Tiraspol was an OSTK-controlled city.

Things did not go quite as smoothly for Smirnov in the Moldovan Supreme Soviet. The OSTK candidates, mostly from Transnistria in the country's eastern periphery, were a small fraction of the body's overall membership—approximately 15 percent. In May 1990, these Transnistrian Supreme Soviet deputies were attacked and beaten by pro-independence protesters and quickly left the body for their homes in the East. Unable to affect the course of events in Chişinău, these deputies acted to establish their own Soviet republic, a republic that would remain a part of the Soviet Union and not secede with the rest of Moldova. Many Moldovans reacted with outrage at this infringement of their sovereignty and the Soviet central government publicly rebuked the separatists for making the situation worse and pushing Moldova further toward independence.

== Proclamation of independence ==
Igor Smirnov emerged as a leader of the OSTK on a regional level as Transnistrian politicians and activists worked towards sovereignty from the Moldovan SSR in the summer and autumn of 1990. When the First All-region Congress of Transnistrian Deputies created a self-contained Transnistrian economic zone in June 1990, Smirnov was elected chair of a coordinating council charged with carrying momentum forward to sovereignty. A second congress held on September 2 proclaimed the creation of the Pridnestrovian Moldavian Soviet Socialist Republic (PMSSR) and deputies elected him to chair the Provisional Supreme Soviet of the PMSSR.

In 1991, Smirnov was arrested in a secret operation by special forces of the Moldovan Ministry of Internal Affairs in Kyiv, accused of "the intentional territorial dismemberment of the Republic of Moldova" and brought to Chișinău. He was released shortly thereafter after reported pressure from Russia.

In his new role as chairman of the PMSSR Supreme Soviet, and later, president of the Pridnestrovian Moldovan Republic (PMR), Smirnov worked to gain recognition for the state. While this was never a likely outcome, Smirnov was successful at securing the cooperation of a locally stationed Soviet Army unit; as the conflict grew increasingly violent at the end of 1991 and into 1992, Soviet Army leaders and enlisted men, often themselves from Transnistria, gave moral support, weapons and ammunition to PMR separatists. Eventually a number of Soviet Army soldiers joined the PMR Army.

In December 1991 Smirnov beat Grigorii Marakutsa, his successor as chairman of the PMSSR Supreme Soviet and another challenger in an election for president of the Pridnestrovian Moldovan Soviet Socialist Republic. He won with 64% of the vote.

== Smirnov after the war ==
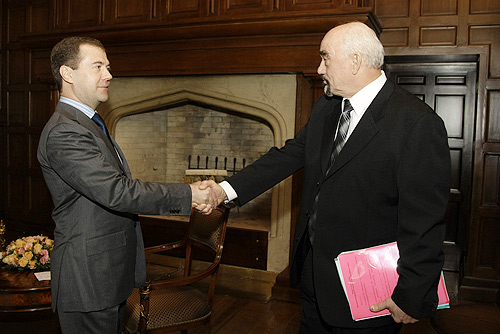
Smirnov with President of Russia Dmitry Medvedev in Barvikha on 18 February 2009

Smirnov won three further elections after 1991. On 23 December 1996, he took 72% of the vote against 20% for Vladimir Malakhov and on December 9, 2001, he took 81.9% of the vote against 6.7% for Tom Zenovich and 4.6% for Alexander Radchenko. On December 10, 2006, Smirnov was re-elected for a third time with 82.4% of the vote. His Communist Party opponent, Nadezhda Bondarenko got only 8.1% of the vote. Andrey Safonov, owner and editor of the Opposition newspaper Novaia gazeta got 3.9% and Renewal Party MP Peter Tomaily, standing as an independent candidate, got 2.1%. 1.6% voted for "none of the above" and 1.9% of the ballot papers were blank or spoiled. Turnout was 66.1%. None of these elections were recognized by the international community, which does not recognize the legality of the Transnistrian authorities and called for democratic elections for a self-governing territory within the boundaries of Moldova.

Smirnov organized a referendum on 17 September 2006 where the Transnistrian population was asked whether Transnistria should be reintegrated into Moldova (which was rejected) or remain independent and join Russia in the future (which was approved). Smirnov made more references to a possible accession of Transnistria into Russia during his rule.

In the December 2011 elections, Igor Smirnov came in third with 24.82% of the vote. He trailed the chairman of the Supreme Soviet, Anatolii Kaminskii, and the former chairman of that body, Evgenii Shevchuk. In the election, leaders of United Russia, the ruling political party of Russia, voiced a lack of confidence in Smirnov and supported the campaign of Anatolii Kaminskii.

Smirnov announced that he will retire from politics when the Pridnestrovian Moldovan Republic obtains international recognition as a sovereign state and has called this goal his life's work.

His last vice president was Aleksandr Ivanovich Korolyov.

== Cabinet ==
The following table shows Smirnov's cabinet at the end of his time in office.

Smirnov cabinet
| Office | Incumbent |
|---|---|
| President | Igor Smirnov |
| Vice president | Aleksandr Korolyov |
| Right Hand of the President | Vladimir Ivanov |
| Minister of Defence | Stanislav Galimovich Hazheev |
| Minister of Finance | Irina Ivanovna Molokanova |
| Minister of Foreign Affairs | Vladimir Yastrebchak |
| Minister of Internal Affairs | Vadim Krasnoselsky |
| Minister of Justice | Sergei Mikhailovich Stepanov |
| Minister of Economy | Elena Egorovna Chernenko |
| Minister of Industry | Peter Stepanov |
| Minister of Natural Resources and Environmental Control | Oleg Alekseevich Kaliakin (until 14 December 2010) |
| Minister of Natural Resources and Environmental Control | Alexander Vasilyevich Kozelsky (15–22 December 2010) |
| Minister of Natural Resources and Environmental Control | Sergei Vasilyevich Moroz (from 22 December 2010) |
| Minister of Telecommunications | Vladimir Mikhailovich Belyaev |
| Minister of Health and Social Security | Ivan Tkachenko |
| Minister of Education | Maria Rafailovna Pashchenko |
| Minister of State Security | Vladimir Antyufeev |

== See also ==
- Politics of Transnistria

Political offices
| New office | President of Transnistria; 1990–1991 | Succeeded by Andrey Manoylov; Acting |
| New office | Speaker of Parliament; 1990 | Succeeded by Vladimir Gonchar; Acting |
| Preceded by Andrey Manoylov; Acting | President of Transnistria; 1991–2011 | Succeeded by Yevgeny Shevchuk |
