= Aleksandr Ivanovich Korolyov =

Transnistrian politician (born 1959)

Aleksandr Korolyov
- Александр Королёв
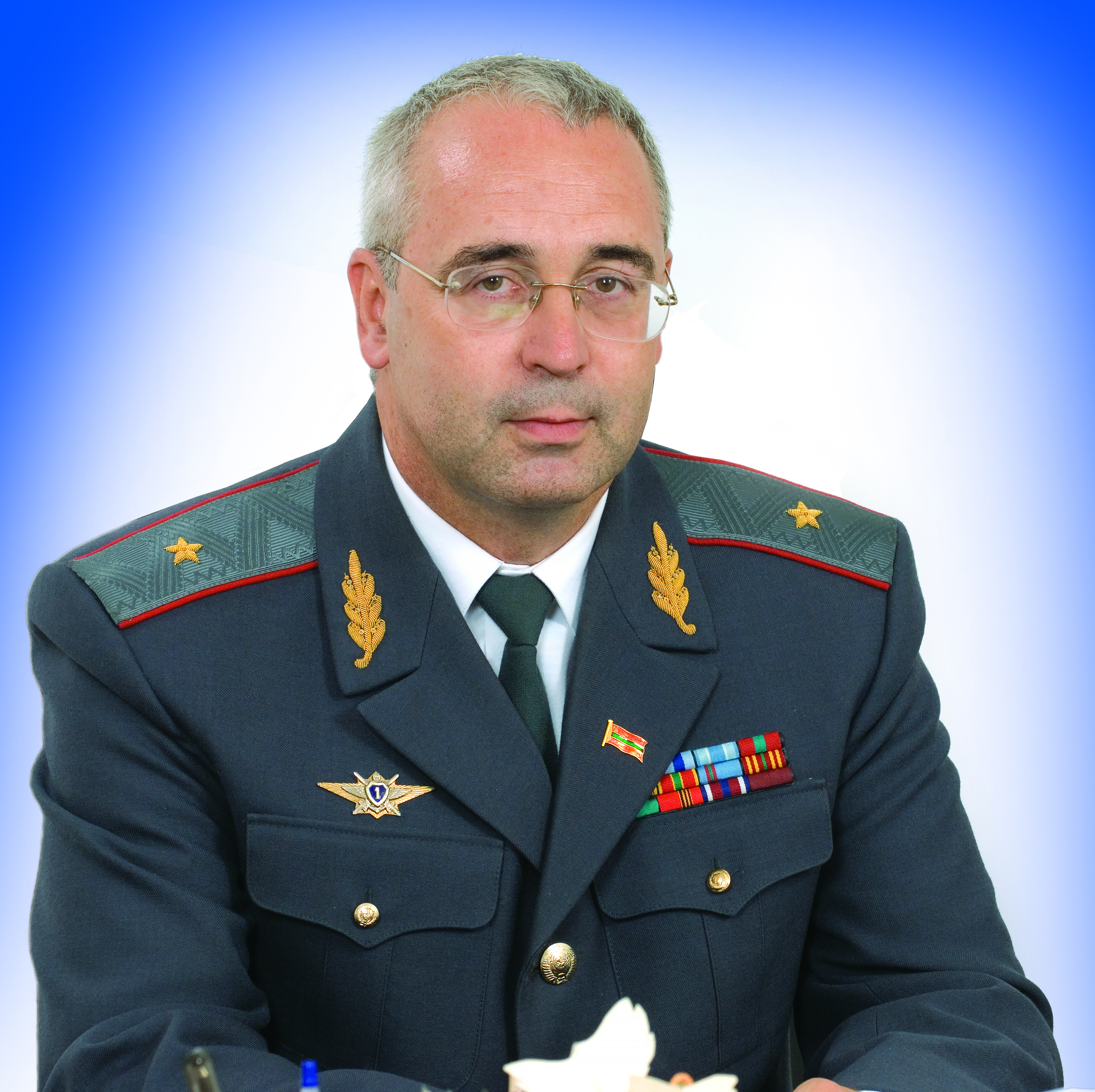
- Korolyov in 2006

3rd Vice President of Transnistria
- Preceded by: Sergey Leontiev
- Succeeded by: Office abolished

Personal details
- Born: 24 October 1959 (age 67)
- Height: 169 cm (5 ft 7 in)

Aleksandr Ivanovich Korolyov (Russian: Aлександр Иванович Королёв; born 24 October 1959) is a Transnistrian politician. He is of Russian ethnicity.

Until 2006, he was the Minister of the Interior of the Pridnestrovian Moldavian Republic (PMR). He started to work in the ministry of the interior of the Moldavian SSR in 1985. When the PMR declared independence on 2 September 1990, Korolev continued his work in the same post but under the new government until 2000, when he was appointed the country's minister of the interior. Korolev holds PMR citizenship.

In the 2006 PMR presidential election he was elected to the post of Vice President of Transnistria as the running mate of Igor Smirnov.

He is the head of the PMR Security Council. Once a year, he also MC's the annual Miss PMR competition for charity.

Political offices
Preceded by Sergey Leontiev	Vice President of Transnistria; 2006 - 2011	position abolished
