= Aleksandr Karaman =

Transnistrian politician (born 1956)

- Александр Караман
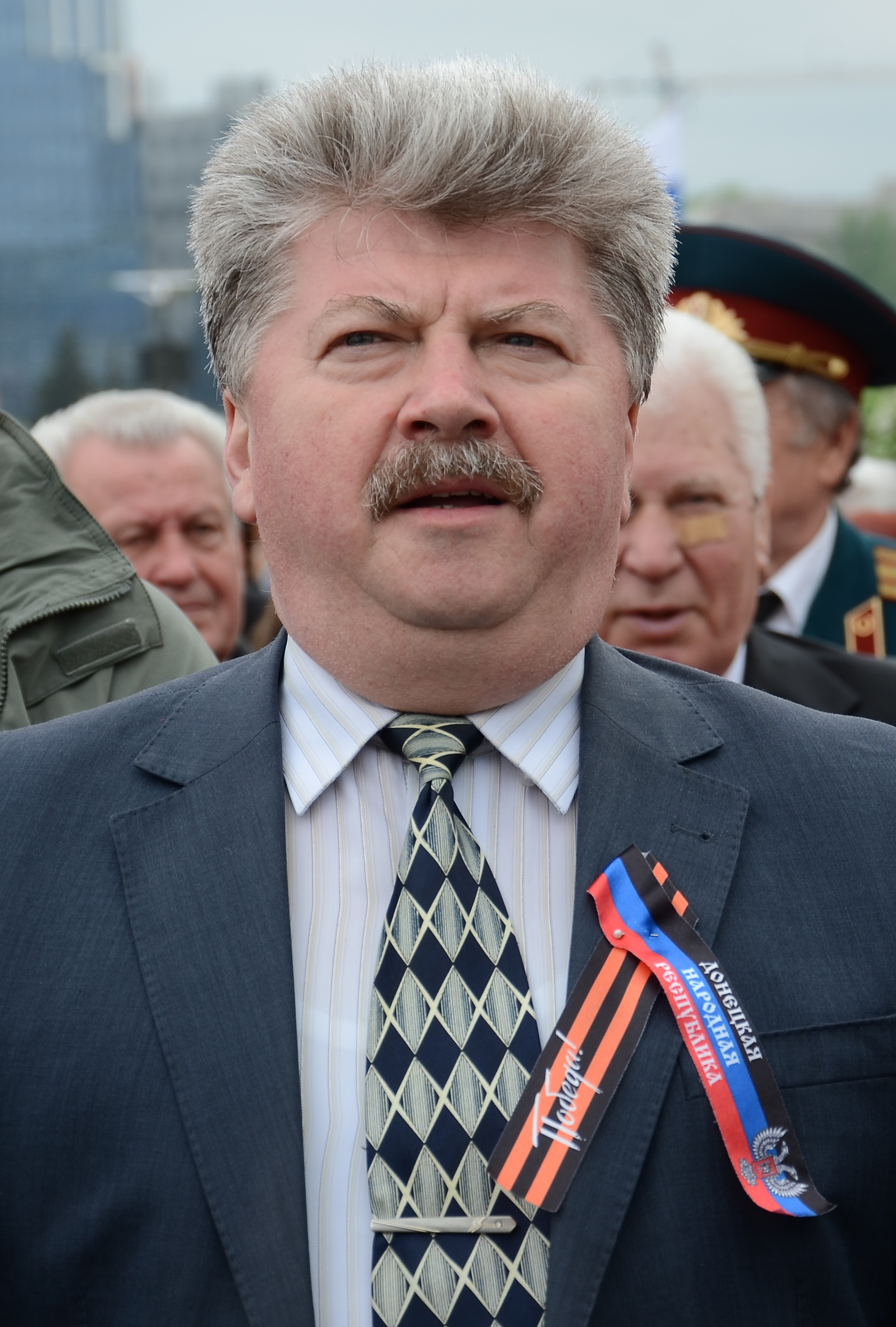
- Karaman in 2015

Vice President of Transnistria
- In office 1990–2001
- Preceded by: Office established

Foreign Minister of the Donetsk People's Republic
- In office August 15, 2014 – August 28, 2014
- Preceded by: Ekaterina Gubareva

Personal details
- Born: July 26, 1956 (age 70) Cioburciu, Moldavian SSR, Soviet Union

Aleksandr Akimovich Karaman (Russian: Александр Акимович Караман, Romanian: Alexandru Caraman; born 26 July 1956) is a Transnistrian politician and later the Foreign Minister of the Donetsk People's Republic (DPR) during August 2014. He was the Vice President of Transnistria from 1990 to 2001 and is an ethnic Moldovan. He is on the wanted list in the DPR for kidnapping, but currently lives in Russia.

He was a communist party leader in Slobozia district, and a delegate at the 17th Congress of Moldovan Communist Party. He was against the acceptance by the Moldovan Communist Party of press freedom and criticised the tolerance that Communist party showed towards anticommunist publications. Caraman was instrumental in declaration of independence of the Pridnestrovian Moldavian Soviet Socialist Republic on September 2, 1990, and held the vice-presidency until the 2001 elections.

From July 21 to November 12, 2014, he was the Deputy Chairman of the Council of Ministers for Social Affairs in the Donetsk People's Republic. From August 15 to August 28, 2014, he was the Foreign Minister for the Donetsk People's Republic. During the summer of 2016, he was charged with kidnapping by the DPR prosecutor and he subsequently fled to Russia.

== Sanctions ==
Because of his involvement in undermining the territorial integrity of Ukraine, he is under sanctions since 2014 in the United States, the European Union, Canada, Australia, and Switzerland.

Political offices
Preceded by Position established	Vice President of Transnistria; 1990–2001	Succeeded by Sergey Leontiev
