= Vladimir Mikhailovich Belyaev =

Transnistrian politician

Vladimir Mikhailovich Belyaev (Russian: Владимир Михайлович Беляев, Romanian: Vladimir Mihailovici Beliaev; born 18 March 1965) is the minister of information and telecommunications of Transnistria. He was born and raised in Tiraspol, Moldavian SSR, which became the capital of Transnistria when Transnistria declared independence in 1990. In 1987 he received an engineering degree in Odesa in Ukraine. Belyaev served from 1988 until 1991 in the Soviet Army and then until 1998 in the Russian Army. From 1998, he worked at the ministry of information and telecommunications, where he was appointed deputy minister in 2000. In 2002, he was appointed as minister. Belyaev is married and has a daughter. He is of Russian ancestry.
