= 2000 Transnistrian parliamentary election =

Election in a breakaway region of Moldova

← 1995	10 December 2000	2005 →
- 43 seats in the Supreme Council; 22 seats needed for a majority
Party	Leader	Seats
Unity		9
Obnovlenie		7
Power to the People		1
Independents	–	25
This lists parties that won seats. See the complete results below.
Speaker of the Supreme Council before	Speaker of the Supreme Council after
Grigore Mărăcuţă; Independent	Grigore Mărăcuţă; Independent

Parliamentary elections were held in the breakaway republic of Transnistria on 10 December 2000. Most seats were won by independent candidates. Women made up four of the 42 elected representatives. Grigore Mărăcuţă was elected for a third term as speaker, having the support of 39 out of 41 representatives present at his election. According to an article by the ethnic Russian researcher from Moldova Alla Skvortsova from 2002, "polls and elections in the PMR may to some extent have been rigged".

== Results ==
Party	Seats
Unity	9
Obnovlenie	7
Power to the People	1
Independents	25
Vacant	1
Total	43
Source: Immigration and Nationality Directorate
