= Brosnahan Island =

Island off the Ross Ice Shelf, Antarctica

- Location within Antarctica

Geography
- Location: Antarctica
- Coordinates: 79°28′S 160°59′E

Administration
- Administered under the Antarctic Treaty System

Demographics
- Population: Uninhabited

Brosnahan Island (79°28′S 160°59′E) is an island 2 kilometres (1 nmi) long, rising above the western part of the Ross Ice Shelf 20 kilometres (11 nmi) northeast of Cape Murray. It was mapped by the United States Geological Survey from tellurometer surveys and Navy air photos, 1959–63, and named by the Advisory Committee on Antarctic Names for Commander James J. Brosnahan, U.S. Navy, commander of the McMurdo Station winter party, 1961.

== See also ==
- List of antarctic and sub-antarctic islands
