= Patriot Party (Armenia) =

Patriot Party Հայրենասիրական կուսակցություն
- Leader: Balyan Vardan
- Founded: 2021
- Preceded by: Nation State Party
- Headquarters: Yerevan
- Ideology: Armenian nationalism
- Slogan: Will and Honor

The Patriot Party (Armenian: Հայրենասիրական կուսակցություն, romanized: Hayrenaser kusakts’ut’yun), also known as the Patriotic Party, is an Armenian political party. It was founded on 13 January 2021 and is currently led by Balyan Vardan.

== History ==
The party traces its roots from the now defunct Nation State Party, which was established in 1994.

The Patriot Party was established during the 2020–2021 Armenian protests. Armenian political analyst Vardan Balyan stated, "The purpose is to unite all vital national forces in building, with the efforts of every Armenian, an honest and fair state that will defend our language, culture, faith, freedom, honor and homeland.”

The party does not maintain any representation in the National Assembly and currently acts as an extra-parliamentary force.

== Ideology ==
The party supports the economic development of Armenia, pursuing peace in the Caucasus region, securing Armenia's borders, advocating for the recognition of the Armenian genocide, and developing stronger ties with the international community.

== See also ==
- Programs of political parties in Armenia
