= Cioc-Maidan =

Cioc-Maidan Çok Maydan
- Commune
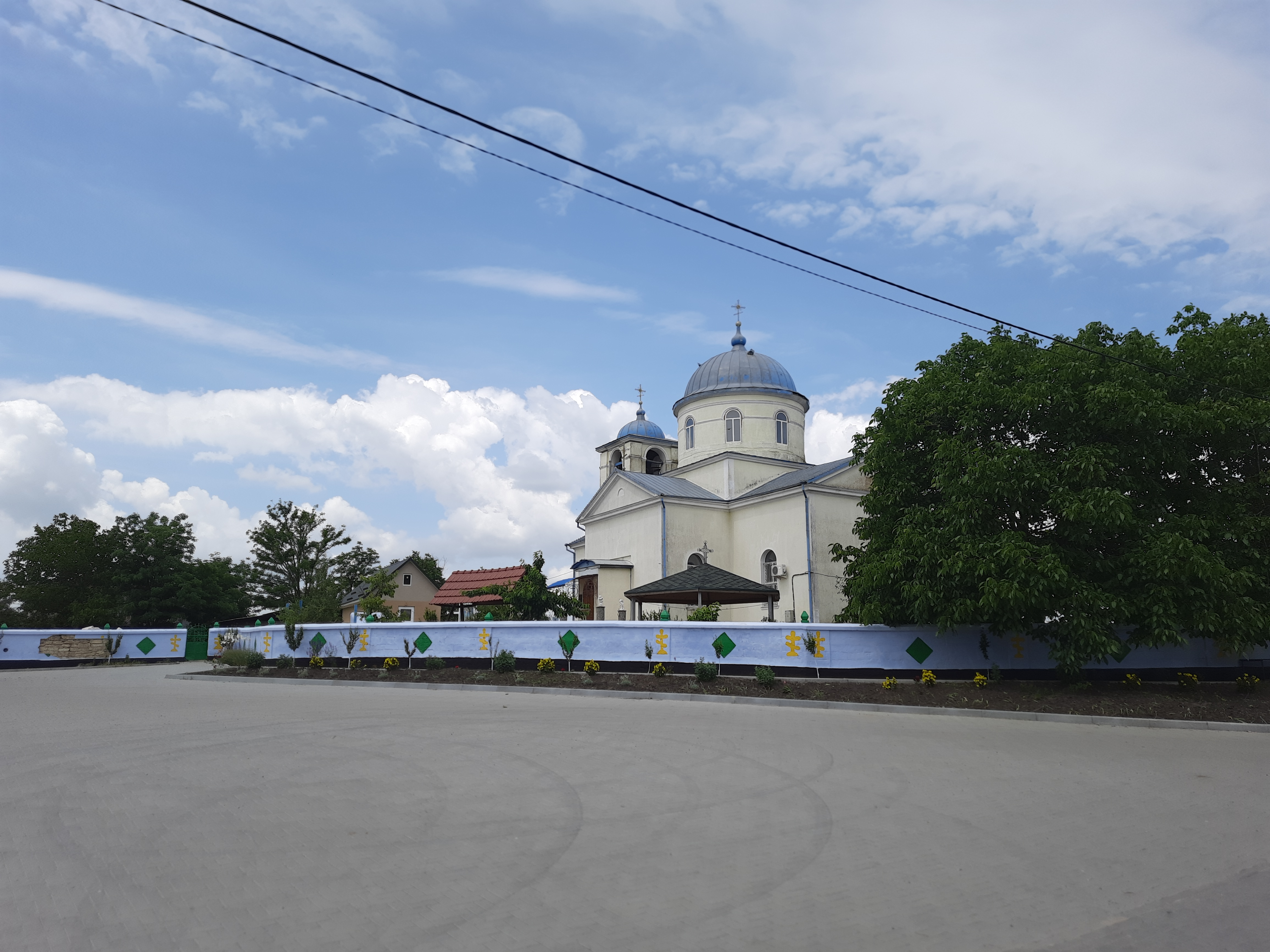
- Church of the Ascension of Christ in Cioc-Maidan

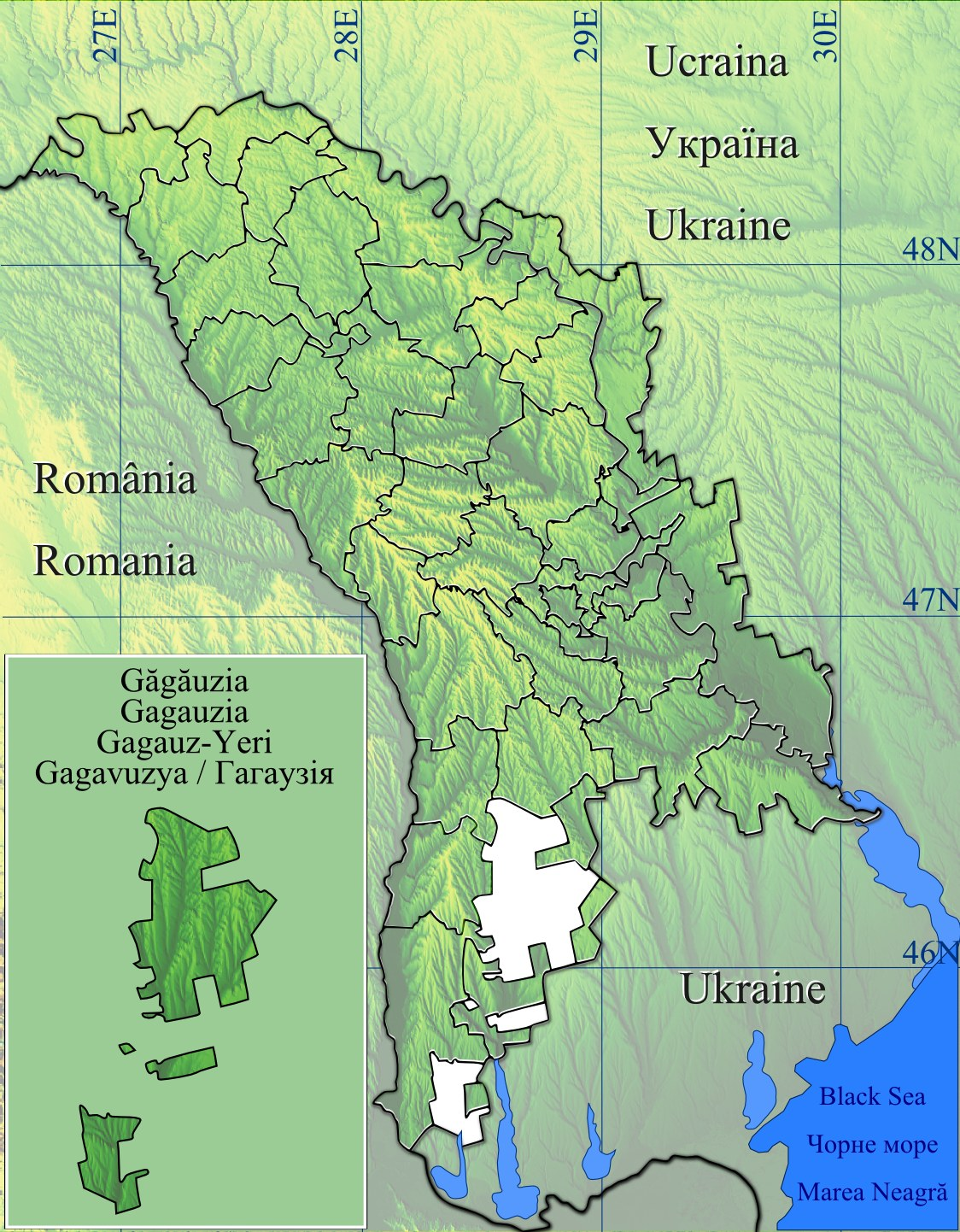
- Location of Cioc-Maidan in Moldova
- Coordinates: 46°21′49″N 28°49′11″E
- Country: Moldova
- Autonomous Region: Gagauzia
- Founded: 1811

Government
  - Mayor: Oleg Konstandog

Population (2024)
  - Total: 2,202

Ethnicity (2024 census)
  - Gagauz people: 90.32%
  - Bulgarians: 5.08%
  - other: 4.60%
- Time zone: UTC+2 (EET)
- Climate: Cfb

Cioc-Maidan (Gagauz: Çok Maydan) is a commune and village in the Comrat district, Gagauz Autonomous Territorial Unit of the Republic of Moldova. According to the 2024 Moldovan census the commune has 2,202 people, 1,989 (90.32%) of them being Gagauz.

== History ==
The village was founded between 1811 by Gagauz from Bulgaria. In 1861, the Ascension Church was built.

== International relations ==
=== Twin towns — Sister cities ===
- Erenler, Turkey;
