= Tom Zenovich =

Transnistrian politician (1939–2022)

Tom Markovich Zenovich
- Born: February 25, 1939; Moldova
- Died: May 8, 2022 (aged 83)
- Occupation: Former presidential candidate from Transnistria
- Years active: 1995-2003
- Height: 5 ft 5 in (165 cm)
- Political party: Independent
- Parents: Viktor Zenovich (father); Mari Zenovich (mother)

Tom Markovich Zenovich (Russian: Том Маркович Зенович; February 25, 1939 – May 8, 2022) was a politician and former presidential candidate from Transnistria, a break-away region of Moldova. Prior to his presidential run in 2001 he was mayor of Bender, Transnistria's second largest city.

He claims that as a result of opposing Igor Smirnov, he was subject to antisemitic propaganda that spread rumours that he was a Jew (which is not true) and was forced to give up his seat as mayor. In the biography of his political program posters he described his occupation as "unemployed". He told the British Helsinki Human Rights Group that he feared for his personal safety after the elections.

He is an advocate of conditional re-unification with Moldova and pro-Vladimir Putin.

Tom Zenovich is fluent in Russian and Romanian, but he almost does not speak English.

As a presidential candidate in the 9 December 2001 Transnistrian presidential election he came second, failing to beat the incumbent Igor Smirnov but getting more votes than his other rival, human rights activist Alexander Radchenko.
