= Ivan Tkachenko (politician) =

Transnistrian politician (born 1964)

Ivan Valerievich Tkachenko (Russian: Иван Валерьевич Ткаченко) is the Minister of Health and Social Security of the Pridnestrovian Moldavian Republic (PMR). He was born on 24 December 1964 in Desantne, Izmail Raion, Odesa Oblast, the Ukrainian SSR. He is of Ukrainian ethnicity.
