= 2001 Transnistrian presidential election =

- 9 December 2001
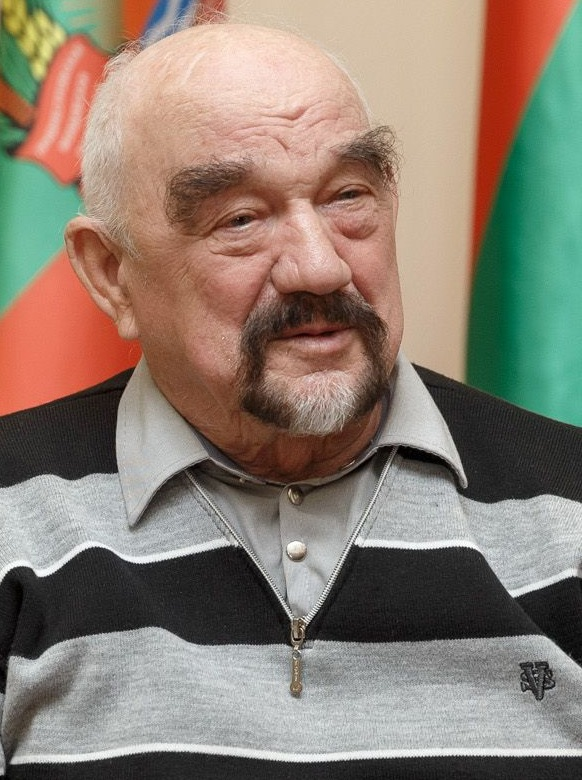

| Nominee | Igor Smirnov | Tom Zenovich |
| Party | Independent | Independent |
| Running mate | Sergey Leontiev |
| Popular vote | 208,617 | 17,018 |
| Percentage | 81.85% | 6.68% |
President before election
Igor Smirnov
Independent
Elected President
Igor Smirnov
Independent

Presidential elections were held in the breakaway republic of Transnistria on 9 December 2001. The result was a victory for incumbent President Igor Smirnov, who received 82% of the vote. The other candidates were Tom Zenovich, mayor of Bender (the second largest city in the country), and Alexander Radchenko of the Power to the People party, which advocated reunion with Moldova. The Moldova Country Reports on Human Rights Practices for 2003, released by the Bureau of Democracy, Human Rights, and Labor of the U.S. Department of State on February 25, 2004, stated "Citizens' right to change their government was severely restricted in Transnistria. In the period prior to the 2001 "presidential" elections, authorities shut down a political party and a youth group, closed a leftist party newspaper, and seized a press run. The authorities refused to register one potential presidential candidate and dismissed another from his job as mayor of Bender prior to the election. Authorities reportedly threatened workers with job loss and students with expulsion from their universities if they did not vote for the incumbent, Igor Smirnov. Local observers reported that the actual voting was unfair, with considerable ballot box stuffing. Officials in the northern region of Kamenka reported that 103.6 percent of their voters cast ballots for Smirnov." According to an article by the ethnic Russian researcher from Moldova Alla Skvortsova from 2002, "polls and elections in the PMR may to some extent have been rigged".

== Results ==
| Candidate | Party | Votes | % |
|---|---|---|---|
| Igor Smirnov | | 208,617 | 81.85 |
| Tom Zenovich | Independent | 17,018 | 6.68 |
| Alexander Radchenko | Power to the People | 11,853 | 4.65 |
| None of the above | | 17,375 | 6.82 |
| Invalid/blank votes | | 17,375 | – |
| Total | | 254,863 | 100 |
| Registered voters/turnout | | 405,248 | 62.89 |
Source: Olivia Press
