= Brian Brosnan =

Irish boxer

Brian Brosnan (1991-) is a boxer from Galway, Connacht, Ireland and was an under-21 national boxing champion, unbeaten from the age of 18–19. He fought in the European championship in 2012 but retired due to injury in the last 16. He was unable to return to the ring and remains the only boxer that was unbeaten in the age group of 18–21.

Brosnan is also a WAKO world kickboxing champion.
