= United Work Collective Council =

United Work Collective Council Объединённый Совет трудовых коллективов
- Abbreviation: OSTK
- Founded: 11 August 1989
- Ideology: Separatism; Republicanism

Website
- https://ostk-pmr.ru/

The United Work Collective Council (Russian: Объединённый Совет трудовых коллективов, romanized: Obedinyonnyy Sovet trudovykh kollevtivov) is an organization which led a political movement for the independence of Transnistria (also called Pridnestrovie) from the Republic of Moldova.

== Work collective councils ==
"Work collective councils" (Советы трудовых коллективов—STKs) were created throughout the Soviet Union in 1987 with the "Law on State Enterprises" as part of the perestroika reforms. They were intended to foster democratization and increase efficiency in Soviet industry.

When the Supreme Soviet of the Moldovan SSR proposed establishing Moldavian as the official language of the republic, at first with Russian as a coequal official language and later without, activist industrial leaders and workers used the STKs as a forum for discussion of the legislation and exploited the institutional structure of the STKs to take control of Moldovan industry.

== Strike campaign ==
As communism began to collapse at the end of the 1980s, people throughout the Soviet Union began to demand national sovereignty. While the idea of creating a nation-state independent of the Soviet Union, and possibly in a union with Romania, had a great deal of popularity throughout much of the Moldovan SSR, many industrial workers from Moldova's eastern periphery felt that their country was the Soviet Union and worked to prevent this "nationalization" of the Moldovan SSR.

When it was leaked to the press that the Moldovan Supreme Soviet was about to establish Moldavian as the only official language, industrial leaders and workers in the eastern city of Tiraspol created the United Work Collective Council (OSTK) to coordinate the activities of the city's many individual work collective councils. In effect, during this early period, the OSTK worked as a strike committee and used the work collective councils that existed in each state-run enterprise to shut down production.

When the OSTK was created on 11 August 1989, the first congress elected as its new chairman Boris Ștefan, a shop foreman from the "Elektromash" Electronics Concern and the chairman of that factory's STK.

The OSTK expanded quickly to cities throughout the Moldovan SSR and during the period of 16 August 16 to 22 September 1989, the OSTK brought over 200 factories and other state-run enterprises into the strike campaign. At its peak in early September, over 100,000 workers participated in the strike. However, in the face of as many as half a million demonstrators in the Moldovan capital demanding passage of the language laws, the strike campaign did not affect the course of events in the Supreme Soviet of the Moldovan SSR.

== Evolution to a political party ==
When the strike campaign failed to produce the expected results, OSTK activists turned their attention to upcoming elections. Using institutional resources and popularity acquired during the strike campaign, OSTK activists worked to get sympathizers elected to office, both on local and republican levels.

OSTK candidates fared well in the 25 February elections. In eastern Moldova, OSTK supporters took control of most of the major city and regional (rayon) soviets. In Tiraspol, Igor Smirnov, later the president of the Pridnestrovian Moldavian Republic, was able to handily defeat the Communist Party candidate for the position of chairman of the city Soviet. In the Supreme Soviet of the Moldovan SSR, however, the OSTK candidates were too few to affect legislation.

The power of the OSTK peaked in late 1989 and early 1990 when it controlled the republic's industrial enterprises. Once OSTK sympathizers were able to take control of governmental institutions, these proved to be much more expedient tools for achieving their goals.

The OSTK continues in its role as a "social organization".
