= Unification of Moldova and Romania =

Movement for uniting Moldova and Romania

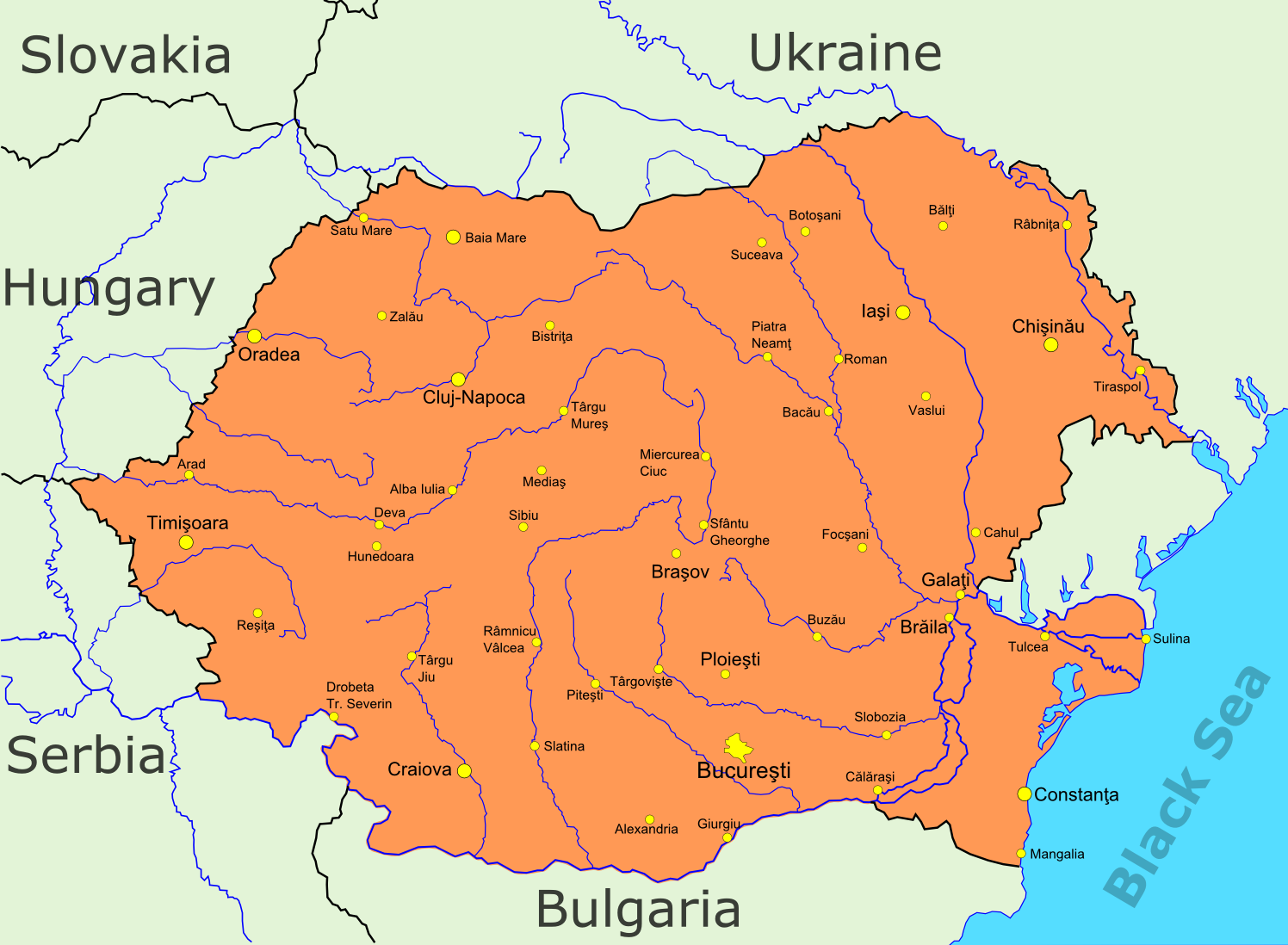
Map of a hypothetical union between Moldova and Romania showing the largest cities of the resulting country.

The unification of Moldova and Romania is the idea that Moldova and Romania should become a single sovereign state and the political movement which seeks to bring it about. Beginning during the Revolutions of 1989 (including the Romanian Revolution and the independence of Moldova from the Soviet Union), the movement's basis is in the cultural similarity of the two countries, both being Romanian-speaking, and their history of unity as part of Greater Romania and the shared heritage of the Principality of Moldavia.

The question of reunification is recurrent in the public sphere of the two countries, often as a speculation, both as a goal and a danger. Though historically Romanian support for unification has been high, a March 2022 survey following the Russian invasion of Ukraine indicated that 11% of Romania's population supported an immediate union, while over 42% considered it was not the right moment.

A majority in Moldova continues to oppose it. However, support in Moldova for reunification has increased significantly, with polls asking "if a referendum took place next Sunday regarding the unification of the Republic of Moldova and Romania, would you vote for or against the unification?" rising from approximately 20% to 44% support from 2015 to 2022. Support for unification with Romania is much lower in the more pro-Russian regions of Transnistria and Gagauzia than in the rest of Moldova.

Individuals who advocate the unification are usually called "unionists" (Romanian: unioniști). The supporters of the union may refer to the opponents as "Moldovenists" (moldoveniști). When referring to themselves as a group, opponents of the unification sometimes use the term "Statalists" (stataliști).

== Background ==
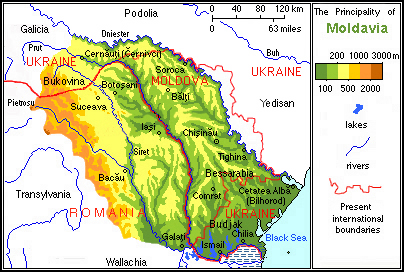
Moldavia and the modern boundaries

The Principality of Moldavia was established in 1359 with Bogdan I, a Romanian voivode from Maramureș, becoming its first independent ruler. In 1538 the country became a vassal state of the Ottoman Empire. Its eastern territories between the Prut and the Dniestr (approximately half of the principality corresponding roughly to today's territory of Moldova) were annexed by the Russian Empire in 1812, in accordance with the Treaty of Bucharest. The Russians referred to this new region as Bessarabia, taking a name that had previously only applied to a southern portion of the region (known also as the "Budjak") and extending it to cover the entire newly annexed territory. The name derives from the Wallachian Basarab dynasty, who had ruled over the southern region in the Middle Ages. During the Russian Revolution of 1917, a newly formed regional parliament (Sfatul Țării) declared Bessarabia's autonomy within Russia. In 1918, after the Romanian army entered Bessarabia, the makeshift parliament decided on independence, only to review its position and ultimately decide on a conditional union with Romania. The conditions, including the provisions for autonomy, were ultimately dropped. This unification is now commemorated by unionists in Romania and Moldova as the Day of the Union of Bessarabia with Romania on 27 March.

In 1940, during World War II, Romania agreed to an ultimatum and ceded Bessarabia and northern Bukovina to the Soviet Union, which organized Bessarabia into the Moldavian SSR. In mid-1941, Romania joined the Axis powers in the invasion of the Soviet Union, recovering both territories, as well as occupying the territory to the east of the Dniester it dubbed "Transnistria". By the end of World War II, the Soviet Union had reconquered all of these territories, reestablishing Soviet authority there. The Soviets strongly promoted the Moldovan ethnic identity, against other opinions that viewed all speakers of the Romanian language as part of a single ethnic group, taking advantage of the incomplete integration of Bessarabia into interwar Romania.

The official Soviet policy also stated that Romanian and Moldovan were two different languages and, to emphasize this distinction, Moldovan had to be written in a new Cyrillic alphabet (the Moldovan Cyrillic alphabet) based on the reformed Russian Cyrillic, rather than the obsolete Romanian Cyrillic alphabet that ceased to be used in the 19th century in the Old Kingdom and 1917 in Bessarabia.

=== Developments after 1989 ===
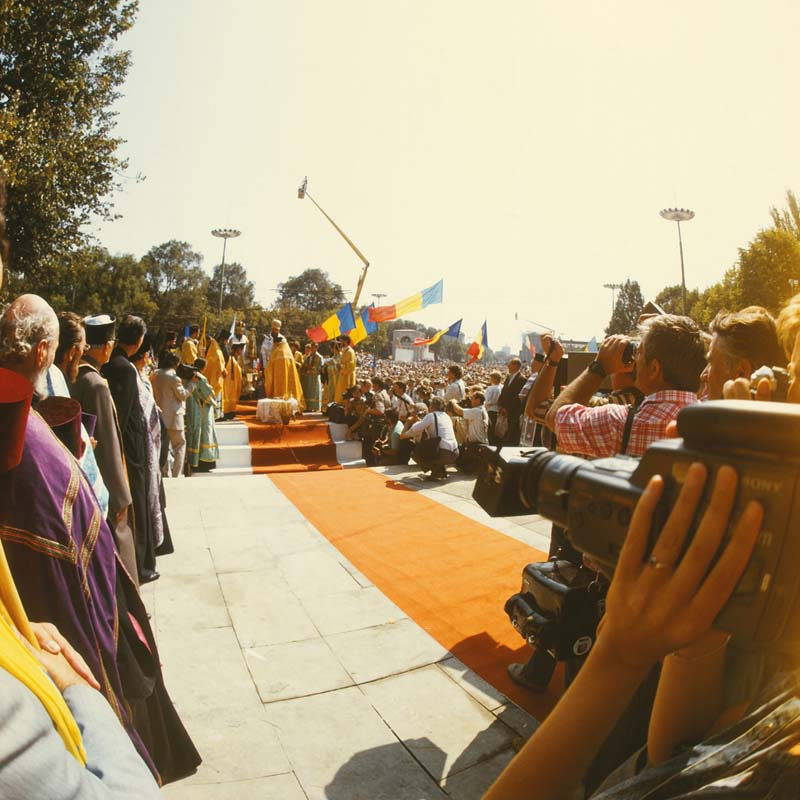
Celebration of the Romanian language, Chișinău, 31 August 1989 or 1990

In September 1989, with the liberalization in the Soviet Union, the parliament of the Moldovan SSR declared Moldovan as the official language, and asserted the existence of a "Moldovan-Romanian linguistic identity".

On 6 May 1990, after several decades of strict separation, Romania and the Moldovan SSR temporarily lifted border crossing restrictions, and thousands of people crossed the Prut River which marked their common border.

The factors hindering the unification were complex, ranging from the caution of political leaders in Moldova and Romania, the war in Transnistria, and, perhaps more importantly, the mentality of large parts of the population in Moldova (and to some extent in Romania) who were indifferent or opposed to such a project. In his address to the Romanian parliament, in February 1991, Moldova's first President Mircea Snegur spoke of a common identity of Moldovans and Romanians, referring to the "Romanians of both sides of the Prut River". In June 1991, Snegur talked about Moldova moving toward the reunification with Romania, adding that the Soviet Union was not making great efforts to stop it.

While many Moldovan intellectuals supported the union and wanted a "reunion with the Romanian motherland", there was little popular support for it, with more than 70% of the Moldovans opposing it, according to a 1992 poll. At the same time, Transnistria, the eastern part of Moldova, inhabited by similar numbers of Moldavians, Russians, and Ukrainians, used the putative danger of unification with Romania as a pretext for its own aspirations for staying with Russia.

On 26 June 1991, at the request of Larry Pressler, the U.S. Senate adopted a resolution which supported the unification of Moldova and Northern Bukovina with Romania.

=== Political ties and unionism ===
Following the declaration of independence on 27 August 1991, the Romanian flag defaced with the Moldovan coat of arms and the Romanian anthem "Deșteaptă-te, române!" became the symbols of the new independent Moldova. Following the growing tension between the pro-union governing Moldovan Popular Front and president Snegur, in particular over unification, the president moved closer to the Moldovanist group of Agrarians, and appointed their candidate Andrei Sangheli as prime minister. As a result, and especially after the victory of Agrarians in the 1994 elections, Moldova began distancing itself from Romania. The state flag was slightly modified, and the anthem changed to "Limba noastră". The Moldovan referendum of 1994 for an independent Moldova was seen by many public figures to be aimed at implicitly excluding a union with Romania. Furthermore, the constitution adopted in 1994 by the new Parliament dominated by Moldovanist Agrarians and Socialists called the official language "Moldovan", as opposed to the earlier Declaration of independence that called it "Romanian". The attempt by Moldovan president Mircea Snegur in 1996 to change the name of the official language to "Romanian" was dismissed by the Moldovan Parliament as "promoting Romanian expansionism".

In an interview, former Romanian President Ion Iliescu, who is criticized for failing to unify Romania with Moldova as soon as the latter declared its independence from the Soviet Union, explained that Romania alone, without international support (including from the Western countries) and without the wish of the politicians in Chișinău, was unable to achieve this unification.

A "Concept on National Policy" was adopted in 2003 by the Communist dominated Parliament, stating that Moldovans and Romanians are different peoples, and that the latter are an ethnic minority in Moldova.

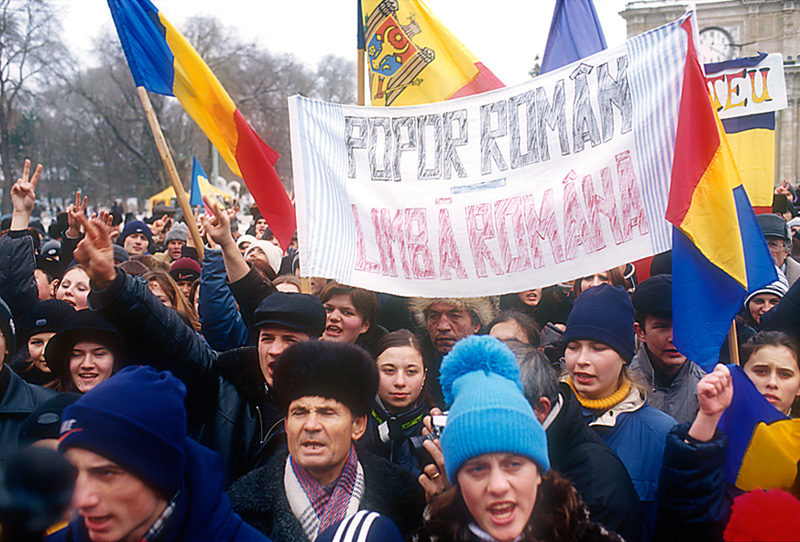
Opposition demonstration in Chișinău in January 2002. The text on the inscription reads "Romanian people–Romanian language".

Before 2005, only the Christian-Democratic People's Party, one of the political heirs of the Moldovan Popular Front, actively supported unification. However, the stance of the Christian-Democrats changed significantly after they started collaborating closely with the ruling Moldovan Communists. During the elections of April 2009, the alliance of National Liberal Party (Partidul Național Liberal) and the European Action Movement (Mișcarea Acțiunea Europeană) ran on a common platform of a loose union with Romania, but accumulated only around 1% of the votes.

On 2 March 2023, the Moldovan parliament voted the change of the state language from "Moldovan" to Romanian. The idea was supported by the ruling Party of Action and Solidarity and was strongly opposed by the Bloc of Communists and Socialists. The Academy of Sciences of Moldova also supported this decision.

== Political commentary ==
=== 2000s ===
In 2004 and later, the Romanian newspaper Ziua published a series of articles and interviews with Stanislav Belkovsky, an influential Russian political commentator, who proposed a plan of a unification of Romania and Moldova excluding Transnistria. Speculations followed whether his plan is backed by higher circles in the Kremlin, but they were never confirmed. Nevertheless, several journalists and scholars dismissed the plan as a diversion, also pointing out several ambiguities, such as the status of the city of Bender situated on the right bank of Dniester but under Transnistrian control, and, more importantly, the unlikelihood of Moldova's acquiescence to such a plan.

In January 2006, the Romanian president Traian Băsescu declared that he strongly supported the Moldovan bid for joining the European Union and that "the minimal policy of Romania is for the unification of the Romanian nation to take place within the EU". The phrase "minimal policy" led to questions whether there is also a maximal policy. In July of the same year, Băsescu claimed to have made a proposal to the Moldovan president Vladimir Voronin that "Moldova join the EU together with Romania in 2007" and that the alleged offer was rejected. Băsescu also added that Romania would respect this decision and would help Moldova to join EU on its own.

In October 2006, the Romanian newspaper Cotidianul estimated the cost of a union with Moldova at €30–35 billion, and attracted criticism from the Romanian newspaper Ziua, as well as Timpul for exaggerating the costs and disregarding other dimensions of a possible union.

After the Moldovan parliamentary election of April 2009, the 2009 Moldova civil unrest, the Moldovan parliamentary election of July 2009 and the creation of the governing Alliance for European Integration, a new wave of speculations about the union followed. The Party of Communists, now in opposition, claimed "the unionists came to power." In a November 2009 interview, political commentator Stanislav Belkovsky declared that the April 2009 election marked the beginning of the process of Moldova's return to Romania.

Traian Băsescu made a state visit to Moldova along with a number of ministers to announce several projects that would intensify ties between the two countries, and the offer of 100 million euro grant for infrastructure projects. Băsescu called Moldova his "soul project". Private Romanian investments are also expected to increase significantly, with the opening of a Moldovan-Romanian business and investment office, and the takeover of the online news portal Unimedia by Romanian group Realitatea-Cațavencu group, owned by businessman Sorin Ovidiu Vântu.

=== 2010s ===
On 15 February 2010, the Lipcani–Rădăuți-Prut border crossing between Romania and Moldova opened and the remnant Soviet barbed wire fence on the Moldovan side of the border with Romania was dismantled.

In January 2010, Mircea Druc, the former prime minister of Moldova between 1990 and 1991, declared that the unification of Romania and the Republic of Moldova is inevitable. A similar statement was also made by Russian political analyst Vladimir Bruter and by the pro-Russian Moldovan commentator Zurab Todua, both claiming in a Russian TV Show that the split of the Romanian people is a "tragedy", and, if the people want the unification of the 2 countries, it will happen and the global powers can't oppose it. However, acting President Mihai Ghimpu denied in an interview with the Russian language newspaper Komsomolskaya Pravda v Moldove that such a move will be taken, stating that a union is not included in the program of the governing coalition. On another occasion he declared that if the people wanted unification, neither he, nor anyone else could stop them. He admitted on several occasions to personally share unionist views. However, in August 2010 he declared that the proposition of an "inter-state union" between Romania and Moldova was "a very stupid" idea.

On 27 November 2013, a day before participation in the Eastern Partnership Summit in Vilnius, Romanian President Traian Băsescu was invited to an interview at the national TV station, TVR. There he said that the third priority for Romania, after joining NATO and the EU, must be the union with Moldova. "I'm convinced that if there is a unionist current in Moldova, Romania will say 'yes' without hesitation", stated the Head of State. In present, Romania supports the full integration of Moldova into the EU. The mayor of Chișinău Dorin Chirtoacă welcomed the statements made by Băsescu. On the other hand, the Moldovan prime-minister, Iurie Leancă, described Băsescu's declaration as "creating crucial problems" for Moldova and affirmed his government's support for a sovereign Moldova. Positions similar to Leancă's were taken by the other leaders of the pro-European ruling coalition, Vlad Filat and Marian Lupu, as well as by Vladimir Voronin, leader of the main opposition party. However, in the latter years, Filat and Leancă became supporters of the unification, due to rapid development of the Romanian economy.

In April 2016, former minister of defence and army general Victor Gaiciuc (who is considered to be close to former president Igor Dodon) called the unionist idea a danger for Moldova's sovereignty and that he is a statalist. He also added that, however, if the Moldovans decide through a referendum to unite with Romania, he will not oppose it.

In August 2016, American ambassador to Moldova, James Pettit, declared that Moldova is not Romania and that the Moldovan people have their own history and identity. He also added that Moldova should join the European Union as an independent state. He later declared, in September 2016, after a meeting with the Moldovan unionist politician Mihai Ghimpu, that he respects the unionists' ideal and the natural desire of Moldovans to unite with Romania. In 2018, Romanian historian Mircea Dogaru wrote a public letter to Pettit, criticising his anti-unionist position.

Historian Victor Stepaniuc, known for his Moldovenist position, stated in 2016 that if Moldova cannot succeed as an independent state, then the only solution is the unification with Romania.

In 2017, Dumitru Diacov (founder and honorary president of the Democratic Party of Moldova) said that the unification project is unrealistic at present, and that unification will probably be possible in 100 years.

In October 2019, Romanian politician Kelemen Hunor declared that, although he understands the wish of Romanians to unite with Moldova, the latter would not give up its independence to become some counties in eastern Romania and that, in his opinion, it is the best for Moldova to join the European Union, but remain independent.

=== 2020s ===
Petrișor Peiu (professor at Politehnica University of Bucharest, known for being a unionist advocate) criticized the lack of unionist elements in the speech of Romanian leaders (such as Klaus Iohannis), focusing exclusively on "European integration", not on reunification. He also claimed that he asked Romanian politicians why they don't support the unification, and they answered: "Germany doesn't want it". At the same time, Oana Ursache (USR PLUS), state secretary of the Department for Romanians everywhere, cut off the financing of "Mesager bucovinean", one of the most important newspapers for the Romanian community in Ukraine. Furthermore, during the 2021 Moldovan elections, Romanian defense minister Nicolae Ciucă (PNL) stated that, between unification with Romania and the European integration, Romania supports Moldova's European integration as a sovereign state. In November 2021, Moldovan foreign minister Nicu Popescu said that most of the Moldovan citizens don't support a unification with Romania, and that he also supports an independent Moldovan state.

Following the 2022 Russian invasion of Ukraine, the idea of a union of Moldova with Romania has again become a topic discussed in the press. Supporters of the idea (such as the Romanian historian Marius Oprea) argue that the unification would strengthen NATO's eastern flank and defend Moldova in the event of an escalation of the Transnistrian conflict. Former Moldovan Prime Minister Iurie Leancă said that the only way Moldova can be protected from Russia is to unite with Romania. On the other hand, Moldovan President Maia Sandu said that the union with Romania can be achieved only if the Moldovan population wants it. Asked about what he thinks about the unification in the new context, Moldovan foreign minister Nicu Popescu stated that only the Moldovan people can decide their future. Furthermore, Moldovan Prime Minister Natalia Gavrilița said the unification with Romania is not being taken into account. She also said that Moldova wants to join the European Union, but not NATO.

In January 2023, Russian deputies Leonid Kalashnikov and Svetlana Zhurova warned that Moldova's intentions to unite with Romania, and thus joining NATO, may lead to its destruction. On 2 February 2023, Russian foreign minister Sergey Lavrov declared that Moldova might have Ukraine's fate (meaning to be attacked by Russia) if the Moldovan president Maia Sandu, who has Romanian citizenship, wants Moldova to unite with Romania and join NATO. Belkovsky stated that these declarations of Russian political figures might accelerate the unification of Moldova and Romania.

Several political and public figures in Romania have said that Maia Sandu could run for the presidency of Romania in 2024, similarly to Alexandru Ioan Cuza, having Romanian citizenship, citing Sandu's popularity among the Romanian population, thus achieving a de facto unification. On 16 February 2023, Sandu addressed this issue, stating she has no intention of running for any office in Romania.

On 23 May 2023, two days after a large pro-European demonstration was organised by the Moldovan government in Chișinău, in an interview with Euronews România, Moldovan president Maia Sandu declared that there is not enough support for the unionist movement among Moldova's population, which is why Moldova is pursuing the path to join the European Union as an independent country.

On 18 July 2025, Nicușor Dan during his official visit to Germany expressed his personal support for unification with Moldova, but stressed that he would respect the will of its citizens during the interview with Frankfurter Allgemeine Zeitung.

On September 9, 2025, German MEP Lukas Sieper said that "Moldova is not Romania. Moldova is Europe, just like Romania".

In January 2026, both Moldovan President Maia Sandu and Moldovan Prime Minister Alexandru Munteanu declared that, in the event of a referendum on unification with Romania, they would vote 'YES.' However, both specified that while European integration enjoys majority support in Moldova, unification does not. They added that unification remains a scenario that cannot be ruled out, given the regional instability. On January 22, 2026, following these statements, when asked if he supports the unification of Moldova with Romania, Romanian President Nicușor Dan stated that 'we are not there yet,' citing the fact that the idea lacks majority popular support in Moldova. In February 2026, UDMR leader Hunor Kelemen declared that he wouldn't vote in a reunification referendum, stating that he opposes political revisionism and that Romania should support only Moldova joining the EU. On June 25, 2026, the Romanian Chamber of Deputies automatically advanced a far-right S.O.S. România bill calling for unification with Moldova after it was not debated before a deadline, resulting in tacit adoption in the lower house. The bill was not passed into law and was sent to the Senate, while the Romanian government issued a negative opinion on the initiative, stating that Romania's priority would remain supporting Moldova's path toward European Union membership rather than pursuing unilateral unification negotiations.

== Current trends ==
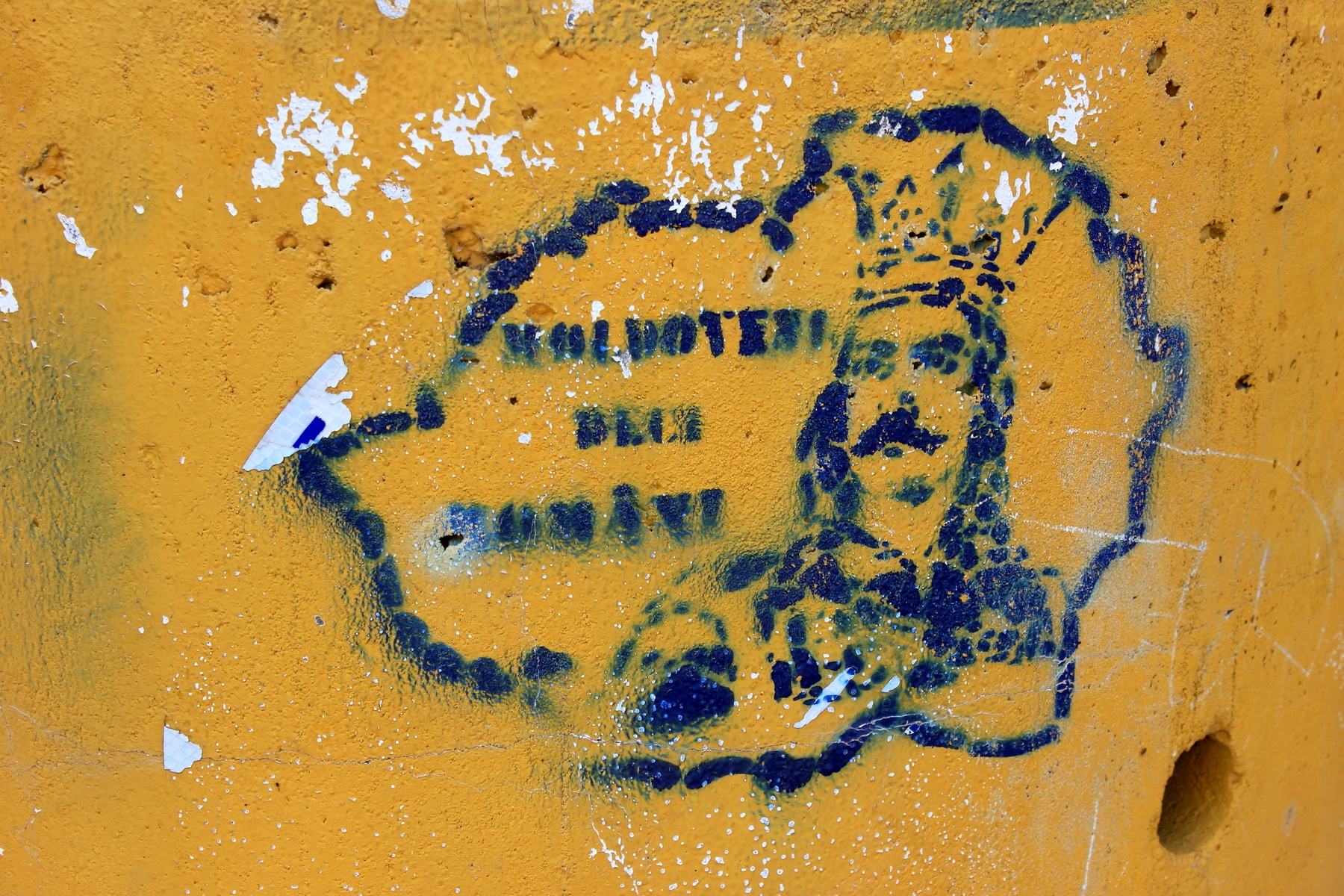
Graffiti with shapes of Greater Romania near Briceni, Moldova, with a portrait of Stephen the Great, a national hero in both countries.

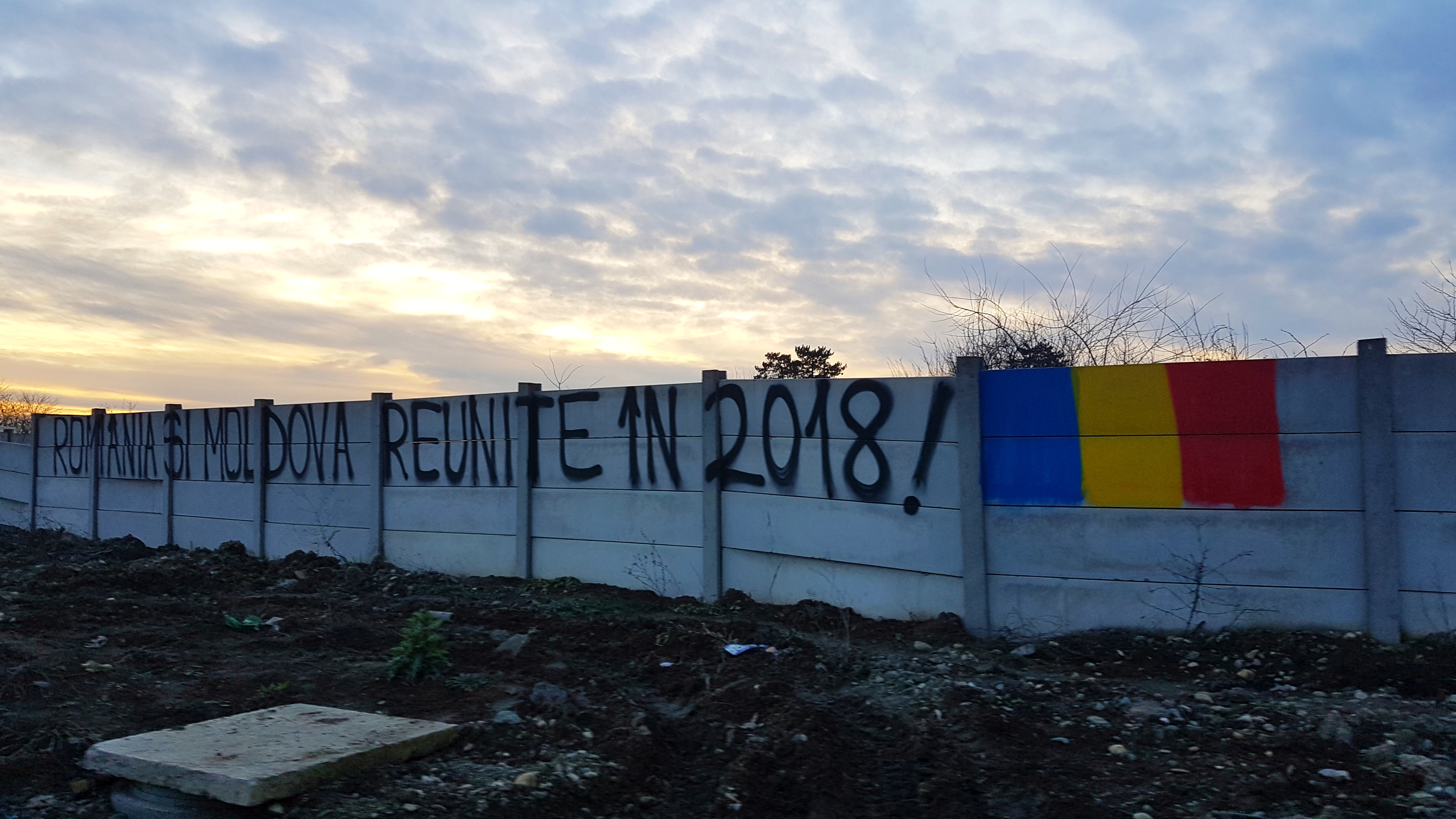
"Romania and Moldova Reunite in 2018!" graffiti seen on a wall adjacent to Bucharest Ring in December 2017

=== Dual citizenship for Moldovan citizens ===
A poll conducted by IPP Chișinău in November 2007 shows that 33.6% of the Moldovan population is interested in holding Romanian citizenship, while 58.8% is not interested. The main reason of those interested is: feeling Romanian (31.9%), the possibility of traveling to Romania (48.9%), and the possibility of traveling and/or working in the EU (17.2%).

Between 1991 and 2009, some 140,000 Moldovan citizens obtained Romanian citizenship. According to some estimates, as many as 1 million Moldovan citizens requested Romanian citizenship by 2009. In 2010, the Romanian government created the National Authority for Citizenship to process the large number of applications for Romanian citizenship coming especially from Moldovan citizens. The study "Reacquiring Romanian citizenship: historical, comparative and applied perspectives", released in 2012, estimated that 226,507 Moldovan citizens reacquired Romanian citizenship by 15 August 2011 Between 15 August 2011 and 15 October 2012, an additional 90,000 reacquired Romanian citizenship, according to the National Authority for Citizenship, bringing the total to 320,000.

A 2013 study by the Soros Foundation Romania found that from the passing of the citizenship law in 1991 until the end of 2012, the number of successful applications from Moldova was 323,049. This is an increase of 96,542 successful applications since 15 August 2011. In the same period, the number of applications was 449,783, meaning that around 125,000 applications still need to be finalised. In 2011 and 2012, 100,845 and 87,015 applications were submitted respectively. The actual number of persons granted citizenship in these applications remains unclear because each application may include minors dependent on the adult filing. The number of persons is estimated to be around 400,000, with a potential of 150,000 more persons if all outstanding applications are successful.

Between 1 January 2010 and 5 November 2021 as many as 1,027,091 Moldovan citizens acquired Romanian citizenship, of which 746,695 were adults and 280,396 minors.

Year	Number of files processed (adults)
1991–2001	108,000
2002–2008	7,500
2009	22,000
2010	41,800
2011	69,800
2012	73,800
2013	64,900
2014	61,800
2015	47,300
2016	63,000
2017	85,400
2018	47,200
2019	43,600
2020	73,900
2021	42,400
Total	852,400

=== Action 2012 ===
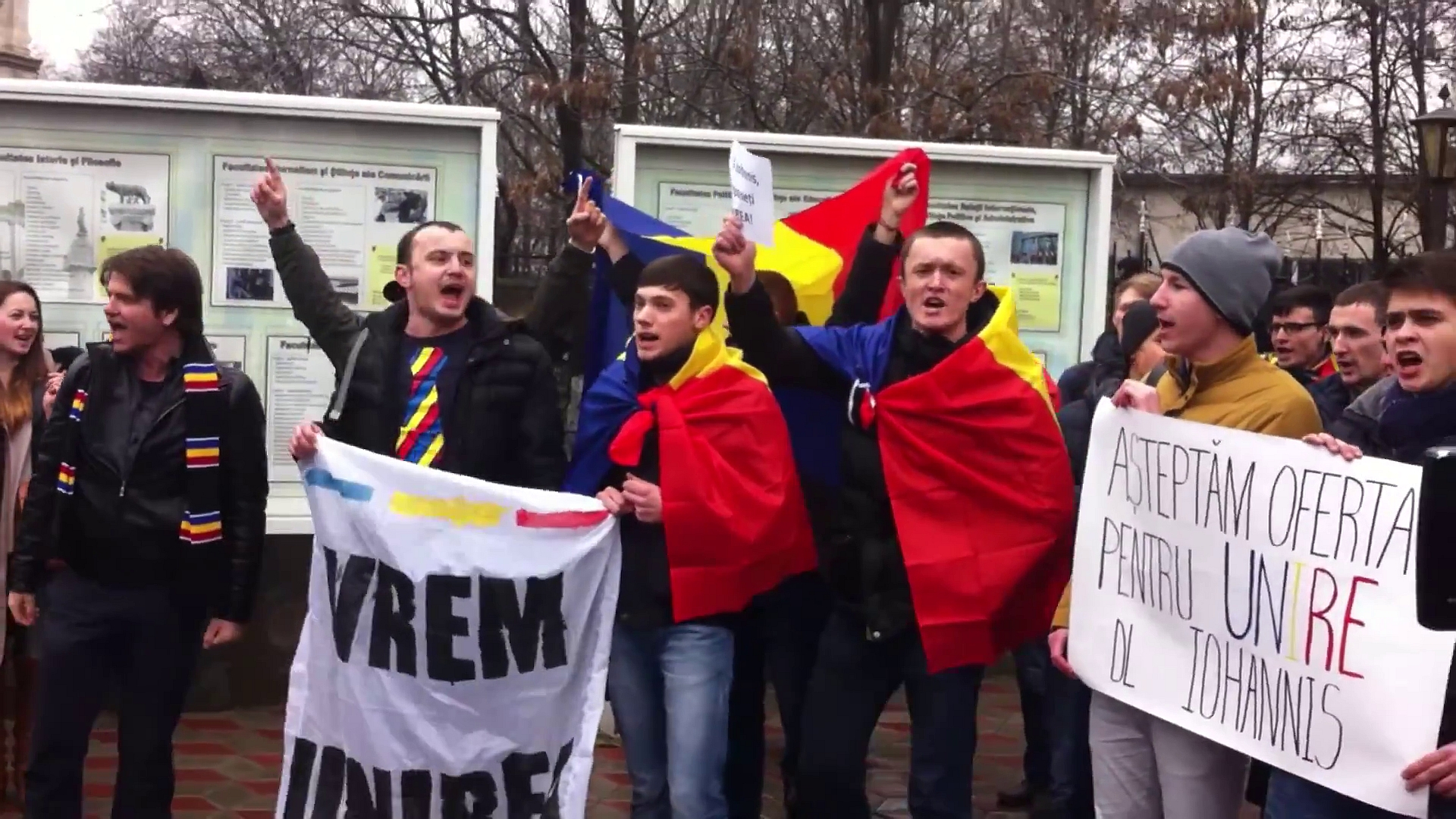
Young protesters demanding Romanian president, Klaus Iohannis, the unification in Chișinău, in February 2015

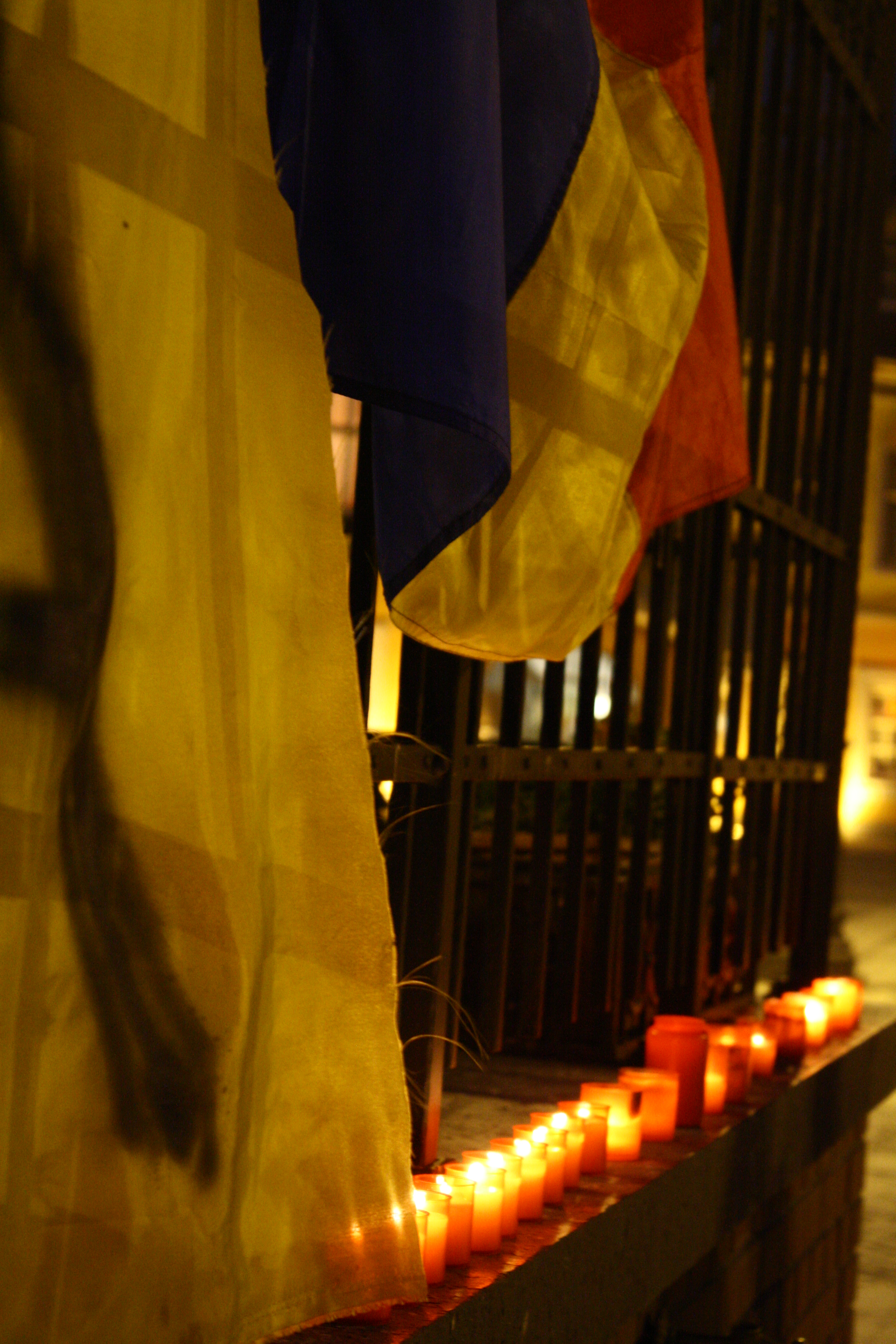
Meeting for unification in Sibiu, on 8 April 2009

In April 2011, a coalition of NGOs from Romania and Moldova created the civic platform Action 2012 (Acțiunea 2012), whose aim is to "raise awareness of the necessity of the unification between Romania and the Republic of Moldova". Year 2012 was chosen as a reference to the bicentennial commemoration of the 1812 division of historical Moldavia, when the Russian Empire annexed what would later be called Bessarabia. The proponents see the unification as a reversal of this historical division, a reversal inspired by the rather short-lived Union of Bessarabia with Romania (1918–1940) disrupted by the Soviet occupation.

=== Union Council ===
In February 2012, the Union Council was created to "gather all unionists" in order to "promote the idea of Romanian national unity". Among the signatories: Mircea Druc former Moldovan prime-minister, Alexandru Mosanu former speaker of the Moldovan Parliament, Vitalia Pavlicenco president of the Moldovan National Liberal Party, Vladimir Beșleagă writer, Constantin Tănase director of the Moldovan newspaper Timpul de dimineață, Val Butnaru president of Jurnal Trust Media, Oleg Brega journalist and activist, Nicu Țărnă soloist of the Moldovan rock band Gândul Mâței, and Tudor Ionescu, president of the Romanian neo-fascist association Noua Dreaptă, Valentin Dolganiuc, former Moldovan MP, Eugenia Duca, Moldovan businesswoman, Anton Moraru, Moldovan professor of history, Eugen Mihalache, vice president of People's Party, Dan Diaconescu and others.

=== National Unity Bloc (BUN) ===
Created on May 16, 2015, as a coalition of 30 NGO Support unification of Republic of Moldova with Romania Head Persons: Ion Leascenco (actual leader), Anatol Ursu, Constantin Codreanu (former leader), Oleg Chicu, Lucia Vieru, Vitalie Prisacaru, Artemis Balan, Claudia Iovita

=== Sfatul Țării 2 ===
On March 27, 2016, the unionists formed the "Sfatul Țării 2", self-proclaimed successor of Sfatul Țării. It included representatives of each district, as well as representatives of ethnic-religious minorities. At the end of the meeting, symbolically, the "declaration of the reunification of Moldova with Romania" was adopted. Among the participants there were Nicolae Dabija, Mircea Druc, Ion Ungureanu, Alexandru Moșanu, Alecu Reniță, Mihai Cimpoi, Ion Negrei, Eugen Doga, Arcadie Suceveanu, Nicolae Botgros, Ion Varta, Petru Hadârcă, Iurie Colesnic, Gheorghe Mustea, Ninela Caranfil, Ion Iovcev, Octavian Țîcu, Sandu Grecu, Vasile Iovu, Petru Bogatu, Vladimir Beșleagă and Silviu Tănase.

=== Union marches ===
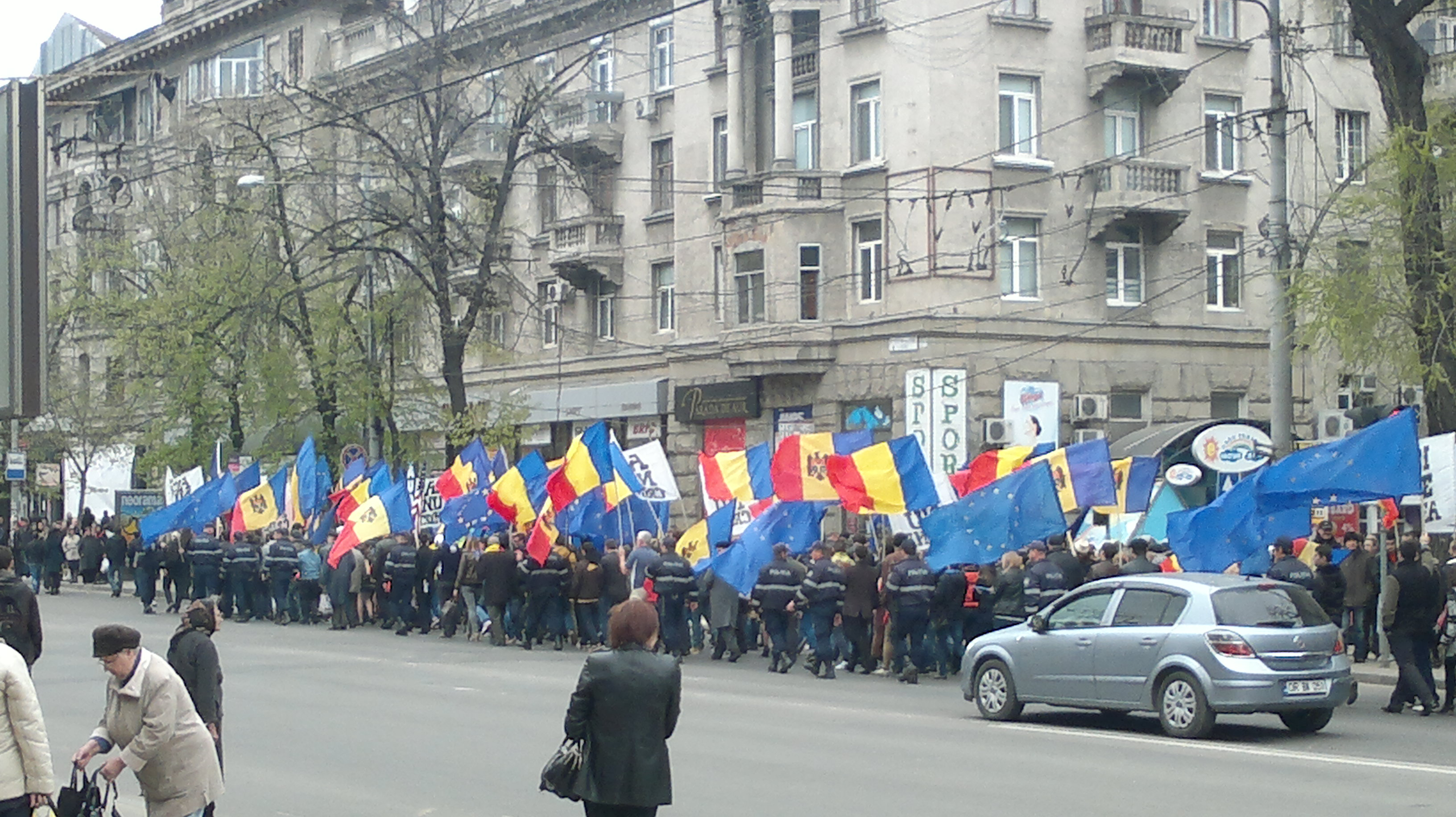
Pro-European demonstration in Chișinău, on 6 April 2014

The newly created Action 2012 and Union Council initiative groups organized several manifestations in support of the unification throughout 2012. The first one was a rally of 2,000 to 3,000 people in Chișinău on 25 March 2012, held as an anniversary of the Union of Bessarabia with Romania on 27 March 1918. Larger rallies took place on 13 May (which commemorated 200 years of the 1812 Treaty of Bucharest and the first Russian annexation of Bessarabia) and on 16 September. A union march was also held in Bucharest in October 2012 and was attended by several thousand people. Smaller-scale manifestations took place in the Moldovan cities of Cahul and Bălți on 22 July and 5 August respectively. Various intellectuals and artists from both countries supported the marches, while Moldovan Speaker Marian Lupu and Prime Minister Vlad Filat opposed them. The rallies in Bucharest were later repeated in October 2013 and October 2014. Also, in September 2014, another rally took place in Chișinău, during which a 300-metre long Romanian flag was carried through the central street of the city. On 16 May 2015, between 5,000 (police estimates) and 25,000 people (organizers' estimate) demonstrated for unification in Chișinău, in what has been claimed to be the largest pro-Romanian protests since the 1990s. Another protest, attracting between 5,000 and 30,000 people (organizers' claim), took place on 5 July 2015 in Chișinău. Around a thousand young people from among the participants headed to Bucharest in the "March of Stephen the Great" (Romanian: Marșul lui Ștefan cel Mare) calling for the unification of Moldova with Romania. The march lasted a week, from 5 to 11 July. In the Republic of Moldova, the march followed the route Strășeni–Lozova–Călărași–Cornești–Ungheni. Participants crossed the Prut River, on 11 July at 10 a.m., in a large-scale reenactment of the Bridges of Flowers in 1990. Their march ended in Bucharest, where were greeted by several hundred Romanian citizens in University Square, before making their way to the Cotroceni Palace to call on Romanian President Klaus Iohannis to support the unification project. Former Moldovan President Vladimir Voronin has sharply condemned the march to Romania. In a letter to European Parliament President Martin Schulz, released on 7 July, Voronin accused Bucharest of fomenting "the destruction and annexation of Moldova".

On 22 September 2015, the Governments of Romania and the Republic of Moldova held a bilateral reunion in Neptun, Constanța county, where over 300 unionists demonstrated. Their representatives obtained access to the meeting, discussing with the Minister of Foreign Affairs about common projects. The unionists announced the "Reunification Agenda 2018", some of their claims being accepted and decided within the intergovernmental meeting.

In 2018, centennial celebration of the Great Union, a demonstration called the Centenary March was organized by several Romanian and Moldovan activists for unification. It started in Alba Iulia on 1 July 2018 and ended in Chișinău on 1 September 2018. One of its main objectives was to achieve the unification of Moldova with Romania. The participants tried to collect 1 million signatures for the organization of a referendum. Although at first the Moldovan authorities prohibited the participants to cross the border, they were allowed to enter later.

== Public opinion ==
=== Moldova ===
The International Republican Institute in partnership with Gallup, Inc. regularly conducts polls in the Republic of Moldova on several social and political issues. The following results reflect the public stance in Moldova on the question of reunification:

Date	Question	Fully support	Somewhat support	Somewhat oppose	Fully oppose	Don't know/No opinion
Jan–Feb 2011	Excluding the impact of potential Moldovan membership in the European Union, do you support unification of Moldova with Romania?	10%	18%	16%	47%	9%
Aug–Sep 2011	Do you support or oppose the reunification of the Republic of Moldova with Romania?	11%	20%	16%	43%	10%

A poll conducted by IRI in Moldova in November 2008 showed that 29% of the population would support a union with Romania, while 61% would reject it.

The pro-Unionist NGO "Romanian Centre of Strategic Studies" published reports claiming significantly higher support for the idea:

Date	Question	Fully support	Somewhat support	Somewhat oppose	Fully oppose	Don't know/No opinion
Feb 2014	Do you support or oppose the reunification of the Republic of Moldova with Romania? (excluding Gagauzia and Transnistria)	27%	25%	20%	12%	15%

The Public Opinion Barometer (BOP), released twice a year in Moldova at the initiative of IPP (Institute of Public Policy), included beginning with its November 2015 edition a question about the reunification

Date	Question	For unification	Against unification	I wouldn't vote	I don't know/ I haven't decided	No answer
November 2015	If a referendum took place next Sunday regarding the unification of the Republic of Moldova and Romania, would you vote for or against the unification?	20.6%	52.7%	9.4%	13.8%	3.5%
April 2016	If a referendum took place next Sunday regarding the unification of the Republic of Moldova and Romania, would you vote for or against the unification?	17.3%	66.1%	4%	11.5%	1.1%
October 2016	If a referendum took place next Sunday regarding the unification of the Republic of Moldova and Romania, would you vote for or against the unification?	15.6%	63.8%	8.1%	11.8%	0.8%
April 2017	If a referendum took place next Sunday regarding the unification of the Republic of Moldova and Romania, would you vote for or against the unification?	23.0%	58.1%	8.2%	8.6%	2.0%
November 2017	If a referendum took place next Sunday regarding the unification of the Republic of Moldova and Romania, would you vote for or against the unification?	21.7%	56.2%	7.1%	12.7%	2.3%
April 2018	If a referendum took place next Sunday regarding the unification of the Republic of Moldova and Romania, would you vote for or against the unification?	24.0%	57.0%	9.0%	9.0%	1.0%
October 2020	If you were asked to vote regarding the unification of the Republic of Moldova and Romania, would you vote for or against it?	33.3%	48.3%	3.5%	12.8%	2%
June 2021	If you were asked to vote regarding the unification of the Republic of Moldova and Romania, would you vote for or against it?	41.4%	46%	3.7%	8.2%	0.7%
September 2025	If you were asked to vote regarding the unification of the Republic of Moldova and Romania, would you vote for or against it?	33.4%	45.7%	2.5%	16.7%	1.7%

The Socio-Political Barometer, released several times a year by IMAS Moldova, also included the question about the reunification

Date	Question	For unification	Against unification	I wouldn't vote	I don't know/ I haven't decided	No answer
August 2016	If a referendum took place next Sunday regarding the unification of the Republic of Moldova and Romania, would you vote for or against the unification?	19.0%	55.0%	7.0%	16.0%	4.0%
May 2017	If a referendum took place next Sunday regarding the unification of the Republic of Moldova and Romania, would you vote for or against the unification?	24.0%	65.0%	4.0%	7.0%	0.0%
July 2017	If a referendum took place next Sunday regarding the unification of the Republic of Moldova and Romania, would you vote for or against the unification?	25.0%	61.0%	4.0%	15.0%	3.0%
December 2017	If a referendum took place next Sunday regarding the unification of the Republic of Moldova and Romania, would you vote for or against the unification?	32.0%	54.0%	3.0%	9.0%	3.0%
February 2018	If a referendum took place next Sunday regarding the unification of the Republic of Moldova and Romania, would you vote for or against the unification?	25.0%	62.0%	3.0%	8.0%	2.0%
December 2019	If a referendum took place next Sunday regarding the unification of the Republic of Moldova and Romania, would you vote for or against the unification?	34.0%	54.0%	3.0%	8.0%	1.0%
June 2020	If a referendum took place next Sunday regarding the unification of the Republic of Moldova and Romania, would you vote for or against the unification?	37.0%	52.0%	2.0%	7.0%	2.0%
April 2021	In the case you were sure that salaries and pensions in the Republic of Moldova will become the same as those in Romania, would you vote for or against unification?	50.0%	43.0%	Not an option	7.0%	0.0%

The polls conducted by FOP presented the following results

Date	Question	For unification	Against unification	I wouldn't vote	I don't know/ I haven't decided	No answer
11 – 20 March 2016	If next Sunday a referendum took place for the unification of the Republic of Moldova and Romania you would vote	23%	63%	7%	6%	0%
June 2020	If a referendum took place next Sunday regarding the unification of the Republic of Moldova and Romania, would you vote for or against the unification?	33%	55%	4%	7%	1%

The company iData has regularly included a question about unification in its polls. One from the second half of March 2021, with 1,314 participants, stated that 43.9% of Moldova would vote to reuniting with Romania if given a referendum within a week, and 67.8% of Moldova wanted to join the European Union (EU). Another poll from the same company, conducted between May 19–28 of 2021, with 1,227 participants, determined that 41.6% of Moldova would vote to unite with Romania if given a referendum within a week, and 67.3% of Moldova supported joining the EU.

Another poll was organized in June 2021 by a group of several companies. On it, 35.0% of Moldovans said they would vote for unification with Romania and 47.3% said they would vote against. The number of people in favor of the unification increased to 41.2% as shown by a poll from iData made between 21 and 28 July 2021 with 1,065 participants, including some from Transnistria. The collaboration between the two countries during the COVID-19 pandemic has also led to an increase in the number of supporters of the unification.

In September 2021, iData made a new poll, in which 70% of Moldovans expressed their desire to join the European Union and in which 40% of Moldovans declared they supported the unification of Moldova and Romania. In October 2021, 43.8% of participants of a poll of the same company voted for the unification with Romania, this number being 41.2% in a November 2021 poll.

A January 2022 poll from iData showed that 38.4% of Moldovans would support unification with Romania. Later, a January–February 2022 poll by CBS Research showed that 34.4% of Moldovans would want to unite with Romania and that 49.9% would oppose this. A posterior poll conducted between 27 April and 6 May 2022 showed 35.2% of Moldovans favored union while 50.6% opposed it. Another poll made between 5 May and 14 May showed 34.7% of Moldovans supported union and 49.7% of them opposed it.

In May 2022, a poll in Moldova found that 30.7% supported reunification, while 27.1% were in favour of recognizing Transnistria's independence. In June 2022, another Moldovan poll found 35.2% supported unification. In September 2022, 34.6% of Moldovans did so. This increased to 39.7% in a 29 September–11 October poll, believed to be because of changes in Romanian legislation that allowed the sale of electricity to Moldova at preferential prices to combat the country's energy crisis at the time. According to a poll conducted between 16 and 23 November, 42.5% of Moldovans would vote in favor and 57.5% against.

A poll conducted in March 2026 by ATES Research Group and specially dedicated to the subject of reunification and national identity in Moldova showed that 44% would vote in favor and 39.2% against among Moldovan citizens living in Moldova, whereas among Moldovan citizens living abroad, the proportions were 60.8% in favor and 24.3% against.

=== Romania ===
A poll conducted in November–December 2010 and extensively analyzed in the study The Republic of Moldova in the Romanian public awareness (Republica Moldova în conștiința publică românească) addressed the issue of reunification.

Question	Strongly agree	Partially agree	Partially disagree	Strongly disagree	Don't know/No opinion
Unification should be a national objective for Romania?	23%	29%	23%	11%	15%
Sooner or later, the Republic of Moldova and Romania should unite upon the German model?	16%	29%	16%	11%	28%

A similar survey carried out in Romania in June 2012 by the Romanian Centre of Strategic Studies showed the following results:

Question	Yes	No	Don't know/No opinion
Do you believe that the language spoken in Bessarabia is Romanian?	71.9%	11.9%	16.2%
Do you believe that Bessarabia is a Romanian land?	84.9%	4.7%	10.4%
Do you agree with the unification of Bessarabia with Romania?	86.5%	12.7%	0.8%
Do you consider that the unification of Bessarabia with Romania should be a priority for Romanian politicians?	55.2%	20.5%	24.2%

Question	Romanians	Moldovans	Russians	Don't know/No opinion
Do you consider that Bessarabians are primarily:	67.5%	28.2%	3.9%	0.3%

According to a poll conducted by the Romanian Institute for Evaluation and Strategy (IRES) on 29 November 2013, 76% of Romanians agree with the union of Romania and Moldova, while 18% oppose a possible union.

Question	I agree	I don't agree	I Don't know
Do you personally agree with the unification of the Republic of Moldova with Romania	76%	18%	6%

A poll by INSCOP, conducted between 9–14 July 2015, asked about the unification by 2018.

Question	Answer
I support the unification of Romania with the Republic of Moldova by 2018 (the centennial anniversary of the Great Union)	67.9%
I do not support the unification of Romania with the Republic of Moldova by 2018 (the centennial anniversary of the Great Union)	14.8%
I don't know/no answer	17.3%

A poll conducted by Avangarde in 2023, on 850 people, showed the next results:

Question	Answer
I support the unification of Romania with the Republic of Moldova	33%
I do not support the unification of Romania with the Republic of Moldova	54%
I support Moldova joining NATO	40%
I don't know/no answer	13%

A poll conducted by CURS in January 2026, on 1067 respondents in Romania, showed that 56% support unification with Moldova and 37% oppose it.

== Impact of a unification scenario ==
Subdivision	Area (km^{2})	Population	Population Density (/km^{2})	GDP (billion US$)	GDP per capita (US$)
Romania	238,398	19,043,151	79.92	422	22,436
Moldova	33,843	2,381,325	74.25	20	8,984
Unified Romania	272,241 (▲14.20%)	21,424,467 (▲12.5%)	79.21 (▼0.89%)	442 (▲4.73%)	20,650 (▼8.40%)

The Republic of Moldova would bring an addition of 2.3 million inhabitants and an increase in Gross Domestic Product (GDP) of US$20.7 billion (4.9% of Romania's GDP) to Romania. If two countries were unified, its area will be 272,241 km^{2} (105,113 sq mi), and it will be the 75th largest country in the world. However, GDP per capita would fall to $20,650, as the current Romanian GDP per capita is estimated at US$22,436, while the Moldovan GDP per capita stands at US$8,900. It is estimated that unification would cost US$10 billion, that Moldova would be able to cover a US$1.5 billion, and that Romania would have to cover the US$8.5 billion difference. It has been proposed that the European Union would cover part of the cost.

If Moldova decided to unite with Romania, the status of Gagauzia, a "national-territorial autonomous unit" of Moldova with three official languages (Romanian, Gagauz, and Russian), would be unclear. While the autonomy of Gagauzia is guaranteed by the Moldovan constitution and regulated by the 1994 Gagauz Autonomy Act, the laws of Romania do not permit ethnic-based territorial autonomy and any other official language than Romanian.

When it comes to Transnistria, a non-recognised self-proclaimed state with three official languages (Moldovan, Russian, and Ukrainian), it is not clear what would happen upon unification. In fact, the popularity of unification idea contributed to the outbreak of the Transnistria War in 1992, when Transnistria declared independence from Moldova. The UN still recognizes Transnistria as part of Moldova.

== Unification scenarios ==
There are several possible scenarios for a possible unification of Moldavia with Romania:

- Merging into a single state into the present "de jure" (legal) borders (which implies the new state taking over Transnistria as a territorial unit without considerations for the Russian military presence in the area) and regardless of the political and administrative situation of the current territorial units, which can be preserved or reformed within the new state;
- Merging into a single state at the current "de facto" borders (which implies the new state giving up the territory controlled by the breakaway state of Transnistria, which will then have a choice between independence, joining Ukraine or joining Russia. The press called this the "Belkovsky Plan"). Romania could also give Transnistria to Ukraine, receiving an equal share in the area of Chernivtsi Oblast or Bilhorod-Dnistrovskyi Raion, Izmail Raion and Bolhrad Raion of Odesa Oblast, where important communities of Romanians exist, restoring the border along the Dniester River.
- Federalisation of the two states (which would keep the political sovereignty of each state) in an economic, monetary, customs and military community (this option is inspired by Mircea Snegur's "one people, two States" idea).

== Supporters of unification ==
=== Republic of Moldova ===
==== Political parties ====
- Alliance for the Union of Romanians
- Christian-Democratic People's Party (PPCD)
- European People's Party of Moldova (PPEM)
- Liberal Democratic Party of Moldova (PLDM), declared as aim the proposed union with Romania by 10 September 2018.
- National Unity Party (PUN), defunct
- Union Political Movement (MPU)
  - Liberal Party (PL)
  - National Liberal Party (PNL)
  - Romanian Popular Party (PPR)
  - Save Bessarabia Union (USB)
- Democracy at Home Party (PPDA)
- Unionist Movement of the Republic of Moldova (MURM)
- Antimafia Popular Movement
- Democratic Action Party

==== Political figures ====
- Vlad Bilețchi, civic activist, head of ODIP NGO, part of National Unity Bloc (BUN), president of the Moldovan branch of the Alliance for the Union of Romanians
- Dorin Chirtoacă, Mayor of Chișinău (2007–2017) and president of Liberal Party (PL)
- Constantin Codreanu, Moldovan and Romanian politician, Romanian MP, member of PUN and of PMP
- Vasile Costiuc, historian, journalist and president of the Democracy at Home Party (PPDA)
- Tudor Deliu, politician, professor, associate professor, lecturer and former president of the Liberal Democratic Party of Moldova (PLDM)
- Mircea Druc, Moldovan and Romanian politician, former Prime Minister of Moldova (1990–1991)
- Gheorghe Ghimpu, political prisoner in Soviet Union, one of the leaders who fought for the independence of the Republic of Moldova and reunification with Romania
- Mihai Ghimpu, former president of Liberal Party (PL), former interim President of Moldova (2009–2010)
- Ana Guțu, professor of philology, vicepresident of the National Unity Party (PUN)
- Ion Leașcenco, politician and civic activist, head of the National Unity Bloc (BUN)
- Ilie Ilașcu, Moldovan and Romanian politician, victim of the Transnistrian regime
- Valeriu Munteanu, president of Save Bessarabia Union (USB)
- Vitalia Pavlicenco, president of National Liberal Party (PNL)
- Alecu Reniță, president of Ecological Movement of Moldova
- John Onoje, Sierra Leonean-born Moldovan politician
- Maia Sandu, politician and economist, current President of Moldova (since 2020)
- Anatol Șalaru, general secretary and former president of National Unity Party (PUN), former Minister of Defence of Republic of Moldova and founder of the National Liberal Party (PNL)
- Octavian Țîcu, president of National Unity Party, historian and former professional boxer
- Anatol Ursu, politician and civic activist, member of Romanian Popular Party (PPR)
- Mihai Cimpoi, politician, cultural scientist, academician
- Veaceslav Untilă, politician, member of Liberal Party
- Nicolae Timofti, former president of Republic of Moldova
- Vlad Filat, politician and businessman, former prime minister of Moldova
- Ion Costaș, military general and politician
- Veaceslav Platon, politician
- Dinu Plîngău, politician, member of Dignity and Truth Platform Party
- Vlad Cubreacov, politician
- Alexandru Moșanu, politician, historian and academician, 1st president of the Moldovan Parliament
- Valentin Dolganiuc, politician, founder of Dignity and Truth Platform Party
- Ion Sturza, politician and businessman, former Prime Minister of Moldova
- Iurie Leancă, politician, former Prime Minister of Moldova, member of European People's Party of Moldova and of PRO Romania
- Anatol Petrencu, historian, politician
- Valeriu Muravschi, politician, former Prime Minister of Moldova
- Nicolae Andronic, politician
- Sergiu Mocanu, politician, president of the Anti-Mafia People's Movement (Romanian: Mișcarea Populară Antimafie)
- Valeriu Matei, politician, writer, academician
- Vasile Șoimaru, politician
- Nicolae Costin, politician, former mayor of Chișinău
- Ion Hadârcă, writer, translator and politician, founder of the Popular Front of Moldova, former member of Moldovan Parliament, former member of the Senate of Romania
- Ion Varta, historian and politician
- Valeriu Graur, political prisoner in the Soviet Union, one of the founders of the National Patriotic Front
- Alexandru Usatiuc-Bulgăr, political prisoner in the Soviet Union, one of the founders of the National Patriotic Front
- Alexandru Șoltoianu, political prisoner in the Soviet Union, one of the founders of the National Patriotic Front
- Călin Vieru, politician, physician, son of poet Grigore Vieru
- Ion Vatamanu, chemist, writer and politician
- Monica Babuc, politician, historian, former Minister of Education
- Ion Leucă, politician
- Ghenadie Buza, politician
- Oazu Nantoi, politician
- Ion Cebanu, politician, former Minister of Youth and Sports
- Gheorghe Brega, physician, politician, former Deputy Prime Minister for Social Affairs of Moldova
- Sergiu Burcă, journalist, politician
- Leonida Lari, poet, journalist, politician, former member of the Parliament of Romania (1992-2008) and of the Supreme Soviet of the Soviet Union (1989-1991)
- Mihai Coșcodan, scientist, politician
- Chiril Gaburici, politician, former Minister of Economy and former Prime Minister of Moldova
- Iacob Golovcă, civic activist, leader of the Anti-Molotov–Ribbentrop Pact Association
- Iurie Colesnic, technical literature corrector, former publishing director, literary historian, politician and writer
- Pavel Filip, engineer, politician, former Prime Minister of Moldova
- Alexandru Tănase, jurist, politician former president of the Constitutional Court of the Republic of Moldova, former Minister of Justice
- Oleg Bodrug, physicist, politician
- Vladimir Plahotniuc, oligarch, businessman, philanthropist, politician
- Andrian Candu, jurist, politician, former President of the Moldovan Parliament
- Tatiana Potîng, politician, former deputy prime minister of Moldova
- Vladimir Solonari, politician, historian
- Mihai Godea, historian, politician, former member of the Moldovan Parliament
- Sergiu Prodan, politician, film director, current Minister of culture
- Anatolie Dimitriu, president of Ialoveni district (since 2015)
- Nadejda Brânzan, physician, politician, former member of Moldovan Parliament
- Alexandru Arseni, politician, jurist, professor
- Igor Munteanu, politician and diplomat, former Moldovan Ambassador to the United States, Canada and Mexico, former member of the Moldovan Parliament
- Lilian Carp, politician and professor, member of the Moldovan Parliament
- Valeriu Ghilețchi, Baptist clergyman and politician, president of the European Christian Political Party
- Nicolae Mătcaș, linguist, writer, academic and politician, 1st Minister of Science and Education
- Gheorghe Ghidirim, physician, politician
- Fiodor Ghelici, politician, former presidential adviser to Igor Dodon, member of the Working People's Party
- Constantin Tampiza, economist, politician, 1st Minister of Finance and the 1st Minister of Economy of Moldova from 1990 to 1992
- Anatol Țăranu, historian, politician, former deputy
- Mihai Severovan, politician, former minister
- Gheorghe Briceag, former political prisoner in the Soviet Union
- Tudor Panțîru, former President of the Constitutional Court of Moldova
- Igor Șarov, historian, former Minister of Education
- Gheorghe Duca, former President of the Academy of Sciences of Moldova

==== Artists ====
- Grigore Vieru, poet and writer
- Eugen Doga, composer
- Nicu Țărnă, musician, actor, songwriter, showman, and TV presenter
- Nicolae Dabija, writer and academician
- Ion Ungureanu, actor, former member of the Popular Front of Moldova, 1st Moldovan minister of Culture and Cults
- Vladimir Beșleagă, writer
- Aurelian Silvestru, writer and activist
- Dumitru Matcovschi, writer and poet
- Leo Butnaru, writer and poet
- Valentin Mândâcanu, writer, founding member of the Popular Front of Moldova
- Doina and Ion Aldea Teodorovici, musical duo
- Andrei Țurcanu, writer
- Nicolai Costenco, writer and poet
- Gheorghe Vodă, poet and film director
- Serafim Saka, writer
- Nicolae Botgros, violinist, conductor
- Ion Suruceanu, singer
- Ion Ciocanu, literary critic
- Iulian Filip, writer
- Valentina Rusu-Ciobanu, painter
- Mihai Volontir, actor
- Emil Loteanu, film director, actor and writer
- Efim Tarlapan, writer
- Silviu Berejan, linguist, writer, academician
- Zdob și Zdub, rock band
- Ion Moraru, activist and author, founder of the anti-Soviet group Sabia Dreptății and a political prisoner in the Soviet Union
- Victor Buruiană, musician, composer, guitarist
- Gheorghe Urschi, actor, director, humorist
- Aureliu Busuioc, writer, journalist and poet
- Gheorghe Erizanu, writer
- Ricky Ardezianu, singer
- Spiridon Vangheli, writer
- Vladimir Lorcenkov, writer and journalist of Russian ethnicity
- Tudor Tătaru, actor and humorist
- Irina Rimes, singer
- Nicolae Sulac, folk musician
- Igor Cobileanski, actor and film director

==== Others ====
- Petru Bogatu, journalist
- Nicolae Lupan, journalist, former member of the National Patriotic Front
- Anatol Vidrașcu, editor
- Peter Păduraru, Metropolitan of Bessarabia
- Ion Ciuntu, priest
- Oleg Brega, journalist, activist, filmmaker, member of Democracy at Home Party and of the Green Party
- Petru Soltan, mathematician, member of the Academy of Sciences of Moldova and an honorary member of the Romanian Academy
- Ion Țurcanu, historian
- Gheorghe E. Cojocaru, historian
- Eugenio Coșeriu, linguist
- Petru Buburuz, Orthodox priest and journalist

=== Romania ===
==== Political parties ====
- Alliance for the Union of Romanians (AUR)
- People's Movement Party (PMP)
- United Romania Party (PRU)
- Greater Romania Party (PRM)
- Noua Dreaptă (ND)
- Romanian Nationhood Party (NR)
- The Right Alternative (ADR)

==== Political figures ====
- Traian Băsescu, President of Romania (2004–2014)
- Florin Călinescu, politician, actor, theatre director and television host, President of the Green Party
- Mihai Chirica, politician, Mayor of Iași
- Dacian Cioloș, Prime Minister of Romania (2015–2017), ex-president of the Save Romania Union, leader of Renew Europe
- Nicușor Dan, president of Romania (since 2025), civic activist, mathematician, politician, and former party leader of Save Romania Union (USR)
- Liviu Dragnea, politician, former president of the Social Democratic Party (PSD), President of the Chamber of Deputies (2016–2019)
- Daniel Gheorghe, politician and historian, MP, member of Romanian National Liberal Party (PNL)
- Ramona Mănescu, National Liberal MEP (2007–2013), Romanian Transport Minister (2013–2014) and Foreign Affairs Minister (July–November 2019)
- Mihail Neamțu, philosopher, theologian and writer, founder of New Republic political party
- Norica Nicolai, MEP (2009–2019)
- Ludovic Orban, politician, former president of the Romanian National Liberal Party (PNL) (2017-2021), former prime minister of Romania (2019–2020)
- Theodor Paleologu, historian, diplomat and politician, Minister of Culture of Romania (2008–2009), formerly a member of the National Liberal Party (PNL), the People's Movement Party (PMP), and the Democratic Liberal Party (PDL)
- Varujan Pambuccian, politician, informatician, and mathematician, MP on behalf of the Armenian minority
- Victor Ponta, jurist and politician, Prime Minister of Romania (2012–2015), former president of the Social Democratic Party (PSD), President of PRO Romania
- Călin Popescu-Tăriceanu, politician, Prime Minister of Romania (2004–2008), President of the Alliance of Liberals and Democrats (ALDE)
- George Simion, politician, writer and civic activist; president of the Alliance for the Union of Romanians (AUR)
- Eugen Tomac, politician, historian and journalist, President of the People's Movement Party (PMP)
- Varujan Vosganian, economist, politician, writer, Romanian Minister of Economy and Commerce (2006–2008), and Minister of Economy and Finance (2007–2008)
- Dan Barna, politician, former president of the Save Romania Union
- Corneliu Coposu, politician, political detainee during the communist regime
- Klaus Iohannis, president of Romania (2014–2025)
- Theodor Stolojan, politician, former prime minister of Romania
- Mircea Diaconu, actor and politician, former member of the European Parliament
- Dan Diaconescu, politician and journalist, former president of People's Party - Dan Diaconescu
- Corneliu Vadim Tudor, politician
- Teodor Meleșcanu, politician, diplomat
- Adrian Papahagi, philologist, politician, founding member of The Right Alternative
- Rareș Bogdan, politician, journalist, MEP (since 2019)
- Adrian Năstase, diplomat, politician, jurist, former Prime Minister of Romania
- Ion Coja, philologist, politician
- George Pruteanu, literary critic and politician
- Mircea Chelaru, general, historian, essaist politician, former Chief of the Romanian General Staff
- Ninel Peia, politician, leader of the Romanian Nationhood Party
- Ion Rațiu, lawyer, diplomat, journalist, businessman, writer, and politician
- Victor Ciorbea, lawyer, politician, former Prime Minister of Romania
- Radu Vasile, historian, politician, former Prime Minister of Romania
- Nicolae Văcăroiu, economist, politician, former Prime Minister of Romania
- Claudiu Târziu, politician, journalist, former co-president of the Alliance for the Union of Romanians (AUR)
- Emil Boc, current mayor of Cluj-Napoca, former Prime Minister of Romania
- Gheorghe Buzatu, historian, politician
- Cristian Diaconescu, jurist, politician, diplomat, leader of People's Movement Party (since 2021)
- Crin Antonescu, historian, politician, former President of the Senate of Romania
- Alexandru Mironov, science-fiction writer, journalist, politician, former Minister of Youth and Sport
- Marcel Ciolacu, politician, President of the Social Democratic Party (PSD) and current President of the Chamber of Deputies of Romania (since 2021)
- Marian Munteanu, politician
- Vasile Dîncu, former Deputy Prime Minister of Romania
- Mihai Șora, philosopher, essayist, politician, former Minister of Education
- Diana Iovanovici Șoșoacă, lawyer, politician
- Titus Corlățean, jurist, diplomat, politician, former Minister of Foreign Affairs
- Anton Crihan, politician, lawyer, economist, former member of Sfatul Țării, former member of the Parliament of Romania
- Gheorghe Funar, economist, politician, former mayor of Cluj-Napoca
- Cozmin Gușă, physicist, journalist, politician
- Ion Gheorghe Maurer, lawyer, diplomat and communist politician, former Prime Minister of Romania (1961-1974) and former President of the Presidium of the Great National Assembly (1958-1961)
- Monica Macovei, lawyer, prosecutor, politician, former Minister of Justice (2004-2007), former Member of the European Parliament (2009-2019)
- Emil Străinu, army general, politician, writer, journalist, ufologist, former president of Greater Romania Party
- Dragoș Tudorache, MEP
- Eugen Teodorovici, economist and politician, former Finance Minister of Romania
- Ilie Năstase, former world No. 1 tennis player and former Senator of Romania

==== Artists ====
- Alexandru Arșinel, actor
- Claudiu Bleonț, actor
- Cheloo, Romanian rapper, member of Paraziții rap group.
- Tudor Chirilă, actor, musician, composer, and producer
- Tudor Gheorghe, singer, songwriter, and actor
- Ovidiu Lipan, musician, composer, and drummer
- Maia Morgenstern, actress
- Florin Piersic, actor
- Stela Popescu, actress
- Rudy Rosenfeld, Romanian actor of Jewish descent, born in Chernivtsi (today in Ukraine)
- Adrian Păunescu, poet
- Fuego, musician
- Paul Goma, writer, anticommunist dissident
- Gheorghe Zamfir, Romanian nai musician
- Grigore Leșe, musician
- Anastasia Lazariuc, musician
- Nicolae Covaci, rock musician, founder and leader of Transsylvania Phoenix
- Vasile Șeicaru, musician
- Ștefan Hrușcă, musician
- Nicu Alifantis, musician
- Emil Brumaru, writer, poet, physician
- Ion Caramitru, actor, politician, former Minister of Culture
- Sofia Vicoveanca, singer
- Dan Bittman, rock musician, lead singer of Holograf
- Dan Puric, actor, director, and pantomime artist
- Marius Moga, composer, producer, singer
- Radu Theodoru, writer, historian, military officer, former member of Greater Romania Party
- Daniel Ioniță, poet and translator
- Fără Zahăr, folk rock band
- Ovidiu Creangă, writer

==== Sportspeople ====
- Mihai Leu, rally driver and retired boxer
- Ruxandra Dragomir, tennis player
- Andreea Răducan, Olympic gymnast
- Camelia Potec, Olympic swimmer
- Petru Toarcă, wrestler, born in Babele, Budjak, Ukraine
- Cătălin Moroșanu, kickboxer

==== Others ====
- Cristian Tudor Popescu, journalist
- Patriarch Daniel of Romania, Patriarch of the Romanian Orthodox Church
- Neagu Djuvara, (1916–2018), historian, essayist, philosopher, journalist, novelist, and diplomat
- Michael I of Romania, (1921–2017), the last King of Romania
- Adrian Cioroianu, historian, former Minister of Foreign Affairs
- Dan Dungaciu, sociologist
- Ioan-Aurel Pop, historian, President of the Romanian Academy (since 2018)
- Margareta of Romania, head of House of Romania
- Ion Cristoiu, journalist
- Iosif Constantin Drăgan, businessman, billionaire, writer, historian, Dacianist, former member of the Iron Guard
- Călin Georgescu, far-right politician, conspiracy theorist, senior expert in sustainable development, former president of Club of Rome
- Constantin Bălăceanu-Stolnici, neurologist, member of the Romanian Academy
- Gleb Drăgan, academician, engineer, member of the Romanian Academy
- Doru Braia, journalist
- Mircea Badea, journalist, political satirist, television host, media critic, radio personality

== Opponents of unification ==
=== Republic of Moldova ===
==== Political figures ====
- Nicu Popescu, former minister of foreign affairs
- Igor Dodon, former president of Moldova
- Vladimir Voronin, former president of Moldova
- Renato Usatîi, former mayor of Bălți
- Ilan Șor, former mayor of Orhei
- Zinaida Greceanîi
- Vadim Krasnoselsky, President of Transnistria
- Mihail Garbuz, politician, president of Moldovan Patriots Party
- Victor Șelin, president of Social Democratic Party of Moldova
- Vasile Tarlev, former prime-minister of Moldova
- Vadim Mișin, founder of Revival Party
- Valerii Klimenko, founder and former president of Ravnopravie Movement
- Aleksandr Petkov
- Mark Tkaciuk
- Grigore Petrenco, one of the leaders of the Moldovan Antifa Movement
- Vlad Batrîncea, secretary of Party of Socialists of the Republic of Moldova
- Alexandru Slusari
- Iurie Muntean, politician, leader of the Collective Action Party - Civic Congress
- Bogdan Țîrdea
- Marian Lupu, former President of the Moldovan Parliament, former acting President of Moldova, chairman of Court of Accounts of Moldova
- Nicolae Pascaru`
- Vasile Stati, historian, politician
- Irina Vlah, politician, current Governor of Găgăuzia
- Mihail Formuzal, politician, former Governor of Găgăuzia
- Vladimir Țurcan, politician
- Vladimir Cîssa, politician, current president of Halk Topluşu
- Dumitru Croitor, politician, former Governor of Gagauzia
- Nicolai Dudoglo, former Mayor of Comrat
- Dmitri Constantinov, former president of Halk Topluşu
- Corneliu Dudnic, politician
- Iosif Belous, Holocaust survivor, President of the Association of Former Prisoners of Ghettos and Concentration Camps of Moldova
- Corneliu Popovici, politician, former Minister of Education
- Victoria Furtună, president of the Greater Moldova Party
- Valeriu Senic, former MP and former president of the Socialist Party of Moldova
- Natalia Morari, journalist and political figure

=== Artists ===
- Boris Marian, writer and former Soviet dissident
- Gherasim Ghidirim, writer and former intelligence officer

==== Political parties and organizations ====
- Electoral Bloc of Communists and Socialists:
  - Party of Communists of the Republic of Moldova
  - Party of Socialists of the Republic of Moldova
- Renato Usatîi Electoral Bloc:
  - Our Party
  - Motherland Party
- Revival Party
- Party of Regions of Moldova
- Ours Party

=== Others ===
- Marchel Mihăescu, bishop of Bălți and Fălești

== See also ==
- 2018 unification declarations in Moldova and Romania
- Bessarabian question
- Controversy over ethnic and linguistic identity in Moldova
- Moldova–Romania relations
- German reunification
- Reintegration of Transnistria into Moldova
- Greater Moldova
- Greater Romania
- "Bessarabia, Romanian land"
- Union of Bessarabia with Romania
- Korean reunification

== Sources ==
- Lenore A. Grenoble (2003) Language Policy in the Soviet Union, Springer, ISBN 1-4020-1298-5
- John Mackinlay, Peter Cross (2003) Regional Peacekeepers United Nations University Press ISBN 92-808-1079-0
- Charles King, "Moldovan Identity and the Politics of Pan-Romanianism", in Slavic Review, Vol. 53, No. 2. (Summer 1994), pp. 345–368.
- Charles King, The Moldovans: Romania, Russia, and the politics of culture, Hoover Institution Press, Stanford University, 2000. ISBN 0-8179-9792-X
