= John Onoje =

Moldovan activist (1959–2024)

- Born: 15 April 1959; Sierra Leone Colony and Protectorate (today in Sierra Leone)
- Died: 14 February 2024 (aged 64); Brussels, Belgium
- Citizenship: Republic of Moldova
- Education: Anambra state University of Science and Technology, Enugu, Nigeria; University of Nigeria, Nsukka
- Political party: National Liberal Party (PNL)
- Movement: Unification of Moldova and Romania; Moldovan integration in the European Union

John Onoje (15 April 1959 – 14 February 2024) was a Sierra Leonean-born activist from Chișinău, the Republic of Moldova. He was a notable activist and member of the National Liberal Party (PNL). Onoje was a self-declared member of the Hyde Park public activism group presided by Oleg Brega. In 2011, he signed up to run for President in the Moldovan presidential election. Onoje's activity has been so well publicised that a party leader, Victor Șelin, proposed the withdrawal of his Moldovan citizenship on this basis.

== Early life and immigration to Moldova ==
Onoje was a naturalised Moldovan citizen with a Sierra-Leonean background; he came to Moldova from Sierra Leone in 1999, to escape the civil war in his home country. In 2001, the UN Refugee Agency granted him the statute of refugee. While fighting to become a fully-fledged Moldovan, Onoje learnt the language and became a well-known face at the Chișinău open market, where he was selling newspapers. After living as a refugee for over a decade, he was granted Moldovan citizenship on 17 January 2011.

== Political career ==
On 9 December 2011, Onoje passed the medical examination to run in the Moldovan presidential election, 2011–2012. On 10 December 2011, he came at the Stephen the Great Monument to announce that he needs 15 signatures to run the 16 December elections. In December 2011, Victor Șelin proposed the withdrawal of his Moldovan citizenship. He was the owner of a company registered in Moldova, which sells newspapers.

Onoje has been a member of the National Liberal Party since 20 December 2011. On 21 November 2011, he protested in front of the Ministry of the Foreign Affairs and European Integration of Moldova in the eve of the visit of Sergey Lavrov to Chișinău. On 2 January 2012, Onoje protested in front of the Russian Embassy in Chișinău against the death of Vadim Pisari, denouncing the lack of an official statement from the Moldovan government on Vadim Pisari's case. One day later, he joined another demonstration.

According to Amnesty International, Onoje was a victim of racism. On 20 January 2012, they reported that Vladimir Voronin, the head of the Party of Communists made racist statements addressed to Onoje. Two days earlier, he had participated in the meeting of a group near the Triumphal Arch, Chișinău, while Voronin was addressing his supporters in the National Assembly Square. Voronin, the former President of the country said:

“They [the ruling parties] brought here a Negro, who'd just climbed down from a tree, and now he's doing politics for them."

On 19 January 2012, Amnesty International also reported that Onoje was beaten up in a toilet in an underpass in Chișinău near a shopping centre in broad daylight.

== Later life and death ==
In 2018, Onoje emigrated to Belgium, obtaining refugee status, where he worked as a cook.

Onoje died on 14 February 2024, in Brussels.
