= Ion Mușuc =

Moldovan politician (born 1951)

Ion Muşuc

Personal details
- Born: 31 May 1951 (age 74) Bilicenii Noi, Sîngerei District
- Party: Social Democratic Party
- Children: Eduard Mușuc (born Bălţi, 25 september 1975)
- Profession: Economist

Ion Muşuc (born 31 May 1951) is a Moldovan politician.

== Biography ==
Ion Muşuc was born on 31 May 1951, in Bilicenii Noi, Sîngerei District. He is the former leader of the Social Democratic Party of Moldova.

In September 2006, Ion Muşuc and his son, Eduard, were accused of fraudulently churning collateral to the tune of 2 million Moldovan lei ($155,836). At that time, the elder Muşuc was the head of the opposition Social Democratic Party and Eduard Muşuc was a member of its leadership and the former director of the successful Internet provider Megadat. Ion Muşuc fled Moldova when the case was made public, while his son was arrested on charges punishable by 10 to 25 years in prison. Bail was set and rescinded several times until in April 2007, the court dismissed the accusation for lack of a substantive basis. Muşuc took his case to the European Court of Human Rights, and in November 2007 was awarded 12,000 euros ($17,590) for moral suffering and legal fees in connection with what the court termed his "illegal detention."

Currently, his party has no seats in the Parliament of the Republic of Moldova.
