= 2011–2012 Moldovan presidential election =

- 2 December 2011; 11 January 2012; 16 March 2012
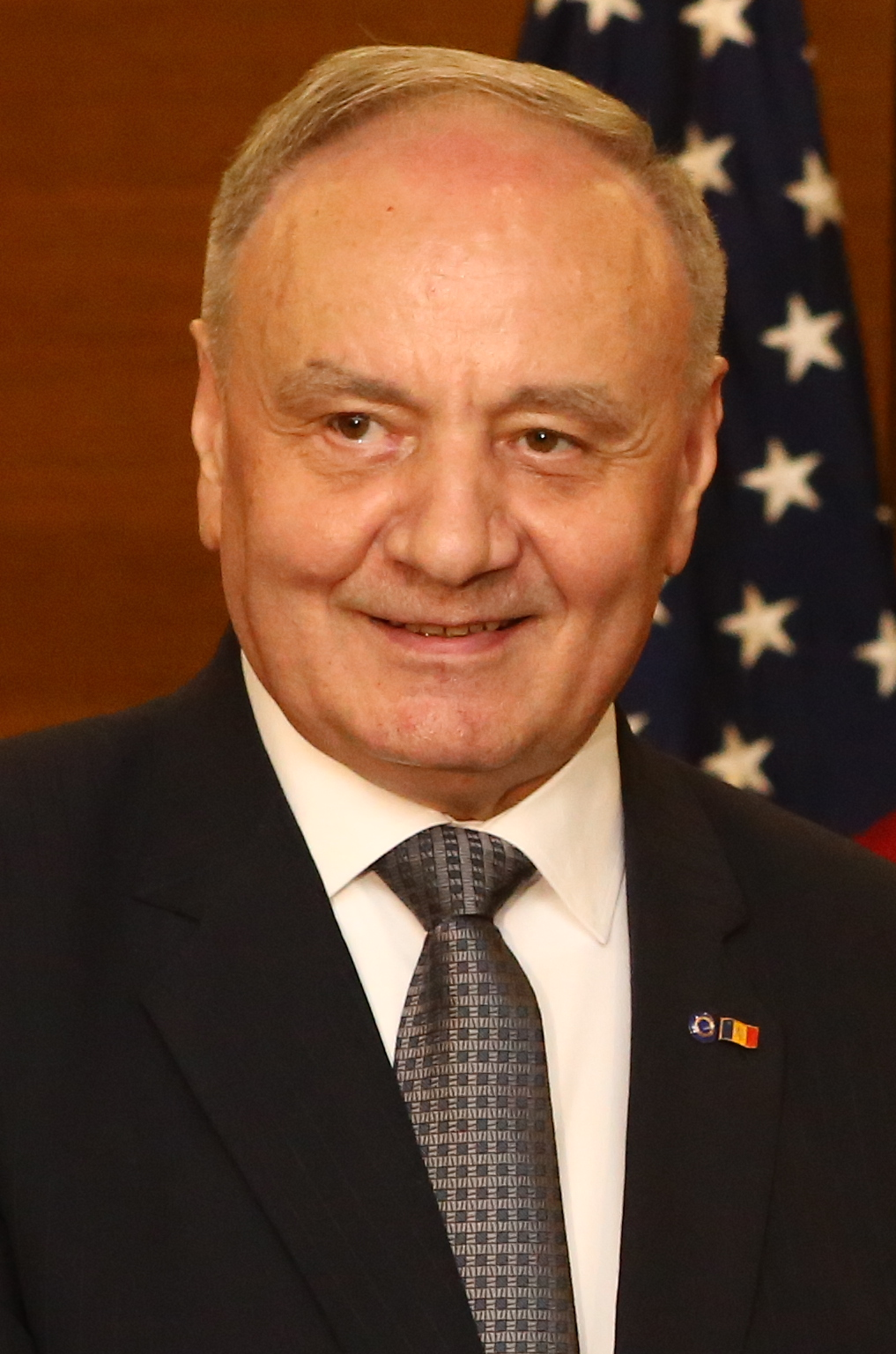
Nominee	Nicolae Timofti
Party	Independent
Electoral vote	62
Percentage	61.4%
President before election
Marian Lupu
(acting)
PDM
Elected President
Nicolae Timofti
Independent

Presidential elections were held in Moldova on 16 December 2011. The president was elected by the parliament in an indirect election, the final such election before the Constitutional Court restored the previous system of direct election by Moldovan citizens. After the election on 16 December failed, a second attempt was made on 15 January 2012. However, that vote was annulled as being unconstitutional since it had not been held in a secret vote. On 16 March, parliament elected Nicolae Timofti as president by 62 votes out of 101, with the PCRM boycotting the election, putting an end to a political crisis that had lasted since April 2009.

== Background ==
After the parliamentary election held on 5 April 2009, the PCRM won 49.48% of the vote and 60 seats, one seat too few to elect a president. Vladimir Voronin, up to then president, was elected Speaker of Parliament and also retained the presidency with an interim status. Protests and riots by opposition activists amidst civil unrest followed in April 2009. PCRM were then unable to secure one additional vote during the May–June 2009 presidential election out of the 41 MPs from the three opposition parties; a snap parliamentary election was necessary. The parliamentary election of July 2009 led to the PCRM losing further seats to a coalition of opposition parties which gained 53 seats. However, the opposition also failed to obtain enough seats to elect a president, thereby producing more uncertainty. Voronin announced on 2 September that he intended to resign, saying that his position as acting president had become "ambiguous and doubtful." He resigned on 11 September, sending a letter to the parliamentary secretariat.

By a vote of 52 MPs, the post of the President of the Republic of Moldova was declared vacant. Therefore, in accordance with Article 91 of the constitution, which provides that "the responsibility of the office shall devolve ad interim to the President of Parliament or the Prime Minister, in that order of priority," Mihai Ghimpu became the interim president of the Republic of Moldova.

The Constitutional Court of Moldova confirmed earlier on 17 September, the legitimacy of Mihai Ghimpu's position as Acting President of Moldova, which gave him the right to nominate a prime minister. On the same day, Ghimpu signed a decree nominating Vlad Filat for the office of prime minister.

The Commission for constitutional reform in Moldova was set up under presidential decree on 1 December in order to resolve the constitutional crisis. The post of Acting President passed later to Marian Lupu, who held it since 30 December 2010.

== Calendarisation ==
Following an interrogation submitted by four deputies of the PCRM, Moldova's Constitutional Court ruled on 8 February 2011 that the parliament is the only institution which can decide when to hold a new presidential election, since the two-month deadline after the end of the mandate of the previous president, as foreseen by the constitution as having expired.

On 20 October 2011 the Moldovan parliament decided to hold a presidential election on 18 November 2011.

== Candidatures ==
On 4 November 2011, Igor Dodon announced that he would quit the Party of Communists along with MPs Zinaida Greceanii and Veronica Abramciuc. Dodon said that the three of them would vote for a president who was independent from any party, alliance or other political body. They did so due to the PCRM's to boycott the election, thus making it virtually possible to break the impasse by reaching an agreement with the majority coalition that lacks two votes to pass the election threshold.

Nevertheless, on 15 November the deadline for candidates' applications expired with no applications provided. The country's laws do not make provision for a situation where there are no presidential candidates, but the elections are likely to be postponed or cancelled. Under Moldovan law, the presidential election can be repeated only once. If the second attempt fails, the country must hold early parliamentary elections.

Following two failed rounds to elect a president, the AEI had two candidates: Veronica Bacalu, the former deputy governor of the National Bank of Moldova, who was working at the World Bank and was nominated by the Liberal Democrat Party; and Ion Ababii, the former Minister of Health who was nominated by the Democratic Party. In the end, the head of the Supreme Magistrate Council Judge Nicolae Timofti became the compromise candidate. He said that he would maintain "strategic ties" with the United States, Russia and Germany, as well as worth towards settling the dispute of Transnistria; and he added that "Moldova must become a bridge between East and West from which it can only win."

== Election ==
Following successive failures to elect a president, the country had an acting president for over 900 days. A 60% vote was required to approve a president.

According to Article 80 of the constitution: "The President of Moldova takes office on the oath-taking day and his term has a duration of 4 years."

=== First attempt ===
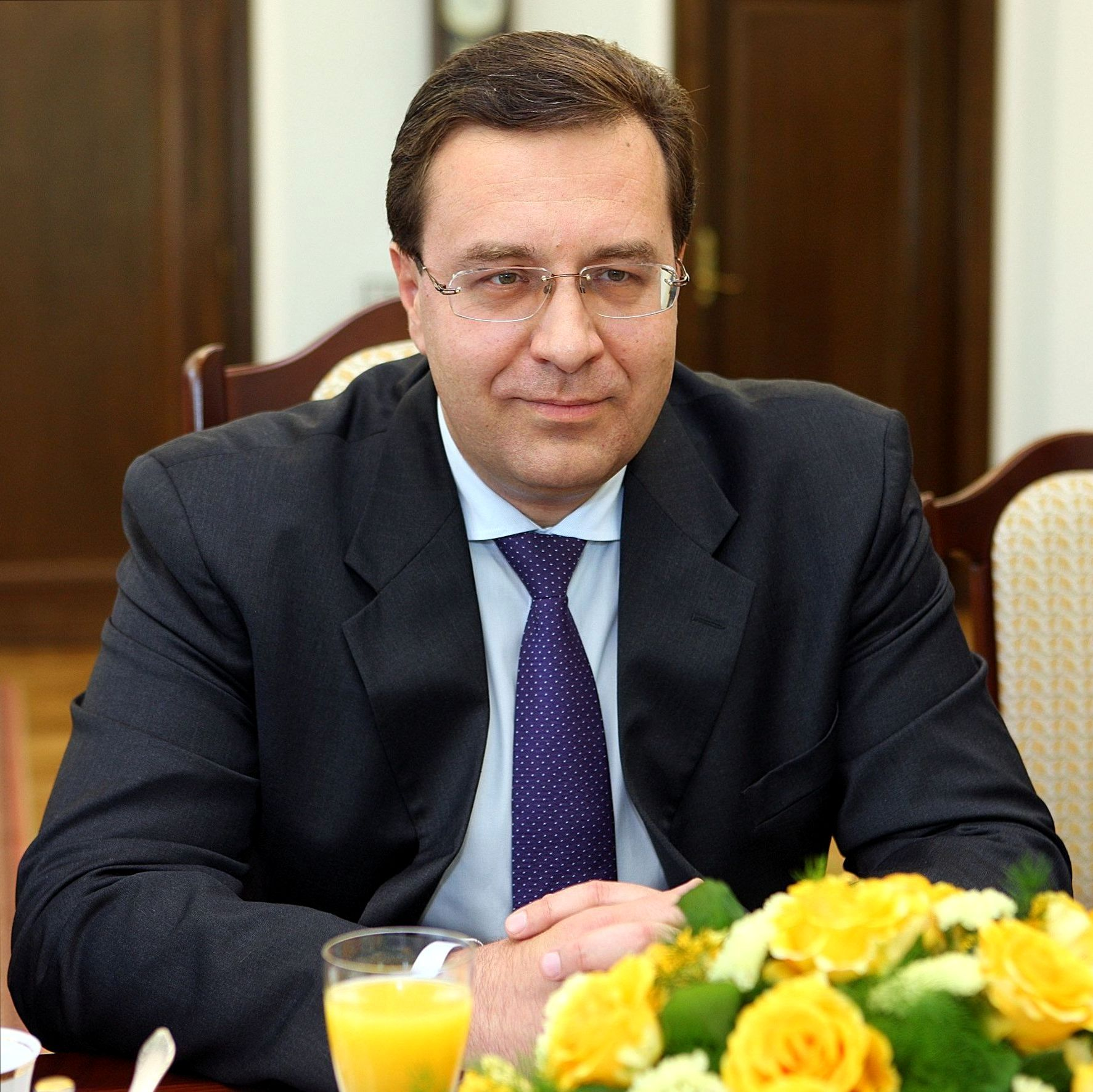
Marian Lupu

On 2 December, an attempt was set for 16 December to try to get candidates for the election. At the same time, an electoral law revision was passed that asserted an election will only be held if there are any candidates and only if at least 61 MPs are present at the vote. Should the election again be unsuccessful, an early parliamentary election would have to be held (which would be the third such election after 2009 and 2010).

The three PCRM MPs who defected attended the vote (with the other PCRM MPs boycotting again), but voted against Marian Lupu, who was the only candidate. Another attempt was set for 15 January 2012. However, Lupu announced he would not run in the election, and stated that the governing parties were prepared to nominate a compromise candidate.

=== Second attempt ===
In December 2011, the Sierra Leone-born John Onoje signed up to run for president. On 9 December, Onoje passed the medical examination in order to run for president. Onoje's campaign was so well publicised that the PSRM's Victor Șelin proposed revoking his Moldovan citizenship on this basis.

On 11 January, Oazu Nantoi told the press that he would run as a candidate and that he had discussed this prospect with Vlad Filat and other leaders of the Alliance for European Integration: "Their reaction was moderately positive. I remain an optimist and I hope that I will secure the parliamentary deputies' support and go ahead with my self-nomination." The same day, the PCRM had proposed the former chairman of the National Bank of Moldova Leonid Tălmaci as a compromise candidate. The two candidates then registered with the head of the election commission to run for the post of president.

On 12 January, the Constitutional Court of Moldova annulled the inconclusive December election because some members of parliament violated the law by showing how they marked their ballots on television.

==== Aftermath ====
A new constitutional referendum was announced to be planned for April, with the presidential election to be held afterwards. On 15 January, the leaders of AEI made a joint statement announcing that a constitutional referendum would be held in April. Prime Minister Vlad Filat said that "a referendum on the amendment of the constitution will be initiated in order to give people the opportunity to rectify the constitutional deficiencies that have been triggering endless political crises." Acting President Marian Lupu added that: "Moldova's president will be elected within a month after the validation of the referendum's outcome." Liberal leader Mihai Ghimpu then said that the amendment to the constitution is the only solution to the political crisis. The leaders of AEI then withdrew their proposal for the referendum during a special address on Moldova 1 on 10 February. It added that a date for a new presidential vote would be announced on 16 February at the opening of the parliamentary session.

=== Third attempt ===
On 13 March, Nicolae Timofti and MP Mihai Godea, the leader of the Democratic Action Party talked about the expected election and what would make Godea agree to vote for him. Two days later Godea announced his support for Timofti. At the end of a meeting with Timofti on 14 March, Igor Dodon had not decided whether to back him.

Following meetings between the Alliance for European Integration and the Party of Socialists of the Republic of Moldova, another election attempt was set for 16 March after parliament affirmed the date 9 days earlier, though PCRM boycotted the vote on the premise that the incumbent parliament is illegitimate, amidst their demand it be dissolved. Three PCRM rebels, who called themselves "socialists," and led by Igor Dodon suggested they would back Timofti. Dodon said: "The election of a president is better than an aggressive campaign for new parliamentary elections which will not solve the political crisis. We must put an end to the crisis and get down to work for the good of the country. That is how an opposition should act and not choose to stage marches and street demonstrations." Timofti said: "The European orientation of Moldova must be a priority. This has been the policy of Moldova in recent years and this is the policy that must continue" and that "I am convinced that Moldova has no other future than a European future." The vote was brought forward from the afternoon to the morning. PCRM also threatened to disrupt the vote. PCRM supporters protested the election, but former president Vladimir Voronin later said that the party had called for a suspension to the protests.

==== Final result ====
Timofti was elected with the support of AEI, three former PCRM deputies who had defected to PSRM and Mihai Godea. The head of the election commission, Tudor Deliu, announced the result saying that "after 917 days, the epic of electing a president is over." Addressing reporters after the Constitutional Court of Moldova confirmed him as head of state on 19 March, Timofti said that his inauguration would likely take place on 23 March. According to article 79 of the constitution, he must be sworn in as president within 45 days.

Summary of the Moldovan presidential election result
Candidate	Party	Votes
Nicolae Timofti	Independent	62
Totals		101
Source: Moldova.org

== Reactions ==
=== Domestic ===
Upon being elected, Timofti called for the removal of all Russian peacekeeping troops from Transnistria and said that he advocates a peaceful solution to the Transnistria conflict through negotiations with the 5+2 format (Russia, Ukraine, the Organization for Security and Cooperation in Europe, the European Union and the U.S. He also called for reforms and upholding the "rule of law" adding that in his role as president and thus "guarantor of the constitution" he would "supervise how the principle of separation of powers in the state is observed as this is a fundamental, democratic principle without which we cannot speak about veritable rule of law. They now speak a lot about the imperfection of the constitution and the necessity of amending it...I will provide all the support for improving the constitutional framework so that there are no blockages in the future and the supreme law ensures the efficient and harmonious development of the country." He was also congratulated by parliament.

The AEI also expressed regret over the PCRM's boycott with PM Vlad Filat saying the coalition has sought to "establish a civilised dialogue with the opposition Communists, but they refused to contribute to the efforts of the government. I wish I would have had half of the possibilities that the opposition has now, when I was in opposition. Once the president is elected, the political establishment will have to cope with the hardest burden – we should have a united society at the next parliamentary election, without the barricades that the Communists have built now." However, PCRM MP Sergiu Sîrbu said the boycott will continue and that "something serious should happen for us to return to parliament, like the resignation of the president or of the government." He also added that a new law that would suspend salaries to those MPs who are absent from sittings of parliament or of parliamentary commissions without reason would not deter the boycott as "it will be a serious blow, but democracy and the fight for justice [would continue]."

=== International ===
- European Union – The President of the European Commission José Manuel Barroso also congratulated Timofti on behalf of the EC. President of the European Parliament Martin Schulz congratulated Timofti saying he was "happy that the Moldovan people finally have a president after a two-and-a-half-year long institutional stalemate." The European Parliament's permanent rapporteur on Moldova Sir Graham Watson commented: "The Moldovan Parliament and the new President-elect Nicolae Timofti both deserve our congratulations. A three-year political deadlock has finally been resolved. I welcome the emphasis that President Timofti has already put on European integration."
- Council of Europe – Secretary General Thorbjørn Jagland also congratulated Timofti. President of the Parliamentary Assembly Jean-Claude Mignon issued a statement that read: "I am convinced... all the political parties will show responsibility by accepting the democratic legitimacy of the country’s institutions and hence the legitimacy of a president elected in accordance with its constitutional requirements."
- Georgia – President Mikheil Saakashvili said the election was seen "as a victory for democracy and European values in Moldova."
- Hungary – Prime Minister Viktor Orbán congratulated Timofti over a phone call on 16 March.
- Lithuania – President Dalia Grybauskaitė send a message to Timofti that read: "I would like to assure you that Lithuania remains fully committed to your country's endeavors towards integration into Europe."
- North Korea – Rodong Sinmun reported on 30 March, "Kim Yong Nam, president of the Presidium of the DPRK Supreme People's Assembly, sent a congratulatory message on 27 March to Nikolai Timofti on his election as president of the Moldovan Republic. Kim in the message wished the president success in his work for the prosperity of his country, expressing belief that the bilateral relations would develop favorably".
- Romania – President Traian Băsescu congratulated Timofti over a phone call on 16 March. The president then congratulated the Chişinău political class for reaching an agreement on the matter. Băsescu also assured Timofti of his full support for continuing the country's internal reform processes and closeness to the EU and invited Timofti to visit Romania.
- Russia – Members of the lower house of parliament, the State Duma, welcomed the election of the president on 16 March. The chairman committee on CIS affairs and relations with compatriots, Leonid Slutsky, said that "Moldova today has finally officially ended a long-term government crisis. Moldova is the world’s only republic which has lived so long without a president."
- Ukraine – President Viktor Yanukovych congratulated Timofti during a phone conversation on 16 March and also invited Timofti to visit Ukraine.
