= Bilicenii =

Bilicenii may refer to one of two communes in Sîngerei District, Moldova:

- Bilicenii Noi
- Bilicenii Vechi
