= Sergiu Coropceanu =

Moldovan politician

Sergiu Coropceanu (born January 8, 1975) is a Moldovan politician. In 2011, he was elected general secretary of the Social Democratic Party of Moldova.

== Biography ==
Sergiu Coropceanu was born on January 8, 1975, in the village of Ustia, Moldavian SSR, Soviet Union.

In 1997, he graduated from the Academy of Economic Studies of Moldova, faculty "International Economic Relations". During the year 2000, followed training courses organized by the Cooperation Committee in the Technical Assistance Program of the Government of Japan and the New Independent States in the field of small and medium enterprises management. Then, during 2002–2003, he studied at the European Institute for Political Studies, the Council of Europe in Strasbourg.

His professional career started in 1997 as an assistant lecturer at the Academy of Economic Studies and as a professor at the Republican College of Informatics and Law, while working at the State Tax Inspectorate of Chișinău. Subsequently, since 2001, carries out the entrepreneurial activity and also represents the interests of small and medium-sized businesses in several working groups in the country and within the United Nations Economic Commission for Europe.

Besides the activities in the economic and political field, he has a passion in the field of sports being multiple national and international karate champion, black belt "4 Dan", holding the position of coach and president of the Karate Shotokan Federation of Moldova for several years, director for Republic of Moldova and East European countries from the International Federation.

== Political activity ==
On April 17, 2010, he was elected as Secretary General of the Social Democratic Party. He is part of the new leadership team headed by Victor Șelin. He was the candidate of his party for the post of mayor of Chișinău at the first round of the local elections on June 5, 2011, where he obtained 0.39% of the votes.
