= Unionist Movement =

Unionist Movement may refer to:

- United Ulster Unionist Movement
- Unionist Movement of the Republic of Moldova (MURM or Romanian: Mişcarea Unionistă din Republica Moldova)
- Italian Unionist Movement, party active just after the end of World War II
- Unionist Movement (Colombia)

== See also ==
- unification movement
