= Partidul Social Democrat =

Partidul Social Democrat may refer to:

- Social Democratic Party (Moldova)
- Social Democratic Party (Romania)
