= Boris Volosatîi =

Moldovan professor and Romanian deputy

Member of the Chamber of Deputies of Romania
- Incumbent
- Assumed office 21 December 2020
- Constituency: Romanian diaspora

President of the Alliance for the Union of Romanians^{[a]}
- Incumbent
- Assumed office 10 September 2022
- Preceded by: Vlad Bilețchi

Personal details
- Born: 16 June 1956 (age 69) Purcari, Moldavian SSR, Soviet Union (now Moldova)
- Party: Alliance for the Union of Romanians
- Other political affiliations: Liberal Democratic Party of Moldova
- Occupation: Professor, politician
- a. of the Moldovan branch of the party

Boris Volosatîi (also Volosatâi; born 16 June 1956) is a Moldovan professor and member of the Parliament of Romania. A history professor, Volosatîi was the director of the Gheorghe Asachi Romanian-French High School for over three decades and an advocate for the unification of Moldova and Romania. Volosatîi became a member of the Chamber of Deputies of Romania of the Alliance for the Union of Romanians (AUR) for the constituency of the Romanian diaspora in 2020, being the only Moldovan in the 2020–2024 legislature of the Romanian Parliament. He is since 2022 the president of the Moldovan branch of AUR.

== Biography ==
Boris Volosatîi was born on 16 June 1956 in Purcari, in the Moldavian SSR, Soviet Union (now Moldova). He is a history professor with the degree of Doctor of Science. He was the director of the Gheorghe Asachi Romanian-French High School in Chișinău from 5 January 1990 to 1 January 2021, having been among the longest-serving heads of a Moldovan educational institution. Volosatîi has businesses in the construction sector, his family owns a construction company, SRL Sinteza-OS, of which his wife is the founder and administrator.

Volosatîi is a supporter of the unification of Moldova and Romania. He is the president of the Committee for the Salvation of the Heroes' Cemetery Memorial Complex, which strives for the preservation of the Chișinău Heroes' Cemetery, a World War II cemetery of Romanian soldiers. The committee, together with the Public Association Union – ODIP and Moldovan veterans of the Transnistria War, celebrated the Romanian Armed Forces Day on 25 October 2018 at the cemetery. Volosatîi was also the president of the Congress of Teachers (Congresul Profesorilor), a Romanian patriotic association of Moldovan teachers and students founded on 21 February 2017. On 1 December 2018, on the occasion of the Great Union Day (the national day of Romania) and the centenary of the Great Union, teachers and students of the Gheorghe Asachi Romanian-French High School, still led by Volosatîi at the time, displayed a banner on a floor of the high school with a map of a united Moldova and Romania and the phrase "History obliges us". Volosatîi later received the award "Ambassador of the Union" (Ambasador al Unirii) by then Action 2012 leader George Simion.

Volosatîi tried for years to get involved in politics. He ran for two times on the list of candidates of the Liberal Democratic Party of Moldova (PLDM) for local elections in Chișinău for the position of councillor, which he obtained only for a short period of time in 2014 after the resignation of PLDM councillor Victor Roșca. Volosatîi was a PLDM candidate for the 2015 Moldovan local elections and again did not obtain any position, and ran as an independent candidate in the 2019 Moldovan parliamentary election again without success.

Volosatîi was the first on the list of candidates of the Alliance for the Union of Romanians (AUR) for the constituency of the Romanian diaspora in the Chamber of Deputies for the 2020 Romanian parliamentary election. The party won over 25% of the votes from the diaspora and Volosatîi became a deputy of the Parliament of Romania. He thus became the only Bessarabian (from Bessarabia, a region including most of the territory of Moldova) in the 2020–2024 legislature of the Romanian Parliament. As he gained his new position as deputy and his mandate as director of the Gheorghe Asachi Romanian-French High School expired, Volosatîi moved to Bucharest. On 10 September 2022, during an extraordinary congress, Volosatîi was elected president of the Moldovan branch of AUR. He succeeded Vlad Bilețchi, who had been his parliamentary councillor until June 2022.
