= 1994 Moldovan referendum =

- 6 March 1994
- Are you for the Republic of Moldova to develop as an independent and indivisible state within the borders recognized by the UN, to promote a policy of neutrality, to maintain mutually beneficial economic relations with any country and to guarantee all its citizens equal rights according to the norms of international law?

Results
Choice	Votes	%
Yes	1,722,602	97.92%
No	36,546	2.08%
Valid votes	1,759,148	97.28%
Invalid or blank votes	49,146	2.72%
Total votes	1,808,294	100.00%
Registered voters/turnout	2,407,964	75.1%

A referendum on remaining an independent nation was held in Moldova on 6 March 1994. Initiated by President Mircea Snegur, it was referred to as a "Consultation with the people" (Romanian: La sfat cu poporul), and was approved by 97.9% of voters.

== Question ==
Are you for the Republic of Moldova to develop as an independent and indivisible state within the borders recognized by the UN, to promote a policy of neutrality, to maintain mutually beneficial economic relations with any country and to guarantee all its citizens equal rights according to the norms of international law? (Note: Romanian: Sînteți pentru ca Republica Moldova să se dezvolte ca stat independent și integru în hotarele recunoscute de O.N.U., să promoveze o politică de neutralitate, să întrețină relații economice reciproc avantajoase, cu orice țară și să garanteze tuturor cetățenilor ei drepturi egale conform normelor de drept internațional?)

== Legality issues ==
The referendum was organized by a specially created republican commission after the Central Elections Commission refused to become involved. However, its organization was in contravention of the 1992 referendums law, which stated that a referendum commission should have been formed by Parliament 60 days before the referendum, and no referendums should be held 90 days either side of elections (the parliamentary elections had been held a week earlier).

== Results ==
Choice	Votes	%
For	1,722,602	97.92
Against	36,546	2.08
Total	1,759,148	100.00
Valid votes	1,759,148	97.28
Invalid/blank votes	49,146	2.72
Total votes	1,808,294	100.00
Registered voters/turnout	2,407,964	75.10
Source: Nohlen & Stöver

== Aftermath ==
Many public figures and much of the press presented the referendum as a strong blow to the movement for unification of Moldova and Romania in both countries, despite the fact that the question did not refer directly to Romania, but to independence. It also referred to territorial integrity, which was a main preoccupation due to the Transnistria conflict.

== See also ==
- Moldovan neutrality
