= Vlad Bilețchi =

Moldovan activist, lawyer and politician

President of the Alliance for the Union of Romanians^{[a]}
- In office 27 March 2021 – 15 May 2022
- Succeeded by: Boris Volosatîi

Personal details
- Born: 7 September 1994 (age 31) Chișinău, Moldova
- Party: Alliance for the Union of Romanians (2020–present)
- Other political affiliations: Liberal Party (until 2019)
- Education: Moldova State University
- Occupation: Civic activist, politician, lawyer
- Religion: Romanian Orthodox Church (Metropolis of Bessarabia)
- a. of the Moldovan branch of the party

Vlad Bilețchi (born 7 September 1994) is a Moldovan lawyer and politician. He is an activist for the unification of Moldova and Romania and was president of the Moldovan branch of the Alliance for the Union of Romanians (AUR) political party.

== Personal life ==
Bilețchi was born on 7 September 1994 in Chișinău, Moldova. He was born into a family of intellectuals, with his grandfather being the Moldovan historian and literary critic Nicolae Bilețchi, from whom he claims to have inherited his "love" for "the tricolor" (the Romanian flag) and the Romanian nation. After finishing his Baccalaureate, Vlad Bilețchi studied at the Economics Faculty of Moldova State University and specialized in business and administration, getting his degree in 2016 and later obtaining a master's degree in public law while studying at the Law Faculty of the same university. He therefore is a lawyer and also eventually became professor at the Gheorghe Asachi Romanian-French High School.

== Activism ==
Bilețchi is president of the unionist (with Romania) organization Public Association Union – ODIP, which he founded in 2014. This organization started in 2017 an information campaign about a possible union between Moldova and Romania to spread awareness in the country, starting in Chișinău in June and later spreading to localities of 13 different districts of Moldova from July to August through the so-called "Union Caravans". This campaign was successful, with about 100 people going to around 300 Moldovan localities. Bilețchi determined that there were people supporting the union in all these localities and that his goal in the future was to increase their number.

Bilețchi was one of the main organizers of a pro-union march with Romania in Chișinău on 25 March 2018 and of the 2018 Centenary March. Bilețchi and Union – ODIP were also involved in a restoration project started in 2018 for the Chișinău Heroes' Cemetery.

In 2019, Bilețchi and Union – ODIP participated in a campaign to rebuild the Kindergarten-Gymnasium Dimitrie Cantemir in the village of Aluatu and provide it with teaching material. The school was then the only school teaching in Romanian in the Taraclia District. Union – ODIP donated clothes, toys and books for the pupils, while an economic agent from Romania donated and installed the necessary equipment for the presence of Wi-Fi in the school. Other rebuilding works were financially backed by the Governments of Moldova and Romania.

== Political career ==
In the 2019 Moldovan parliamentary election, Bilețchi postulated as a candidate for the Liberal Party of Moldova although he was not part of the party.

In March 2020, he joined the Alliance for the Union of Romanians (AUR), a political party from Romania. He ran as a candidate for the Moldovan branch of the party during the 2021 Moldovan parliamentary election.

Bilețchi criticized Igor Dodon and his 2021 statements in which he threatened to expel the ambassadors of Western countries (including Romania) and the European Union (EU) in Moldova. On the 29th anniversary of the Transnistria War, Bilețchi and Union – ODIP protested in front of the Russian embassy in Chișinău about the presence of Russian troops in Transnistria and demanded their withdrawal.

Bilețchi resigned as president of the Moldovan branch of AUR on 30 January 2022, but he maintained his powers as president until 15 May. On this day, an extraordinary congress took place with the aim of electing a new president of the party. Another extraordinary congress on 10 September elected Boris Volosatîi as the new president.
