= Spiridon Vangheli =

Moldovan writer and poet (1932–2024)

Spiridon Vangheli OR
- Born: 14 June 1932; Grinăuţi, Romania (now Moldova)
- Died: 21 June 2024 (aged 92); Chișinău, Moldova
- Occupations: Children's writer; poet; translator

Spiridon Vangheli (14 June 1932 – 21 June 2024) was a Moldovan writer of children's books, poet, and translator.

== Life and career ==
Vangheli was born in Grinăuţi, Moldova on 14 June 1932. He graduated from Ion Creangă State Pedagogical University in 1955, and after various jobs in schools, including as math professor, he joined the Moldovan Writers' Union and became a consulting editor.

His publishing debut was in 1962, with a book for children titled In the Land of Butterflies.

His books have been translated into 40 languages.

Vangheli died in Chișinău on 21 June 2024, at the age of 92.

== Legacy ==
His most characteristic work is a series of children's books about the adventures of Guguță, a boy who received from his father a large traditional lamb skin hat that became an inseparable attribute. In the story, Guguţă invites his classmates and the entire village to snuggle under the hat, protecting everyone from the winter cold. As more people join, the hat grows bigger, becoming a metaphor of growing generosity. The books about Guguţă became popular and the personage became a national symbol.

== Works ==
- 1964, Chișinău, The Little Boy in the Blue Hut
- 1967, București, The Adventures of Guguță
- 1970, Chișinău, Abecedarul, in collaboration with Grigore Vieru and painter Igor Vieru
- 1979, Chișinău, Guguță—Captain of the Ship
- 1981, Chișinău, The Horse With Blue Eyes
- 2001, Chișinău, Children In the Handcuffs of Siberia
