= Alecu Reniță =

Moldovan politician (born 1954)

Alecu Reniță OR

Member of the Moldovan Parliament
- In office 17 April 1990 – 29 March 1994
- Parliamentary group: Popular Front
- Constituency: Basarabeasca

Personal details
- Born: Abaclia, Moldavian SSR, Soviet Union
- Party: Popular Front of Moldova

Alecu Reniță (born 8 November 1954) is a Moldovan politician. He is the chairman of the Ecological Movement of Moldova.

== Biography ==
He served as member of the Parliament of Moldova and is a leader of the Democratic Forum of Romanians in Moldova.
