= Grinăuți, Rîșcani =

Grinăuți
- Commune
- Location in Moldova
- Coordinates: 47°52′N 27°46′E
- Country: Moldova
- District: Rîșcani District

Population (2014)
  - Total: 1,070
- Time zone: UTC+2 (EET)
  - Summer (DST): UTC+3 (EEST)

Grinăuți is a commune in Rîșcani District, Moldova. It is composed of two villages, Ciobanovca and Grinăuți.

== Notable people ==
- Nicolae Dudău
- Vitalia Pavlicenco
