= Anatol Țăranu =

Moldovan politician

Anatol Țăranu OR
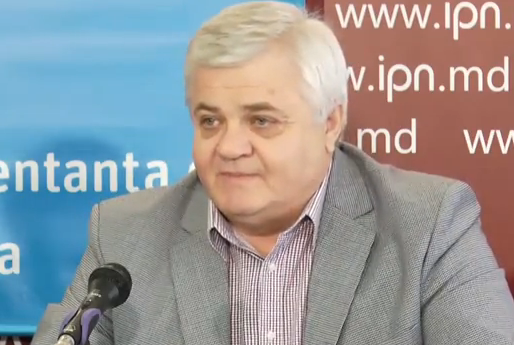
- Țăranu in 2014

Member of the Moldovan Parliament
- In office 24 March 2005 – 22 April 2009
- Parliamentary group: Our Moldova Alliance
- In office 17 April 1990 – 10 June 1993
- Parliamentary group: Popular Front
- Constituency: Telenești

Special Missions Advisor to the President
- In office 4 February 1997 – 5 June 1998
- President: Petru Lucinschi
- Succeeded by: Gheorghe Cîrlan

Moldovan Ambassador to Russia
- In office 10 June 1993 – 26 August 1994
- President: Mircea Snegur
- Prime Minister: Andrei Sangheli
- Preceded by: Petru Lucinschi
- Succeeded by: Valeriu Pasat

Personal details
- Born: 19 October 1951 (age 74) Chişinău, Moldavian SSR, Soviet Union
- Party: National Liberal Party (Moldova), Party Alliance Our Moldova
- Other political affiliations: Popular Front of Moldova
- Children: Teodor, Cristian, Gabriela
- Education: Moldova State University, 1978

Anatol Țăranu (born 19 October 1951) is a Moldovan former politician and diplomat.

== Biography ==
Țăranu holds a Ph.D. in history, 1986, and served as member of the Parliament of Moldova (1990–1993, 2005–2009). Țăranu has also been a chief expert for the Chişinău side during negotiations with separatist leaders in Transnistria. Between 1993 and 1995, Țăranu was Moldovan Ambassador to Moscow, and between 1997 and 1998 he was an advisor with special missions to the President of the Republic of Moldova. At the third congress of the Social Democratic Party, 25–26 February 1995, Anatol Țăranu was elected as a new head of the party.

After 2005 parliamentary election, Anatol Țăranu was excluded from Party Alliance Our Moldova. On 16 December 2006, Țăranu became a deputy chairman of the new National Liberal Party; Țăranu left the party in November 2008 because he disagreed with the party's decision to stand for parliament in 2009 jointly with the European Action Movement.

He currently works as Director of the Political Science and Political History Centre of the State University of Moldova and at the History Institute of the Academy of Sciences of Moldova, where he worked before becoming a deputy.
