= Stanislav Belkovsky =

Russian political analyst (born 1971)

- Станислав Белковский
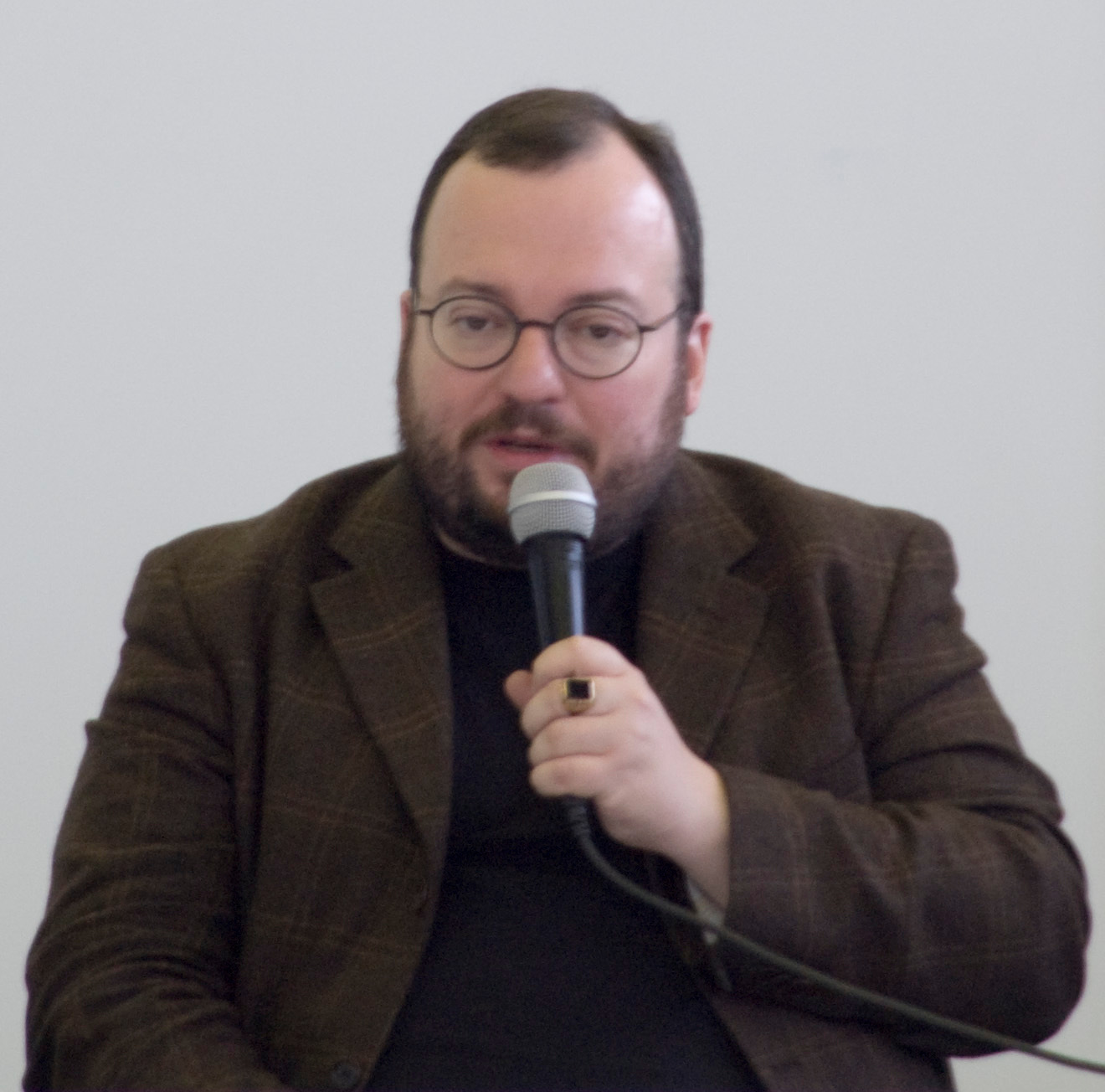
- Belkovsky in 2008
- Born: 7 February 1971 (age 55); Moscow, Russian SFSR, Soviet Union
- Citizenship: Russia
- Education: State University of Management
- Occupations: campaign manager, opinion journalist, columnist, radio host
- Children: 1

Stanislav Aleksandrovich Belkovsky (Russian: Станисла́в Алекса́ндрович Белко́вский; born 7 February 1971) is a Russian political analyst and communication specialist.

Belkovsky is a commentator on a variety of political issues, including Russian oligarchs, such as Mikhail Khodorkovsky. In 2003 Belkovsky co-authored a paper entitled "State and Oligarchy" which many considered as the ideological justification of Mikhail Khodorkovsky's arrest and trial. In 2005 Belkovsky announced that he is co-authoring a book with Eduard Limonov, at the time the head of the National-Bolshevik Party. Belkovsky has published allegations about Vladimir Putin's personal wealth, according to which Putin "controls a 4.5% stake in Gazprom, 37% in Surgutneftegas" as well as 50% in the oil-trading company Gunvor run by his close friend Gennady Timchenko. He coined the journalistic cliché "Puting" (Путинг), derived from the name of Russia's president from 2000-2008 and 2012–present, to denote the process of the renationalisation of Russia's oil industry assets.

In 2023, Belkovksy was declared a "foreign agent" by the Russian government.
