= Ecological Movement of Moldova =

Mişcarea Ecologistă din Moldova
- Formation: 1993
- Type: NGO
- Purpose: Environmental protection
- Headquarters: 13 S. Lazo St., Chişinău
- Region served: Moldova
- Website: mem.md

The Ecological Movement of Moldova (Romanian: Mişcarea Ecologistă din Moldova) is an environmental organization in Moldova.

== Overview ==
Ecological Movement of Moldova is a national, non-governmental, nonprofit organization formed on November 15, 1990. It has ten regional organizations and 15 affiliated organizations. MEM is a member of the International Union for Conservation of Nature. The movement is national representative of the Center "Naturopa" of the Council of Europe and United Nations Environment Programme of the United Nations.

The newspaper of the organization is "Natura". The chairman of the Ecological Movement of Moldova is Alecu Reniță. In 1990 the movement had 70,000 members; in 1998, it had 10,000.
