= Unionist Movement of the Republic of Moldova =

Unionist Movement of the Republic of Moldova Mișcarea Unionistă din Republica Moldova
- President: Ilie Bratu
- Founded: November 6, 2005
- Headquarters: Chişinău, Moldova
- Ideology: Conservatism political union of Moldova and Romania; Pro-Europeanism; Atlanticism; Liberal conservatism

The Unionist Movement of the Republic of Moldova (MURM or Romanian: Mișcarea Unionistă din Republica Moldova) is an organization and political party which has as its main goal the political union of Moldova and Romania.

== History ==
The organization has already started procedures to become a political party in the Republic of Moldova. Its president, Ilie Bratu, has stated that it would run in the July 2009 Moldovan parliamentary election parliamentary elections 2009.

On October 29, 2006, the MURM organized a protest against the then Communist leadership of Moldova, demanding that it should immediately start negotiations with Romania, aimed at uniting the two states. Further protests were held from December 3, 2006.
