= Vitalia Pavlicenco =

Moldovan politician (born 1953)

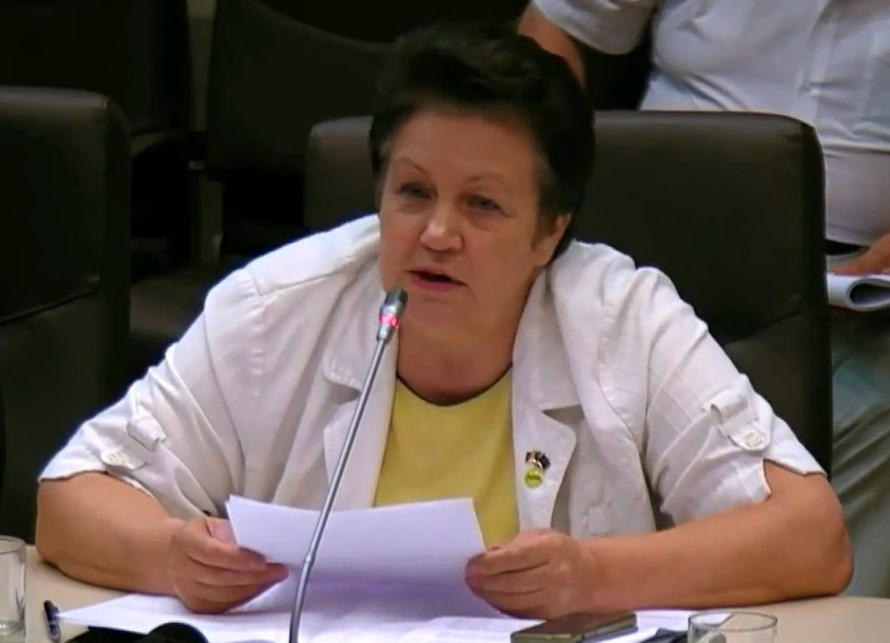
- Pavlicenco in 2017

Leader of the National Liberal Party
- In office 17 March 2005 – 22 April 2009
- Succeeded by: Ion Calmîc (acting)

Member of the Moldovan Parliament
- In office 17 March 2005 – 22 April 2009
- Parliamentary group: Our Moldova Alliance
- In office 21 April 1998 – 13 March 2001
- Parliamentary group: Party of Democratic Forces

Personal details
- Born: 29 October 1953 (age 72) Grinăuți, Rîșcani, Moldavian SSR, Soviet Union
- Party: National Liberal Party
- Other political affiliations: Electoral Bloc Democratic Moldova

Vitalia Pavlicenco (born 29 October 1953) is a Moldovan politician. She was the head of the National Liberal Party (Moldova).

== Biography ==
Vitalia Pavlicenco was born on October 29, 1953, in Grinăuți, Rîșcani. She grew up without a father because her father Victor Vangheli, a math and history teacher at the village school, was killed on June 26, 1953, at the age of 24, four months before Vitalia was born. Her mother, Agafia Vangheli, was a teacher of Romanian and French.

After the collapse of the USSR, Vitalia Pavlicenco became the first deputy director general of the National Press Agency "Moldova-Pres" (1990–1994) and then editor-in-chief of Mesagerul (1994–1998).

== Political life ==
She served as member of the Parliament of Moldova (1998–2001, 2005–2009). She also held the positions of vice-president of the Union of Journalists from the Republic of Moldova and vice-president of the Romanian World Council.

== Personal life ==
Vitalia Pavlicenco is married to Sergiu Pavlicenco, a hispanist professor at the State University of Moldova. The two have a daughter together, Beatriz Pavlicenco who is a violinist and lives in Germany. At one point, the Pavlicenco family lived in Cuba, where their daughter, Beatriz, was also born.
