= Oazu Nantoi =

Moldovan politician and political analyst

Oazu Nantoi OR
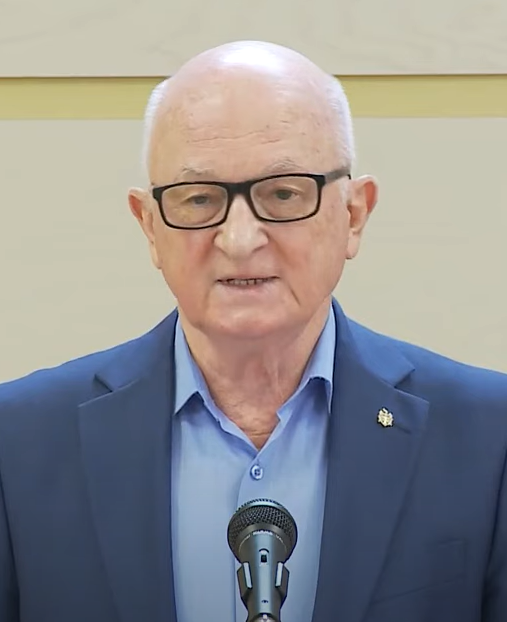
- Nantoi in 2021

Member of the Moldovan Parliament
- In office 9 March 2019 – 16 October 2025
- Parliamentary group: Party of Action and Solidarity
- In office 16 March 2010 – 24 December 2010
- Preceded by: Valentina Buliga
- Parliamentary group: Democratic Party

Member of the Chișinău Municipal Council
- In office 13 July 2015 – 30 January 2018
- Succeeded by: Valentina Țapiș
- In office 31 July 2007 – 15 April 2010
- Preceded by: Vlad Filat
- Succeeded by: Iurie Chiorescu

Personal details
- Born: 3 February 1948 (age 78) Vanchykivtsi, Ukrainian SSR, Soviet Union (now Ukraine)
- Citizenship: Moldova
- Party: European People's Party; Democratic Party of Moldova; Social Democratic Party; Popular Front of Moldova
- Education: Technical University of Moldova
- Profession: Engineer, Political Analyst

Oazu Nantoi (born 3 February 1948) is a Moldovan politician and political analyst who served as member of the Parliament of Moldova.

== Biography ==
Oazu Nantoi was born to Orthodox Christian Romanian parents from the Vanchykivtsi (Romanian: Vancicăuții Mari) village in the Hotin County, Romania. However, Nantoi himself was born during the Soviet period. According to the Soviet policy regarding most ethnic Romanians living in the USSR, he was registered as ethnic Moldovan. His birth certificate is in Ukrainian as, following the Allied victory in WW II, the Soviets had annexed and incorporated the region in Ukrainian SSR. While in high school, Nantoi's mother was into Indian epic literature and decided that when she got married and had a son, she would name him Oazu. Nantoi's father was the school master and his mother was a teacher with the local village school. His father, due to some conflicts at work, moved in 1964 to a school in another village where he worked one year. As of 1965, at the age of 36, he moved to Chișinău, did the postgraduate studies, and studied the CPSU history. In 1965, Oazu with his mother joined him in Chișinău. When the Pedagogical Institute was re-established, his father got the position of the dean of the Department of Philology. He accepted it yet requested to be offered an apartment. The request was granted, and his family joined him in Chișinău. While studying at Polytechnic Institute, Oazu was selected in the parachuting team of Moldova. After a pause of 31 years, since 2004, he resumed jumping with parachute. He was not a member of the Communist Party of Moldova. In 1970, he graduated from the Polytechnic Institute of Chișinău. He worked at the Academy of Sciences of Moldova.

== Professional activity ==
In 1990-1991, he was the deputy Director general of the „Moldova-Press” Agency. In 1991-1992, he was the Head of the Policy Analysis Department within the Presidency of the Republic of Moldova. In 1995-1998, he was the Director of the Enterprise „Euro-alco”. Since 2000 by now, he is the Program Director in Conflicts Management at the Institute of Public Policies. In 1992-1994 and 1996-1998 the member of the Board of the Soros Foundation of Moldova.

== Political activity ==
On October 13, 1989, he was elected as deputy president of the Board of the Popular Front of Moldova. On 13 May 1990 Oazu Nantoi created the Social Democratic Party (Moldova). In 2009-2010, he was an MP in the Parliament of the Republic of Moldova from the Democratic Party side. Nantoi has been proposed as a candidate in the Moldovan presidential election, 2011–2012.

In March 2015, he stacked to the Iurie Leancă party, European People's Party of Moldova, and became the candidate of the electoral block "European People’s Platform of Moldova – Iurie Leancă" for the position of the general mayor of Chișinău municipality. At the local elections held on Jun 14, 2015, Oazu Nantoi has gathered 10,18% of the votes, being listed at the 3rd place in the first round of elections, after Dorin Chirtoacă and Zinaida Greceanîi, and thus, did not manage to enter into the second round of elections.

In 2015, he participated in establishing of the Civil Platform „Dignity and Truth”. He was elected member of Parliament of Moldova in the 2019 parliamentary election running as independent within the ACUM Electoral Bloc.

== Private life ==
Oazu Nantoi is married and has two children, Sergiu (born on October 13, 1973) and Gheorghe.
