= Social Democratic Party (Moldova) =

Social Democratic Party Partidul Social Democrat
- President: Victor Şelin
- General Secretary: Sergiu Coropceanu
- Founded: 13 May 1990 (PSDM)
- Headquarters: Chișinău
- Ideology: Social democracy
- Political position: Centre-left
- Continental affiliation: Forum of Socialists of the CIS Countries
- Colours: Red and White

Website
- http://www.psdm.md

The Social Democratic Party (Romanian: Partidul Social Democrat, PSD) is an extra-parliamentary political party in Moldova currently led by Victor Șelin.

== History ==
In the autumn of 1989, the materials of the 18th Stockholm Congress of Socialist International reached Chişinău from Estonia and did stir up a lot of debates among those dissatisfied with the political realities in Moldovan SSR. The party was founded on May 13, 1990, when was known as the Social Democratic Party of Moldova (Romanian: Partidul Social-Democrat din Moldova, PSDM). The Founding Conference elected Oazu Nantoi, Ion Negură, Alexandru Coșelev as the Party Co-Chairpersons. Initially, the Social-Democratic Party of Moldova fought for the independence of the Moldovan SSR. That was the first party to promote the values of European social democracy in Moldova.

At the third congress of the party, held 25–26 February 1995, Anatol Țăranu was elected as a new head of the party. On the eve of 1996 presidential elections, Social Democrats were the only ones to openly support Petru Lucinschi. From 1996 to 1998, the party underwent some internal problems generated from within by controversial opinions on the party political course as well as from outside. This internal crisis culminated in 1998, when Gheorghe Sima group left the party. The old team headed by Oazu Nantoi took over the party leadership.

Oazu Nantoi was a member of the Government of Moldova, but he resigned from Government in March 2000 and the 7th Congress of the party, 27–28 May 2000, was just the first step towards launching its own candidate as the president of Moldova. Social-Democratic Party of Moldova was a member of the Socialist International. Incumbent Party Chairperson, Oazu Nantoi, attended in November 1999 the 21st Paris Congress of the Socialist International.

At the seventh congress of the party, 1 February 2004, Oazu Nantoi came with a proposition for Ion Mușuc (famous businessman in telecommunications) to take over the party leadership and refused he himself to be designated. In 1999 Social Democrats insisted on Ion Muşuc candidacy for the position of Mayor of Chișinău.

At the legislative elections on March 6th, 2005, the party won 2.9% of the popular vote, but no seats. In December 2007 the party merged with the Social Democracy Party (Partidul Democraţiei Sociale, PDS) of former prime minister Dumitru Braghiș. Some representatives of the Centrist Union of Moldova joined the new party, too. They didn't agree with the decision of their leader, Mihai Petrache, to abandon the process of negotiation regarding the unification of social democrats that had started some months before. Braghis has become new leader of the merged party. Eduard Mușuc, who was the chairman of the Social Democratic Party of Moldova before the fusion congress, has become the new secretary general of the party.

In June 2008, Eduard Muşuc formed a coalition with the Party of Communists of the Republic of Moldova and Christian Democratic People's Party to become president of the City Council of Chişinău. The year before the party's president Braghis was heavily criticized by the same communists when he ran for mayor. Some party members saw this as betrayal and left the party for Liberal Democratic Party of Moldova (PLDM).

In February 2010, it was reported that approximately 11,000 members of the PSD defected to the rival centre-left Democratic Party of Moldova.

Following the 12th party congress, on April 17, 2010, Victor Șelin has been elected as the new party president.

== Electoral results ==
The party took part in the 1994 (3.66%), 1998 (1.86%), 2001 (2.47%), 2005 (2.92%), July 2009, 2010 parliamentary elections, but didn't pass the threshold of representation.

The party took part in the local election: 1995 (39 mandates in the rayonal and municipal councils (3.09%), 273 mandates in city and village councils (2.58%), 23 mayor mandates (2.89%), 1999 (16 mandates in the rayonal and municipal councils (5.13%), 249 mandates in city and village councils (4.08%), 18 mayor mandates (2.86%), 2003 (38 mandates in the rayonal and municipal councils (3.37%), 500 mandates in city and village councils (4.61%), 44 mayor mandates (4.90%), 2007 (36 mandates in the rayonal and municipal councils (3.21%), 294 mandates in city and village councils (2.77%), 15 mayor mandates (1.67%).

== Notable members and former members ==
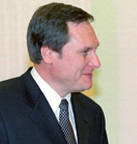
Dumitru Braghiș

- Oazu Nantoi
- Anatol Țăranu
- Ion Negură
- Victor Șelin
- Dumitru Braghiș
- Ion Mușuc
- Eduard Mușuc
- Alexandru Coșelev
- Gheorghe Sima, Minister of Education (26 February 2002 – 2 July 2003)
