= Oleg Brega =

Moldovan journalist, activist and filmmaker

- Born: October 26, 1973 (age 52); Pepeni, Sângerei District
- Education: Academy for Theater and Film in Bucharest
- Relatives: Ghenadie, Vitalie, Olga, Sergiu-Nicolae (siblings)

Oleg Brega (born October 26, 1973) is a Moldovan journalist, activist and filmmaker from Chişinău, the Republic of Moldova. He has been the president of the Moldovan public activism group Hyde Park since 2003. Oleg Brega hosts the show "Inamicul Public" (The public enemy), on Jurnal TV.

Oleg Brega worked for TeleRadio-Moldova (September 1, 1992 – September 15, 1995). He graduated from the Music, Theater and Fine Arts Academy, Chişinău (1996) and the Academy for Theater and Film in Bucharest (1999). In 2001, Brega began to host a nightly radio show called Hyde Park on Antena C; the Moldovan Ministry of the Interior soon intervened, and the program was shut down.

On March 10, 2008, Oleg Brega was assaulted by the Prime Minister's bodyguards in the hallway of the Moldova National Opera Ballet which hosted a meeting of Prime Minister Zinaida Greceanîi. In May 2008, Oleg Brega was arrested for peacefully protesting in front of the National Palace where a celebration was held to mark the 50th anniversary of the foundation of Moldova 1. The Buiucani District Court ruled that his placard, which bore the inscription "50 Years of Lies", constituted "injury" and sentenced him to three days' detention.

His group Hyde Park, founded in 2003 after his radio show of the same name was shut down, helped organise 2009 Moldova civil unrest. On April 9, 2009, Amnesty International wrote that "Oleg Brega, Ghenadie Brega and Natalia Morari are currently in hiding for fear of being arrested."
