= Bilicenii Noi =

- Commune
- Location within Moldova
- Coordinates: 47.6983333333°N 28.0333333333°E
- Country: Moldova
- District: Sîngerei

Population (2014)
  - Total: 1,809
- Time zone: UTC+2 (EET)
  - Summer (DST): UTC+3 (EEST)

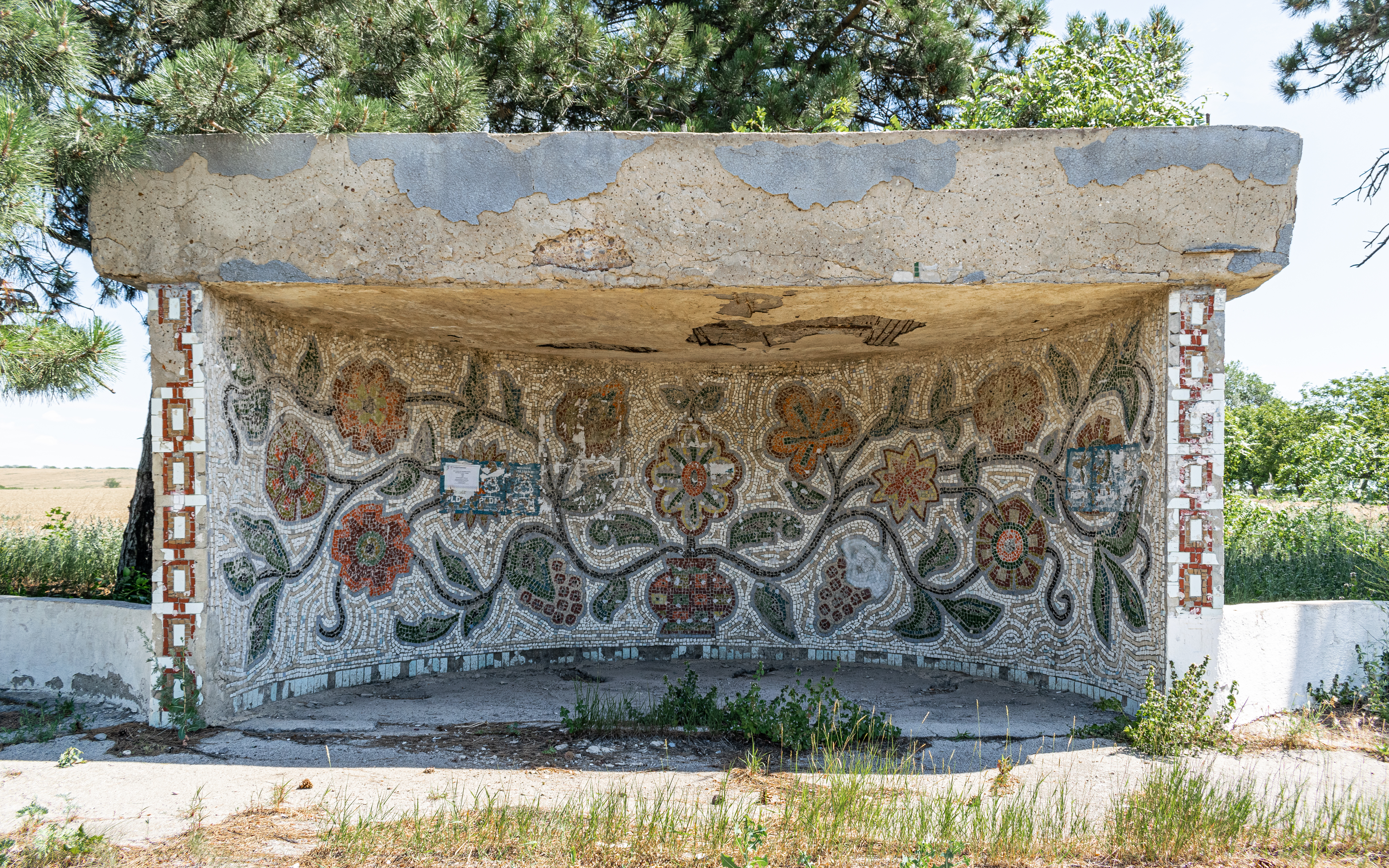

Bilicenii Noi is a commune in Sîngerei District, Moldova. It is composed of three villages: Bilicenii Noi, Lipovanca and Mîndreștii Noi.
