= Eduard Mușuc =

Moldovan politician (born 1975)

Member of the Moldovan Parliament
- In office 28 August 2009 – 9 December 2014
- Parliamentary group: Party of Communists

President of the Chișinău Municipal Council
- In office 6 June 2008 – 13 February 2009
- Preceded by: Mihai Ghimpu
- Succeeded by: Ghenadie Dumanschi

Personal details
- Born: Bălți, Moldavian SSR, Soviet Union

Eduard Mușuc (born 25 September 1975) is a Moldovan politician. In 2010 he was elected as a Member of Parliament representing the Party of Communists of the Republic of Moldova.
