= Victor Șelin =

Moldovan politician (born 1965)

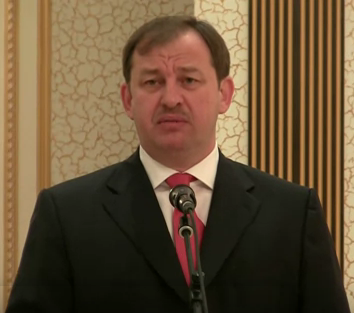
- Șelin in 2012

President of the Social Democratic Party
- Incumbent
- Assumed office 17 April 2010
- Preceded by: Eduard Mușuc

Personal details
- Born: 19 August 1965 (age 61) Rîșcani, Moldavian SSR, Soviet Union
- Children: 2
- Education: State University of Moldova

Victor Șelin (born 19 August 1965) is a Moldovan businessman, politician, and former journalist, currently president of the Social Democratic Party of Moldova.

== Education and early career ==
Șelin is a graduate of the Faculty of Journalism of the State University of Moldova. He worked as editor at "Teleradio-Moldova" until 1989, when he left journalism, entering the business. He remained present in the field of journalism through the Russian newspaper "Vremea", which he is patronizing. He is the owner of the Moldovan cinema network "Patria", which is а monopoly in Moldova. Also among other business he has, he owns the amusement park "Aventura Park", one of the largest and most famous amusement parks in Chișinău. According to the magazine "VIP Magazin", Șelin founded the first private security agency in the Republic of Moldova; and thanks to it, Moldova was the first CIS country to have a law on detective activity.

== Political career ==
In the elections of 5 April 2009, Victor Şelin ranks third in the list of the Social Democratic Party of Moldova, but was not on the list of repeated elections, to which the SDP was already headed by former Prime Ministers Dumitru Braghiș and Vasile Tarlev.

Previously, he was part of the formation "Plai Natal" and the Our Moldova Alliance, which he left in 2004 after a public quarrel with Serafim Urechean.

== Personal life ==
Șelin is married and has two children.
