= Alexandru Robot =

Soviet writer

- Alexandru Robot, photographed in the 1930s
- Born: Alter Rotmann; January 15, 1916; Bucharest
- Died: ca. 1941 (aged 25) probably near Odesa
- Occupations: poet, novelist, journalist, critic
- Writing career
- Period: 1932-1941
- Genres: experimental literature, lyric poetry, essay, pastoral, reportage, travel literature
- Literary movement: avant-garde, modernism, Symbolism, Expressionism, Viața Basarabiei, Socialist Realism

Alexandru Robot (Romanian pronunciation: [alekˈsandru ˈrobot]; born Alter Rotmann, also known as Al. Robot; Moldovan Cyrillic: Александру Робот; January 15, 1916 – c. 1941) was a Romanian, Moldovan and Soviet poet, also known as a novelist and journalist. First noted as a member of Romanian literary clubs, and committed to modernism and the avant-garde, he developed a poetic style based on borrowings from Symbolist and Expressionist literature. Also deemed a "Hermeticist" for the lexical obscurity in some of his poems, as well as for the similarity between his style and that of Ion Barbu, Robot was in particular noted for his pastorals, where he fused modernist elements into a traditionalist convention.

Adopted by the literary circles in the Bessarabia region, where he settled in 1935, Robot was employed by the literary review Viața Basarabiei. In tandem with his avant-garde activities, he was a political-minded journalist with communist sympathies, who wrote reportage pieces and essays around various social, political and cultural topics. During the 1940 annexation of Bessarabia, Robot opted to stay behind in Soviet territory, adopting Socialist Realism and paying allegiance to the Moldavian SSR's official line on nationality issues. This move sparked a posthumous controversy, but some have argued it only implied a formal submission on Robot's part.

Robot was declared missing some two months after the German-Romanian takeover of Bessarabia, dying in mysterious circumstances. His avant-garde literary work remained largely unknown until the 1960s, when it was rediscovered by a new generation of Bessarabian writers.

== Biography ==
=== Early life ===
The future poet was a native of Bucharest, born to Jewish Romanian parents Carol Rotman and Toni Israel, with a working class family background. His father was, according to conflict accounts, either a clerk or the warden of a Jewish cemetery in Bucharest. Alter Rotmann studied for a while at the city's Spiru Haret High School, but dropped out in order to begin work as a reporter for the cultural magazine Rampa, and later had his articles featured in such periodicals as Universul, Cuvântul Liber and Viața Literară.

Robot made his editorial debut in 1932, at age 16, with the lyric poetry volume Apocalips terestru ("Terrestrial Apocalypse"). Over the following period, he was acknowledged in sympathetic literary chronicles authored by critics with academic credentials or by fellow poets, among them George Călinescu, Eugen Lovinescu, Perpessicius and Ion Pillat. Writing in 2006, Moldovan philologist Vladimir Prisăcaru (Vlad Pohilă) defined the then aspiring author as "a precocious and vigorous, picturesque, dissipated and extremely prolific talent."

The same years brought Alexandru Robot's contribution to short-lived magazines published by avant-garde circles from the Romanian Old Kingdom. Alongside authors such as Dan Petrașincu and Pericle Martinescu, he was featured in bobi, a young writers' periodical. He joined them again on Petrașincu's Discobolul, and also had samples of his work featured in Cristalul (published by a modernist circle in Găești). Robot was also among the young writers who contributed to the literary review Ulise, launched in Bucharest by critic Lucian Boz. In June 1933, Rampa published his interview with Romanian philosopher and modernist novelist Mircea Eliade, in which the latter discussed his recent journey into British India.

=== Relocation to Bessarabia ===
In 1935, Robot took the decision of leaving his home region, the Old Kingdom, and made his way to Chișinău, the cultural capital of Bessarabia region (at the time part of Greater Romania). This sudden choice, Moldovan literary historian Iurie Colesnic notes, was an unusual one: "It is hard to understand what drew [Robot] to Chișinău, where the literary environment was one of very modest means, where pressure upon Bessarabians on the Romanian language issue was very acute, where all things political was required not to have left-wing influences, for Bessarabia was under suspicion of being Bolshevized." The subsequent identification with the region was a partial one, as suggested by Moldovan critic Eugen Lungu's use of "semi-Bessarabian" in his definition of Robot's cultural belonging. Vladimir Prisăcaru however describes as "impressive" that manner in which Robot chose to identify himself with the culture of Chișinău (casually referred to by the poet as "our city"): "one is left with the impression that Al. Robot and Chișinău were displaying themselves as two communicating vessels."

Shortly after his arrival, the young author was employed by fellow poet Nicolai Costenco on the editorial staff of Viața Basarabiei literary review, but mostly worked as a reporter for Gazeta Basarabiei newspaper. By then, Robot was a committed follower of leftist causes, who, Colesnic writes: "never tried to conceal his political opinions. [...] He was a sympathizer of the communist movement". The ideological choice in favor of communism and anti-fascism was partly reflected in his work for Viața Basarabiei, his various reportage pieces, and his travel literature. Robot traveled extensively throughout Bessarabia and the Budjak, covering the life of Lipovan fishermen in Vâlcov and public interest issues such as the trial in Chișinău of Romanian Communist Party militant Petre Constantinescu-Iași. Vladimir Prisăcaru writes that Robot had a "hard to explain predilection" for covering the Budjak (a region which is now part of Ukraine), and argues that the author had, "without hidden interest, evidenced [the region's] Romanian character".

His various other articles cover several subjects, including: a study of works by Ștefan Petică (a main representative of Romania's Symbolist current); an essay-like piece of social criticism, Pajurile mizeriei chișinăuiene ("The Crests of Chișinău's Squalor"); and a chronicle of Anton Holban's novel Ioana. Robot published a large number of critical sketches focusing on major figures in European and Romanian literature (from Luigi Pirandello, Sergei Yesenin and Charles Baudelaire to Mateiu Caragiale, Panait Istrati or Liviu Rebreanu), and was similarly interested in art, theater and ballet criticism (with pieces on Constantin Brâncuși, Victor Brauner, Vaslav Nijinsky and Anna Pavlova). In particular, Robot received praise for his interview with the Bessarabian-born actress Maria Cebotari.

A second volume of his poetry, Somnul singurătății ("The Slumber of Solitude"), saw print in 1936. It notably received praise from Costenco in Viața Basarabiei—according to Colesnic, although Robot was a "very subtle competitor" of Costenco, such appreciation from the latter illustrated "a justified literary solidarity, given that both had leftist political sympathies and promoted them consistently." At the time, Costenco was nuancing his own support for a neo-traditionalist school in literature (for which he had sought inspiration in the work of Romania's nationalist ideologue Nicolae Iorga), and was growing fond of avant-garde tendencies. The same year, the Bucharest-based official literary review, Revista Fundațiilor Regale, hosted the essay of modernist critic Vladimir Streinu, which discussed in four individual sections the works of poets Robot, Haig Acterian, Ștefan Baciu and Cicerone Theodorescu.

=== Soviet career and disappearance ===
Robot stayed behind in his adoptive region after Romania's 1940 cession of Bessarabia to the Soviet Union. This, Iurie Colesnic suggests, was "a conscious choice", and justified by Robot's belief that avant-garde poetry was well-appreciated by the Soviet administration (making him "the most obvious intellectual victim of Soviet propaganda"). Colesnic also writes: "I suppose that his disappointment after one year of living under the communist regime was profound and hard to mend." A similar argument is made by Eugen Lungu, who suggests that Robot "mimicked [...] the adherence to the happiness of the kolkhozniks" and, like other writers from the newly created Moldavian SSR, was made to comply with Socialist Realism. In particular, Lungu notes, Robot followed the official Soviet stance on a "Moldovan language", distinct from Romanian and regulated by the pedagogical institutions in Balta.

The writer was by then employed by the official communist newspaper Moldova Socialistă, but was unusually also still a contributor to Viața Basarabiei, which had moved to Bucharest in protest against Soviet occupation. In September 1940, when Romania was under fascist government (the National Legionary State), Robot even visited Lovinescu at his club in Bucharest. Lovinescu's concise record of the meeting, first published some 60 years later, depicts a fall-out between Robot and the modernist-turned-fascist Ion Barbu: "I. Barbu, odious, insane, wants blood [...]. Poor Robot gets an infernal reception from Barbu. An embarrassing afternoon on Barbu's account."

The political situation changed in late June 1941, when the Nazi German and Romanian troops began the sudden attack on the Soviet Union, occupying Bessarabia (see Romania during World War II). Robot was declared missing, and presumed dead, in August of the same year, his last known whereabouts being near Odesa, Ukrainian SSR. According to one account, he had been conscripted into the Red Army and died under arms. However, according to Vladimir Prisăcaru, Robot was a shipwreck victim, who died alongside other Bessarabian refugees, when their ship, sailing from Odesa to Crimea, sank in the Black Sea.

In addition to the novel Music-hall (or MUZIC-hall), the manuscripts he left behind include two notebooks of poems, titled respectively Îmblânzitorul de cuvinte ("The Tamer of Words") and Plecările și popasurile poetului ("The Poet's Departures and Rests"). Reportedly, Robot had also intended to print a selection of his communist-themed lyrical pieces under the title A înflorit Moldova ("Moldova Has Blossomed").

== Work ==
=== Modernism and Hermeticism ===
Alexandru Robot's poetry and prose illustrate a stage in the development of Romania and Moldova's avant-garde currents, marked by eclecticism and cosmopolitanism. Reviewing this development within the literary culture of Moldova, researcher Alexandru Burlacu defines the generation grouping Robot, Costenco and Vladimir Cavarnali as "the reformist orientation", in practice opposed to neo-traditionalist tendencies and accommodating all kinds of modernist tendencies: "Symbolist, Futurist, Expressionist, Imagist, Parnassian, Dadaist, Surrealist". Burlacu also includes in this line of authors the likes of Eugenio Coșeriu, Sergiu Grossu, Magda Isanos, Bogdan Istru, Alexandru Lungu, Vasile Luțcan, George Meniuc, Teodor Nencev, Sergiu Matei Nica and Octav Sargețiu, many of whom were featured in Costenco's magazine. Likewise, Moldovan scholar Timotei Roșca mentions Robot, Costenco, Isanos and Meniuc among those Bessarabians whose creative approach "manifests itself, most often, in a meditative setting, but who are not strangers to the gestures, the digressions, the strategic forces, and even the experimental ones, of a modernist type." More specifically, critics have identified Robot as a Symbolist, or as "an author swinging between Symbolism and Expressionism".

One commentator of Robot's work, literary historian George Călinescu, included Robot in the modernist section of Romanian literature, placing him in line with the "Dadaists, Surrealists, Hermeticists" of the 1930s, and noting his similarity with rival avant-garde poet Barbu. In his definition, Robot had adapted Barbu's "Hermeticism" into a mix which also included the licentious traits of post-Symbolist poet Camil Baltazar, and borrowings from the neo-traditionalist poems of Ion Pillat or Ilarie Voronca. Călinescu found Robot to be a "good versifier", with "wave"-like stanzas similar to "heavy silks", but suggested that the mix of styles lacked "any sort of intellectual cementing". In support of this verdict, he quoted lyrics were Robot expands on themes from Ancient Greek literature:

Aedul bea din coardă și spintecă herubul
Ofranda cântărește într-un călcâi hisop
Tiranul își străpunge pe o coloană trupul
Și urbea din egidă dezleagă pe Esop.

Translation:

The aoidos drinks from his string and cuts through the cherub
The offering weighs down inside a heel of hyssop
The tyrant impales his body on a column
And the city in aegis cuts the bonds of Aesop.

The stylistic connection to Barbu is also noted by Moldovan critic Ion Țurcanu. He assesses that, having probably been inspired by Barbu's volume Joc secund, Alexandru Robot had ventured to introduce his adoptive region to "a new and very capricious phenomenon, hermetic writing". In Țurcanu's view, Robot's poetry alternated such stylistic concerns with echoes from a wing of Romania's Symbolist environment: the aesthetic synthesis performed by celebrated writer Tudor Arghezi, whose Testament piece is believed by the same commentator to be at the source of Robot's Prefață ("Preface"). While he suggests that the more hermetic side of Robot's poetry may be confusing, with some lyrics only having "the meaning the reader decides to provide them with", Țurcanu comments that they may also contain "ornaments that would shame no poet". In reference to this, he cites the piece titled Madrigal:

Și luna care cată piciorul tău în iarbă,
Un fund amar de cupă întinde ca s-o soarbă,
Efebul care strânge metafore și fluturi.

Translation:

And the moon, searching for your foot in the grass,
Presents for sipping the bitter bottom of a cup,
To the ephebe who gathers metaphors and butterflies.

=== Pastorals ===
Robot followed these stylistic approaches in the pastoral genre, which forms a special segment of his writings: according to George Călinescu, it is one "of greater promise", but also "tiresome" in the long run. Călinescu makes mention of the connection between the choice of such subjects and Robot's Jewishness ("Biblical heredity"), expressed in stanzas ostensibly referencing the Land of Israel:

Alăturea de capre Sion încearcă plante
Ciobani închid tăcerea cu mugetul în țarc.
Orbii s-au dus cu bățul și Tine ca să caute
Răspântia sosirii vreunui patriarc.

Translation:

Next to goats, Zion tests its plants
Shepherds trap silence and mooing in the pen.
Blind men with canes and Thou with them are searching
The junction where some patriarch arrived.

In addition to such lyrics, Călinescu found praiseworthy those pieces in which Robot explores a rustic universe, populated by huntsmen, but disapproved of Robot's tendency to accompany with themes with "parasitical developments" of the subject and "Dodonian verdicts". In particular, he found "very beautiful images" in Robot's stanza about "a forest's mirroring in the water and the garden's mirroring in a cup":

Când plec la vânătoare cu câinii și cu arcul,
Și beau din apă codrul în care-ai vrea să mori,
Îți întâlnesc statura-n izvoare. Umpli parcul,
Cu șoldurile strânse în jerbe de fiori.

Grădina îți aruncă toți arborii în ceașcă
Și seara-și crește sânul singurătății până,
La semnul frunții tale, poftită în caleașcă
De un nebun cu harfă, care-a întins o mână.

Translation:

When I'm off hunting with my bow and hounds,
And drink from the water the forest where you'd fancy dying,
I come across your frame in springs. You fill up the park,
With your hips gripped by the sheafs of frissons.

The garden throws all its trees into the cup
And the evening expands its solitude's breast before
A signal from your brow, as you're led into the carriage
By a harp-holding fool with his arm extended.

In Iurie Colesnic's assessment, the bulk of Alexandru Robot's poetry showed the author to have been "such a refined poet, who was overflowing like a fountain with metaphors and similes, and whose fantasy seemed boundless." Colesnic illustrates this notion with another pastoral poem, Priveliște ("A View"), comprising lyrics such as:

Holde mari își freamătă păcatul.
Știu cum râmele au dat seminți.
(Căile creșteau făgăduinți
Și-ntorceau pe după soare satul).

Translation:

Great crops quiver with their sin.
I know how it was that earthworms gave them seed.
(The paths were yielding promises
And turned the village back around the sun).

=== Prose ===
Robot's contribution as a prose writer was in several ways innovative for its Romanian and Moldovan cultural contexts. His role in the "reform of [Romanian] prose" was commented upon by literary historian Mihai Zamfir, who listed Robot alongside a variety of significant voices in the Romanian novel of the 1930s (Max Blecher, H. Bonciu, Mircea Eliade, Constantin Fântâneru, Camil Petrescu, Anton Holban, Mihail Sebastian and Octav Șuluțiu). The poet's aesthetic accomplishment in prose form was discussed by Eugen Lungu, who called Robot "an acrobat of style."

Music-hall, Robot's only novel, is centered on the lives of mother and son dancers Tamara and Ygor. According to Romanian literary chronicler Mircea Mihăieș, a "psychoanalytical-Expressionist filter" is cast on the "troubling" narrative. Moldovan poet and critic Igor Ursenco defines the plot as a set of "adolescent experiences and complexes", but argues that, from the point of view of Robot's experimental literature, the book was written as a set of "unmistakable exercises in maturity". Prisăcaru sees the novel as an "original and modernist" work, populated by "ghostly characters".

A significant portion of Robot's literary contributions comprises short essays, building on observations made about events or customs. Colesnic, who finds such fragments to be "tiny literary jewels, that can be included in any textbook, in any anthology", centers his attention on a piece that Robot dedicated to (and named after) the Mărțișor spring custom (during which people wear the eponymous accessories, generally items of jewelry). It reads: "[On March 1] we will be decorating our necks, our chests, with the mărțișoare. These are the only decorations that are awarded without decrees, and without implying either heroism or virtue. [...] There is so much poetry in the fragility of mărțișoare, but it is such simple poetry that it was mistaken for the banal." Contrarily, in Pajurile mizeriei chișinăuiene, Robot spoke of Chișinău as a parochial and destitute place, with its overall image defined by the abundance of rooks: "The obsolete and disagreeable rooks, seemingly torn apart from a flag of morning, emblems and symbols of a calamity which never tears itself apart from Bessarabia's destiny, are characteristic for a city with two street car lines, one leading to the hospital and the other to the cemetery". Reflecting on the "adaptation to reality" that such imagery presumes, Romanian critic Ion Simuț notes that Robot's view is in sharp contrast with the regionalist and nativist theories of his Bessarabian-born friend Costenco.

== Legacy ==
Shortly after Alexandru Robot' disappearance, George Călinescu included him in his major synthesis of Romanian literature (first edition 1941). The inclusion of Robot's profile and other Jewish writers purposefully ignored the antisemitic policies of Romanian dictator Ion Antonescu, which included heavy censorship of Jewish literature (see Holocaust in Romania). Călinescu's work was subsequently attacked by the Romanian fascist newspaper Porunca Vremii, which specifically denied Robot's contribution to Romanian culture, and demanded for Călinescu to be punished so as to maintain "the cleanliness of the Romanian soul". Writing for Gândirea magazine in 1942, the fascist newspaperman N. Roșu also claimed: "in [Călinescu's] mockery of Romanian culture, Lascăr Sebastian and Al. Robot, ex-broadcasters for Radio Tiraspol, are assigned a place of importance. And Mr. G. Călinescu remains a university professor. For how long still? We shall see."

Inside the Soviet Union's Moldavian SSR, Robot's overall contribution was reassessed during the 1960s, and, similar to those of other authors who had died in the war, was republished by the state-run publishing houses. Such efforts were notably made by literary critic and historian Simion Cibotaru, who edited a selection of Robot's poems. However, George Meniuc was reputedly the first intellectual who reviewed Robot's poetry for a Soviet public, in a 1965 article for Moldova Socialistă, and sparked a long succession of similar studies by other authors and researchers. Until the fall of the Soviet Union and the independence of Moldova (1991), author Mihai Vakulovski argues, Robot was also one of the writers who received official approval, being deemed characteristic for the Moldavian SSR's culture. This view is contrasted by that of critic Iulian Ciocan, who deplores the isolation of Romanian writers in Bessarabia from the region's literary roots, and in particular their unfamiliarity with the "quality prose" of predecessors Robot and Constantin Stere.

According to Lungu, the Cibotaru edition even had an unforeseen subversive effect, by allowing local writers a rare glimpse into the non-official forms of literary culture. Reflecting back on the period, he notes: "The writings of this Bucharester hermeticist have withered away for a moment the emblems of socialist realism. [...] Robot's press contribution has forced us to acknowledge what stammerers we were, but also gave us some lessons free of charge." Although noting that "my generation has read, adored and even pastiched" Alexandru Robot, the same commentator concludes that the Robot's early death gave his creative destiny "a pale and vague virtuality", rendering irrelevant the encouragements Robot had received after his debut from Romanian critics (Călinescu, Eugen Lovinescu). Making reference to the fascination of younger writers in the 1960s, he also argued: "The interwar was sending through him a sample of what we were and what we could be, and so retied a string that had been so brutally torn apart". Among the Moldovan authors particularly influenced by Robot's avant-garde writings, and whose contribution resisted communist aesthetics, Igor Ursenco cites Vladimir Beșleagă and Aureliu Busuioc.

At around the same time, Robot was gaining a following in Communist Romania. Late in the 1960s, the literary magazine Viața Românească serialized Music-hall. Mircea Mihăieș recalls having been an enthusiastic reader of the work, and notes that there was still little the public could find out about Robot's biography. In the same context, Robot became the subject of a monograph by Dumitru Micu.

In 1993, Robot's verse work was collected in a Moldovan poetry collection, edited by Dumitru M. Ion (himself a poet), translated into Macedonian by Carolina Ilica and Dimo Naum Dimcov, and published by Kultura company in Skopje, Republic of Macedonia. The same year, his press articles were collected into a single volume, published in Bucharest by Editura Litera International company. An entry on Robot, one of 39 dedicated to Bessarabian authors, was included in the Czech-language Slovník rumunských spisovatelů ("Dictionary of Romanian Writers"), edited by Czech academics Libuše Valentová and Jiři Nasinec (2001). Samples of Robot's prose were also included in Eugen Lungu's 2004 anthology Literatura din Basarabia în secolul XX. Eseuri, critică literară ("20th Century Literature from Bessarabia. Essays, Literary Criticism"). A year later, his poetry was included in another volume of the series, this time published by poet Nicolae Leahu. Commenting on the latter selection in 2006, Ion Țurcanu noted: "Evidently, as poet, Robot is less known that he would have deserved." In the generation of Postmodernist writers to emerge around 1991, poet Emilian Galaicu-Păun also took inspiration from Robot's style, and published pieces with intertextual borrowings from Robot's own.

The poet was survived by his wife, who lived in relative obscurity in the Soviet Union and later in Moldova. In old age, she was interviewed by Moldovan journalist Gheorghe Budeanu, who recorded her recollections about life with Alexandru Robot, and details about the lesser known aspects of his biography. According to Colesnic: "she has not only rendered complete the portrait of poet Alexandru Robot, but also enhanced the enigma that still floats around [him]."

== See also ==
- List of people who disappeared
