= Literature of Moldova =

Literature of Moldova comprises the literature of the principality of Moldavia, the later trans-Prut Moldavia, Bessarabia, the Moldavian Autonomous Soviet Socialist Republic, the Moldavian Soviet Socialist Republic, and the modern Republic of Moldova, irrespective of the language. Although there has been considerable controversy over linguistic identity in Moldova, the Moldovan and Romanian languages are virtually identical and share a common literary history. Moldovan literature, therefore, has considerable overlap with Romanian literature.

== History ==
The creation of Moldovan written literature was preceded by a rich folklore that emerged in the 10th and 11th centuries CE: calendrical and family ritual poetry (Plugusorul), fairy tales, heroic epics (Hydra, Toma Alimos, The Knight Gruia Grozovan, Mihul Kopilul, Codreanu, Corbea), historical songs (Duca Vode, Buzhor, Tobultok), folk legends, proverbs, popular sayings, lyrical songs, ballads (The Sun and the Moon, The Rich Man and the Pauper, Dolca). The greatest achievement of Moldovan epic-lyric pastoral poetry is the ballad Mioriţa, various versions of which were found across Romania. The national struggle against the Ottoman occupation is reflected in the ballad The Well of Frost, which was popular not only in the Moldovan principality but also in Wallachia.

=== The Middle Ages ===
The first written records appeared in Moldova at the turn of the 10th-11th centuries CE in Old Church Slavonic (or Middle Bulgarian), which was the official language of the church and state until the 7th century, as well as the literary language. In this language appear the significant sacred and historical literature (The Life of St John the New and the preachings of Gregory Tsamblak), a hierarch of the Moldovan church between 1401 and 1403; anonymous chronicles of the 14th and 15th centuries, as well as those of Makarios, Eftimius, Azarius in the 16th century, and so on. The first Moldovan book was Kazania (interpretations of the Gospels) by the Metropolitan Barlaam (1590-1657) published in 1643. Barlaam's successor, Metropolitan Dosoftei (1624-1693) translated the Psalms in verse in the Romanian language.

From the 15th century, Moldovan literature absorbed influences from Latin literature, chiefly propagated by the Dominicans and the Franciscans, as well as southern Slavs (from Serbia and Bulgaria). The first half of the 17th century was marked by the awakening of nationalist consciousness among the Romanians. The Moldovan prince Vasile Lupu established a university, several publishing houses (from 1642), and introduced the first Moldavian legal code, especially laws on serfdom which provided a number of benefits to the big landowning classes.

The second half of the 15th century saw the development of historical literature in the Moldovan principality. The chronicles were compiled at the behest and supervision of the rulers, and were intended to glorify their reigns and actions. During the reign of Stefan the Great, an official chronicle was written in the Slavonic language: the original is lost, but its contents have been preserved in five different editions: Anonymous Chronicle, the Putna Monastery Chronicle (in two versions), a Moldovan-German chronicle, a Russo-Moldovan chronicle and a Moldovan-Polish chronicle. While all the editions include the reign of Stefan, there are differences and further additions by their scribes.

Moldovan chronography in Slavonic continued to develop in the 16th century. Roman Makarios' chronicle, compiled on behalf of Peter Rareș, covers historical events occurring between 1504 and 1551. Eftimius, abbot of the Căpriana monastery, was asked by Alexandru Lăpușneanu to continue Makarios' work to include the events of the principality between 1541 and 1554. The events of the years 1554-1574 were addressed by the monk Azarius, a disciple of Makarios, by decree of Peter the Lame. The fundamental premise of these 16th century chronicles was the establishment of centralised power in Moldova, as well as emphasis on the continuity between Roman and Greek history and Moldavian history. Azarius was the last representative of the school of court chroniclers.

The Annals of Moldova illuminate the period from the 14th through the 18th centuries. They describe the activities and achievements of various princes and monasteries, the chief proponents of Christian culture of the time. From the 17th century, the chronicles began to be written in the Romanian language. The best known chroniclers are Grigore Ureche (1590s-1647), Miron Costin (1633 -1691), Ion Neculce (1672-1745).

Moldovan historiography rose to the levels of contemporary European science in the works of Dimitrie Cantemir (1673-1723). Dimitrie Cantemir was the author of one of the most complete histories of the Turks. His History of the Growth and Decay of the Ottoman Empire (1714) was translated into many European languages. A valuable historical, ethnographic and geographic source is his Description of Moldova (1716).

=== Modern Era ===
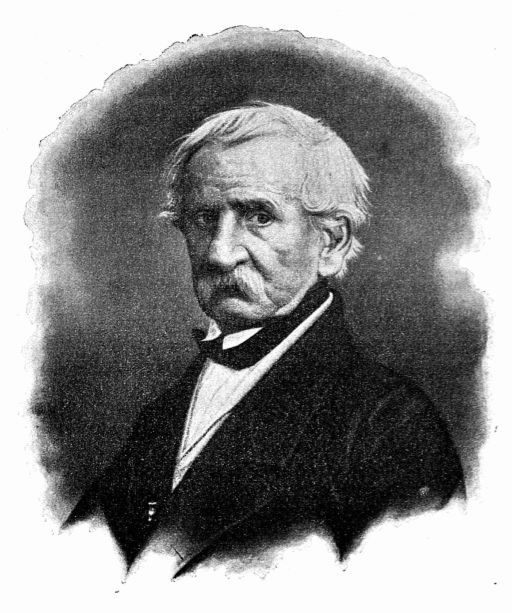
Gheorghe Asachi

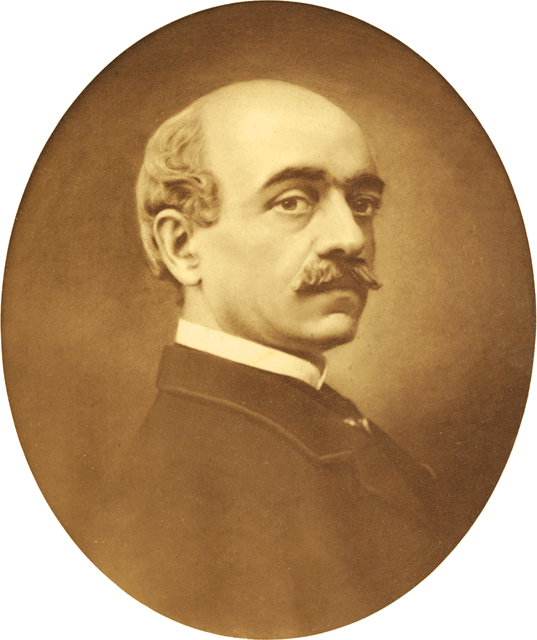
Vasile Alecsandri

Only at the end of the 17th and early 18th centuries did a secular literature develop in Moldova. The so-called Transylvanian school promoted the idea of a Romance origin for the Romanian people and their language, an idea that propelled their nationalistic development from the end of the 17th century. This 'Latinate' school included Samuil Micu-Klein (1745-1808), Gheorghe Şincai (1754-1816), Petru Maior (c.1756-1821). In 1780, Samuil Micu-Klein's grammar Elements of Dacio-Romanian Language in Latin was published, while other scientific and historical works include Şincai's Chronicle of the Romanians and other peoples (on which he worked for over thirty years, and which was published posthumously), and Maior's History of the early Romanians in Dacia (1812) and A Conversation on the Beginnings of the Romanian Language between an Uncle and a Nephew (1819).

Alexandru Beldiman (1832-1898) wrote the chronicle Tragodia sau mai bine a zice jalnica Moldovei întâmplare după răzvrătirea grecilor, a tale of social upheaval during a peasant uprising in 1821 against the boyar landlords. Much of the storytelling of the first half of the 19th century reflected the social struggle between the poor peasantry and the landowning classes in Moldova and Wallachia. Songs celebrating the Hajduk appeared at this time. Bourgeouis literature of the period painted a villainous picture of the hajduks, but in folks songs they were romanticised as heroes and champions of peasant rights. The Moldavian national musical style Doina circulated widely.

Among the founders of Moldavian lyric poetry are the father Ienăchiță Văcărescu and son Alecu Văcărescu. They both wrote love songs in the tradition of the ancient Greek poet Anacreon, an extant example being Amărâta turturea ("The Moping Dove").

At the beginning of the 19th century, the writers Gheorghe Asachi (founder of the first Moldovan newspaper Romanian Bee in 1829), Alecu Donici, Alecu Russo, Constantin Stamati, Bogdan Petriceicu Hasdeu and Mihail Kogălniceanu become famous.

Kogălniceanu published the journal Dacia Literară (Literary Dacia), as well as the historical journal Arhiva Românească in 1840. Along with Vasile Alecsandri and Constantin Negruzzi he published the literary journal Revival, which was soon thereafter closed down by the censors.

Negruzzi can be considered the founder of modern Moldovan prose. He was active in the peasant uprising of 1821, fled to Bessarabia where he met, and was subsequently deeply influenced by, Alexander Pushkin.

In the second half of the 19th century, Moldovan literature fell under the influence of the middle-class, especially of the French. Latinate influences rising in Transylvania had a considerable following in Moldova and Wallachia. Another source of influence on Moldovan literature was that of the Germans.

The noted poet and dramaturge Vasile Alecsandri was active in the national movement for the unification of Moldova and Wallachia, participating in the revolution of 1848, headed the magazines Progress, Literary Dacia, and founded the journal Literary Romania. In 1888, Elena Sevastos published the collection Cantece Moldovenesti (Moldovan songs). Nationalism, aestheticism, and the idealisation of folk art characterised the folklore collections of the time. The critic and politician Titu Maiorescu, on the other hand, was representative of a countervailing conservative strand in the arts. Bogdan Petriceicu Hasdeu, the editor of the gazette Trojan and the satirical journal Cerienok was very popular. Critics noted that in the trans-Prut Moldova and other provinces of Romania, there was beginning a Francophone Romanian culture. At the same time, the 19th century is notable for the establishment of a nationalist literature as well.

=== Moldavian Autonomous Soviet Socialist Republic ===
From 1926, the newspaper Plugarul Roșu (Red Ploughman) published in Tiraspol, followed by Pagini literară (Literary pages), and then organised by May 1, 1927, into the journal Moldova literară, occupied an important corner of Moldovan literature. In April 1927 was organised the Union of Moldovan Soviet Writers (Reseritul, or Sunrise), with Mozes Kahana as its first chairman. At the end of 1931, the writers' union in Tiraspol divided two sections: Tinerimea and Ularf. In November, the journal Moldova literară reorganised itself into a politico-literary monthly October - an organ for the Union of Writers and the Socio-literary division of the Moldovan scientific committee. From 1930, the pioneering magazine (Leninist Spark) began publication.

Dmitrii Milev can be considered the first Soviet writer from the Moldovan Autonomous SSR. In his short stories, Milev described in bright detail the bestiality and terror of Romanian fascism in a Bessarabian village, and the protest and resistance of the peasantry. But Milev also depicted the Bessarabian farmers as an undifferentiated mass that propels individual heroes. The revolutionary movement was shown as spontaneous and without perspective. Some of his works were to some extent or the other pessimistic, albeit veiled.

Mihai Andriescu, born in a peasant family in Bessarabia, was a Communist poet, among whose works were Navalire, and Grigore Malini.

Teodor Malai, also born in Bessarabia, was a farm-hand, fought in the Civil War, organiser of collective farms, a senior member of the Communist party. He published a collection of poems, Oţelu jiu in 1929. His oeuvre covered the October Revolution, the dictatorship of the proletariat, class struggle, the problems of the establishment of Socialism, the defence of the USSR, and life in the Party and the Komsomol.

One of the most energetic drivers of the Moldovan Soviet literature was Samuil Lehtţir, an organiser of the Union of Moldovan Soviet Writers and a founder of the literary journal Moldova literară. In his early poems (for instance, Poems (1929)) he often imitated the folk style (Doina), in which he attempted to show the revolutionary movements in Bessarabia. Between 1928 and 1929, he wrote essays of criticism. His collection of poems În flăcări (In the flame) came out in 1931, revealing considerable artistic and ideological development. His poetry collection Nikita depicted class struggle in the collective farm. Caderea Epigonilor (The Fall of the Epigones) demonstrates his introduction into socialist realism. To Lehtţir is also attributed the beginning of Moldovan dramaturgy. His play Codreanu (1930) depicts moments in the revolution and rebellion of serfs under the leadership of a hajduk.

Mozes Kahana, born in Gyergyóbékás, Austria-Hungary (now in Romania), was the first chairman of the Moldovan Writers' Union. He was involved in the Proletkult movement and published poetry and essays in various Soviet journals. He also contributed to the development of Esperanto language in Moldova and the rest of the USSR.

The works of the poet Caftanaki should be noted: the short story Cabanita, the poems Donbasul Alb (White Donbass), Greiler Elevator, Fuljeraria (Snowstorm).

Eminent among the Moldavian writers of the period is Markov, whose major works are Ce a cost, nu a mai fi (So it was, but so it shall not be), Lupta (Struggle), the short story collection For Soviet Rule (1930), the poetry collection Cuvintul viu (1930), The Black Valley and others.

The poet Leonid Corneanu (1909-1957) is well known for his Tiraspolul (1932), which gives a vivid picture of the Moldovan capital, its perspectives and grand buildings, as well as his extensive collections of Moldovan folk songs (Cântece norodnice moldoveneşti (1939)). His works were intimately tied to the realities of those times and could be seen as chronicle of the era. Corneanu also played a major role in the creation of a Moldovan children's literature (Pionierii în ţeh, 1934).

The novelist Ion Canna (1902-1979) published in Moldova literară: the satirical story Râşniţa (1926) as well as stories set during the Civil War, the building of Socialism in the countryside, the collectivisation of agriculture. In 1937 came his Două întâlniri (Two meetings), which was distinguished by the diversity of themes, descriptions of the new people and a sharp and expressive language. Canna was later to face disgrace and lose his honour as the founder of Soviet Moldovan literature - for plagiarism.

Among other prominent writers was D. Batrânsea (Mai sus făclia ardă).

=== Bessarabia ===
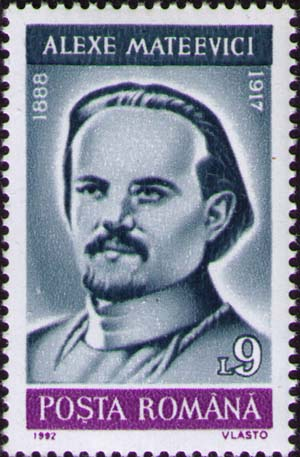
Alexei Mateevici

Alexei Mateevici (1888-1917) was one of the foremost Bessarabian poets: his poems Limba noastră (Our language), Ţăranii (Peasants), Eu cânt (I sing), Ţara (The Country) being particularly notable.

The participants of the underground revolutionary movement and the anti-fascist struggle in Bessarabia were the writers Emilian Bukov (1909-1984) and Andrei Lupan (1912–92). Among Bukov's interesting collections of poetry are "This Sun" (1937) and "China" (1938). This period is the beginning of the literary work of other writers: George Meniuc (1918–87), Bogdan Istru (1914-1993), T. Nencheva (1913–41), Liviu Deleanu (1911–67), Nicolai Costenco (1913–93 ), A. Robota (1916–41), G. Adam (1914–46), Vera Panfil (1905–61), Sergiu Grossu (1920–2009), D. Vetrov (1913–52), and others.

The creation of Greater Romania brought late Symbolism into Bessarabia, stimulating the Bessarabian literary scene. A generation of Romanian-speaking Bessarabian poets embraced Symbolism, in some cases with influences from other forms of modern writing. Particularly relevant in this context, George Meniuc embraced Symbolist poetry before moving toward Romanian traditionalism. The proliferation of Bessarabian Symbolism, often alongside Expressionism, was encouraged by several literary magazines—a leading presence among them was Viața Basarabiei, which officially claimed to be a neo-Sămănătorist publication, followed by Bugeacul, Poetul and Itinerar. The Symbolist school's representatives in that region were a diverse gathering. Meniuc's way of merging traditionalism with Symbolism and other currents was notably followed by Nicolai Costenco or Alexandru Robot. Other authors in this succession are Sergiu Grossu, Bogdan Istru, Teodor Nencev, Eugenio Coșeriu, Liviu Deleanu and Magda Isanos.

There was a brief spark of Gagauz literature in the 1920s and 1930s in Bessarabia, the single-handed work of a priest Mihail Ciachir (1861-1938), who created the first Gagauz dictionary, grammar, and translated religious works into the language.

=== Moldavian Soviet Socialist Republic ===
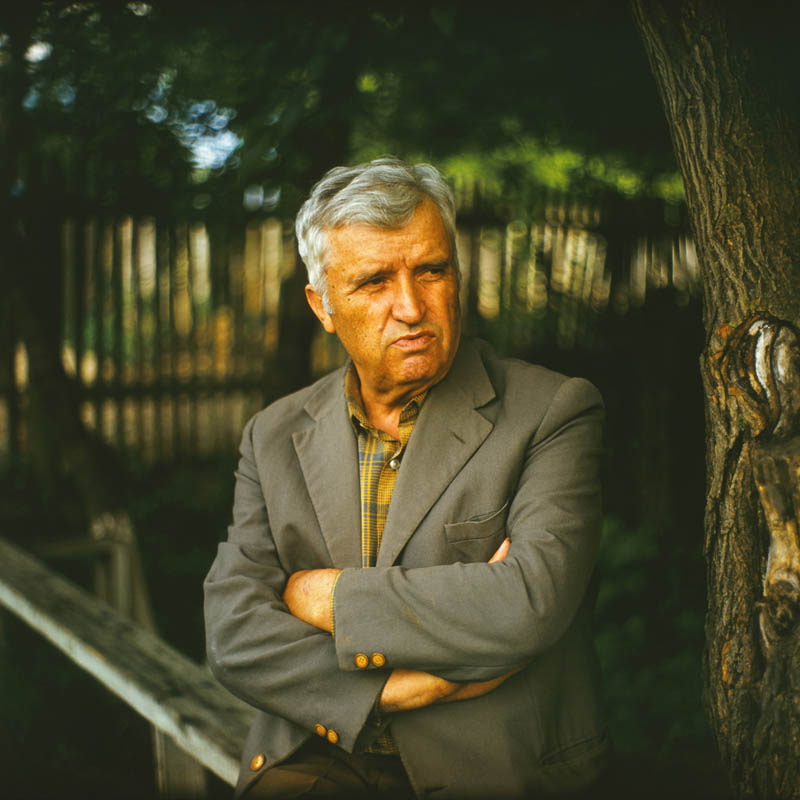
Andrei Lupan

During World War II, several Moldavian authors served in the Soviet Army: Samson Şleahu (1915-1993), Alexandru Lipcan (1908-1977), Lev Barskii (1909-1974). Poetry and journalism flourished. Poems and articles of Emilian Bukov, Bogdan Istru, Andrei Lupan, Liviu Deleanu and George Meniuc were published in the magazine Moldova Socialistă (Moscow, 1942-44), in central gazettes and journals, as well as being broadcast over the radio. Russian translations of Bukov's I see you, Moldavia (1942) and Spring on the Dniester (1944) were published in Moscow.

The post-war period was fruitful for the development of all genres of literature. Bukov gained fame for several children's books: Andrieş (1946), De vorbă cu cei mici (Speaking to children, 1953), Basm cu cele patru zâne (Story of four banshees, 1972). Other epic works include Lupan's The Forgotten Village (1940) and Face to Face (1945), Istru's Pogorna (1947) and Spring in the Carpathians (1955), Meniuc's Song of the Dawn (1948), Deleanu's Immortal Youth (1950), Kruchenyuk's Mother's Word (1952), which reflected the fight against the Nazi invaders, the collectivization of agriculture in the country, and the struggle for peace. These years also saw the flowering of the poets Iosif Balţan (1923-1975), Constantin Condrea (1920-2009), Petru Zadnipru (1927-1976), Anatol Gujel (1922- ).

Critically and popularly acclaimed works included: Ion Druță's Leaves of Sorrow (1957), Vladimir Beşleagă's Zbor frânt (Broken flight, 1966), Ariadna Shalar's People and Destinies (1958).

The genres of essays and short stories were successfully developed by the above writers as well as Vasile Vasilache, A. Marinat, R. Lunghu.

Dramaturgy was an important development in Soviet Moldavia. Works such as Lupan's Light (1948), Bukov's The Raging Danube (1957), Anna Lupan's The Wheel of Time (1959), Rahmil Portnoi's Flightless Birds (1957), Corneanu's The Bitterness of Love (1958), Condrea's Children and Apples (1961) and Druță's Birds of Our Youth (1972) are prominent.

In the 1960s and 1970s appeared fine novels and poetry: Druță's novel Ballads of the Steppes (1963), Bukov's collection of poems Present day, future day (1965), Lupan's Laws of Hospitality (1966), L. Damian's Roots (1966), Victor Teleucă's Deer Island (1966), and Grigore Vieru's Poems (1965).

There was also an important tradition of translation into the Moldovan language of works in Russian and masterpieces of other world languages. Eminent translators included Alexandru Cosmescu (1922-1989), Yuri Barzhansky (1922-1986), P. Starostin, I. Crețu and others.

Russian language writers in Moldavia included the novelists L. Mischenko, G. Uspensky, and the poets N. Savostin, B. Marian, V. Izmailov, S. Burlak, Vadim Chirkov. There were also works in the Gagauz language by Dmitri Kara-Çoban (1933-1986) and Dionis Tanasoglu (1922-2006).

=== Modern Moldova ===
Since independence, Moldova has continued its literary tradition across genres. Vasile Gârneţ is in the vanguard of the experimental novel (Martorul, 1988), and Grigore Chiper writes consciously fragmentary quotidian prose.

Nicolae Popa's Avionul mirosea a pește (The Plane Smells Of Fish, 2008) is a postmodern novel that symbolises the peacefulness of his people despite the hardships thrown by history. Dumitru Crudu's Măcel în Georgia (Massacre in Georgia, 2008) is an ironic reflection on the essential unchanging nature of his country, whether Soviet or independent.

Emilian Galaicu-Păun (Air with Diamonds) is a contemporary poet called eloquent, assured, politically engaged.

The Gagauz language enjoyed a resurgence in the independent republic of Moldova. A weekly newspaper Ana Sözü (Mother tongue) began publication in 1988, and a Gagauz university opened in Comrat in 1991.

== Politics and Controversy ==
Throughout the existence of the Moldovan ASSR and the Moldovan SSR, there was a fierce battle between the so-called Moldovenists and the Romanianists, a schism caused by their attitude towards the linguistic identity of Moldovan - was it a separate language with its own tradition, or was it a derivative of the Romanian literary norm? The battle was fought in the Union of Moldovan Soviet Writers, resulting in several splits and reformations. In the late 1940s, further political manoeuvring was caused by the absorption of Bessarabian writers into the Union, where they were in conflict with the Transnistrians. As a result of the post-Stalin thaw, the Bessarabians were able to impose a Romanian version of the Moldovan language, with the sole exception being the script of the latter, which continued to be Cyrillic.

After independence, the modern Moldovan republic switched its script back to Latin.

At the same time, there was considerable Russophobia which was reflected in the works of such poets as Petru Cărare (Unwelcome Visitor) and Grigore Vieru, which promoted nationalism among ethnic Moldovans at the cost of the Russian-speaking minority.
