= Viața Basarabiei =

Romanian-language periodical based in Chișinău, Moldova

Viaţa Basarabiei
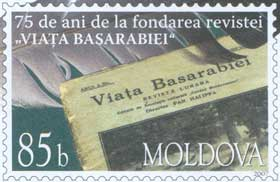
- Viaţa Basarabiei on a 2007 Moldovan stamp
- Editor: Mihai Cimpoi
- Categories: literary magazine, political magazine
- First issue: January 1932
- Company: Prut Internaţional
- Country: Romania, Moldova
- Language: Romanian

Viaţa Basarabiei (Romanian for "Bessarabia's Life", pronounced [ˈvjat͡sa basaˈrabi.ej]) is a Romanian-language periodical from Chişinău, Moldova. Originally a literary and political magazine, published at a time when the Bessarabia region was part of Romania, it was founded in 1932 by political activist Pan Halippa and writer Nicolai Costenco. At the time, Viaţa Basarabiei was primarily noted for rejecting the centralism of Greater Romanian governments, to which they opposed more or less vocal Bessarabian regionalist demands and a nativist ethos.

Declaring itself to be a traditionalist venue, interested in preserving local specificity in the cultural field, Viaţa Basarabiei was in effect a voice for cultural innovation and a host to modernist writers such as Vladimir Cavarnali, Bogdan Istru or George Meniuc. After the Soviet Union's 1940 annexation of Bessarabia, the editorial board split, and Halippa revived the magazine at a new location in Bucharest. It was published there for most of World War II, and was eventually disestablished. Its editors were subject to persecution in both Soviet territory and Communist Romania. The magazine was revived in 2002 by Mihai Cimpoi, being printed under the auspices of both the Romanian Writers' Union and the Moldovan Writers' Union.

== History ==
=== Creation ===
Viaţa Basarabiei, founded as the literary voice of Bessarabian regionalism, was first printed in January 1932. Its first issue included a foreword by Halippa, in which the latter, previously a key figure in the 1918 union with Romania and activist of the National Moldavian Party, outlined and pledged to follow a set of political and cultural ideals. The name adopted by Halippa's publication was homonymous with that of two other press organs: a newspaper published in 1907; and a daily of the National Peasants' Party, published from 1930 to 1944. The name was also equivalent in translation to those of non-Romanian Bessarabian papers: the Russian-language Besarabskaya Zhizn' (published around 1917) and the Yiddish Dos Besaraber Lebn (1918-1940).

The new magazine was, according to Romanian literary critic Ion Simuţ, a "regional adaptation" of the Moldavian-based journal Viaţa Românească. According to Moldovan writer and researcher Călina Trifan, the connection between these two platforms was the theory of "national specificity" in Romanian culture, first elaborated by Viaţa Românească before World War I, and resurrected into an "evidently regionalist" ideology by Halippa and Costenco (see Poporanism). Himself a member of the Viaţa Românească circles, Romanian literary historian George Călinescu spoke of Viaţa Basarabiei and other cultural platforms of the day as proofs that Bessarabia manifested "great interest in literature." The popularization of literature in the 1930s, Călinescu noted, meant that "even the hospitalized people of the sanitarium in Bugaz had their own [literary periodical]".

=== Regionalist agenda ===
The localist point of view was a common feature of other Bessarabian periodicals during the interwar period (Cuget Moldovenesc, Bugeacul, Poetul, Itinerar). However, Viaţa Basarabiei's anti-centralist political bias, evident after Nicolai Costenco's arrival as managing editor (1934), was described by various researchers as proof of extremism, bordering on Moldovenism and anti-Romanian sentiment. Simuţ writes: "During the '30s, N. Costenco was promoting an exclusive and aggressive, hardly imaginable form of regionalism [...]. [His was] the most dangerous political way of thinking for the Bessarabian 'nation', whose logic leads into euphoric isolationism, that is to say a form of enclavization, [...] an aberrant form of defense." According to scholar Alexandru Burlacu, Costenco was an "ideologist of nativism pushed to the point of absurdity". Moldovan essayist and critic Eugen Lungu, who suggested that such reactions may be traced back to a "parochial complex", also noted of Costenco: "He promoted [by means of Viaţa Basarabiei] a ferocious nativism, sometimes to the point of degenerating into anti-Romanianism. An animator and aesthete of cultural regionalism, convinced in his romantic frenzy of an ultraspecial genius of 'the populace', he exulted a rambunctious messianism of Slavic inspiration." By then, Costenco and some of his fellow contributors to the magazine also had leftist sympathies, making them critics of the right-wing trends in Greater Romanian politics.

In his column pieces for the magazine, Costenco repeatedly stipulated the existence of a Bessarabian ethnicity, displaying "spiritual superiority" when compared to Romanians, and suggested that all of Greater Romania's historical regions had "particular, exclusive national consciousnesses". Another one of his ideas, outlined in ideological articles such as the 1937 piece Necesitatea regionalismului cultural ("The Need for a Cultural Regionalism"), was that Romanian immigrants into Bessarabia, or venetici ("newcomers"), were to locals what sparrows are to nightingales. Costenco also argued that the area's history as a part of the Russian Empire, and its consequent familiarity with Russian culture, were marks of both dissimilarity and excellence: "The culture of those who can speak Russian is overwhelmingly superior in its august silence, when compared with the old kingdom's culture, with its chatty and insolent representatives. [...] By combining [the] two cultures, the Slavic and... the Latin one, tomorrow's Bessarabia shall become, from a spiritual point of view, a chain of mountains, the tops of which will be glowing in full splendor over the times and borders."

Costenco's stance mirrored the attitudes of some other Viaţa Basarabiei contributors. The magazine published some of the last political texts by the old anarchist Zamfir Arbore, who stated his bitter rejection of Romanian society. Although a lifelong supporter of unionism, the Romanian Orthodox priest and writer Vasile Ţepordei, who was a regular contributor to Viaţa Basarabiei and other regional reviews, spoke of Romania having treated Bessarabia as an "African colony", creating opportunities for "adventurers" and "nonentities" from the other historical regions. Halippa's own pronouncements of the period expressed his disappointment with centralist policies, leading to accusations that he himself had become anti-Romanian.

Various commentators have noted that Viaţa Basarabiei partly shaped the negative perception of Romanian authorities, as embraced by many locals. Literary critic Dan Mănucă notes that this cultural and political phenomenon, later exacerbated by Soviet historiography, was in fact also an answer to the Romanian government's assignment of incompetent officials at a local level. However, Moldovan philologist Alina Ciobanu-Tofan notes, there was a separation between "the provocative statements" made by Viaţa Basarabiei editors and actual interwar accomplishments: "cultural regionalism has stood as the fundamental prerequisite in maintaining the Bessarabian spiritual phenomenon afloat, it being the only way for accomplishing the actual unification of Romanian spirituality, the synthesis of all creative contributions". The regionalist platform continued to tolerate contributions from Romanian men of letters who did not identify with such policies. One such case was that of Constantin Ciopraga, a literary critic who made his debut in the magazine's pages, and who, according to Mănucă, was most likely interested in "supporting Romanianism in the land between the Prut and the Dniester [that is, Bessarabia]."

=== Traditionalism and modernism ===
Stylistically, Nicolai Costenco's review was generally committed to the traditionalist and anti-modernist side of the Romanian literary environment. In articles for the magazine, Costenco offered praise to the publications issued by the nationalist thinker and historian Nicolae Iorga, from the defunct Sămănătorul (the coagulant factor of Romanian traditionalism) to the neo-Sămănătorist Cuget Clar. The Bessarabian journalist merged his rejection of Romanian modernism into his discourse on the regional issue, arguing: "We, as Bessarabians, are pleased that the Bessarabian folk is impervious to the poisoned heat radiating from present-day Romanian culture." According to Burlacu, the use of traditionalist rhetoric is also observable in those articles which speak of Bessarabia's identity, in the magazine's critique of modernist poet Tudor Arghezi, and in poet Sergiu Matei Nica's Orthodox statements of devotion.

In practice, Viaţa Basarabiei was more open to modernism than its editorial policies dictated. The paradox was underlined by Burlacu, who noted that Costenco himself was beginning to incorporate poetic traits from Symbolism, a literary form that Iorga had equated with sickness. The magazine therefore played host to Bogdan Istru, George Meniuc and other writers who illustrated the final developments of Romania's Symbolist movement, and whose work also adopted some avant-garde characteristics. After 1935, Viaţa Basarabiei employed as a member of the editorial staff the modernist poet and communist sympathizer Alexandru Robot, whose articles covered such political issues as the trial of Romanian Communist Party member Petre Constantinescu-Iaşi.

Writing for the magazine, Costenco himself offered much praise to the lyrical work of Vladimir Cavarnali, whose style was by then incorporating influences from Russian Symbolism, Expressionism or Futurism over a generic Symbolist framework. One of Costenco's essays, published by Viaţa Basarabiei in 1937, stated: "the poet is a hero, a titan—the multitudes should follow him, so that, once in communion with his songs, they may build themselves a future without any lies". The critic encouraged Cavarnali to pursue this tendency, in order to provide his readers with "the Great Poem of the native, Bessarabian, soul". Costenco was also a promoter of Robot's Somnul singurătăţii ("The Slumber of Solitude", 1936)—an avant-garde volume which he positively reviewed for Viaţa Basarabiei.

In 1939, George Meniuc used Viaţa Basarabiei to express his thoughts about the similarity between the condition of a poet and that of a shipwreck victim: "The creative soul, tormented in so many ways, finds itself in continuous disorientation. Creation is merely the [...] proof of one's search for support, search for certitudes". He argued in favor of a poetry that based itself primarily on musicality, and, aligning himself with Symbolist and Expressionist principles, urged poets to seek inspiration in both "the starlit sky" and "the dumpster". Also published in Viaţa Basarabiei, Meniuc's review of Cavarnali's 1939 volume Răsadul verde al inimii stelele de sus îl plouă ("The Heart's Green Seedbed Is Rained upon by the Stars Above") expressed an enthusiasm similar to Costenco's. Meniuc argued that Cavarnali had foreseen the arrival of a new age, "perhaps the new Middle Ages", adding: "the arrival of this new epoch is seen by [Cavarnali] as ruin, devastation. The modern city [...] scares him. Everything that is not in touch with the primitive life of yesteryear is inscribed within the prosaic sign of mechanicism. This new rumor casts darkness over his rest and his reverie".

=== Pre-1940 cultural impact ===
Overall, the magazine was involved in promoting new voices on the Bessarabian literary scene, and had in all 120 individual contributors. Reportedly, there were 1,035 separate poems published by the journal between 1932 and 1944. In addition to the poems of Cavarnali, Costenco, Meniuc and Nica, it included, as milestones in Bessarabian poetry, Olga Cruşevan's "blue poetry", Lotis Dolenga's nostalgic pieces, as well as patriotic-themed works by Halippa and Sergiu Grossu. Other noted works hosted by Viaţa Basarabiei were the prose writings of Dubăsari native Dominte Timonu. Having had his work reviewed by Sergiu Matei Nica in a 1937 issue, Timonu was featured with the novellas Fiica domnului primar, ("Mr. Mayor's Daughter"), La comisariat ("At the Commissioner's Office"), Lalea ("A Tulip"), Albăstrele ("The Bullweed Flowers") and Un pictor de peisaje ("A Landscape Painter"), printed in various issues between 1937 and 1942. Other modernist or traditionalist poetry and prose authors who contributed to the Bessarabian review were: Ion Buzdugan, Radu Gyr, Teodor Nencev, Liuba Dumitriu, Sergiu Grossu, Nicolae Spătaru, Petru Ştefănucă, Vasile Luţcan, Octav Sargeţiu, Anton Luţcan, Iacov Slavov, Andrei Tibereanu, Magda Isanos and Alexandru Lungu.

According to Alina Ciobanu-Tofan, "for 13 years, [Viaţa Basarabiei] has had a fruitful activity (without equivalent in its epoch) in the area of Romanian culture in Bessarabia, discovering talents, generating and propagating unprecedented values". She notes that the progresses registered by Halippa and Costenco's tribune, "the most prestigious publication in 1930s Bessarabia", were significant in a context were the "blood-stained prints" of 19th century Russification were still observable.

Beyond its literary agenda, Viaţa Basarabiei had a role in circulating academic studies on various subjects. According to one author's assessment, it published, before 1944: "3,232 articles, sources, reviews, information pieces on the most recent problems of Romanian language and literature, the history of the Romanians, philosophy, psychology, Christian ethics, sociology, statecraft and law, economy, natural sciences, agriculture, education, arts etc." Among the noted social scientists who contributed to Viaţa Basarabiei at the time were Halippa himself, Zamfir Arbore, Vasile Harea, Gheorghe V. Madan and Liviu Marian.

In addition to chronicling Bessarabian and nationwide developments, Viaţa Basarabiei was interested in the life of Romanian-speakers within the Soviet Union, particularly those in the neighboring Moldavian ASSR (Transnistria), where, due to permanent border tensions, cultural contacts had been much reduced. The journal's 1933 notice on the literary life of Transnistria, at a time when the region was being reshaped by Marxism-Leninism, interested Romanian novelist and journalist Liviu Rebreanu, who then published ample but partly erroneous deductions about the number of Romanian writers there.

=== World War II, communism and disestablishment ===
After Bessarabia's annexation by the Soviets in 1940, Viaţa Basarabiei ceased its publication, only to resurface a year later in Bucharest, the Romanian capital. It was published there throughout the Ion Antonescu regime's participation in the Axis-led war on the Soviet Union (see Romania during World War II). The paper continued featuring articles endorsing Romania's participation in the war, and making negative assessments about the impact of Imperial Russian and Soviet rule. It notably featured articles by the senior Bessarabian politician Ion Pelivan, who argued: "The Russians have plundered, robbed, humiliated us [Bessarabian Romanians], defiled our spirit, destroyed our language, stole our land, colonized it with other plundering populations, and they have murdered our Romanian being". Pelivan's essay reflected on the impact of Russification and its conflict with unionism, all the way back to the Crimean War.

Before and after the Axis invasion, Viaţa Basarabiei's legacy in the newly created Moldavian SSR (covering most of Bessarabia) was contested by local Soviet officials. The successive deportations to the Gulag affected several former affiliates of the magazine, including Costenco (who had chosen to remain behind after the 1940 occupation) and Vasile Ţepordei. Having stayed behind in Soviet territory after 1940, Alexandru Robot adopted the tenets of Socialist Realism and mysteriously disappeared shortly after the Axis attack. His praise of Soviet power, concentrated in lyrical pieces such as A înflorit Moldova ("Moldova Has Blossomed"), is believed by researcher Iurie Colesnic to have masked his secret disappointment with the Soviet regime. In what has been described as a highly unusual occurrence, Robot had continued to publish articles in Viaţa Basarabiei between its relocation to Bucharest and the outbreak of war.

Discussing the manner in which the Soviet takeover had effected both cultural separation and the promotion of Moldovenism, Ion Simuţ writes about the ensuing paradoxes: "N. Costenco would become a victim of this blockage, enduring 15 years of [Soviet] detention specifically because of his earlier 'nationalism'. His exclusive and rigid regionalism of the '30s was one thing, and Moldovan Sovietism of the Stalinist years quite another. Still, they had many things in common, among which dogmatism, an anti-Romanian attitude and a cultural disaster were the most important." Lungu, who writes about Costenco's failed attempts at reaching a compromise with the Soviet authorities, finds that the Bessarabian author came to reconsider his stance on regionalism, during and after his time in Soviet camps. Halippa had a special situation: a political prisoner of the Romanian communist regime, he was also handed out to the Soviets and sent to the Gulag, and then again held in Romanian custody. A committed devotee to the cause of unionism, he refused proposals to resettle in the Moldavian SSR, and spent his final years in Romania.

The identification of the regionalist venue with nationalism and fascism, centered on allegations about Halippa and Meniuc's wartime attitudes, was notably argued by communist poet Emilian Bucov. In a 1959 address to the Communist Party of the Moldavian SSR, he suggested that Meniuc's renewed literary activity in Soviet territory posed a political threat: "Some of our writers, for example G. Meniuc, have begun to raise up, like some sort of banners, the shreds of some reactionary magazines that used to be printed in Romania and Bessarabia up to 1940 and during the latest war, Viaţa Basarabiei or Gândirea. Why should we now extend amnesty to these reactionary magazines [...]? After all, all Bessarabian people know that Viaţa Basarabiei magazine has been promoting a shameless campaign, riddled with lies and innuendo, against the Land of the Soviets, against the revolutionary communist movement in Bessarabia." Meniuc, who faced these and other political charges, was removed from his editorial offices upon the end of the investigation.

=== 2002 revival ===
The status of Romanian literature in the Moldavian SSR was elevated during the late 1980s, when democratization became official policy. The transition was signaled by Nistru, the official literary magazine. It anthologized the work of classical Romanian authors, changed its name to Basarabia and, shortly before the Soviet collapse, declared itself a successor of Viaţa Basarabiei.

Viaţa Basarabiei was revived under its own title a decade into Moldovan independence. The new series entered print in 2002, under the direction of literary historian and politician Mihai Cimpoi, and placed under the patronage of both the Romanian Writers' Union and the Moldovan Writers' Union. This custody was also shared by the Moldovan Writers' Union with the Romanian Cultural Institute.

Its creation followed a split within the editorial board of Basarabia journal: Cimpoi and part of the editorial staff voted in favor of the transformation, while poet Nicolae Popa contested the decision and continued to publish Basarabia as a separate periodical. As of 2003, Prut Internaţional publishing company manages the publication process.

The first issues listed as the editorial staff writers from Moldova (Alexandru Burlacu, Emilian Galaicu-Păun, Ion Hadârcă, Dumitru-Dan Maxim) and Romania (Ana Blandiana, Constantin Ciopraga, Victor Crăciun, Eugen Simion). Other noted contributors were Romanian critic Eugen Uricaru, Bessarabian-born novelist Paul Goma (who serialized here his narrative, also titled Basarabia), and Moldovan author Andrei Strâmbeanu. The magazine was also noted for publishing posthumous works by authors from several cultures, among them Marin Preda and Konstantin Paustovsky.

Popa's Basarabia did not survive as the market and culture changed. The rival magazine also faced several problems, including irregular circulation. According to a December 2005 article by cultural journalist Larisa Ungureanu, Viaţa Basarabiei only put out eleven issues over three years, none of which had been published during that particular year. She also notes that Cimpoi's paper, like all other Moldovan literary reviews, was largely inaccessible at newsstands in Chişinău and in public libraries all over the country.

Ungureanu also opines that, among this section of the Moldovan media, Viaţa Basarabiei and Literatura şi Arta stand out for their conservative approach to publishing, as opposed to the more modern Contrafort, Revista Sud-Est and Semn. The same dichotomy was stated by writer Maria Şleahtiţchi, according to whom the Moldovan publishing industry is essentially divided between journals with an antiquated patriotic Romanian discourse and venues better adapted to the modern scene. Writing for Revista Sud-Est, poet and novelist Leo Butnaru criticized Cimpoi and Viaţa Basarabiei for not maintaining the same editorial standard as Semn or Contrafort: "is it not symptomatic [...] that, even in the very first issue of Viaţa Basarabiei, presided upon by an obviously apt literary critic, Mihai Cimpoi, no room could be found for at the very least simple bibliographies, reviews or axiological commentary?"
