= Vladimir Cavarnali =

Romanian writer and political figure (1910–1966)

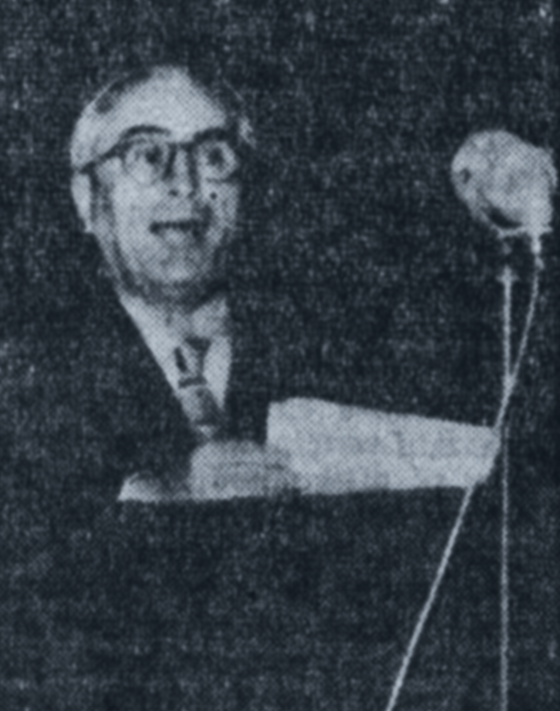
- Cavarnali at the Săptămîna Poeziei festival, October 1963
- Born: 10 August 1910; Bolgrad, Bessarabia Governorate, Russian Empire
- Died: 19 July 1966 (aged 55); Bucharest, Socialist Republic of Romania
- Resting place: Bellu Cemetery
- Occupations: Journalist; editor; schoolteacher; politician
- Writing career
- Period: 1927–1966
- Genres: Lyric poetry; biography; political poetry; children's literature
- Literary movement: Modernist literature; Proletarian literature; Viața Basarabiei; Symbolism; Expressionism; Futurism

Vladimir or Vlad Cavarnali (also known as Cavarnalli or Kavarnali; Bulgarian: Владимир Каварнали; 10 August 1910 – 19 July 1966) was a Bessarabian-born Romanian poet, journalist, editor, and political figure. Though his ethnic background was Bessarabian Bulgarian and Gagauz, he embraced Romanian nationalism and would not approve of separation between the Romanian and Bessarabian literary traditions. In his twenties, he debuted in politics with the National Liberal Party, before switching to the dissident fascist Crusade of Romanianism, and then to the far-right Romanian Front. By contrast, Cavarnali's poetic work was heavily indebted to the influence of Russian Symbolism, and especially to Sergei Yesenin—whose proletarian style he closely mirrored, after removing most of its political connotations. He was also a translator of Russian and more generally Slavic literature, earning praise for his version of Maxim Gorky's Mother.

Though he won the Romanian Royal Foundations' prize in 1934, Cavarnali was a divisive figure—particularly after embracing avant-garde aesthetics in his second (and final) volume, put out in 1939. He was still praised for his work as a cultural animator in his native town of Bolgrad, and especially for the unexpectedly high standards of his own literary journal, Moldavia. His career there was cut short by the Soviet Union's invasion of Bessarabia; Cavarnali may have spent the years 1940–1941 in dire conditions at Chișinău, and was apparently rescued when Bessarabia was retaken by Romania. He and his younger sister Ecaterina, herself a poet, eventually moved to Bucharest. As the war progressed, Cavarnali embraced left-wing and pro-Soviet views, and was eventually recovered as a poet and translator by the Soviet occupation forces, the Union of Communist Youth, and the Writers' Union of Romania; he was also an author and promoter of children's literature. The Romanian communist regime employed Cavarnali as a magazine editor and civil servant, but excluded him from the Workers' Party upon an ideological review in March 1950. He died in relative obscurity at the age of 55, and was survived by Ecaterina, wife of the communist playwright Mihail Davidoglu.

== Biography ==
=== Early life and debut ===
Cavarnali was born a subject of the Russian Empire on 10 August 1910, in Bolgrad. This town was then in Izmailsky Uyezd, Bessarabia Governorate; the entire area, colloquially known as the Budjak and southern Bessarabia, is now included in Ukraine. Cavarnali, the son of Hristofor and Varvara, is generally seen as a member of the local Bulgarian community; researchers Eleonora Hotineanu and Anatol Măcriș note that he was of mixed Bulgarian–Gagauz ethnicity, with Măcriș including him on a list of "Gagauz diaspora in Bessarabia". The surname he and his family used is a variant of the Gagauzian Kavarnalı, meaning "Kavarnian". As noted by the literary scholar George Călinescu, various of Cavarnali's poems attest to his "Slavic" origin, calling Romania "my new motherland"; such pieces also suggest that his father was a farrier who owned a specialized shop. Bolgrad and the rest of Bessarabia were indeed only united with Romania in 1918, when Cavarnali was aged 7 (his sister, Ecaterina, was born that same year). Vladimir also had a brother, Nicolae, who went on to serve in the Romanian Land Forces.

In a 1936 article, Vladimir took pride in noting that, unlike the old Bessarabian elites, he had not been educated by the Tsarist autocracy. His cultural formation in Greater Romania was a "wall [which] separates us, as hostile neighbors". Cavarnali studied locally, graduating from the Bolgrad lyceum; during the graduation ceremony of July 1927 (when he was still in grade seven of eight), he recited two of his own poems. He then attended the University of Bucharest (1928–1931), taking a degree in philosophy and letters (1932). Cavarnali returned to the Budjak as a schoolteacher, first at Chilia (to 1933), and then at Bolgrad (to June 1940). Reportedly, he became a published poet in 1928, when his work was first featured in Romanian periodicals. In February 1934, he and Matei Alexandrescu established the "intellectual group" Litere ("Letters"), which put out a bimonthly of the same title from its headquarters on Popa Tatu Street 14, Bucharest. Its stated mission was to combat "the anarchy one finds in contemporary literature". Cavarnali was a contributor to Frize, a literary monthly published in Brașov, with poems that are seen by critic Emil Manu as "moderately modernist".

Cavarnali's first collection of verse, titled Poesii ("Poems"), was submitted for review to the Royal Foundations that same year, upon being recommended by novelist Mircea Eliade. It won him the Foundations' special prize for "young unpublished authors", which he shared with Emil Cioran, Eugène Ionesco, Eugen Jebeleanu, Constantin Noica, Horia Stamatu, and Dragoș Vrânceanu. Later in 1934, Poesii appeared as a booklet with Editura Fundațiilor Regale of Bucharest. Among the newspapers which welcomed this contribution was the Bulgarian Romanian Dobrudzhanski Glas, which spoke of "our compatriot Vladimir Cavarnali" as a "gentle and unique talent". His debut was closely followed by that of his sister. A member of Teodor Nencev's literary salon, she appeared in print with poems rated as "beautiful and graceful" by Măcriș.

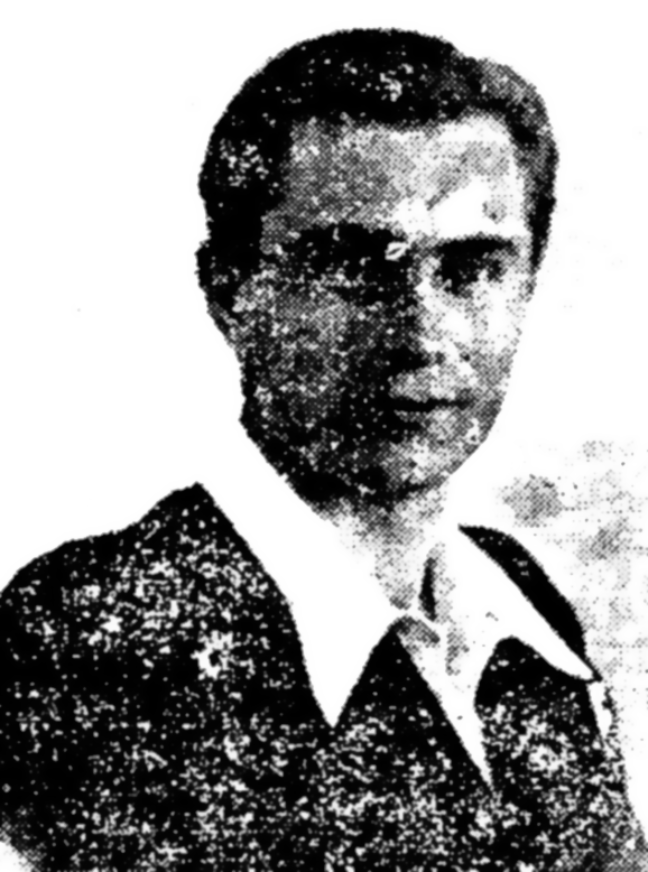
Cavarnali in 1935

Young Cavarnali embarked on a political career with the National Liberal Party (PNL), joining its chapter in Ismail County. On 2 December 1934, he was voted into the PNL county-level political council, which was presided upon by Sergiu Dimitriu. The following year, he joined the editorial staff of Bugeacul, a literary review from his native town. A while afterward, he split with mainstream politics and joined Mihai Stelescu's Crusade of Romanianism—originally a breakaway faction of the far-right Iron Guard, it was established as a more left-leaning, "Social Fascist" party, combining Romanian nationalism with "social aspirations". In May 1935, he had also joined Stelescu and Alexandru Talex's cultural society, which cultivated the memory of Crusade sympathizer Panait Istrati. By January 1936, Cavarnali was working for the Crusade's eponymous magazine as a correspondent in Ismail.

=== Magazine founder and wartime hiatus ===
Cavarnali later served as chairman of the Crusade sections in southern Bessarabia, but quit the party on 10 September 1936, due to ideological disagreements with its new leadership. One of his last contributions for that group's paper was an homage to the left-wing intellectual Constantin Stere, whom Cavarnali described as a victim of a "poisonous, ruinous nationalism", and of attacks mounted by "the illiterate". That same month, Viața Basarabiei published an article of his in which he criticized the regional schisms within Romanian nationalism, detailing the "extremely painful" discovery he and other Bessarabians had made—namely, that intellectuals from the Old Kingdom viewed them as structurally different. By April 1937, Cavarnali had joined another far-right group, the Romanian Front, speaking at its public gathering in Chilia. He had by then returned to Viața Basarabiei with an article which chided young Romanian writers for being more interested in joining the cultural bureaucracy than they were in struggling for literary recognition. After this polemical stance and his Crusader episode, Cavarnali was viewed with contempt by the Iron Guard, whose Buna Vestire daily deplored the absence of any Guardist literary club in Bessarabia. The region, it alleged, had been abandoned: "Mr Pan Halippa and other such quadrupeds lead its literary destinies, with a certain Vladimir Cavarnali, the [homosexual] passion of P. Comarnescu, meddling in like a cretin."

During this interval, Cavarnali's brother mysteriously died at Bolgrad, possibly by suicide or murder. In early 1937, another Bolgrad lyceum professor, Gheorghe Bujoreanu, was putting out the literary magazine Familia Noastră ("Our Family"), which showcased literary pieces by his students. Vladimir Cavarnali took over as its editor later in 1937, continuing for some three years, and was also head of his own magazine, Moldavia, in 1939–1940. The latter project, for which he partnered with Ioan St. Botez, drew acclaim from the Bucharest journal Viața Românească, which noted the "extraordinary phenomenon" of a quality magazine appearing out of a "rusty, sad, filthy town" in the Bessarabian provinces. The same merit was highlighted in Pagini Literare by critic Romulus Demetrescu, who noted that Cavarnali was producing poetry and journalism in a town "beset by mosquitos, by a tormenting silence, by Oriental filth, by misery." Moldavia carried Cavarnali's own musings about the state of poetry upon the start of World War II, as well as his renditions of Czech folklore (picked out from Bedřich Smetana, and translated with help from Franz Studeni). Moldavia ran alongside and against Bugeacul, which was then managed by Dragomir Petrescu and was committed to Bessarabian regionalism. In late 1939, Petrescu allowed Nencev to use Bugeacul for an editorial polemic. Nencev claimed that Cavarnali and Moldavia had displayed "ignorance toward Bessarabian literature and Bessarabian writers".

Cavarnali was also a regular contributor to journals put out elsewhere in Bessarabia, including Generația Nouă, Itinerar, and Pagini Basarabene (in addition to Viața Basarabiei), as well as a frequent traveler to the regional hub of Chișinău; in 1938, his work was also sampled by the modernist magazine of Brașov, Front Literar. A second volume of his poems was printed at Bolgrad in 1939, as Răsadul verde al inimii stelele de sus îl plouă ("The Heart's Green Seedling Is Rained upon by the Stars Above"). The title is remembered for being unusually complicated in its cultural setting. He was newly married in August 1939, and had honeymooned at the Romanian Writers' Society retreat in Bușteni.

On 24–25 March 1940, Cavarnali was a Bolgrad delegate to the first congress of the Bessarabian Writers' Society (SSB), convened by Halippa in Chișinău. He was voted in as a member of the SSB executive committee. Also in early 1940, Bugeacul featured Cavarnali's biography of, and translation from, Yugoslav poet-diplomat Jovan Dučić. He completed a Romanian version of the Kalevala, which appeared in Prepoem magazine of Bucharest. Around June 1940, during the Soviet invasion of Bessarabia, Cavarnali was for a while considered missing. In August, the Commissariat for Refugees sent out notices asking him to contact the authorities. He lost all contact with Halippa, who later reported that Cavarnali, like Nencev and Costenco, had stayed behind in Chișinău. Cavarnali himself once gave some details on this period, informing fellow author Laurențiu Fulga that he had been stranded in Chișinău, stripped of his citizenship, and court-martialed (whether by the Romanians or by the Soviets), being in danger of starving to death. In December, he was listed among the contributors to a new Bessarabian magazine "of Romanian affirmation", called Estul ("The East").

In 1941, the Ion Antonescu regime sealed a Romanian alliance with the Axis powers and joined in the anti-Soviet war, leading to the temporary recovery of Bessarabia; the Budjak was merged into the Bessarabia Governorate of Romania. The authorities found Cavarnali and reinstated him, whereupon he joined a circle of writers formed around Basarabia newspaper. On 28 March 1943, he participated in the "Glory to Bessarabia" event, organized by Gala Galaction and Viața Basarabiei at the Romanian Atheneum. From 1944 to 1947, having been displaced to Bucharest, Cavarnali worked as both a high school professor and a journalist, publishing new poems in the journal Orizonturi. In May 1944, Viața Basarabiei reported that he was "gravely ill." He achieved recognition as a translator from the Russian classics, with versions of Maxim Gorky's Mother—probably completed in the mid-1940s, and rated by Emil Manu as "the most beautiful Romanian version" of that novel—and Nikolai Gogol's Marriage.

=== Communist turn ===
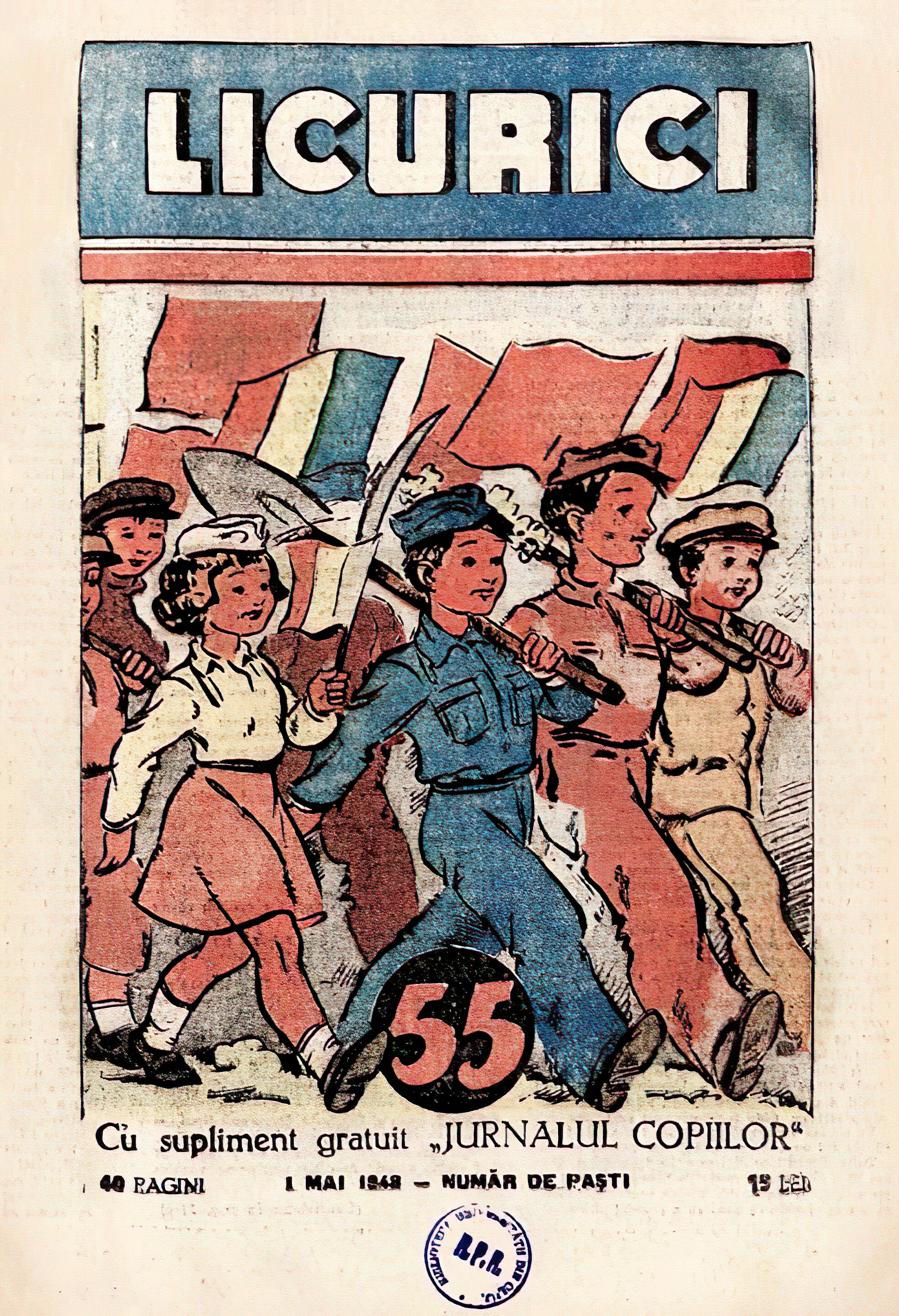
Cover of the May Day (and Easter) 1948 issue of Licurici

A leftward regime change was inaugurated by the August 1944 coup, which also brought Romania itself under a Soviet occupation. On May Day 1945, Scînteia Tineretului, put out by the Union of Communist Youth, hosted one of Cavarnali's poems; the same year, he published a version of Mikhail A. Bulatov's Geese-Swans, with its retelling of Russian folklore. Cavarnali also founded the children's magazine Înainte ("Forward"), which published its first issue on 5 October 1945. It was positively reviewed by the Romanian Communist Party paper, Scînteia: "Aimed at all Romanian children, Înainte seeks to cultivate their artistic taste, to awaken their inventive spirit, to guide them toward the finer occupations that life has to offer, while also promoting spiritual recreation." By January 1946, Înainte was receiving contributions from Eusebiu Camilar, Mihail Cruceanu, Cezar Petrescu, Ion Popescu-Puțuri, and Mihail Sadoveanu; by June, it had also featured stories by Geo Dumitrescu and translations from Pavel Bazhov. Cavarnali was for a while a teacher of Romanian literature and history at the Boys' School in Giurgiu, but, by 1947, had been moved back to the capital as a substitute teacher in Gheorghe Șincai National College. In August of that year, he achieved tenure, after passing his examination with top marks.

In late 1947, the National Theater Bucharest used Cavarnali's translation for its highly successful production of Marriage, with Victor Bumbești as a director. His version of Mother appeared around the same time, with drawings by Jules Perahim; it had two more editions by 1950. In December 1947, when he became tenured at Matei Basarab National College, his rendition of a poem by the Soviet Kirghiz Temirkul Umetaliev appeared in Graiul Nou, the Soviet–Romanian propaganda magazine. Upon the establishment of a communist regime later that month, Cavarnali began working as an editor for another young reader's publication, Licurici ("Firefly"); his colleagues there included Mihai Stoian, who had grown up reading Înainte, and who describes Cavarnali as one whose leading trait was "compassion", and who "never dared burden anyone with his presence." His sister had followed him to Bucharest, where she became Davidoglu's wife.

In January 1949, Cavarnali was assigned to the Public Education Ministry as a reviewer in the Youth Education Directorate, part of a team led by Amos Bradu. In March of that year, he was a rapporteur at the National Writers' Conference, which established a Writers' Union of Romania (USR)—he appeared there alongside Cruceanu, Mihail Davidoglu, Victor Eftimiu, Ioanichie Olteanu, Sașa Pană, Cicerone Theodorescu, and Haralamb Zincă. During May, he joined Al. Șahighian and other authors on a creative tour of the children's homes in Mogoșoaia, having been advised to directly contact their target audience.

Cavarnali had been received into the Communist Party (known then as "Workers' Party"), but, on 22 March 1950, found himself targeted by a review commission, and recommended for exclusion (alongside fellow writers Camilar, Theodorescu, Lucia Demetrius, Mihu Dragomir, Coca Farago, Alexandru Kirițescu, Sanda Movilă, Ioana Postelnicu, Zaharia Stancu, and Victor Tulbure). The decision was carried through, but, following an intercession on their behalf by communist potentate Ana Pauker, Cavarnali and the others were not exposed to further persecution; instead, they had to commit to a series of discussion with ideologists Miron Constantinescu and Leonte Răutu, so that they "do not lose hope". Cavarnali's subsequent focus on translation work produced editions of Valentina Oseyeva's Vassiok Trubachov and His Comrades (in 1950), Anna Brodele's Marta (in 1954), and Mikhail Saltykov-Shchedrin's In the World of Moderation and Precision (in 1964).

The poet's final assignments were as a cultural adviser for the Education Ministry, as well as a staff worker for Gazeta Literară and Albina, dedicated mainly to the promotion of literary education for the youth. At Gazeta, he took nominal charge of the poetry section, alongside authors such as Camil Baltazar, Nicolae Labiș, and Alexandru Andrițoiu. As the latter noted in a 1976 interview, the job was frustrating: "we were entirely useless [...], everything was done over our heads." Cavarnali attended the USR's Săptămîna Poeziei festival at Constanța in late 1963, being billed alongside Theodorescu, Vlaicu Bârna, Aurel Gurghianu, and Adrian Maniu. "After great suffering", Cavarnali died in Bucharest on 19 July 1966, and was buried in the city's Bellu Cemetery. Literary critic and historian Nicolae Manolescu (who was in his twenties when Cavarnali died), notes that many, including himself, were no longer aware that he and other interwar authors had even survived into the 1960s. It was only in the late 1990s, upon reading a biographical dictionary compiled by Mircea Zaciu, when he realized that he and Cavarnali had been contemporaries. Ecaterina outlived her brother by more than 30 years, her first and only published volume appearing in Romania in 1998, when she was aged 80.

== Work ==
Vladimir Cavarnali is largely seen as a Romanian disciple of Russian Symbolism, and more generally the Russian avant-garde; an often cited precursor and model is Sergei Yesenin (from whose works he translated in the 1930s). Călinescu describes Cavarnalian poetry as essentially "proletarian" and "diurnal", bridging the gap between Yesenin and the modern poets of Transylvania. He also notes the activity of three "Yesenians" in modern Romanian literature—the other two being George Lesnea and Virgil Carianopol. A similar point is made by Manu, who describes Cavarnali as "one who became a Yesenian through direct influence", while Carianopol's debt to Russian Symbolism was "coincidental". Manu also identifies Cavarnali's other mentors as Tudor Arghezi and Alexander Blok, both of whom are referenced by name, alongside Yesenin, in one of the Poesii. The poet himself once commented on the works of his fellow Yesenian Lesnea, highlighting their freshness.

A leading characteristic of Cavarnali's own Yesenianism was a near-complete absence of political undertones. As noted by Dobrudzhanski Glas, Cavarnali's poetry was unlike that of his Bulgarian Romanian peers in that it was "almost devoid of social sentiments and themes". According to Călinescu, Poesii should be regarded as a work of nostalgia for the "simple and narrow universe" of his rural childhood. The landscape he pines for is the Budjak Steppe with its "coarse flat plains"—Cavarnali specifically instructed men not to seek their love "where the cherry-trees blossom". This "Yesenian model of 'the uprooted'" is described by literary historian Alexandru Burlacu as introduced to Romanian poetry by three Bessarabians: Cavarnali, Nencev, and Nicolai Costenco. Its recurrence led some reviewers to question whether Cavarnali was not in fact a traditionalist. In a 1935 piece, modernist author Mihail Sebastian saw Cavarnali as one of the poets ultimately emerging from the bucolic school of Sămănătorul, though one "by no means untalented". Among the traditionalists, Mircea Streinul simply noted that, unlike Stamatu, Jebeleanu and Vrânceanu, "Vladimir Cavarnali is no poet".

In his second creative period, and especially during his time at Viața Basarabiei, Cavarnali was explicitly radical for his regional context—with Costenco, Nencev, Bogdan Istru, and Sergiu Matei Nica, he sought a "new spirituality" deriding the "has-beens", including Halippa, Ion Buzdugan, Ștefan Ciobanu, and Gheorghe V. Madan. Răsadul verde al inimii stelele de sus îl plouă advertised itself as containing "genius poems, fresh poems" composed on a "mad lyre"—though, Călinescu argues, this was not the case: "the lyrics are in a minor tone, without precise originality, with some light touches from the weeping of Camil Baltazar". Commentators such as Burlacu and Costenco were more welcoming, with the former noting that the volume was veering into Expressionism and Futurism, with echoes from Imagism, Charles Baudelaire, and especially Walt Whitman. Costenco was enthusiastic about Cavarnali's panegyric to a "tragic man", a "Prometheus" that was also the "Bessarabian soul". He viewed Răsadul as forming a singular poetic cycle, with themes that evoked both Mihai Eminescu's Luceafărul and Alfred de Vigny's Moïse. Similar claims were made by scholar George Meniuc, who saw Cavarnali's writings as documenting the "death of an era", with uncertainty about what would follow it. One fragment (seen by Burlacu as quintessentially Expressionistic) is in part a love poem to a Nogai Tatar woman of the steppe. It ends with the following poetic confession, about the impossibility of quitting modern life:

Nu, tătăroaica mea, păr brun ca iadul!
Niciodată rândunelele n-au iernat în locurile noastre.
Păstrează-te, fecioară, cum în crivăț, frunza, bradul,
Cum stelele se-nverșunează sus, în locuința lor
albastră!
Eu sunt cu orfanii pe drumurile culturii...
În căruțe de foc alerg să-nfrățesc bucuria cu oțelul.
Sunt fiul naturii și voievodul orașelor
Și ascult cum plesnește-n epoca nouă fierul...

Translation:

No, Tatar girl, girl with hair black as graves!
Never have swallows wintered in our land.
Preserve thyself, o virgin, like firs when the wind raves,
Like stars that save themselves, in their abode
of blue!
I'll be out with my orphans, on roads that lead to culture...
In chariots of fire, to temper joy with steel.
Well I, I am a son of nature, and a prince of the city,
Here to see the new era, bursting out of its iron peel...

Burlacu suggests that, beyond its "barbarian" facade, Răsadul still cultivated the staples of Romanian Symbolism, Aestheticism, and Parnassianism—and that the exploration of ancient myths, in the works of Cavarnali and his Bessarabian peers, corresponded to this subdued influence. His sister Ecaterina is similarly described as a "belated Symbolist" by critic Adrian Dinu Rachieru. Vladimir's poems were still panned by the columnist of România daily, who noted of the samples published by Viața Basarabiei in 1938:

We would have wanted, or rather some have wanted, "our own prodigals". And one of them was Mr Vladimir Cavarnali, a young Bessarabian who entered Romanian poetry after a brief and callous reading from Sergei Yesenin. We have since found true poets to translate from Yesenin, and then, his original inspiration exposed, Mr Vladimir Cavarnali had lost his spirit [...] [If he] never found himself a new Yesenin, why does that Chișinău magazine print him, with his deplorable spiritual dearth? For now, it's better to print nothing, rather than something by Cavarnali.

In similar vein, the traditionalists at Neamul Românesc derided their content as modernist-aiurist ("modernist-drivelist"), with an abundance of nimicuri poleite ("gilded trifles"). The group did concede that Cavarnali could still write "beautifully—when not simply acceptably", as with the sample:

În slovele mele cântă toate miracolele lumii,
De aceea luminez cu zenitul în tărie,
Ca un basm al unor veșnice primăveri,
Hărzit cu triluri primitive de ciocârlie.

Translation:

All the world's wonders are captured in my verse,
As the light of a zenith colors me to my fill,
Like a fairy-tale of springs carrying on forever,
Endowed by a lark with her primitive trill.

Demetrescu described the volume as a "poetic garden" still riddled with "weeds", advising Cavarnali to reduce the weight of his self-referential poetry in any future works. With an article he penned in Moldavia shortly after, Cavarnali stirred controversy by arguing that there was no point to writing poetry in the "era of confusion" brought on by the European war; he contended that poets would have done best to bask in their own solitude. In a March 1944 issue of Gândirea, poet-theorist Nichifor Crainic looked back on Cavarnali as having "a certain touch, yet not finding a precise contour in his poetic inclinations." Crainic reserved his praise for more explicitly nationalist poets, a generation "molded by the school of the motherland", with Nica as a leading exponent. Cavarnali's postwar reemergence was as a communist poet: as Manu notes, especially in 1955–1958 he discarded the "desolation and bucolic sentimentalism" of his interwar contributions, making a poetic subject from his "certified convictions".
