= Liviu Deleanu =

Moldovan and Romanian writer (1911–1967)

- Born: Lipe Kligman; 21 February 1911; Iași
- Died: 12 May 1967 (aged 56); Chișinău
- Occupations: poet, playwright

Liviu Deleanu (born Lipe Kligman; 21 February 1911 – 12 May 1967) was a Moldovan and Romanian poet and playwright, a doyen of postwar Moldovan literature.

== Biography ==
=== In Iași ===
Liviu Deleanu was born in Iași, the capital of the Romanian province of Moldavia, in a house on strada Veche (Veche street) in 1911. His father, Semi (Shmil) Kligman, was a poet in Yiddish and Hebrew, who supported his earliest poetic efforts. Deleanu hated his childhood, recalling the privations faced by him and his mother after his father was conscripted during the First World War. His mother, who was not well educated, instilled in him a love of language and folk imagination. However, it was his aunt, famous in the family for her verses, from whom he inherited his poetic gift.

Deleanu studied at a cheder and at a Romanian gymnasium. At age 11, he began an apprenticeship as a lithographer and a proofreader, and quickly entered the literary life. He joined the magazine Vitrina Literară (Literary showcase) as a staff-member at the age of 16, where he wrote under the pseudonyms Cliglon and C.L. Deleanu. The same year, under the name Liviu Deleanu, he published his first collection of poetry Oglinzi fermecate (Magic mirrors).

In 1928, along with the poet Virgil Gheorghiu (1903-1977), Deleanu founded his own journal Prospect (subtitled Simptom literar), which was recognised by George Călinescu in his authoritative Istoria literaturii române (History of Romanian Literature) as one of the first modernist periodicals published in Romania. In the first three issues, edited by Deleanu himself, appeared poems by him and Virgil Gheorghiu; from the fourth issue onwards, other names appeared as well: Mihail Bicleanu, Sașa Pană, Aurel Zaremba and others.

=== In Bucharest ===
In 1928, Deleanu continued his literary career in Bucharest. During his sojourn in the Romanian capital, he wrote theatre reviews, reportage, articles on art, advertising, printed translation from the Yiddish, and published fragments of his novel in such journals as Adam (the organ of the Jewish community of the city), Ediție specială (Special edition), Bilete de papagal (a satirical magazine edited by Tudor Arghezi) and Cuvîntul liber (The Free Word). His second collection of poetry Ceasul de veghe (The Hour of the Vigil) was released by Santier publishing house in 1937 to favourable reviews from Bucharest's critics such as George Călinescu ('Mr. Deleanu's collection of poems reveals humanitarian concerns, sympathy for the miners, workers, designers, vagrants. The subject should not frighten, because Mr. Deleanu has treated it with remarkable skill...'), Izabella Sadoveanu, and Enrica Furtuna.

Deleanu's third collection Glod alb (White mud) was published by Cultura Poporului (Popular Culture) in 1940. In it was included a long poetic cycle on the Spanish Civil War that was originally written in 1937, Sabii peste Spania (Swords over Spain), along with well-known poems such as Serenade pe baricade (Serenade on the barricades), Don Quijote, Guernica, A doua moarte (Second death). In the prewar years, some of Deleanu's poems became popular songs, including Sanie cu zurgălăi (Sleigh bells - set to music by Richard Stein, 1909-1992), which was for a long time considered the national song.

=== In Moldova ===
After the absorption of Bessarabia into the USSR, Deleanu moved to Chișinău and immediately joined the literary life of the city. Along with Bogdan Istru, he translated the National Anthem of the Soviet Union into Romanian.

During the Second World War, he lived in Moscow, translating Russian poetry into Romanian. Some of the poets he translated were Ivan Krylov, Alexander Pushkin, Mikhail Lermontov, Nikolay Nekrasov, Sergei Yesenin, Sergey Mikhalkov, Korney Chukovsky, Aleksandr Tvardovsky as well as Agniya Barto. He wrote Balada lui Kotovschii (The Ballad of Kotovsky), Ballada urii and several other works. From 1943, he also worked as literary editor of the ensemble Doina.

Returning to Chișinău in 1944, Deleanu received news of the death of his parents during the Iași pogrom of 1941, in which during a week, more than 14,000 Jews of the town were murdered. Deleanu wrote the anguished poem Coșmar (Nightmare).

The same year, he met his soon-to-be wife, Baka Rivilis (1921-2005), at Soroca, where she was working at the provincial archives. For the rest of his life, she remained a faithful and energetic promoter of Deleanu's oeuvre while maintaining a busy schedule of her own translation work.

In the post-war years, he wrote Elegy to victory and his great poem Krasnodon (1950; but a reworked version of this appeared in book form titled Tinerețe fără moarte (Immortal youth) came out in 1957, with eleven subsequent editions), which was influenced by A. A. Fadeyev's Young Guard. In 1951, he wrote the dramatic poem Buzduganul fermeca (The magic mace), based on a Moldovan folk-tale; it remains very popular in the Moldovan theatre to this day. His wartime poems were published in the 1952 collection Vremuri noi (New times).

In subsequent years, he published numerous other collections of poetry: Mi-i drag să meșteresc (I love tinkering, 1953), Poezii și poeme (Poems, 1954), Cǎnturi de ieri și de azi (Songs of the past and the present, 1958), Stihuri alese (Collected poetry, 1958), Freamăt (1962), Ieșire din legendă (Exit into legend, 1963), Dragostea noastră cea de toată zilele (Our everyday love, 1966), Versuri (Verses, 1967). He also wrote books for children: Poezii pentru copii (Verses for children, 1947), Nepoțica o învață pe bunica (The Granddaughter teaches her grandmother, 1952), Licurici: stihuri pentru mici (Firefly: poems for little ones, 1961), Triluri vesele (Merry trills, 1963 and 1979).

After his premature death, Deleanu's oeuvre went into several editions, including the collections Scrieri (Writings in two volumes), De la mic la mare (For little ones and big ones, 1968), Cartea dorului (Book of wishes, 1968), Destăinuire (1970), Strigăt din inimă (Cry from the heart, 1976), Cu cântări și flori pe plai (With songs and flowers of the realm, 1980), Și de n-ar fi cuvântul iubire (Were there no word for love, 1981), Chem cântecul (Call songs, 1982), Ala-bala portocala (1984), Ciocârlii pentru copii (Larks for kids, 1987), Poezii (Poems, 1991), Zăpăcilă (2002).

Selected poems began to appear in collections in Romania: Răscolite tăceri (2001) and Prutele, tăcutele! (2003) in Timișoara, and Vremi în alte vremi topite (2005) in Iași. The publisher Causa Mundi (Chișinău) released Deleanu's translations of Pushkin's The Fisherman and the Golden Fish (Povestea pescarului si a pestisorului de aur, 2005). Many of his children's poems gained prominence in Russian translation.

Some of Deleanu's works were set to music: Poem on Haia Lifșiț by the composer Solomon Lobel (1910-1981) for mixed choir, a cappella and solo (1965).

=== Lyrics for Songs ===
Sanie cu zurgălăi (Sleigh bells) music by the composer Richard Stein (1936)

Nu înțeleg de ce (Don't know why) music by the composer Arkady Luxemburg (1964)

During the last months of his life, Deleanu finished The Book of Wishes, having written a poem a day. He died in hospital on 12 May 1967. During his literary career in Moldova, Deleanu never received any literary prizes. Posthumously, however, he was awarded the Boris Glavan Komsomol Prize in 1967 for his poem Tinerețe fără moarte (Immortal youth). These days, his poems are included in the curricula of Moldovan schools.

In Romania, Deleanu's works remain practically unknown, and only recently have they started appearing in disparate books and magazines, despite the fact that his Romanian sojourn had been one of the most fruitful of his life. The reasons for this obscurity can be found in the realities of pre-war Romania and the political circumstances that forced him to emigrate to Soviet Moldavia. For the same reasons, Deleanu's artistic oeuvre accomplished while in Romania remained practically unknown in Soviet Moldavia as well.

== Style ==
Deleanu's poetry evolved from the modernism of his early days to a more traditional style of classical poetry in his later years. Its motives, concepts and expressive works of the period between the first and second world wars, are modern, fitting perfectly in the direction of Romanian poetry of those years. He used modernist techniques and stylistic devices of poetry including free verse. In the 1950s and 1960s, however, Deleanu's literary profile took a new and different form. In his poetry collections, which included literary works of absolute maturity, he cleaved to the traditional in his classic expression. The world of his creations of the postwar period is based on a certain themes: love, nature, the process of creation, the fate of the creator, and age over time - the motives which in the context of the Bessarabian poetry of the postwar period, clearly depict the image of a lyric poet of genuine sensitivity. His poetry indicates a special interest in formal and expressive perfection.
