= Mihail Davidoglu =

Romanian playwright (1910–1987)

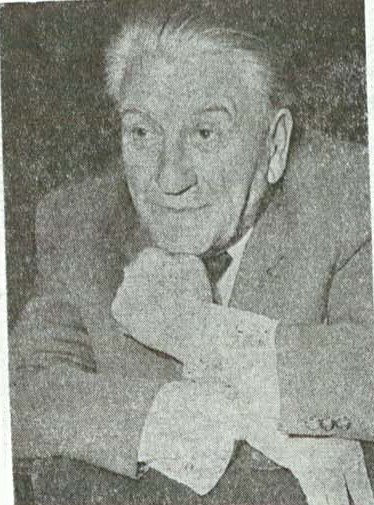
Davidoglu in 1985

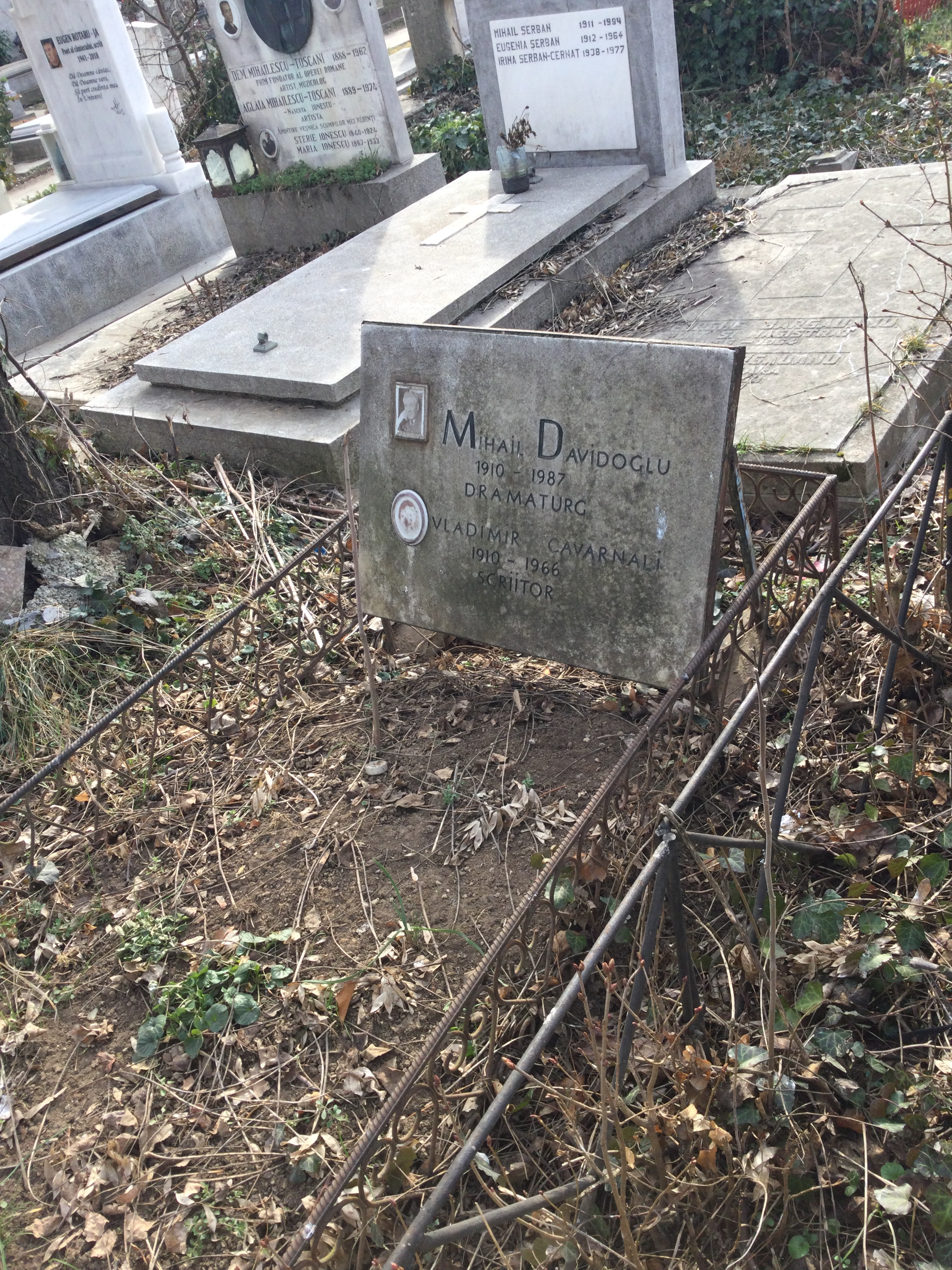
Grave in Bellu Cemetery, shared with Vladimir Cavarnali

Mihail Davidoglu (November 11, 1910 – August 17, 1987) was a Romanian playwright.

Born into a Jewish family in Hârlău, his parents were Mihail Davidoglu, a port worker, and his wife Clara (née Kochen). Mihail attended the Israelite Community High School in Galați, graduating in 1929, and the literature and philosophy faculty of the University of Bucharest, which he completed in 1932. He was a Latin teacher (1932–1941), a bureaucrat within the Arts Ministry (1945–1948), president of the culture committee in Bucharest's Sector 1, and held various positions within the Romanian Writers' Union.

Davidoglu's literary debut was the 1936 radio drama Marinarul smirniot; his first success was Omul din Ceatal, written in 1943 and staged in 1947. Other plays included Minerii (1949, Cetatea de foc (1950), Horia (1955), Ochii dragi ai bunicului (1970), Străbunul (1971), Platforma magică (1973), Cele trei Marii din vale, Noi, cei din vale, Din pragul veșniciei (1983) and Suflete în furtună (1986). Under the communist regime, he won the Romanian Academy's prize in 1949, the State Prize in 1950 and 1953, the Order of Cultural Merit, 2nd class in 1971, and the Bucharest Writers' Association Prize in 1983.

Davidoglu died on August 17, 1987; he was survived by his poet wife Ecaterina Cavarnali-Davidoglu, whose first-ever volume was only printed in 1998, when she was aged 80. Of mixed Bessarabian Bulgarian and Gagauz heritage, she had been the sister of poet-editor Vladimir Cavarnali.
