= Iulian Ciocan =

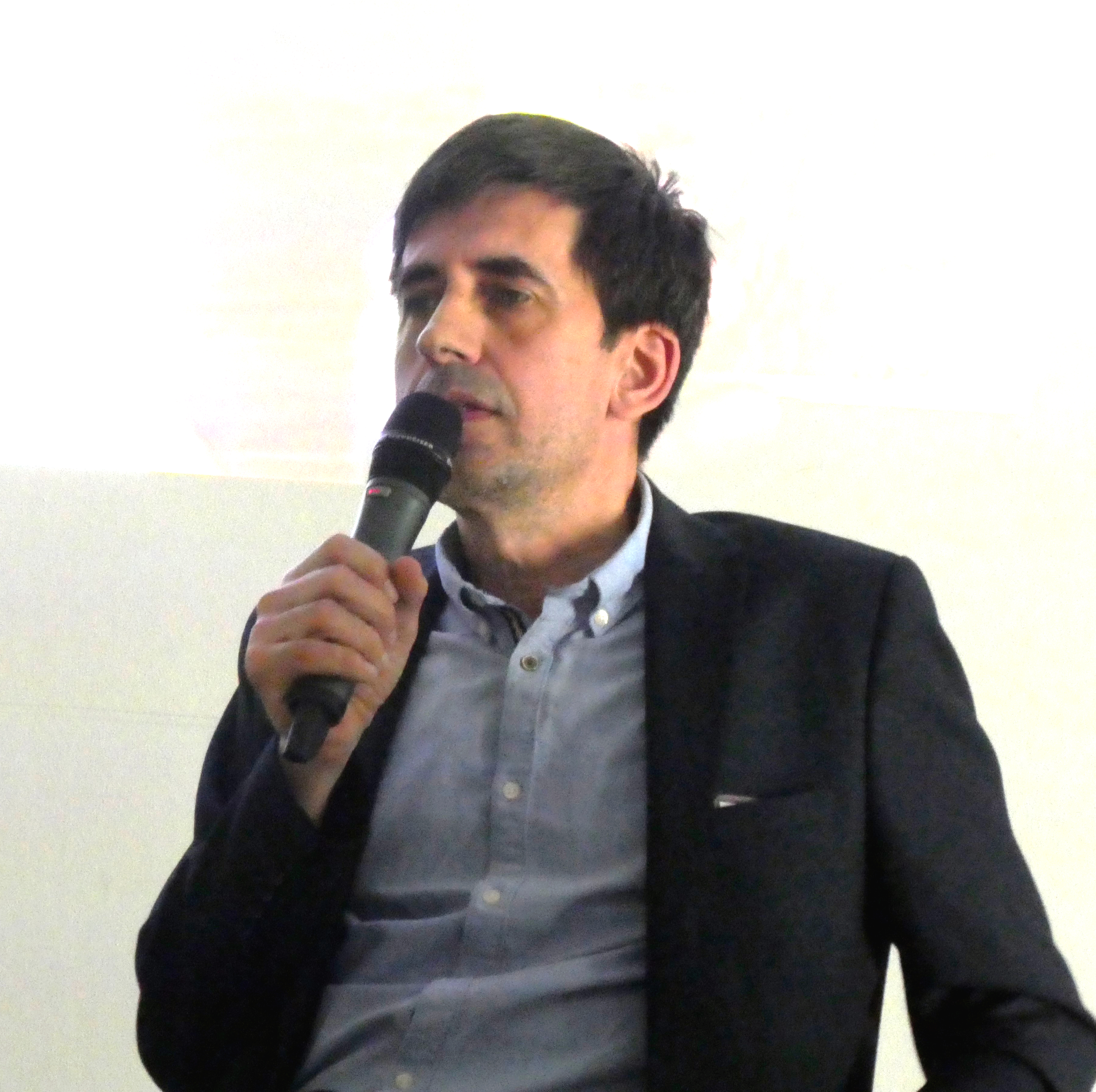
Ciocan in 2023

Iulian Ciocan (born 6 April 1968) is a writer, literary critic and radio show host from Moldova.

== Biography ==
Iulian Ciocan was born in Chișinău, Moldavian Soviet Socialist Republic. He studied philology at Transilvania University of Brașov. Since 1998, he was a commentator for Radio Free Europe. Since 2022, he has been working at Vocea Basarabiei.

He is a member of the Moldovan Writers' Union, the Writers' Union of Romania, and the Moldovan PEN Centre. In 2025, he was awarded the Premiul Constantin Stere in Literature from the Ministry of Culture.

== Works ==
- Înainte să moară Brejnev (2007). Before Brezhnev Died, trans. Alistair Ian Blyth (Dalkey Archive, 2020)
- Tărîmul lui Sașa Kozak (2011). "The Realm of Sasha Kozak"
- Iar dimineața vor veni rușii (2015). "In the Morning, the Russians Will Arrive"
- Dama de cupă (2018). "The Queen of Hearts"
- Clovnul (2021). "Clown"
