= Leonid Corneanu =

Moldovan poet and playwright

Leonid Cornfeld
- Born: 1 January 1909; Coşniţa, Tiraspolsky Uyezd, Kherson Governorate, Russian Empire
- Died: 26 November 1957 (aged 48); Chișinău, Moldavian SSR, Soviet Union
- Occupations: poet, playwright, literary critic
- Writing career
- Pen name: Leonid Corneanu
- Genre: Socialist Realism

Leonid Corneanu (born Leonid Cornfeld; 1 January 1909, Coşniţa – 26 November 1957, Chișinău) was a Moldovan poet, playwright, and folklorist.

== Early life ==
Corneanu was born in the village of Coşniţa in the Tiraspolsky Uyezd of Kherson Governorate (present-day Dubăsari District, Moldova). He graduated from the pedagogical institute at Tiraspol, the Shevchenko literary institute at Kharkov (1932), and obtained a doctorate from the Moscow Institute of Philosophy, Literature, and History. From 1936, he worked at the scientific institute of the Moldavian ASSR, and taught at the Tiraspol pedagogical institute.

== Poetic career ==
Corneanu published his first poems in the journal Moldova literară in 1929, and a collection Versuri felurite (Various poems) the very next year. He used his birthname of Cornfeld for these publications. In 1933, Avânturi came out in Tiraspol. In 1939, he published Cântece şi poezii (Songs and poems).

Corneanu published a book of poetry From the valley of the Dniester in 1947; there were posthumous collections Versuri (1965) and Poezii (1970).

== Novelistic and Dramatic Career ==
Corneanu was one of the originators of children's literature in Moldova. Over a period of several years, he collected Moldovan folk songs, tales and idioms. In 1939, along with the composer David Herschfeld, he published the book Cântece norodnice moldoveneşti (Moldovan national songs, with annotations). In 1941 came out Proverbe, cimilituri şi expresii norodnice moldoveneşti (Moldovan folk songs and proverbs).

Corneanu was in the Soviet army during the Second World War; upon demobilisation, he moved to Chișinău. Here he wrote a series of theatre pieces as well as musical comedies, which were then staged by various theatres in Moldova: În vaile Moldovâ (In the valleys of Moldavia, with Yakov Kutkovetsky, set to music by Eugen Coca, 1945), Fericirea Mărioarei (Maria's Fortune, with E. Gherken, set to music by Eugen Coca, 1951), Ileana's carpet (1953), Beyond the Blue Danube (1955), Izvorul frăţiei (The origin of brotherhood, 1956), The Bitterness of Love (1957). Several of his works were translated into Russian, and staged in theatres across the USSR.

== Film career ==
In 1951, the director Boris Barnet made Lyana, a comedy written by Corneanu, the first feature film of the studio Moldova-Film.

== Translator ==
Corneanu translated into the Moldovan language books by Taras Shevchenko, Vladimir Mayakovsky, Alexander Bezymensky, Demyan Bedny, as well as Lermontov's A Hero of Our Time.

== Controversies and Criticisms ==
The compendium of folklore and folk songs Corneanu collected in the 1930s was seen even by his Communist colleagues as somewhat suspect. Despite the joy and gratitude to Soviet power overflowing in these songs, with collective farms, Soviet soldiers, Stakhanovites, tractor drivers and Stalin portrayed as the new heroes of the era, George Meniuc criticised their authenticity, albeit without addressing the reality of the themes of the folklore.

In 1949, Corneanu abandoned his wife and two daughters for a student of his. He was urged by the Communist party to return to his family, but he responded with confusing and conflicting statements: it was not he that left his wife, rather she left him; he loved the student, but at the same time he didn't want to divorce his wife because he was still attached to his family. For his 'dissolute conduct' and 'non-Bolshevik attitude of disrespect to the family', Corneanu was severely criticised by the Communists.

== Bibliography ==
1. Versuri felurite, Tiraspol, 1930;
2. Tiraspolul, Tiraspol, 1932;
3. Avânturi, Tiraspol, 1933;
4. Pionierii în ţeh, Tiraspol-Balta, 1934;
5. Lumini şi umbre, Tiraspol, 1935;
6. Cântece şi poezii, Tiraspol, 1939;
7. Din Valea Nistrului, Chişinău, 1947;
8. Povestea lui Petrică, Chişinău, 1951;
9. Fericirea Mărioarei (în colaborare cu E. Gherken), Chişinău, 1951;
10. Nătălica mititica, Chişinău, 1954;
11. Opere alese, Chişinău, 1954;
12. Piese, Chişinău, 1956;
13. Versuri, Chişinău, 1965;
14. Poezii, Chişinău, 1970;
15. Scrieri, prefaţă de Simion Cibotaru, Chişinău, 1973;
16. Izvorul frăţiei, I-II, Chişinău, 1977-1978.

== Citations ==
1. Negura, Petru (2009). Ni héros, ni traîtres: Les écrivains moldaves face au pouvoir soviétique sous Staline (in French). Editions L'Harmattan. ISBN 978-2-296-21603-7.
