= Emilian Bucov =

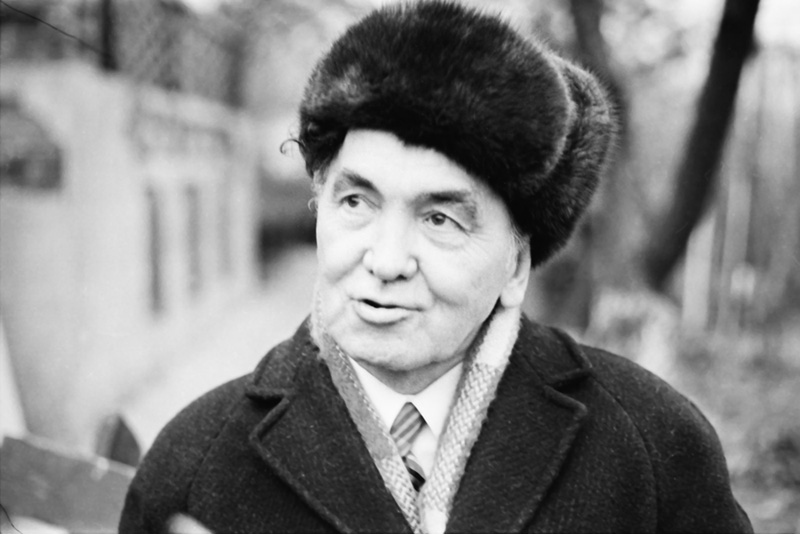
- Bucov in 1972
- Born: August 8, 1909; Kiliia, Bessarabia Governorate, Russian Empire present-day Odessa Oblast, Ukraine
- Died: October 17, 1984 (aged 75); Chișinău, Moldavian SSR, USSR present-day Moldova
- Citizenship: Kingdom of Romania (before 1940); Soviet Union (after 1940)
- Education: Faculty of Letters and Philosophy, University of Bucharest (1936)
- Occupations: poet, prose writer, playwright, translator, politician
- Writing career
- Pen name: Radu Emilian
- Language: Romanian, Russian
- Genre: Proletkult
- Movements: Socialist realism

Deputy of the Supreme Soviet of the Soviet Union
- In office 1946–1954

Deputy-chairman of the Council of People's Commissars of the Moldavian SSR
- In office 1947–1951

Chairman of the Writers' Union of the Moldovan SSR
- In office 1945–1946
- In office 1955–1958

Personal details
- Party: Communist Party of the Soviet Union (after 1940)
- Other political affiliations: Union of Communist Youth (before 1940)
- Awards: Hero of Socialist Labour (1979), Order of Lenin (1949, 1979), Order of the Red Banner of Labour (1959, 1979), State Prize of the Moldovan SSR (1966), People's Writer of the Moldovan SSR (1982)

Emilian Bucov or Bukov (Russian: Емилиа́н Не́стерович Бу́ков; 8 August [O.S. 26 July] 1909 – 17 October 1984) was a Soviet and Moldavian writer and poet, recognized with the State Prize of the Moldavian SSR and honorary title of People's Writer of the Moldavian SSR (1982). He studied at the Bucharest University and took part in underground communist movement. Bukov was awarded the Hero of Socialist Labour in 1979 for his work, the Order of Lenin medal twice and the Order of the Red Banner of Labour, twice.

== Biography ==
=== Professional and political activity ===
He was born in a poor Lipovan and Moldovan family, he graduated from, after overcoming material difficulties, the "B.P. Hașdeu" lyceum in Chișinău (1930) and then, the Faculty of Letters and Philosophy of the University of Bucharest (1936). As a student, he became a member of the Union of Communist Youth and unlawfully carries out various political activities.

From 1940 he fled to Moscow and contributes through his lyrics to the dissemination of anti-Romanian Bolshevik slogans. Established in 1944 in Chișinău, he was considered one of the leading activist writers in Moldavian SSR. He was the chairperson of the Writers' Union (1945-1946, 1955-1958), deputy chairperson of the Soviet Ministries of the MSR (1947-1951), editor-in-chief of the Nistru magazine (1966-1971). He was awarded the State Prize of Moldova (1966), entitled Hero of Socialist Labour (1979) and The People's Writer (1982).

=== Writings ===
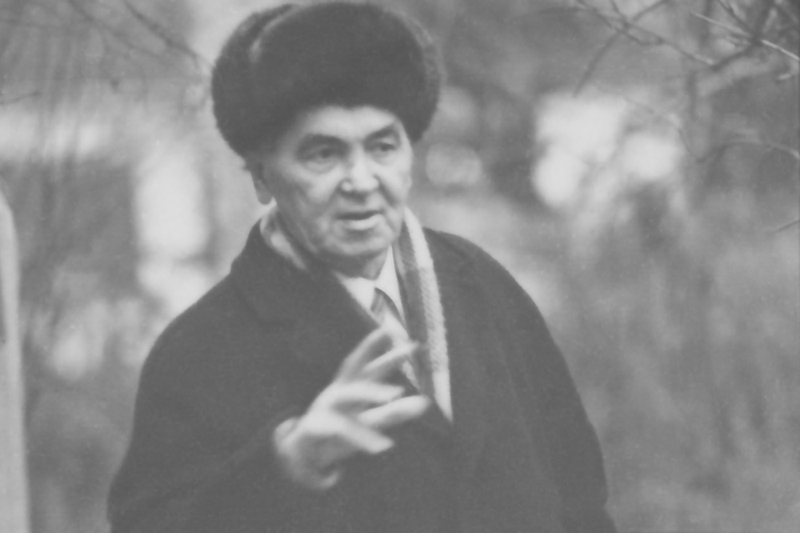
Soviet Moldavian writer and poet, Emilian Bucov

Bucov collaborated with the left wing or avant-garde magazines; his first writing was a translation from Russian language, published in 1933 in Herald. He then continues to publish lyrics and prose at the Literary and Artistic Truth (Adevărul literar și artistic), the Free Word (Cuvîntul Liber), the Torch (Făclia) and the Society of Tomorrow (Societatea de Mâine), signing either Bâcov or Bucov. He published in the Free Word weekly a "moderate left article"; the weekly under the leadership of Tudor Teodorescu-Braniște was published 1933 by the end of 1936 and where he signed his articles as Radu Bîcov-Emilian in which deplored the situation of the exploited workers or calling them for strikes. His lyric looks like was produced by a vocal rioter, which announces the "Parnassus sunset," and rejects the bourgeois poetry (including the Eminescu), cultivating and promoting the firebrand proletarian thematics. The model was the Soviet poetry of that time, especially the one of Vladimir Mayakovsky, which he translated and whom made popular.

He gathered his lyrics from the Romanian period in the “Speech of the Sun” (Discursul Soarelui) volumes (1937) and China (1938). The Soviet period began in 1942 in Moscow, where the volumes containing violent anti-Romanian lyrics appeared. It is the guideline that has been preserved for four decades, the time when he published a lot. An industrial polygraph, Bucov presents the clichés of Soviet propaganda in poemes, in novels, in dramaturgy, guided by the principle - which he has also rhyme - "Moscow is my sun and Kyiv is my brother". Around his life and writings, Soviet officials have created a fruitful legend. He also made the translation of I.Ilf, E. Petrov and Sergei Yesenin.

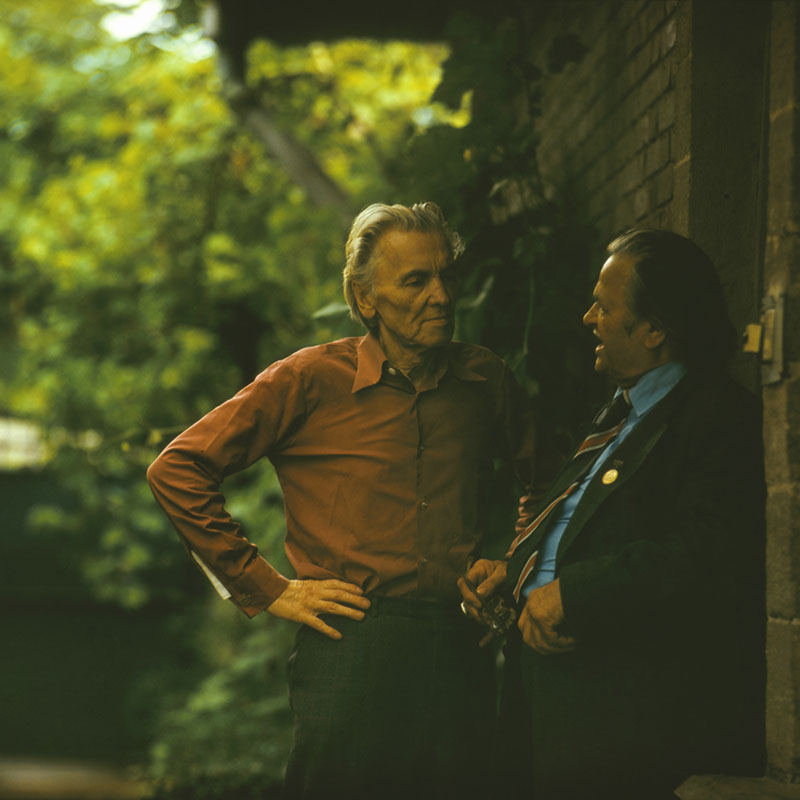
Bucov (left) with actor Constantin Constantinov, 1980
