= Igor Ursenco =

Moldovan-born Romanian poet and writer

Igor Ursenco (born 9 February 1971) is a Moldovan-born Romanian poet, fiction writer, screenwriter, culturologist, pedagogue, political analyst, and polyglot translator.

== Early life ==
Igor Ursenco is the matrilineal descendant from Northern Bessarabian dynasty of scholar Marcu Văluță, director of the interwar publication Moldovan Thought.

== Career ==
In October 2012 he was appointed to organise the Romanian Cultural Institute in Kyiv as a Deputy Coordinator.

Igor Ursenco is known also as a polyvalent author and the promoter of critical integrative method theo-e-retikon. Igor Ursenco has adopted since his debut book the artistic celebration of the spiritual alterity.

Ursenco is a sporadic contributor to the literature and culture e-zines EgoPhobia and Europe's Times and Unknown Waters, and the scientific journal Metaliteratura published by the Moldavian Academy of Sciences and the Faculty of Philology at Ion Creanga University. In 2016, he received a PhD in Letters Magna cum laude.

== Works ==
=== Poetry ===
- exFaustiv, Integral Publishing House, Bucharest, October 2020;
- Poetically incorrect, Rafet Publishing House, Ramnicu Sarat, 2015, The Contest Poetry Winner, Editura Rafet;
- The Flying Spaghetti Monster (thriller poems), Tracus Arte Publishing House, Bucharest, 2012;
- apoptosium (a recital for a regnum not classified yet), Franc Tireur USA Publishing House, New York, USA, 2010 – nominated by boomlit.com among „The Books of 2010” and included in The Long List of the „Observator cultural”/ Cultural Observer Awards, in „Poetry” section;
- The Clause of the Most Favored Maramures and Basarabia Contemporary Poetry (International Lyrical Anthology, Limes Publishing House, Cluj-Napoca, 2010;
- „Logos”, My Father : My Mother „Imago”, Heterotypic genealogy in archetypal texts, Limes Publishing House, Cluj-Napoca, 2009

=== Prose ===
- Moldavian Kaïros (a thriller novel), Blumenthal Publishing House, Bucharest, 2012;
- A Zero Degree Alert in the Current Romanian Short Prose, Herg Benet Publishers Publishing House, Bucharest, 2011;
- S.T.E.P. (short stories), Herg Benet Publishers Publishing House, Bucharest, 2011

=== Transcultural Essays ===
- EgoBesTiaR (trans-cultural essays), Herg Benet Publishers Publishing House, Bucharest, 2011;
- Teo-e-retikon (Trans-Cultural Essays & Meta-Semantic Glosses), Eikon Publishing House, Cluj-Napoca, 2009, awarded by Maramures County Council and the Baia Mare Mayoralty with the distinction of ”The Books of 2009 – section: essays”

=== Film scripts and plays ===
- The Akashic Retina (film scripts and plays), Mega Publishing House, Cluj-Napoca, 2009

== Published texts foreign languages (English, Spanish, Hungarian) ==
- Red Room Writers Community
- The Caterpillar Chronicles online Literary Journal
- The Fwriction Review online Literary Journal
- Ego Phobia online Literary Journal
- International Hungarian PEN Club Multilingual Anthology (Pécs Writers Camp - 2012)
- Arte Poetica, Album Nocturno

== Miscellaneous ==
- Distributed Actor in the Jeff Goldblum & Greta Scacchi starring movie One of the Hollywood Ten (Madrid, 2000)
- Finalist of the Folk Music Festival „Yellow Quince” the first edition (Chisinau, 1990)

== Affiliations ==
- Member of the P.E.N. Club Romania (2013)
- Writers' Union of Romania (2012)
- Writers' Union of Republic of Moldova (2010)
- Liceo Poetico de Benidorm (Alicante, Spain)
- Opera scrisa.ro
