= Octav Sargețiu =

Romanian poet

Octav Sargețiu (born Dumitru V. Popa; October 23, 1908 – November 21, 1994) was a Romanian poet.

== Biography ==
Born in Vlad Țepeș, Călărași County, his parents Vișan Popa and Maria (née Cristea) were peasants. He attended the normal school for teachers in Călărași from 1921 to 1927, and from 1927 to 1938 was director of the primary school in Mîrzaci, Orhei County, in Bessarabia. Remaining in the province until the 1940 Soviet occupation, he edited Cuvânt moldovenesc magazine at Chișinău. He then moved to Bucharest, where he edited Albina magazine, Căminul cultural and Școala țăranului from 1940 to 1947; he also edited Viața Basarabiei there from 1940 to 1944. From 1948 to 1952, he headed the Al. I. Cuza popular athenaeum; from 1953 to 1956, he directed the Ștefan Gheorghiu cultural center.

His first published work appeared in Brazda magazine in Călărași in 1927 under the pen name Dumitru Octav Sargețiu, which became his official name in 1945. The poem "Sărmana plebe" appeared in Tribuna in the same town in 1929, for the first time under the name Octav Sargețiu. He also wrote for Revista Fundațiilor Regale, Gândirea, Convorbiri Literare, Curentul literar, Vremea, Familia, Epigrama, Însemnări ieșene, Fapta, Claviaturi, Luceafărul, Steaua and România Literară. His first book, the 1942 poetry collection Cântece în singurătate, won the Romanian Writers' Society prize; in 1945, it was followed by a second, Satul meu, povestea mea.
