= Sergiu Grossu =

Romanian writer and theologian

- Born: 14 November 1920; Cubolta
- Died: 25 July 2009 (aged 88); Bucharest
- Resting place: Bucharest
- Other name: Simion Cubolta
- Education: University of Bucharest
- Occupation: Theologian
- Spouse: Nicole Valéry Grossu (1919–96)
- Parent(s): Ion and Maria Grossu

Sergiu Grossu (14 November 1920 in Cubolta – 25 July 2009 in Bucharest) was a Romanian writer and theologian.

== Biography ==
Sergiu Grossu was born to Ion and Maria Grossu on 14 November 1920 in Cubolta. In 1927, his family moved to Bălți, where he was a classmate of Eugen Coșeriu. He published in Viața Basarabiei. He graduated from the University of Bucharest with degrees in theology, philosophy and modern philology. Following the Soviet occupation of Bessarabia and Northern Bukovina, he became a refugee in Bucharest. In the wake of the Soviet occupation of Romania, he joined Oastea Domnului (the Lord's Army), a spiritual renewal movement of lay volunteers as well as clerics, associated with the Romanian Orthodox Church. The organization was outlawed during the communist rule; his pseudonym was Simion Cubolta.

In April 1957, he married Nicoleta Valeria Bruteanu (1919–96), a graduate of Bucharest Conservatory, relative of Iuliu Maniu and former political detainee. The Romanian movie Binecuvântată fii, închisoare (Bless you, prison) and the book Prisoner Rejoice recount the story of Nicoleta Valeria Bruteanu's grueling years of detention by the Romanian Communist Regime. On 7 March 1959 Grossu was arrested and sentenced to 12 years in prison for his activity in Oastea Domnului. He was pardoned in 1962. The communist dictatorship then denied him all but manual employment.

Sergiu Grossu and his wife migrated to France in 1969. There they founded the "Catacombes" publishing house, the association "La Chaine" and served as editors of the monthly magazine Catacombes (1971–92). He hosted the radio show "Lumea creștină" on Radio Free Europe, and lectured in Paris, Bordeaux, Versailles, Besançon, Dieppe, Tours, Blois, Poitiers, Nantes, Brest, Toulouse, Lyon &c.

On 18 January 1996, after 27 years in exile, Sergiu Grossu returned for good to Bucharest, bringing with him the mortal remains of his wife. In Bucharest, he founded Fundația Foștilor Deținuți Politici "Nicoleta Valeria Grossu", the publishing house "Duh și Adevăr", and the association "Centrul de cultură creștină Nicoleta Valeria Grossu."

In Chișinău Sergiu Grossu founded Centrul internațional de cultură pentru copii și tineret "Sergiu Grossu" and sponsored the creation of the Muzeul Memoriei Neamului, led by his former classmate Vadim Pirogan.

== Honours ==
- Premiul concursului de creație literar-creștin "Sergiu Grossu"
- Centrul internațional de cultură pentru copii și tineret "Sergiu Grossu"

== Works ==
- Grossu, Sergiu (1940), Muștar (in Romanian).
- Lanțul, poems, 1971
- O rază de soare, poems, 1971
- Pietre de aducere aminte, poems, 1971
- La Chaine – 1971 Paris
- Un rayon de soleil – 1971 Paris
- ziarul "Catacombes"- 1971, editat timp de 20 de ani
- Catacombes 1973 (Almanach de l'Église de Silence), 1973, Éditions Catacombes
- Câmpurile de muncă în URSS, 1975
- Derrière le rideau de bambou (de Mao Tsé-toung à Fidel Castro), 1975, Éditions Catacombes, Paris
- La Technique du regard în Promesses - Revue de réflexions bibliques, N°15, Jul–Sep 1975
- The Church in today's catacombs, Arlington House, USA, 1976
- Grassu, Sergiu (1996) [1976, Éditions Catacombes], Vania Moisséieff, Le jeune martyr de Volontirovka, Paris: Apostolat des Editions.
- Infernul chinez, 1976
- Au fond de l'abîme (Le règne de la haine), 1976, Éditions Apostolat des Éditions, Paris
- Les Enfants du Goulag (Chronique de l'enfance opprimé en URSS), 1979, France-Empire, Paris.
- ——— (1987), Le calvaire de Roumanie Chrétienne, France-Empire
- ——— (1998) [1988], Maîtresse, Dieu existe! Les enfants dans l'étau de l'athéisme soviétique [Teacher, God exists! Children in Sovietic Atheism] (in French), Paris: Fayard.
- ——— (2006) [1992, Convorbiri literare - ABC DAVA], Calvarul României creștine (in Romanian), Vremea.
- Inscripții pe un vas de lut – 1994, ed. Roza vânturilor
- În șfichiul ironiei – 1996, ed. Hrisova, Bucuresti
- În așteptarea unui pământ nou – 1998, ed. Duh și Adevăr
- Îmi bate inima la Bug, ed. Museum, Chișinău, 2000
- Apocalipsiada
- ——— (2002), Berthoud, Jean-Marc (ed.), L'Église persécutée, entre goulag & société opulente; chronique de deux Roumains à Paris, "Catacombes", septembre 1971-décembre 1992 [The persecuted Church, between the gulag and the oppulent society: chronicle of two Rumanians in Paris, "Catacombs", Septembre 1971 – December 1992] (paperback), Messages, Lausanne: L'Age d'homme, ISBN 978-2-82511735-4.
- Plaidoyer pour L'Église du Silence, Ed. Resiac, 2003
- Calendarul persecuției religioase în țările comuniste, 2003

== Bibliography ==
- Sergiu Grossu, Calvarul României creștine, "Convorbiri Literare" - ABC DAVA, 1992.
