= Emilian Galaicu-Păun =

Author

Emilian Galaicu-Păun OR
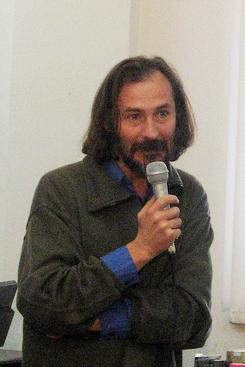
- Galaicu-Păun in 2011
- Born: 22 June 1964 (age 62); Unchiteşti, Moldavian SSR, Soviet Union
- Citizenship: Moldova, Romania
- Education: Maxim Gorky Literature Institute
- Occupation: Editor
- Known for: His activity as an author

Emilian Galaicu-Păun (22 June 1964) is a Moldovan author and editor, member of the Writers' Union of Romania and the Writers' Union of Moldova.

== Works ==
- Lumina proprie, Editura Literatura Artistică, Chișinău, 1986
- Abece-Dor, Editura Literatura Artistică, Chișinău, 1989
- Levitații deasupra hăului, Editura Hyperion, Chișinău, 1991
- Cel bătut îl duce pe cel nebătut, Editura Dacia, Cluj, 1994
- Gesturi. Trilogia nimicului, Editura Cartier, Chișinău, 1996
- Yin Time, Editura Vinea, București, 1999
- Poezia de după poezie. Ultimul deceniu, Editura Cartier, Chișinău, 1999
- Gestuar, Editura Axa, Botoșani, 2002
- Arme grăitoare, Editura Cartier, Chișinău, 2009
- Țesut viu. 10 x 10, Editura Cartier, Chisinău, 2011.
  - Living Tissue, 10x10, trans. Alistair Ian Blyth (Dalkey Archive, 2020)
- A-Z.best, Editura ARC, Chisinău, 2012
- A(II)Rh+eu, Editura Cartier, Chișinău, 2019
- Apa.3D, Editura Cartier, Chișinău, 2019
- Cărțile pe care le-am citit, cărțile care m-au scris, Editura Junimea, Iași, 2020
- sanG d'encre, Editura Cartier, Chișinău, 2020

=== Compilations in English ===
- Canting Arms: Poems, trans. Adam J. Sorkin (Phoneme Media, 2024). Selected poems 1989–2019.
