= Magda Isanos =

Romanian poet (1916–1944)

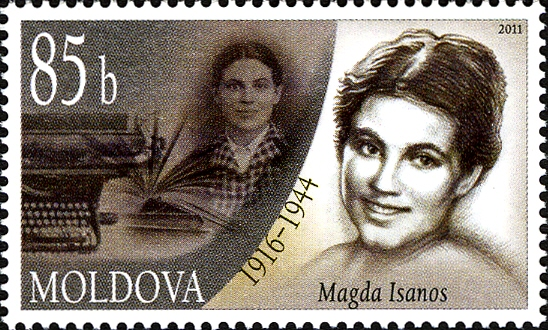
Isanos on a postage stamp of Moldova (2011)

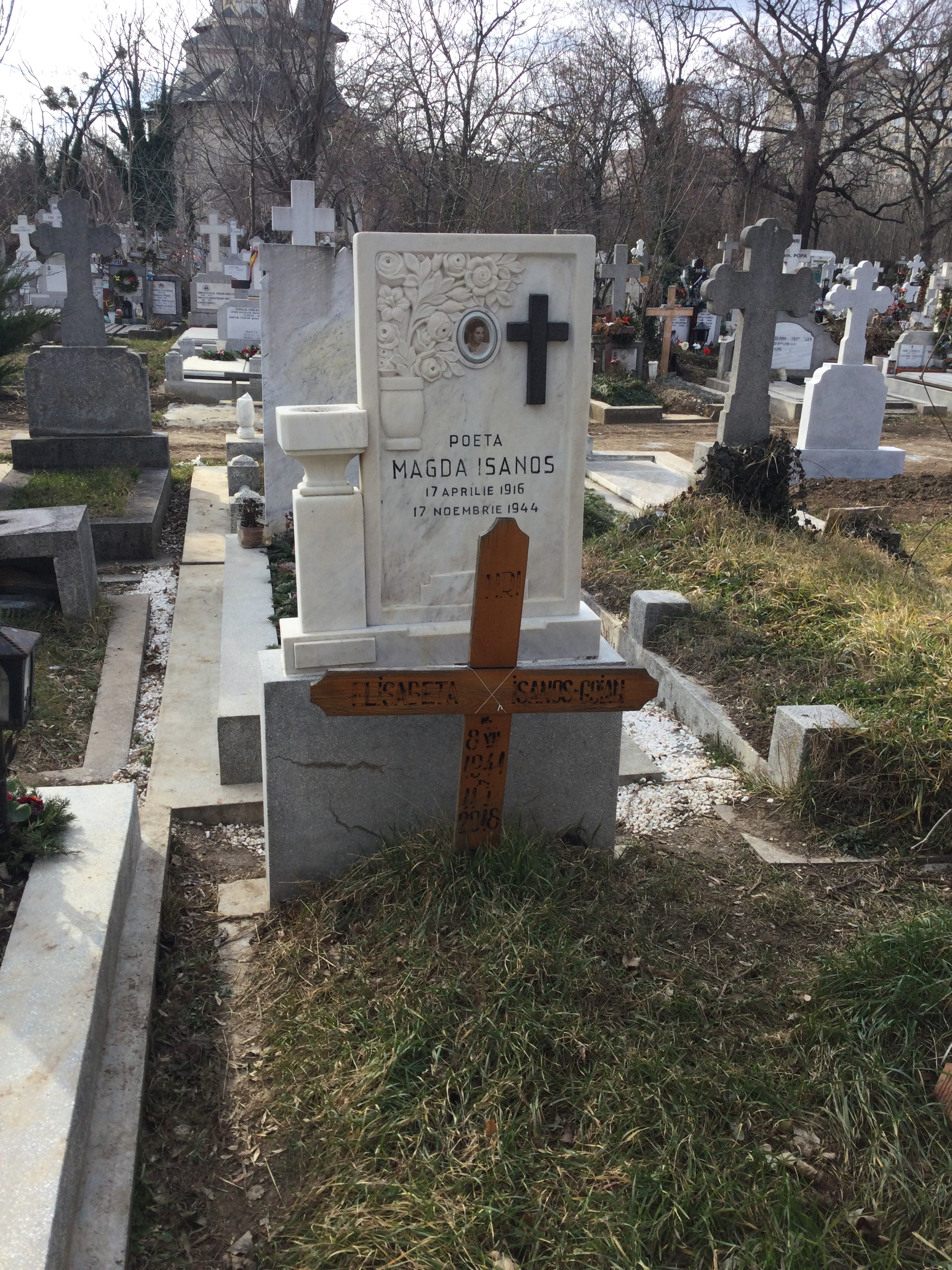
Grave at Bellu Cemetery

Magda Isanos (17 April 1916 – 17 November 1944) was a Romanian poet.

== Biography ==
Born in Iași, her parents were Mihail Isanos and his wife Elisabeta (née Bălan), doctors at the Costiugeni psychiatric hospital near Chișinău. Elisabeta was the sister of Elena Alistar. After graduating from the Diocesan High School in Chișinău, Magda entered the law faculty of the University of Iași in 1934. While there, she was affiliated with left-wing student societies. After graduating, Isanos briefly worked as a lawyer in Iași. She was married to the writer Eusebiu Camilar.

Isanos made her published debut in 1932, in Licurici magazine. Her work appeared in Însemnări ieșene, Iașul, Jurnalul literar, Viața Basarabiei, Pagini basarabene, Vremea, Cuget moldovenesc, Revista Fundațiilor Regale and Viața Românească. She died in Bucharest at age 28 after a long illness and period of awaiting the end. Obsessively returning to the theme of death, her grave, musical verses (Poezii, 1943) hover between despair and euphoria. Her lyric verses were collected into posthumous anthologies: Țara luminii (1946), Poezii (1947), Versuri (1955), Versuri (1964), Poezii (1974). She was awarded the debut prize of Editura Fundației Regale pentru Literatură și Artă for her four-act drama Focurile. Written in collaboration with her husband, the play was published posthumously in 1945.

Isanos' work is featured in the anthology; Virginia's Sisters (2023).
