= Nicolai Costenco =

Moldovan writer and journalist (1913–1993)

Nicolai Costenco OR
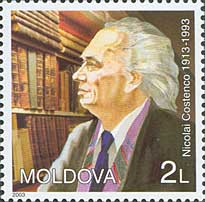
- 2003 stamp of Moldova
- Born: December 21, 1913; Chişinău
- Died: July 29, 1993 (aged 79); Chişinău
- Known for: Poet
- Spouse: Maria Costenco
- Children: Nicolae, Marina-Mimi, Tatiana, Constantin, Tudor, Ilyana
- Parent(s): Maria lui Gheorghe Leahu, Şiodor Costenco
- Relatives: Anatol Păduraru (brother)
- Awards: Premiul de Stat al Republicii Moldova (1988)

Nicolai Costenco (21 December 1913 – 29 July 1993) was a writer from Moldova. He was managing editor of Viaţa Basarabiei (1934–1940) and was deported to Siberia în 1941.

== Biography ==
Nicolai Costenco was born in Chişinău on December 21, 1913, but his maternal grandparents, Gheorghe and Libeada, brought him up in Cihoreni. He worked for Viaţa Basarabiei (1934–1940). In 1941 he was deported to Siberia because he claimed that there is no difference between the Moldovan language and the Romanian language. In his poem, "Pictează-mi o mirişte", Grigore Vieru wrote: "Nicolai Costenco, poetul/ Care şi-a scris poemele/ Pe caietul de gheaţă Siberian"...

== Awards ==
- Premiul de Stat al Republicii Moldova (1988).

== Works ==
- Poezii (1937),
- Ore (1939),
- Cleopatra (1939).
- Severograd, 1963,
- Norocul omului, 1965),
- Serghei Lazo, 1967),
- Poezii alese (1957),
- Poezii noi (1960),
- Versuri (1963),
- Mugur, mugurel (1967),
- Poezii si poeme (1969),
- Poezii si poeme (1983),
- Euritmii (1990),
- Elegii pagane (1998).

== Bibliography ==
- Timpul de dimineaţă, Un scriitor al rezistenţei şi al continuităţii: Nicolai Costenco (1913–1993), 2004. – 5 ian.
- Mihai Cimpoi, "Alte disocieri", Chapter Nicolai Costenco, Chişinău, Ed. Cartea moldoveneasca, 1971.
- Vasile Badiu, Eroul traditional in ipostaze noi. In cartea: Eroul con temporan in literatura moldoveneasca, Chişinău, Ed. Stiinta, 1972.
- Mihail Dolgan, Sunt cetacean al tarii poeziei. In cartea lui: Crez si maiestrie artistica, Chişinău, Ed. Cartea moldoveneasca, 1982; Lirica din perioada exilului siberian. In Literatura si arta, 1995, 26 ianuarie.
- Ion Ciocanu, Cetatean al tarii poeziei. In cartea: Nicolai Costenco, Euritmii, Chişinău, Ed. Hyperion, 1990.
- George Calinescu, Istoria literaturii romane de la origini pana in prezent, p. 1031.
- Grigore Vieru, "PICTEAZA-MI O MIRISTE" ("Nicolai Costenco, poetul/ Care şi-a scris poemele/ Pe caietul de gheaţă Siberian")
