= George Meniuc =

Moldovan writer (1918–1987)

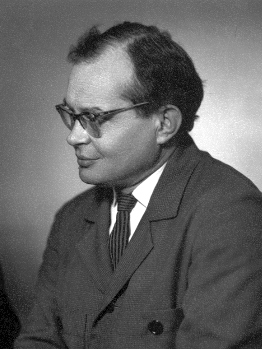
- Meniuc in 1940
- Born: 20 May 1918; Chişinău, Moldova
- Died: 8 February 1987 (aged 76); Chişinău, Moldova
- Resting place: Chişinău
- Education: University of Bucharest
- Political party: Communist Party of the Soviet Union (1953–1987)
- Other political affiliations: Union of Communist Youth (before 1940)

George Meniuc (20 May 1918 – 8 February 1987) was a writer from Moldova.

== Biography ==
George Meniuc was born on 20 May 1918, in Chişinău. He graduated from the University of Bucharest; his professors were Tudor Vianu, Petre P. Negulescu, Dimitrie Gusti, Mircea Florian. In 1940, he returned to Chişinău George Meniuc was editor in chief of Nistru, a newspaper of the Moldovan Writers' Union.

George Meniuc died on 8 February 1987 and was buried in Chişinău.

== Awards ==
- Premiul de Stat al RSSM pentru literatură, 1972.
- "Scriitor al poporului din Moldova", 1982.

== Works ==
Poems:

- Cântecul zorilor (1948)
- Poezii (1954)
- Strofe lirice (1956)
- Poeme (1957)
- Versuri alese (1958)
- Vremea Lerului (1969),
- Florile dalbe (1979),
- Toamna lui Orfeu (1983).

Essays:

- Imaginea în artă (1940),
- Iarba fiarelor (1959),
- Cadran solar (1966),
- Eseuri (1967).
- Vulpea isteaţă, Editura Prut Internaţional, Chişinău; ISBN 9975-69-354-7

== Bibliography ==
- Anatol Eremia, Unitatea patrimoniului onomastic românesc. Toponimie. Antroponimie ediţie jubiliară, 2001, Centrul Naţional de Terminologie, ed. „Iulian”, Chişinău, ISBN 9975-922-45-7.
