= Bogdan Istru =

Bogdan Istru, pseudonym of Ion Bădărău (April 13, [O.S. March 31,] 1914 – March 25, 1993) was a Moldovan poet, a representative of proletculture.

In 1931, he graduated from "Vasile Lupu" Normal (teacher-training) School of Iași, after which he worked as a teacher. Since 1932 he started publishing folk songs, anecdotes and riddles recorded in the newspaper "Moldovan word". He then started writing poems. Until occupying Bessarabia by the USSR in 1940, he had already published two volumes, both mentioned by George Călinescu in "The History of Romanian Literature from Origin to Present". The great literary critic characterizes Bogdan Istru as: "After the Barbian experiences, he moved to Arghezi's manner in which he is more sure in expressing his original note consisting of a wild invasion of shadows".

During the war and in the post-war years, he became a member of the CPSU in 1947 and was remarked by lyrics dedicated to the Communist Party through the cycle of poems about the Volga–Don Canal, Moldova socialist transformation, the struggle of the people against the fascist invaders, the images of contemporary heroes In the poems such as Voice of the Country ("Vocea Patriei") (1946), Pohoarnele (1947), The Lead ("La frunte") (1951), From coast to the coast ("De la țărm la țărm") (1953), Spring in the Carpathians ("Primăvara în Carpați") (1955), Tatar-Bunar (1958) . His lyrics have been translated into the languages of the USSR republics and other foreign languages.

He wrote poetry, notably in the book Halts ("Popasuri") (1989). A selection of his poems was re-edited in the Blue Bird ("Pasărea Albastră") volume (1991).

Bogdan Istrud was awarded the State Award of the Republic of Moldova (1976) for the poetry "Tatar-Bunar", about the Tatarbunary Uprising in 1924. In 1984, he was elected as a correspondent member of the Academy of Sciences of Moldova. He was awarded two Soviet medals.
