= Moldovan Writers' Union =

Writers' Union of Moldova
- Uniunea Scriitorilor din Republica Moldova
- Founder: Mozes Kahana (first chairman)
- Headquarters: Chişinău
- Location: Moldova
- Members: Over 200 (2026)
- President: Teo Chiriac
- Key people: Mihai Cimpoi
- Website: uniuneascriitorilor.md

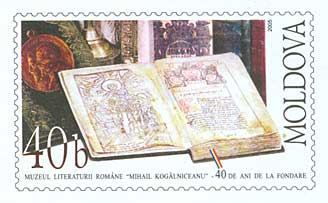
Romanian Literature Museum, Chişinău

The Writers' Union of Moldova (Romanian: Uniunea Scriitorilor din Republica Moldova) is a professional association of writers in Moldova.

== Presidents ==
Mihai Cimpoi was the president of the Writers' Union of Moldova between 1991 and 2010. As of 2026, the president is Teo Chiriac, elected in 2021. The vice president is Ivan Pilchin.
