= Pavel Chioru =

Soviet Moldovan politician and writer

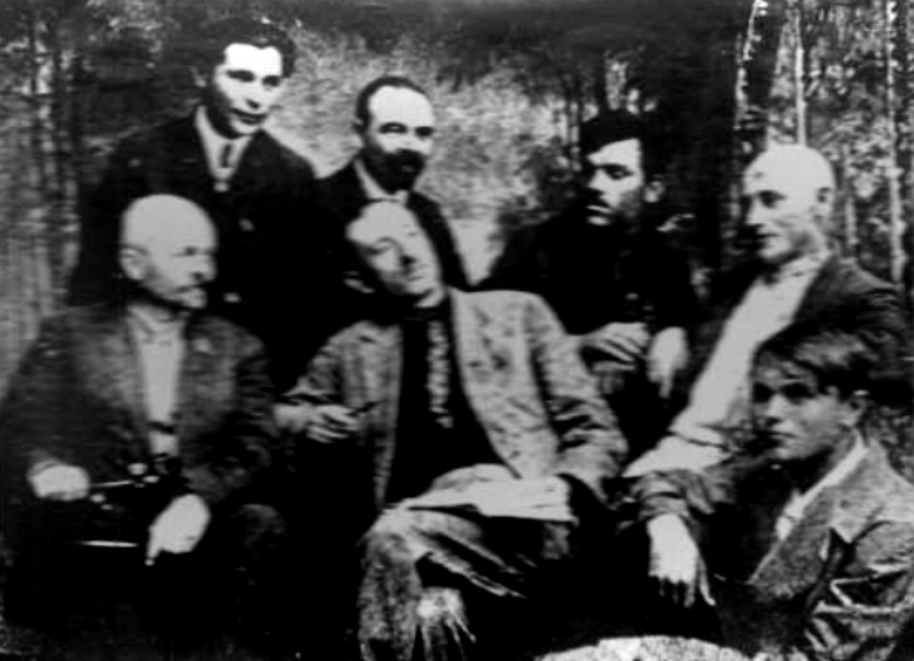
- Chioru (reclining, at center) with fellow writers, including Mihai Andriescu, Samuil Lehtțir, and Dmitrii Milev, c. 1930

People's Commissar for Education of the Moldavian Autonomous Soviet Socialist Republic
- In office 1928–1930

Personal details
- Born: Pavel Ivanovici Chioru-Ianachi; 2 April 1902 Cartal, Bessarabia Governorate, Russian Empire
- Died: Disputed (between 1937 and 1943)
- Party: Communist Party of the Soviet Union (1919–1937)
- Other political affiliations: Communist Party of Ukraine (Moldavia Regional Committee)

Pavel Chioru, Chior, or Kior, known in full as Pavel Ivanovici Chioru-Ianachi (Russian: Павел Иванович Киор-Янаки, or Павел Кьору; 2 April 1902 – c. 1937), was a Moldovan journalist, folklorist, and Soviet politician. He was among the Bessarabian youths who rejected that region's union with Romania, and consequently fled into the Ukrainian Soviet Socialist Republic, where he joined his communist father. Chioru Jr served in the Red Army and the Cheka, seeing action in the Russian Civil War; training as a political commissar, and known to the leadership of the Communist Party (CPSU), he emerged from the war as an author of Soviet propaganda with literary and musical preoccupations. His father became a founding figure of the Moldavian Autonomous Soviet Socialist Republic (MASSR), established in Ukrainian territory as a statement of Soviet territorial claims on Bessarabia; though Chioru Sr died in 1926, his son continued his political work, moving to Balta.

Chioru personally handled some of the core institutions of Soviet "Moldovenism"—a doctrine which held that Moldovans (or Moldavians) are fundamentally distinct from Romanians. These include the newspaper Plugarul Roșu, the literary magazine Moldova Literarî, and the local Writers' Union. Chioru was MASSR Commissar for Education between 1928 and 1930, and in this capacity worked to create a "Moldovan language" of the proletariat, principally by overstating differences between the Moldavian dialect and modern Romanian. He edited Gavril Buciușcan's dictionary, which stood as a moderate sample of Moldovenism, but around 1929 took personal charge of the project, endorsing in-depth cultural separatism through Russification of the vocabulary. In the earliest 1930s, Chioru was again moderating his outlook, recommending a literary language that was mostly influenced by the archaic dialect. This made him interested in selectively cultivating the classics of Romanian literature, Vasile Alecsandri and Mihai Eminescu. He earned attention in Greater Romania for his research into folklore, and was seen there as an unwitting champion of Romanian nationalism.

In 1932, Chioru backed the Soviet Latinization campaigns, whereby the Romanian alphabet was effectively adopted by the MASSR. His cultural activism was largely put on hold by 1934, when he took political offices in Rîbnița District and was possibly groomed to become a leader of the MASSR. This stint ended abruptly during the Great Purge, when he was labeled as a Romanian nationalist and Trotskyist. Expelled from the CPSU in March 1937, he was sentenced to death in October. He is known to have received a stay of execution, but his ultimate fate remains unclear. Official narratives, circulated at the height of De-Stalinization, have it that he died in the Gulag in 1943; they are questioned by authors who argue that he was more likely shot before the end of 1937.

== Biography ==
=== Origins and early career ===
Chioru was a native of Cartal village in southern Bessarabia; at the time, the area was in the Bessarabia Governorate of the Russian Empire, through Izmailsky Uyezd (now in Ukraine's Izmail Raion). His exact birth date, according to later scholarship, is 2 April 1902. His father, known in Romanian as Ivan Nicolaievici Chior-Ionache and in Russian as Ivan Nikolaevich Kior-Yanaki, was a figure of importance in the regional Bolshevik movement, helping to organize the communist network in Yekaterinoslav. Pavel was a musically gifted child, who went on to perform in amateur choirs, as well as becoming a multi-instrumentalist (he could play the piano, the button accordion, the mandolin, and the Jew's harp). He is known to have been enrolled at Bolhrad High School around the time when Bessarabia achieved independence as the Moldavian Democratic Republic.

He left the region in 1918, as it united with Romania. He swam across the Dniester and volunteered for service in the Red Army, seeing action in the Russian Civil War. Settling for a while in Soviet Russia, Pavel was welcomed into the all-Russian Communist Party (future CPSU) in 1919, and then joining his father in Yekaterinoslav; here, he was assigned to the communist secret police, Cheka, serving as such between 1920 and 1922. Chioru Jr graduated from Sverdlov Communist University in Moscow in 1924. He appeared as a singer of folk melodies for a number of benefit concerts, gathering funds for survivors of the Volga famine. From 1924, Chioru's father was mainly active in Soviet Ukraine, joining the Ukrainian Bolshevik Party's regional committee in Odesa, and then being welcomed into the Central Executive Committee of the Soviet Union. He was also called upon to help establish the subordinate MASSR, located just west of that city, but only to April 1926, when he died at Kislovodsk. In 1924–1925, Chioru Jr returned to the Red Army as a political commissar among the Red Cossacks. He then emerged as first secretary of the Ukrainian Komsomol's chapter in the newly formed Moldavian polity; this period saw his first contributions to Soviet propaganda, the brochures Что такое комсомол ("What Is the Komsomol?", 1925) and Наша смена – пионе-ры ("Our Shift: The Pioneers", 1926).

Upon settling in Balta, Chioru helped establish the newspaper Plugarul Roșu, serving as its editor in chief, and became MASSR People's Commissar for Education, in which capacity he helped establish the Writers' Union. He was probably the main literary contributor at Plugarul Roșu, with a column named Ungherașul poeziei norodnice moldovenești ("Little Corner of Moldavian People's Poetry"), later Pagina Literarî ("Literary Page"). It eventually became a standalone magazine, Moldova Literarî ("Literary Moldavia")—unusual in its Soviet context for being editorially independent. His arrival came at a time when the MASSR's professional intellectuals were dividing into Romanianizers and Moldovenizers. As noted by the Russian scholar Oleg Grom, the former group, who still enjoyed relative supremacy, did not regard Romanians and Moldovans as distinguished by ethnicity, as much as by class: "'Romanians' in this interpretation are, first of all, boyars and capitalists who 'fooled' their own people". Moldovenizers, instead, actively strove to create a "Moldovan language", hoping to transform class consciousness into a new ethnic nationalism. Chioru's own interest in the linguistic field led him to serve as publisher of a Russian–Moldovan dictionary, compiled by Gavril Buciușcan in 1926; he shared editorial credits with writer Dmitrii Milev. Reviewing this contribution, historian Marius Tărîță notes that, though maintaining a localized Cyrillic script, it did not yet endorse claims that "Moldovan" was wholly distinct from Romanian.

=== Language creation ===
Chioru's experiment with language began in September 1926, when he was assigned as director of the MASSR Scientific Committee—this institute only had one functioning section, dedicated to linguistics and led by the grammarian Leonid Madan. Looking back on this activity some four years later, Chioru argued that Romanian was not just different from Moldovan, but also "incomprehensible" to speakers of the latter (though he also reported his annoyance that many inhabitants of the MASSR, including "very esteemed scientific cadres", "believe that the Moldovan and Romanian languages are one and the same"). He served as Commissar for Education between 1928 and 1930, when, as philologist Vasile Bahnaru notes, he argued for the political channeling of linguistics; he supported an emphasis on the differences between the archaic Moldavian dialect and the modernized Romanian language, proposing that the communists could engineer a Moldovan language out of the former; on this basis, Chioru suggested that Romanian was a language of the "exploiters", whereas Moldovan was one for the "exploited". He took personal charge of the project, superseding Buciușcan's dictionary with his own works in lexicography and a tract, Dispri orfografia linghii moldovinești (appearing at Bîrzu in 1929); "either by the choice of Chior or through additions and alterations by the editors", these recommended a Russified lexis, with terms such as soiuz for "union" (instead of the Romanian unire).

In his report of November 1929, Chioru asserted that creating new languages was an all-Union process, involving many other Soviet languages; in his introduction to one of Madan's handbooks, he denounced Buciușcan's standard as too Romanian. In terms of orthography, Chioru favored revamping Cyrillic with direct borrowings from the Russian alphabet—including я and ю—arguing that this was a "democratic, simplified and scientific" approach. Reviewing his contribution, linguist Anatol Lența observes that it "completely changed" the familiar standards of the Romanian Cyrillic alphabet, being conducive of Russification. Chioru and Milev endorsed Madan, who also invited writers to fabricate a "Moldavian socialist" lexis. With I. Cușmăunsă, they co-wrote an appeal which argued that: "We have no need for Romanian literary grammar, since that sort of grammar would completely stifle our Moldavian language" (Ноауы ну ни требуи граматикы литерары ромыниаскы кэч ку ашэ граматикы ной ом ынабушы ди тэт лимба ноастры молдовинясы).

In 1930, Chioru acknowledged that he was more interested in creating a "mother tongue" and "living language", rather than a full-blown Moldovan literary language; he also reported being uninterested in the historical background of the MASSR vernacular, simply describing the topic as "difficult". Once he switched focus toward literary expression, he moderated his stance, favoring old Romanian sources and a reliance on the speech patterns of his native Bessarabia—thereby isolating himself from other activists, who wanted a language based on the comparatively exotic speech patterns of Dubăsari. Chioru also admired the Romanian folklorist Vasile Alecsandri, wishing to imitate his work in the field. He repeatedly urged all local communists to become well acquainted with what he termed "Moldavian literature", and also to promote it in the villages.

As noted by ethnographer Maria Ciocanu, Chioru's own activity "the first Soviet Moldovan folklorist" was colored by his other identity, that of a "combative Marxist ideologue". His research of Romanian folklore, including the 1927 book Zicătoarele moldovenești ("Moldavian Sayings"), only compiled that which "agreed with Soviet ideology". His output as a musicologist included a book of "revolutionary songs", co-written alongside the composer Mihail Bak and printed at Balta at an unknown date (possibly in the late 1920s). Chioru had personally handled their translation into Russian, and had written down the corresponding musical scores, expressing a hope that choirs would be formed "in every village". The book unusually featured a Romanian nationalist anthem, Hora Unirii, presented here as the "Hora of the Workers".

In 1928, Chioru became involved in the Moldovanization campaign, announced by Iosif Badeev as a standard policy of the Moldavian Communist Regional Committee (Obkom). Both Badeev and Chioru explained that the Soviet Union was preparing for war with the Kingdom of Romania, and stood to conquer Bessarabia (defined as "an inalienable part of Soviet Moldavia"). When he asked for the literary standard to be based on the core Bessarabian dialect, he noted that such a choice "would facilitate the national liberation of all Moldovans." Chioru advocated Moldovenization as a "grand rehearsal", at the end of which MASSR "cadres" would be ready to "pass into Bessarabia" and take over its administration. Despite the revolutionary content of Zicătoarele (including the cover featuring the proletarian-internationalist slogan, "Workers of the world, unite!"), he found himself criticized for including samples from throughout the region of Moldavia (including Western Moldavia), as well as an adaptation of lyrics by Mihai Eminescu. Historian Petru Negură believes that Chioru, like his fellow writer Samuil Lehtțir, either did not know, or pretended not to know, that Eminescu's poetry was not peasant folklore. The Chioru collection earned praise from the refugee anti-communist scholar, Nichita Smochină, who noted that he had transported Alecsandri's standards into the MASSR, while at the same time introducing Romanians to Moldavian folklore from as far afield as the Caucasus.

=== Downfall and posterity ===
Chioru's toned-down approach, which included finding linguistic inspiration in the chronicles of the old Moldavian principality, earned praise from a fellow communist leader, Ion Ocinschi. The latter recalled that Chioru had also authored a dictionary, which was in itself "progressive, and had a positive role" (despite the author being "poorly prepared"). Criticized by others for his approach to Moldovanization, Chioru justified himself as backed by Korenizatsiia. In a June 1928 letter to Lazar Kaganovich, who was serving as the Ukrainian First Secretary, Chioru explained: "I see Ukrainization as no worse than Moldovanization, for example, and I will carry out 'Georgianization' no less than a Georgian if I am sent to work in Georgia tomorrow, because the understanding of this need was instilled in me by the party as a school of revolution". By 1931, he and Madan had refined their approach to the issues of orthography and lexicography. They still maintained focus on the "democratic" nature of the resulting standard, but criticized wholesale Russian adoptions, to which they preferred consecrated Romanian terms. In some instances, Chioru followed the Romanian Academy standard, but criticized Romanian communist emigrants to the MASSR for their usage of Frenchified terms. From 1932, Chioru was an enthusiastic supporter of Soviet Latinization campaigns, which effectively brought the Romanian alphabet into the MASSR.

Historian Valeria Chelaru sees this period as marking a decisive shift in Soviet policy: consolidating his ideological command, Joseph Stalin was now slowly turning away from Korenizatsiia and "local nationalism", favoring Soviet patriotism. Moreover: "According to some participants in the events, the initiative for Latinization and rapprochement of Moldovan and Romanian cultures came from Stalin himself." It was as a result of this transition, and also because of the perceived failures of Moldovan nationalism, that Chioru lost his position at the Scientific Committee in 1931. His immediate successor was Ochinschi, who proceeded to attack Madan as an alleged "counter-revolutionary", and demanded that Latinization be pursued alongside lexical diversification; as Chelaru notes: "Briefly, the new official language in the MASSR was in no way different than the language spoken in Romania." During the peak of such campaigns, Chioru was absent from the republic, having been sent to Moscow. As argued by historian Oleg Galushenko, he was possibly being considered for a high-ranking position in the MASSR's administrative apparatus. Ochinschi reports that Chioru was made to undergo self-criticism, and was in Moscow to receive ideological retraining.

Upon his return in 1934, Chioru was made secretary of the Moldavian Obkom in Rîbnița District. Still invested in the promotion of Moldovan folklore, he made a point of attending performances by a locally famous Lăutar, Gheorghe Murgu. The Latinization policy was swiftly reverted ahead of the Great Purge, with its supporters sidelined as suspects—and accused of harboring Romanian nationalism. Chioru himself was brought down, being simultaneously described as an agent of pro-Romanian and Trotskyist circles. The writer was expelled from the party on 20 March 1937. This decision came directly from the All-Union Politburo—the only time in history that the Politburo involved itself in the demotion of a MASSR provincial cadre. Chioru was arrested by the NKVD in either June or August (all other Plugarul Roșu staff members had been similarly rounded up during one night). During his interrogation, he and Ivan Krivorukov both "confessed to having been part of a nationalistic plot" led by the disgraced communist Grigore Starîi.

Later biographies often report that Chioru was then deported to the Siberian Gulag, and that he died there in 1943, aged 41. Scholar Iurie Colesnic notes that this was a purposeful misdirection by Soviet authorities, who, during De-Stalinization, had come to see the Great Purge as embarrassing. As recorded by Colesnic, Chioru was in fact shot by the NKVD at Tiraspol, on 11 October 1937; this account is partly credited by Galushenko, who notes that the purported death sentence was handed out on 8 October. Historians Gheorghe Negru and Mihail Tașcă validate the latter date, but also note that on Chioru and Badeev, alongside 16 others death-row inmates, actually received a stay of execution on 11 October, through a decision made by Nikolai Yezhov. Smochină recorded claims that copies of Chioru's works had been burned by the Soviet authorities, since they showed a "spiritual unity of Romanians across all the lands."

== Legacy ==
Chioru's sentencing took place less than three years before the Soviet occupation of Bessarabia, which united most of the MASSR with formerly Romanian territory, establishing the Chișinău-centered Moldavian Soviet Socialist Republic. De-Stalinization in this new polity also signaled Chioru's rehabilitation, which allowed him to be recognized as a founder of the Writers' Union in all of Soviet Moldavia. Interrogated by the KGB during the Khrushchev Thaw, Ocinschi expressed his appreciation for his predecessor: "A communist man, Chior had actively fought to maintain the general party line." This newer regime promoted Chioru's surviving son, Georgy Pavlovich Kior, who served as manager of Cuciurgan power station. In the 1960s, Ivan Bodiul, who presided upon the Communist Party of Moldavia, encouraged reprints of works by Chioru and other writers lost to the Great Purge, reportedly prioritizing this project over any book by a Bessarabian Romanian classic. Such elevation was mocked in a dissenting epigram, produced by Arhip Cibotaru; it noted that Moldovan literature was entirely developed by, and dependent on, two Soviet activists with the same first name: Pavel Chioru and Pavel Boțu.

Following the Perestroika liberalization of the mid-to-late 1980s, Chioru's clashes with official ideologies became a matter of public record. In January 1989, Moldova Socialistă featured an article by cultural promoter Sergiu Cucuietu, which was focused on Stalinist victim Nistor Cabac, but also explored the physical destruction of Chioru and others from the MASSR elite. As noted by Cucuietu, these men and women had been "killed off", "together with our literary language and our Latin alphabet." In 1990, Chișinău History Museum was allowed to feature an exhibit commemorating the victims of Stalinism. It included a portrait of Chioru, crediting him as a deportee, rather than as an execution victim. Writing in 2021, Galushenko argued that Chioru's contributions in folklore studies "have retained their scientific significance to this day."
