= Dmitrii Milev =

Moldovan short-story writer and communist militant (1887–1937)

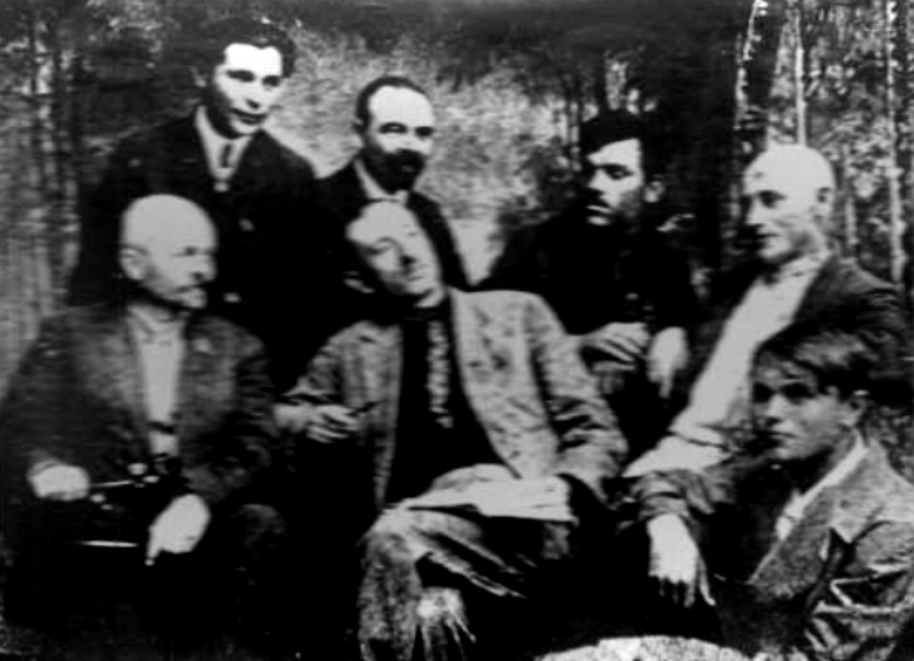
- Milev (top right) with fellow writers, including Mihai Andriescu, Samuil Lehtțir, and Pavel Chioru
- Born: Dmitrii Petrovici Milev; January 2, 1887; Baurci-Moldoveni, Bessarabia Governorate, Russian Empire (now Moldova)
- Died: October 13, 1937 (aged 50); Tiraspol, Moldavian Autonomous Soviet Socialist Republic, Soviet Union (now Transnistria)
- Occupations: Politician; soldier; translator
- Writing career
- Period: c. 1926–1937
- Genres: Lyric poetry; sketch story; essay; political drama
- Literary movement: Proletarian literature; Marxist literary criticism

Dmitrii or Dumitru Petrovici Milev (Moldovan Cyrillic and Russian: Дмитрий Петрович Милев, romanized: Dmitry Petrovich Milev; January 2, 1887 – October 13, 1937) was a Bessarabian-born short-story writer and communist militant, active in the Soviet Union's Moldavian Autonomous Republic (MASSR). During World War I, he served as an officer in the Imperial Russian Army, and was decorated for bravery. Already sympathetic to socialist ideas, he embraced the Bolshevik ideology around the time of the October Revolution; he was strongly opposed to Greater Romania, and, after the Romanian–Bessarabian unification, foght in the Bolshevik underground. Arrested and indicted in 1919, he escaped custody and helped prepare the Tatarbunary Uprising. Upon its quashing, Milev made his way into the Ukrainian Soviet Socialist Republic, which was a cradle for Moldovenism and the MASSR.

Though originating from a community of Bessarabian Bulgarians, Milev identified with the Moldavian (Moldovan) ethnicity, which he viewed as distinct from the Romanians. More controversially, he advocated for a "Moldavian language", which he used in his contributions to proletarian literature—and which later scholarship regarded as "gibberish". He was upheld as the MASSR's first short-story writer, as well as a pioneer translator. Working alongside Samuil Lehtțir, he helped establish the MASSR's cultural institutions, and served as president of the Moldavian Union of Writers. Advancing through the ranks of the Ukrainian Communist (Bolshevik) Party, he had contributions to both land collectivization and the literacy campaign. His short prose was a contribution to Soviet propaganda, focusing mainly on depicting the Romanian Kingdom as a bourgeois or fascist polity, which terrorized its "Moldavian" peasants and the Bessarabian Jews.

Milev was explicit in his critique of Soviet Latinization, but later renounced Cyrillic and adapted himself to the Soviet version of the Romanian alphabet. He was still identified as a Latinizer, and therefore a Romanian-financed saboteur, with the onset of the Great Purge. Milev was shocked by these developments, and maintained his friendship with disgraced figures—including Grigore Starîi, who joined him in translating the 1936 Soviet Constitution. After a period of uncertainty, in which he was allowed to reprise his literary work (but lost all political privileges), he was arrested and tortured by the NKVD cell at Tiraspol. He confessed to being a spy, then recanted, but was still put to death in that city's prison. Within twenty years of this event, de-Stalinization had him rehabilitated, and included among the founders of Moldovan literature. Milev's posthumous vindication was used by young authors in the Moldavian Soviet Socialist Republic to push for more creative liberties.

== Biography ==
=== Early life and activities ===
Milev was born on January 2, 1887, at Baurci-Moldoveni, in what was then Izmailsky Uyezd, in Imperial Russia's Bessarabia Governorate. Romanian scholar Nichita Smochină reports his ethnicity as Bulgarian, noting that he was "from a wealthy family." By contrast, an official biography, panned in 1959 by V. Tolochenko, had it that: "His parents were poor peasants who did not have their own land or even their own house, and were forced to rent small plots of land from the rich, paying for it with backbreaking labor and large taxes. From an early age, after the death of his parents, D. Milev earned his bread with his own labor." Only completing his basic education, at parochial school No 1, Milev held a variety of jobs: he was a laborer in a brick factory, a baker in a shop owned by wealthy Greeks, and a coffee-shop waiter; for a while, he lodged with his uncle in Bolgrad. After moving to Tiraspol, where he lodged on Pokrovsky Lane, he volunteered the 56th Zhytomyr Infantry Regiment. While in the army, he became acquainted with the Russian Social Democrats, sympathized with their cause, and was arrested when he helped in the escape of a comrade by the name of Koltsov.

Released from the army, Milev returned to his native province. He contributed to the newspaper Bessarabskaya Zhizn, and tried to obtain employment as a schoolteacher—but his application was ruled out due to his political unreliability. He then returned under arms from the first days of World War I, during a general mobilization in summer 1914. Milev spent some two years on the Eastern Front, receiving "two wounds and a concussion". His bravery was rewarded by the Russian Empire, which granted him the Order of Saint Vladimir and the right to use a gilded ceremonial weapon. He also obtained an officer's rank, as Shtabs-kapitan; in a 1956 interrogation by the KGB, Milev's activist friend Ion Ocinschi reported that "he never made a secret of this."

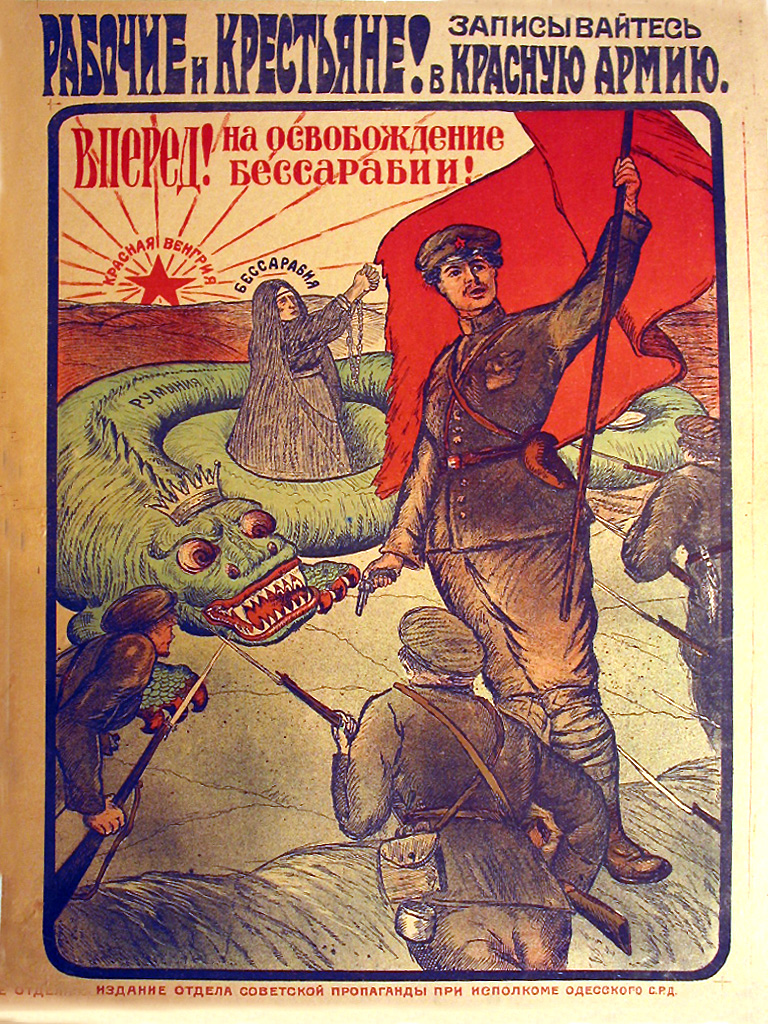
Bolshevik recruitment poster, calling for the "liberation of Bessarabia". Published in Odessa in or around 1919

Milev was brought back into politics by the February Revolution, during which time he took part in "heated debates of the regimental military revolutionary committee". He was again taken out by a wound received during the Kerensky offensive, and had to recover at a military hospital in Kiev. The young veteran was again in Bessarabia "at the very beginning of 1918". Some reconstructions of his biography suggest that he identified with the Bolsheviks during the October Revolution and under the Moldavian Democratic Republic, fleeing Bessarabia during, or shortly after, the Romanian expedition; he therefore opposed the union of Bessarabia with Romania. As Tolochenko puts it: "Milev soon became a witness to the atrocities of the rabid invaders [...]. But Milev did not become a passive and submissive observer of these events, and instead was an active fighter for the liberation and reunification of Bessarabia with the Soviet Union." Tolochenko recounts that Milev had joined the Soviet Communist (Bolshevik) Party and was assigned "various important assignments" (upon his formal induction in 1930, he held party card No. 1664375). Milev was pursued and arrested by the Kingdom of Romania in 1919. He was afterwards indicted in a "Trial of the 108". By his own account, he was "incredibly lucky", only receiving a two-year prison term, when 19 co-defendants had been sentenced to death. According to Tolochenko, Milev then broke out of prison and rejoined the Bolshevik underground. He participated in the Tatarbunary Uprising of 1924, and only fled Bessarabia during the subsequent repression—by crossing the Dniester into Soviet territory.

According to Smochină, Milev's settling in the MASSR gave him privileged status, since, as an outcast from Bessarabia-proper, he could contribute propaganda against Greater Romania. His original debut was as a poet—his verse was taken up in Plugarul Roșu, alongside works by Mihai Andriescu, Teodor Malai, and Pavel Chioru. Milev (who found permanent employment at Plugarul) and Chioru were early adherents of the grammarian Leonid Madan, who had theorized that the "Moldavian language" was entirely unlike Romanian, and who invited writers to fabricate a "Moldavian socialist" lexis. With I. Cușmăunsă, they co-wrote a text which argued that: "We have no need for Romanian literary grammar, since that sort of grammar would completely stifle our Moldavian language" (Ноауы ну ни требуи граматикы литерары ромыниаскы кэч ку ашэ граматикы ной ом ынабушы ди тэт лимба ноастры молдовинясы). In 1926, Milev, already "one of the MASSR's most prominent writers", published Norod moldovenesc ("Moldavian People"), which criticized both Imperial Russia and Greater Romania for having denied Moldavians "the right to be human", keeping them "subjugated and nameless". Historian Charles King suggests that Milev followed propagandist Vladimir Dembo in describing the "emancipatory power of the Bolshevik Revolution" for the Moldavians as a separate people, with full liberation only attainable once Bessarabia had been Sovietized.

=== Lionized author ===
Milev was initially affiliated with the Moldavian Regional Committee of the Ukrainian Communist (Bolshevik) Party (KPU), and assigned by it to the October Revolution Study Section. He and Ocinschi were therefore involved in the project to publish "the classics of Marxism-Leninism" in their "Moldavian" version. A "Milev D.", seen by literary historian Eugen Lungu as "in all likelihood Dumitru Milev" (an identification also backed by writer Iurie Colesnic), penned a translation of Une nuit dans les marais, the short story by Romanian communist Panait Istrati. Done from the Russian version, it was published in 1926 by the Moldavian State Publishing House of Balta, as O noapti'n baltî (Lungu's transliteration). Lungu notes that it may be "the first Romanian language version of that well-known work of prose", though the Moldavian avatar of the language, in both Milev's version and the preface (authored by Vitali Holostenco), was bordering on "gibberish" (păsărească). He adds: "I do not know if Panait Istrati has ever come across this 'Romanian' translation", but also that Istrati's "extreme indignation" with poor-quality renditions of his work into standard Romanian allows one to "imagine what this great unfortunate Istrati would have said, if he had ever managed to read the Balta edition."

Milev made it into the Soviet literary pantheon with Moș Gorițî (Мош Горицэ, "Old Man Gorițî"), originally featured in Plugarul of 1926. It is described by Tolochenko as "the first work of fiction in Moldavian Soviet literature", and also as a record of the Moldavians' "fierce hatred for the [Romanian] occupiers". Despite his moniker, Gorițî, who was allegedly based on a real-life person, appeared as a 30-something veteran of World War I. Upon his return to Cetireni village, he issues a protest against the oppressive Gendarmerie, but is captured, tortured, and finally imprisoned as a "Bolshevik". Milev, alongside authors such as Lehtțir and Chioru, pioneered Marxist literary criticism in the MASSR—with results deemed "quite modest" by literary historian Mihai Cimpoi. In April 1928, Milev founded the literary club Răsăritul ("East"), also serving as editor of the magazines Moldova Literară and Octombrie. In August of that year, Milev and Gavril Buciușcan were members of a welcoming committee which greeted Istrati, who was passing through Balta on his tour of the Soviet Union; in his account of the meeting, Istrati called the MASSR a "Romanian butterfly on the Soviet elephant".

Buciușcan's Russian–Moldavian dictionary, the Slovar, came out in 1929 with Chioru and Milev as editors. The same year, Milev translated from Maxim Gorky, producing Temnița ("The Prison"), which later reviewers have claimed as the first Gorky book to appear in "Moldavian". On June 1, 1929, Răsăritul hosted the first Moldavian writers' congress, which elected Milev as its chairman (replacing Mozes Kahana, who was sent by the Comintern to France), seconded by Lehtțir. As noted by Ocinschi, he was a political figure of importance in the KPU of MASSR, and personally involved in the land collectivization campaign, including as a collector of grain. He continued to write prose: published by Octombrie in 1931, Pi douî maluri ("On Two Banks") was praised by Ocinschi and panned by Smochină. As summarized by scholar Petru Negură, it showed Bessarabia as overwhelmed by the Gendarmerie, in service to the prosperous and exploitative bourgeois class who "would do anything to get rid of the peasants". The piece also alleged that destitute Bessarabians risked punishments for communism, "a word that most of them have not even heard", whenever they dared protest; conversely, it claimed that Bessarabians waved red flags on October Revolution Day, and thus marked their support for the MASSR.

Milev's core contribution to literature was a booklet titled Călătórii ("The Travelers"), or "stories from occupied Bessarabia". Printed in Tiraspol in 1930, it was celebrated by his colleague Lehtțir as "precious for our literature, but also from a historical point of view", in that it "recall[s] those blood-stained days of the Romanian boyars in Bessarabia." Smochină rated the sketches as "below mediocrity", though noting that humorous fragments, such as Stănescu and Eu gioc în cărți ("I Play Them Cards"), show more stylistic vigor in their depiction of petty corruption. Tolochenko disliked the latter piece for its treatment of the positive hero, the Polish student Vasile; he notes that, overall, Milev was "weaker" in his portrayals of innocent bystanders and Bolshevik heroes. Overall, he found that the author's merit was political, since Milev "correctly understood the life and political situation, took up the proper positions within the party, and, to the best of his ability, depicted one of the milestone periods in the history of the Moldavian people." In addition to including a reprint of Moș Gorițî, Călătórii states similar claims about Romanian abuse against native Bessarabians, spread out across several other stories; the title piece, Călătórii, shows Romanian students (branded as "fascists") arriving in Ungheni to disrupt the local Jewish community.

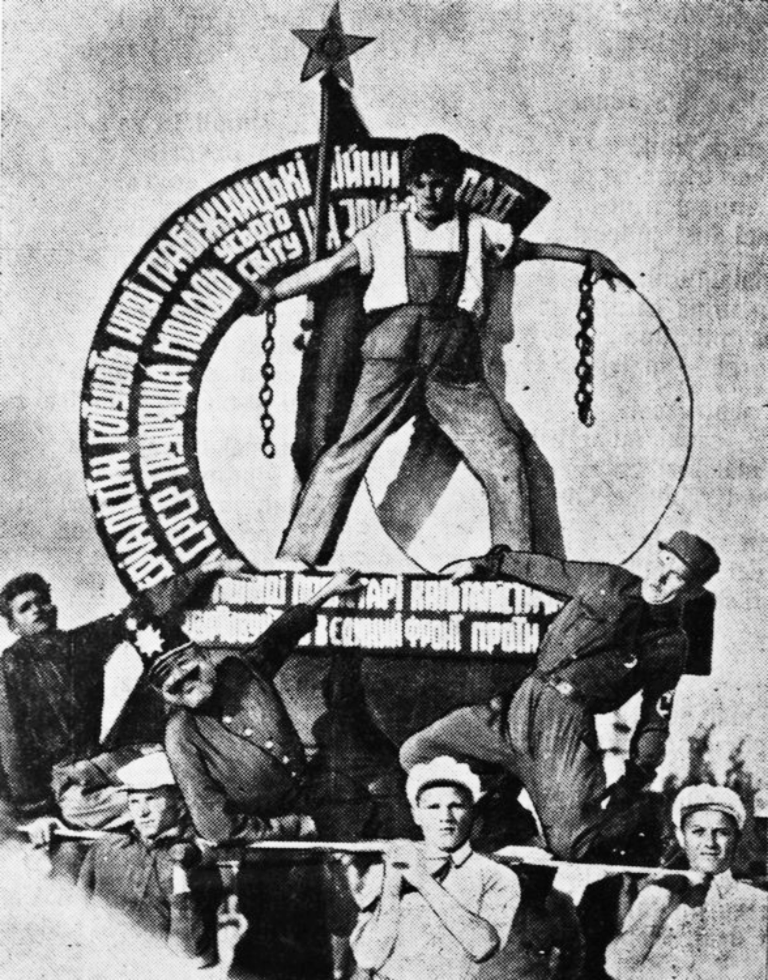
Ziua internațională a tineretului — MIUD XXI în or. Tiraspol ("The International Day of Youth — MYUD XXI in the city of Tiraspol"), as published in the September 1935 issue of Octombrie

In early 1932, Milev and Ocinschi tried to oppose Soviet Latinization, which briefly adopted the Romanian alphabet as a national standard for "Moldavian". Writing in early 1936, Smochină suggested that: "Intellectually, Milev is exactly at that same cultural level he had back when he left Bessarabia. Favored by circumstances, he did not know how to make use of them and cultivate himself; hence, his star shall fade out as a new generation takes over." The scholar sees Milev's writing after Latinization as fully incomprehensible to his target audience of workers, superficial, and entirely devoid of narrative logic. Milev's one play, Două lumi ("Two Worlds") was performed at the Tiraspol State Theater in late 1933. According to Smochină, it was the inaugural production of that new institution, though Colesnic provides evidence that the distinction actually goes to Lehtțir's Biruința. Overall, Două lumi builds on the vision of Bessarabia as abandoned to the Romanian persecutors; according to Smochină, it is "unaccomplished"—not least of all because of its "incomprehensible language", almost entirely modeled on the Madan standards. The text had the particularity of being partly rooted in "contemporary life", whereas most of Milev's stories had been entirely about his Romanian past.

=== Purge victim ===
The early 1930s witnessed Milev's participation in the Latin-based literacy campaign. In 1933, he and D. Grigorieva co-authored a primer for adult education (Abecedar: Pentru școala de vîrstnici), which placed emphasis on the terms-of-art in industrial life, as well as on the ideological tropes of Marxism-Leninism. From mid-1935, as acting chairman of the Moldavian Union of Writers, Milev was sending reports to the Agitprop directorate about its ineffectiveness in areas around Rîbnița. He and Lehtțir were MASSR envoys to the First All-Union Congress of Soviet Writers in August–September 1934, though only as members of Soviet Ukraine's larger delegation. As recounted in 1990 by Milev's son Vladimir (born in 1936), it was there that Dmitrii engaged with Karl Radek, a respected figure Old Bolsheviks, and "fell in love with this man, was captivated by his Bolshevik passion, conviction, unshakable faith in revolutionary ideals."

By then, the issue of differentiating between Romanian and Moldavian had become a large-scale political controversy; Soviet theater historian Pyotr Yershov suggests that "the higher Party organizations' insistence on a sharp distinction between Rumanian and Moldavian" clashed with a "natural desire of some Moldavian writers and philologists to use as a base for the formulation of a Moldavian literary language the already crystallized Rumanian, which is in fact extremely close to Moldavian". Overall, he notes: "Moldavian creative writing was an accomplished, if embryonic, art by the beginning of the twentieth century. Moldavian material that could be used in [declamation] classes included prose works by D. Milev". As noted by historian Alexandru Molcosean, Milev was ostensibly marginalized in 1935, when he was first accused of Romanian nationalism, and had his name removed from the standard primer. Grigorieva and P. Crăciun were now credited as the authors, though there was virtually no change in content. He retained his convictions, as shown by one of his written articles of July 1936: "I am glad that I inhabit this happy country, a proletarian country, where the workers and peasants, under the leadership of the Communist Party, are engaged in building socialism for themselves. I feel even happier that I, too, am helping in this construction with my writing pen."

His son suggests that Dmitrii was in fact greatly troubled by news of the Great Purge, especially since it had destroyed his revolutionary idols—including Radek and Iona Yakir, themselves branded as "wreckers". The purges came to the MASSR in May 1937, combining a clampdown of real or suspected "Trotskyites" with a round-up of alleged spies and nationalists. In the initial, non-violent phase, Milev watched as the local party leader, Grigore Starîi, was deposed over his reported connections with Bruno Jasieński and Vladimir Kirshon. He understood this to be a "prelude" to the full-on attack on Moldavian suspects, including himself and his close friend, Nikolay Golub. In July 1937, Moldova Socialistă paper hosted a piece by A. Chiricenko, in which Două lumi was called "harmful". Milev was accused of having "grossly falsifie[d]" history, in particular by not showing the activity of economic wreckers. The newspaper also commented on the bound edition of Pi douî maluri, whose cover had shown the Dniester's left bank colored in red—interpreting this as a malevolent, politicized clue. Possibly by error, Moldova Socialistă still hosted a large fragment from Stănescu. Milev received no congratulatory calls after this apparent success: "the phone was silent. But who could call if most of his comrades were already in captivity? It seemed that the circle was shrinking."

Though allowed to carry on with his editorial work at Octombrie, Milev was stripped of his party membership on September 5, 1937. During his final months of freedom, he "worked impulsively" as a journalist, while also translating from Gorky and Alexander Serafimovich; alongside Starîi and Mihail Baluh, he produced "Moldavian" versions of the new Soviet and Ukrainian Constitutions. His activity was only interrupted by the NKVD officer Gorbunov, who came to arrest him at an unspecified date in late 1937 (unusually, he was picked up during morning, whereas most other raids were done at night). One of the charges brought up against him was that he had established a "counterrevolutionary Moldavian nationalist organization" as early as 1927, into which he had then co-opted other figures of the MASSR's cultural establishment. His translations of constitutional documents were cited as additional proof, with an allegation being made that he had engaged in their "deliberate distortion".

Milev was interrogated in Tiraspol prison by Lieutenant Burlaka. He denied the charges, though Burlaka warned him to reconsider: "Think about it, you will have plenty of time". He ultimately caved when an expert interrogator, Sergent Gureyev, was called in to help Burlaka. Researcher B. Belenchi suggests that, from that moment on, Milev had been brutalized, and made to sign a confession that was suspiciously ungrammatical. This paper included fabricated details on Milev's having been recruited by a Romanian spy ring in Rozdilna. He also admitted to have consciously worked on the MASSR's "Romanianization" and toward "stunt[ing] the growth of Soviet Moldovan culture". Though Milev denied or retracted all such statements during the final interrogation (adding: "I have never carried out counter-revolutionary nationalist work"), he was still declared guilty of crimes defined by Articles 54-10, 54-11 and 54-6 of the Criminal Code of the Ukrainian SSR, and as such had no right of appeal. The writer was finally executed by shooting at Tiraspol, on October 13, 1937. This was part of a wave of similar death sentences, with victims that mostly included intellectuals who had either promoted, or had come to accept, the Romanian literary standard. Almost exactly one year later, Malai was sentenced to be shot as Milev's collaborator in crimes of sabotage, alleged to have begun in 1937. Literary scholar Nina Scutaru notes that both Milev and Buciușcan, who had greeted Istrati in 1928, were eventually killed by the NKVD as "Romanian spies".

== Legacy ==
Milev was survived by Vladimir, his only offspring from a legal marriage to an unnamed woman. During World War II, a Soviet occupation of Bessarabia inaugurated the Moldavian Soviet Socialist Republic, fusing that region with much of the former MASSR. Soviet historiography now viewed Milev's killing, as well as those of other MASSR writers, as embarrassing, and records were falsified to show that he had died, at an unspecified location, on October 3, 1944. A reopening of the Milev dossier occurred in August 1956, during the age of de-Stalinization—as the KGB investigator, Boris Karpunin was ordered to follow up on a petition registered by three poets (Leonid Corneanu, Lev Barschi and Yakov Kutkovetsky), stating the case for his rehabilitation. The resulting file included interviews with Ocinschi, who recalled that Latinization had been initially cherished and imposed by Joseph Stalin and Stanisław Kosior, before being imposed on Moldavian intellectuals—though he also added that Milev himself had genuinely preferred the Latin script, since it could "enrich the language". Overall, Ocinschi expressed his appreciation for the "very conscious" Milev, whose literary work had produced "healthy socialist content." Karpunin himself noted that the nationalist organization described in the 1937 dossier had never even existed, and that the authorities of Communist Romania could not locate any mention of Milev having been on the Siguranța payroll. The investigator additionally spoke of "illegal investigative methods" used against Milev and other victims of the period, thereby acknowledging that the interrogations had involved torture.

Rehabilitation was formalized on June 1, 1957, when the Supreme Court of the Soviet Union cancelled Milev's initial sentencing and terminated his case "due to the absence of a crime" (as Belenchi observes, this verdict was inaccurately formulated, since Milev had never had a legal trial). In the aftermath, Karpunin was unable to locate any of Milev's books, since, during the Purge, all copies had been apparently removed from MASSR libraries. Some were however retrieved from a "book chamber" in Kharkov, and again made available to the community of writers. Milev's new status, which saw his work included in primers and textbooks, allowed dissenting Moldavian authors, who had remarked that Latinization was no longer criminalized, to push for the full recognition of Romanian literature as part of the regional canon. Already during Karpunin's investigation, expert witnesses such as Samuil Bernstein and Ruben Bugdanov informed that there was no actual difference between Romanian and Moldavian, and that theories to the contrary "did great harm to Soviet linguistics." A 1958 issue of Literaturnaya Gazeta featured critic Vasile Coroban's musings about the growth of Moldavian literature, listing Milev as a founding figure. His works were collected for print that same year. Tolochenko's overview, published in 1959, claimed that Milev had died of "a serious heart disease" on October 13, 1944 (while working on a novel), and concluded: "The literary heritage of D. Milev is small in volume, but it is a clear testimony to how the Soviet government creates the broadest opportunities for the development of talents among the people."

Into the 1970s, Coroban continued to describe Milev and Ion Canna as the "sources of all Moldavian Soviet prose", but, as noted in 2019 by critic Cristina Antoni, his assessment failed to make the authors regain popularity: "The writers' total grounding in ideological themes [...], along with their schematism, their lack of imagination, their linguistic inability, drastically reduced any interest that readers of the sixties and seventies could have maintained for such narratives." In May 1971, Ivan Bodiul, who chaired the Communist Party of Moldavia, spoke about the need to conserve Moldavian literature as a venue for Soviet patriotism and communist partisanship. In his overview, Bodiul assessed that the aesthetic model should be based on works produced "when Soviet power was being established." Philologist Michael Bruchis argues that this effectively reduced the literary canon to "completely uninspired literary attempts" by authors such as Milev and Canna—any earlier Bessarabian author was in fact supportive of Romanian nationalism. At an unknown date, Ada Zevin was commissioned to paint Milev's portrait, which is kept at the Chișinău Museum of Literature. The actual circumstances of his death were first explored during the Perestroika years, beginning with a biographical article by N. Moraru for a 1989 issue of Nistru magazine. The following year, Belenchi retrieved Milev's dossier and published excepts from it. In post-Soviet Moldova, he was formally commemorated, including by having his name inscribed on a votive cross in Chișinău, alongside Chioru, Lehtțir, Malai, and 29 other writers described as "massacred or deported by the diabolical communist-Stalinist regime."
