= Baurci (disambiguation) =

Baurci may refer to several places in Moldova:

- Baurci, a commune in Gagauzia
- Baurci, a village in Chircăieștii Noi Commune, Căușeni District
- Baurci-Moldoveni, a commune in Cahul District
- Tatar-Baurci, the former name for Tătărești Commune, Căușeni District
