= Moldoveni =

Moldoveni may refer to several places in Romania:

- Moldoveni, Ialomița, a commune in Ialomița County
- Moldoveni, Neamț, a commune in Neamț County
- Moldoveni, a village in Islaz Commune, Teleorman County

and to:

- Baurci-Moldoveni, a commune in Cahul District, Moldova

== See also ==
- Moldoveni, the Romanian word for Moldovans
