= Samuil Lehtțir =

Moldovan poet, critic and literary theorist

Samuil Rivinovici Lehtțir
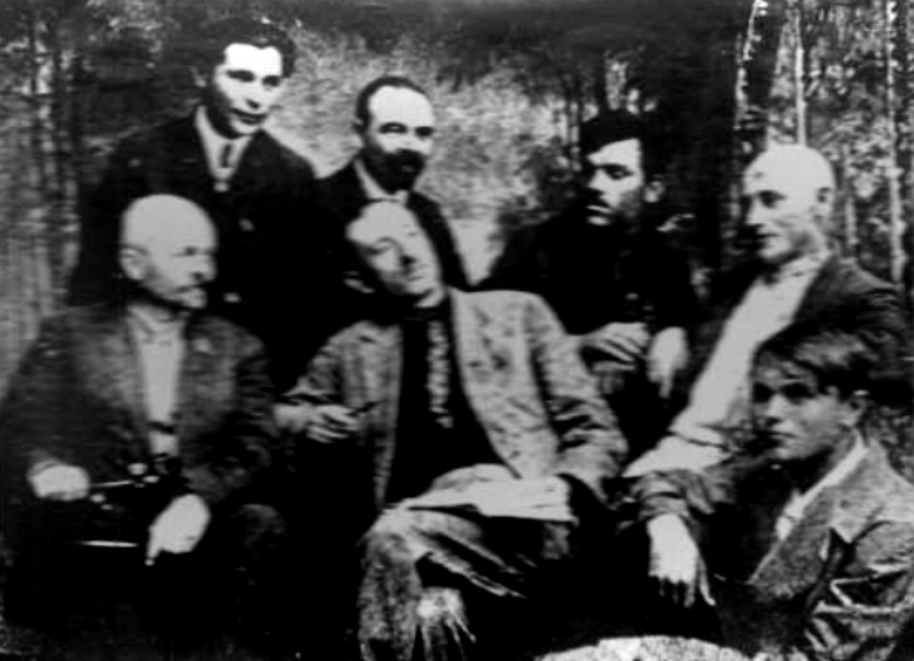
- Lehtțir (top left) with fellow writers, including Mihai Andriescu, Dmitrii Milev, and Pavel Chioru. Photograph originally published in Întrebări literari
- Born: October 25, 1901; Otaci, Bessarabia Governorate, Russian Empire
- Died: October 15, 1937 (aged 35); Tiraspol, Moldavian Autonomous Soviet Socialist Republic, Soviet Union
- Occupations: Journalist, publisher, librarian, literary critic, literary theorist, poet, playwright
- Writing career
- Period: ca. 1927–1937
- Genres: Essay, lyric poetry, epic poetry, political poetry, historical drama, political drama
- Literary movement: Proletkult, Proletarian literature, Marxist literary criticism

Samuil Rivinovici Lehtțir, also rendered as Lehțir, Lehtțâr, Lekhttsir, Lekhtser, and Lehitser (Russian: Самуил Ривинович Лехтцир or Лехтцер; October 25, 1901 – October 15, 1937), was a Moldovan poet, critic, and literary theorist. Of Bessarabian Jewish origin, he rejected Romanian nationalism as a youth, and fled to the Ukrainian Soviet Socialist Republic. Returning to complete his studies at Cernăuți University in the Kingdom of Romania, he was regarded as a political suspect, and again escaped to the Moldavian Autonomous Soviet Socialist Republic (MASSR) in 1926—soon after that polity had been created within the Soviet Union. He was employed as a book publisher and journalist, emerging as an authority on literary matters. Lehtțir adopted Proletkult ideas about the need to destroy and rebuild cultural traditions; on such grounds, he and his colleague Iosif Vainberg came to deny that there was a Bessarabian literature that was worth preserving, and that Moldavian literary tradition could be built up from proletarian identity and Soviet patriotism. This sparked a special controversy within a larger debate about Romanian and Moldavian identity.

Lehtțir's ideas were disregarded by the Communist Party of the Soviet Union, which, in 1932, ordered writers to search for inspiration in their local traditions. As a result, Lehtțir revised his theory, and began hosting selective samples of older Romanian literature in Octombrie magazine. He became a founding figure of Moldavian theater, first with a historical play that was never performed in his lifetime, and later with a political play, Biruința. By that point, Lehtțir had also publicly welcomed the Latinization of Soviet alphabets, which had reduced to a minimum the differences between the Romanian and Moldavian literary standards. This position made the Stalinist regime take notice of Lehtțir, and contributed to his downfall and execution by the NKVD. Shortly before his death, he had been tortured into confessing that he was a Romanian spy. He was largely rehabilitated, alongside other Great Purge victims, by the early 1960s, but the details of his biography were purposefully hidden from the reading public by continued Soviet censorship.

== Biography ==
=== Early life ===
Lehtțir belonged to the Bessarabian Jewish community. He was born on October 25, 1901, at Otaci, in the Russian Empire's Bessarabia Governorate (Soroksky Uyezd). His father was known in Yiddish as "Ruvin-Chaim", a variant of the Hebrew "Reuben-Chaim"; the surname "Lehtțir" is of likely German origin, from lecht ("light") and zier ("ornament"). The poet's mother, Dina Aizikovna Akerman, was originally from Briceni. Lehtțir's native region proclaimed itself the Moldavian Democratic Republic in late 1917, shortly after the October Revolution in Russia; this polity was included in Romania by the end of 1918. The seventeen-year-old was an opponent of the union, and, as literary historians Nichita Smochină and Iurie Colesnic both indicate, actively fought against the Romanian military intervention.

After fleeing Greater Romania, Lehtțir completed his secondary education at Mohyliv-Podilskyi, in what was already Soviet Ukraine. Shortly after, he was found to have returned to Romania, and to have enrolled at Cernăuți University. His presence in the country was followed by the Siguranța police force, which had the young man listed as a sympathizer of the Soviet Union; Smochină reports that Lehtțir, who never graduated, was sentenced to a five-year jail term "for communist propaganda", but also that he evaded capture. In 1926, he illegally crossed the Dniester into the newly formed MASSR, moving for a second and final time into Soviet territory. The republican government welcomed him, assigning him to the Moldavian Scientific Center (formed as a local branch of the Soviet Academy), and employing him as a branch director of the State Publishing House in Tiraspol. He married a Soviet Jewish woman, Yevgenia Solomonovna Khosh. In 1927, they had a son, Myud.

On April 1, 1928, Lehtțir co-founded Răsăritul ("The East", or "The Sunrise"), an association of Soviet Moldavian writers. In July 1929, he became its secretary, serving directly under Dmitrii Milev; also that year, he published at Balta his first selection of verse, as Poezii ("Poems"), seen by theatrical historian Pyotr Yershov as a work of genuine literary value. The collection included a river-themed nocturne:

Tăceri, noaptea, Nistru curge,
Apili șoptesc, șoptesc...
Parcă Nestru cîntî o doinî...
Parcă'i grai moldovinesc.
Șî pădurea parcî doarmi...
Sus pi șeri plutești luna,
Iar copacii di diparti
Sî închin cu 'noaptea bunî'

Translation:

Silent, at night, the Dniester flows,
Its waters whisper, whisper away...
As if the Dniester is singing a doina...
In the sweet Moldovan language.
And the forest seems asleep...
The moon floats high above the hills,
And the trees of the countryside
Bid 'good night'

Lehtțir contributed translations of works by Aleksandr Bezymensky, Mikhail Lermontov, Alexander Pushkin, and Sergei Yesenin; perhaps fluent in Hungarian, he published some translations from Sándor Petőfi. As he acknowledged in later essays, his literary youth was shaped by echoes from Yesenin, though he later came to regret them, calling Yesenin a "peasant" whose influence should have been carefully expunged from proletarian literature. Lehtțir's early contributions to literary criticism include articles in Plugarul Roșu newspaper. One such piece, appearing in November 1928, offered some praise to the cultural tradition of Bessarabia, described as distul di bogatî ("pretty extensive") and as worthy of imitation. At that stage, he was taking a direct interest in popularizing Romanian literature for a Soviet audience, especially through the magazine Moldova Literarî (of which he was the editor). It was here that he covered the works of Panait Istrati in 1929 (shortly after Istrati's visit to the MASSR); it was also here that, in December 1929, he condemned aspiring poets who plagiarized Romanian folklore as a means of getting ahead in literary life—Lehtțir wrongly identified Doina, a poem written by Vasile Alecsandri, as a folkloric sample.

At that stage of his career, Lehtțir was endorsing the project to create a separate "Moldovan" or "Moldavian" language, part of which relied on establishing the Moldavian accent as standard pronunciation. He criticized translators working in the MASSR for using the "tough Romanian–Moldavian language, which Moldavian early readers have a hard time comprehending." He soon became interested in creating political neologisms. The latter imitated Russian lexemes (bronzîinic, "of the Bronze Age", fărăclasnic, "classless", mîncătorie, "canteen" etc.), and, as argued by historian Maria Vieru-Ișaev, "belong to the annals of absurdity". By 1930, the orders he received from the Scientific Center staff were issued in the same form: Di poruncit tov. Lehtțir grabnic sî muti jurnalurili în păstralițî, slobozind loc în bibliotecî pentru monografii ("Ordering Comrade Lehtțir to quickly move the newspapers into the storage room, with the library thus cleared for the monographs").

=== Latinization turn ===
The neologistic current, formed around Leonid Madan, was eventually curbed by the Soviet authorities, resulting in a selective purge at the Scientific Center. As reported by Smochină, the post-backlash Center was entirely controlled by Lehtțir and Naum Nartsov, both of whom were Jewish; Nartsov's contribution was symbolic, since he was a "tinsmith and cobbler by trade". Historian Wim van Meurs notes that "Lekhttsir collected an enormous amount of source material on the history of the [Dniester's] left bank." Smochină similarly commended Lehtțir for his collecting an "immense volume of documents", but noted that he kept all "in the messiest way possible, in one unlocked room, so that anyone can lose or steal them". Moreover, he claimed that Lehtțir had kept for himself "almost all Romanian books in the library of that section he runs."

In 1930, along with Iosif Vainberg, Lehtțir issued a book of essays, titled Întrebări literari ("Literary Questions"), which revised some of his earlier positions. Scholar Silvia Grossu reviews this as a sample of Proletkult ideology, in that it denied any merit to local literary tradition—promoting a Moldovan (Moldavian) identity that relied entirely on Sovietization, and on these grounds was proclaimed as separate from the Romanian ethnos (see Moldovenism). The tract is remembered for Lehtțir's own chapter, Literatura moldoveneascî'n Basarabia ("Moldavian Literature in Bessarabia"), which, according to social historian Petru Negură, was written in an ironic key. In it, Lehtțir expressed the opinion that Bessarabia was lost for a workers' literature—to which Vainberg added his claim that Soviet Moldavians, though of more meager talents, could constitute a bulwark against the "bourgeois" themes of Romanian literature. The authors polemically argued:

Dacă alte literaturi au lăsat vreo moștenire literară, care poate măcar puțin să fie folosită după revoluție, literatura moldovenească așa moștenire nu a avut. Și dacă noi om pune întrebarea ce putem lua din literatura noastră de ieri, apoi om primi un singur răspuns — nică.	If other literatures have left us any sort of literary inheritance, of the kind that may be of some use after the revolution [of October 1917], Moldavian literature has had no such thing. And if we may address the question: what could we select from our literature of yesterday?, well, there is only one answer to give — nought.

According to literary historian Mihai Cimpoi, Întrebări literari, along with similar contributions by Milev and Pavel Chioru, evidences the poor state of literary culture in the MASSR: "[they are] quite modest, and slavish [...] toward the official ideology. [...] The dogmatic, vulgarized sociological spirit, with its purpose of detecting class enemies among the writers, as instructed by the Russian Association of Proletarian Writers, is dominant in that era, crushing nuances and all creative aspect of criticism." Negură notes that Întrebări literari was immediately superseded by two events, both of which took place in 1932: one was the castigation of Proletkult's legacy by the Soviet Central Committee; the other was the regime's talk of a "Moldavian language" that now "differed only in its name from the Romanian literary language". The change of vision was also underscored with the Latinization of Soviet alphabets. As Smochină reports: "If the Soviets have accepted a national culture, it was over communist fundamentals. Yet it seemed like things were clearing up. [...] The name of Latinization allowed the people its freedom to adapt its national culture to the fundamentals of communist doctrine."

These developments sent MASSR writers to study old forms of Romanian literature, with samples of 19th-century Romanian authors appearing in the official literary magazine, Octombrie ("October"). Lehtțir himself became affiliated with that magazine, serving as its managerial secretary. It was also here that he made his name as a poet—the MASSR's most significant and "livelier" one, according to Smochină. His lyrical works therein include a 1931 piece, also called Octombrie, which, Negură argues, was a celebration of Soviet patriotism. The Soviet Union "appears as a country of gigantic proportions, animated by a universal effervescence and enthusiasm."

Lehtțir's poetry is described by Colesnic as "politically engaged" and mostly "minor", with the exception of one Octombrie poem which anticipated the first crewed space flight by over 25 years. The latter piece "amazes in its selection of a theme and the precision of its poetic description". As noted by Smochină, his political poetry often expands on his grievances against Romania, with Bessarabia depicted as an enslaved giant; stylistically, these pieces follow Mihai Eminescu, Alecsandri and Yesenin, to the point where they plagiarize from the latter. It generally failed to meet up Soviet demands, since it retained such "bourgeois" influences. In late 1931, the staff at Octombrie embarked on a "defamation campaign" against Lehtțir, as well as against his colleagues Mihai Andriescu and Leonid Cornfeld, forcing them to publish self-criticism in a special issue of 1932. Their reintegration by the revamped communist-and-Latinist establishment was marked later that year, when the three of them, alongside Ion Ocinschi, curated a Latin-script translation of The Communist Manifesto. Also in 1932, Lehtțir alone was "art editor" for B. I. Borisov's propaganda book on the Tatarbunary Uprising—which was published in a language nearly identical to modern Romanian, and could therefore be understood by readers on the other bank of the Dniester.

=== Further "deviations" and downfall ===
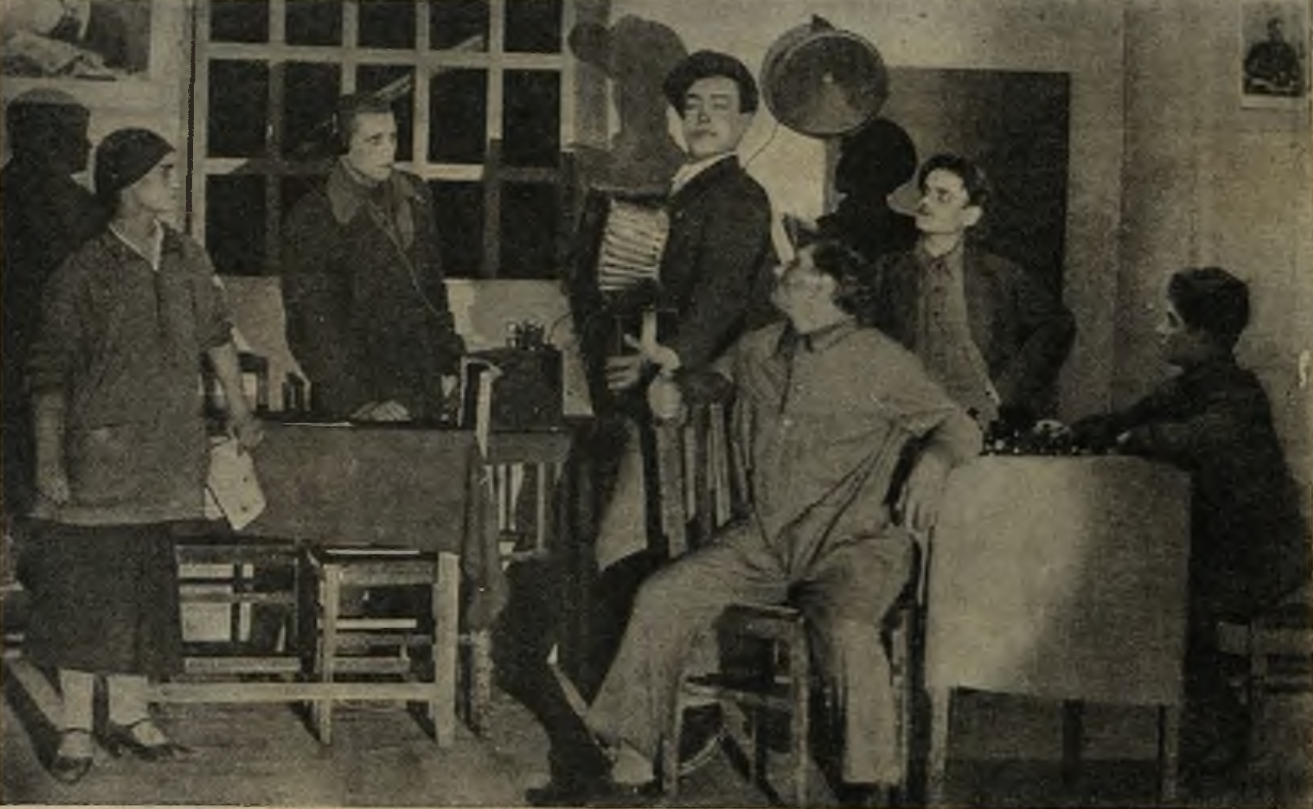
Scene from Biruința in its original staging by the Tiraspol State Theater, 1933

Most of Lehtțir's poetic works appeared as a quick succession of volumes. Poezîi ("Poems") of 1929 was followed by În flăcări ("In Flames", 1931), Sirenele zidirii ("Sirens of Construction", 1932), De pază ("On Guard", 1935) and Dezrobire ("Emancipation", also 1935). He was additionally the author of the first dramas of Soviet Moldavian literature: Codreanu (1930) and Biruința ("Victory", 1933). In the former, Lehtțir explored the story of haiduci and other themes in the history of "feudal Moldavia"—this is probably why the work was never shown in MASSR theaters, which still followed proletarian commands. Biruința, which Smochină sees as closely modeled on Alecsandri's plays, is largely about "the shock worker movement and the most recent socialist labor methods". It was the inaugural production of the Tiraspol State Theater, on November 7, 1933. This staging was welcomed by Lehtțir himself with an article which voiced his thoughts on language policy, describing "Moldavian language" as unifying the masses of Bessarabia with those of the MASSR, especially after Latinization.

As noted by Yershov, Codreanu was an "excellent" play, but was "considered by the Soviets to suffer from 'deviations'." Fragments from it and from Biruința, as well as from another play known as Gauduka ("about the revolutionary insurrectionist movement among the peasant serfs"), were still used in acting lessons. The author himself acknowledged that theater needed to take inspiration from life, and that the few plays written "lagged behind" in that regard; Biruința is seen by Colesnic as "poorly written, in accordance with the standards of that day, when thematic focus fell on the conflicts of [industrial] production." From 1934, Lehtțir was a ruling-council member of the MASSR Writers' Union. He and Milev were Moldavian envoys to the First All-Union Congress of Soviet Writers in August–September of that year, but subsumed to the larger delegation of Soviet Ukraine.

Lehtțir's published contributions came to include 12 volumes, three of which were textbooks for elementary schools. The latter works evidenced his full break with Proletkult, by including samples of the Romanian classics—Alecsandri, Eminescu, and George Coșbuc. Such influences appear in De pază, which eulogizes Soviet Border Troops using metaphors which, as historian Marius Tărîță observes, were directly lifted from Eminescu and Grigore Alexandrescu. Also published in 1935, the epic poem Ostașul roșu ("The Red Soldier") similarly celebrated Soviet defense capabilities; its characteristic note was in comparing young recruits with the bogaturs of Russian folklore. Smochină also mentions a "series of poems", Lupta de clasă în Basarabia ("The Class Struggle in Bessarabia"), which appeared in late 1935.

Lehtțir's ultimate downfall, which arrived over the following months, was due to his having championed Latinization, now branded a sample of Romanian nationalism. Tărîță connects his demise to that of Milev, who was the first one to be sidelined, then arrested, after reports that he had been neglectful of "counter-revolutionary activity [by] foreign spies". Journalist David Khakham argues that a fellow Jewish dramatist, whom he identifies only with the initials "L. B." and the detail of his survival into the 1970s, acted as an informer on Lehtțir's own activities. The poet was ultimately arrested in 1937. According to Colesnic's research, the NKVD then tortured him into confessing that his crossing of the Dniester was as a Romanian spy, and that his support for the Latin alphabet was a deliberate attempt to undermine the Soviet Union.

According to family tradition, Lehtțir was executed on May 12, 1937, which was shortly after Yevgenia's arrest and deportation to the Gulag; also then, Myud was taken from the couple and assigned to a state orphanage. In July, the issue of "sabotage" by Lehtțir and Cornfeld was brought up in sessions of the Communist Party of Ukraine, Tiraspol Regional Committee. A "Comrade Brihman" reported at the time that the introduction of "Romanian authors" in MASSR textbooks, weighed against an "insignificant number of Russian and Ukrainian classics", had been highly detrimental for the education process. Brihman announced that he was devoting himself to the task of removing all such texts. Records consulted by Colesnic indicate that Lehtțir was in fact sentenced to death by shooting on October 10 of that year; the sentence was carried out on October 15. This was four days after Chioru's execution, and two days after Milev's.

== Legacy ==
By 1938, the Tiraspol company was only allowed to produce plays by Russian or Ukrainian authors. Following a Soviet occupation in June 1940, the MASSR and Bessarabia were fused into the Moldavian Soviet Socialist Republic. The Romanian retaliation came in 1941, when, as part of Operation Barbarossa, Bessarabia and lands further east were reoccupied by Romania—with Tiraspol included in the Transnistria Governorate. Writing shortly after this, in August 1941, Romanian scholar Sergiu Grossu referred to Lehtțir, Milev, Cornfeld and Culai Neniu as "dubious" non-Romanians pushed into the MASSR's literary culture by "Judeo-communist ideas". He contrasted them with more recoverable individuals, namely MASSR Romanians such as Nistor Cabac and Filimon Săteanu. As noted by Khakham, Cornfeld unusually survived the purges and World War II, despite being liable for the same accusations levied against Lehtțir.

The restoration of the Moldavian SSR in 1944 did not engender a reconsideration of Lehtțir's contribution. Philologist Ion Șpac recalls that, during his time as a student at Chișinău University in the mid 1950s, Soviet censorship had made it impossible to even mention "the great Samuil Lehtțir". He also notes that his professor, Vasile Coroban, was free to talk about this topic only after 1962. Lehtțir was "fully rehabilitated" after De-Stalinization in 1956; in 1967, Yevgenia, who had returned from the camps some 20 years before, launched a public appeal for her late husband's recovery, including clarification regarding the circumstances of his death. By then, the themes of Codreanu had been reused in one of the first Moldova-Film productions, Ataman Codr (1958). The deaths of Lehtțir and his "nationalist" generation colleagues were a lingering embarrassment for the regime, into the 1980s. As noted by Colesnic, Soviet historiography falsified his biographical data, to make it seem like he had died on October 15, 1943, something which his family had always doubted. The same deliberate misdating is noted by critic Ion Ciocanu, as a "rather subtle plague of the totalitarian regime. [...] Its purpose is for the reader to imagine that [Lehtțir and other authors] have died in the war, rather than understand that they were victims of Stalinist terror."

No existing record clarifies what happened to Myud Lehtțir after his state kidnapping in 1937; his mother Yevgenia moved to Israel with her second husband, and died there in 1982. Their daughter, Rimma Khavkin, has contributed to the effort of restoring Samuil Lehtțir's memory, noting in 2019 that people "know very little about him today (or rather, they don't know anything!), that there are no photographs of him anywhere, there are no books written by him and about him." As reported by Khakham, who assisted Khavkin in her efforts, the one Moldovan author to take an interest in covering Lehtțir's work had been Sara Șpitalnic, with her 2000 work of biography, Евреи Молдовы ("Jews of Moldova"). Also according to Khakham, Codreanu exists in a single copy, preserved by the National Library of Moldova. That institution also preserves Lehtțir's signed copy of Dimitrie Cantemir's Descriptio Moldaviae, in the German edition of 1771; its first known owner was Ivan Liprandi. In July 2022, Lehtțir had his name inscribed on a votive cross in Chișinău, alongside Cabac, Chioru, Milev, Săteanu, and 28 other writers described as "massacred or deported by the diabolical communist-Stalinist regime."
