= Bolhrad High School =

Georgi Sava Rakovski Bolhrad High School
- Болградська гімназія імені Г.С. Раковського
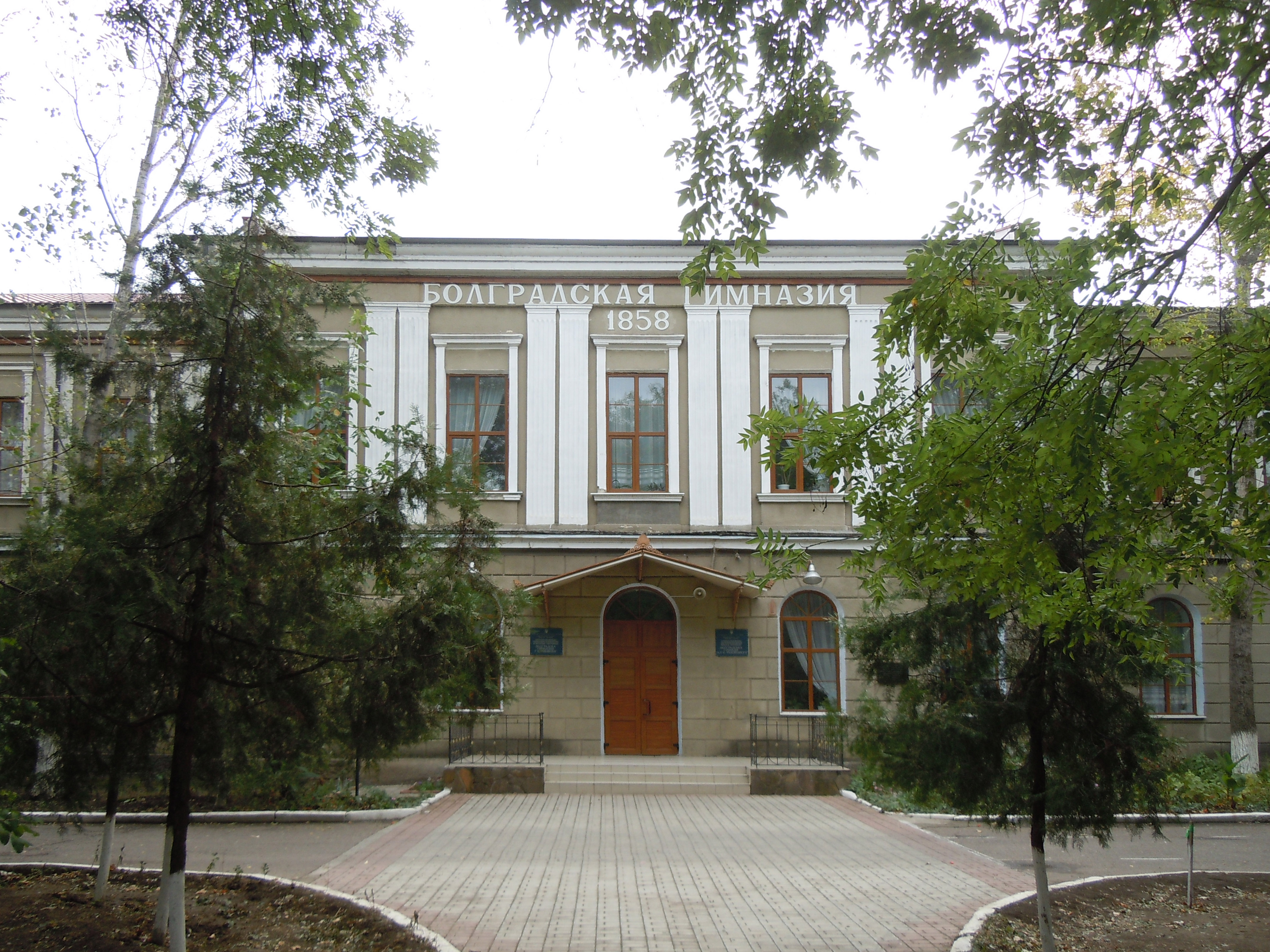
- Main building

Location
- Vulytsya Vchylyshchna; Bolhrad, Odesa Oblast; Ukraine
- 45.6756°N 28.6157°E

Information
- Other name: Болградска гимназия „Георги Сава Раковски“
- Former names: Bulgarian School (1858–1876); Romanian Lyceum (1876–1879); Bolgrad Eight-year Gymnasium (1879–1884); Alexander III Gymnasium (1884–1918); Bolgrad Boys' Lyceum (1918–1932, 1941–1944); Carol II Boys' Lyceum (1932–1940); Bolgrad/Bolhrad Gymnasium (1940–1999)
- Type: Public school
- Founded: 10 June 1858; 168 years ago
- Head of school: Snezhana Skorich (2023)
- Grades: 1–12
- Age range: 6–18
- Enrolment: 523 (2023)

The Georgi Sava Rakovski Bolhrad High School (Ukrainian: Болградська гімназія імені Г.С. Раковського, Bolhrads'ka himnaziya im. H.S. Rakovs'koho; Bulgarian: Болградска гимназия „Георги Сава Раковски“, Bolgradska gimnazia „Georgi Sava Rakovski“) is a public school in Bolhrad, Odesa Oblast, southwestern Ukraine; though formally designated a gymnasium (high school), it currently provides classes for students aged 6 to 18. It was established on 10 June 1858, in what was then the Principality of Moldavia, at the request of Bessarabian Bulgarian and Gagauz communities, and was thus the oldest high school of the Bulgarian National Revival; to this day, it remains central to the expression of Bulgarian culture in Ukraine. Originally, it was self-sustaining and had a supervisory sole over various primary schools in southern Bessarabia, with funds provided by its ownership of several lakes and fisheries just north of the Danube Delta—including Yalpuh and Kuhurlui. Its current name, granted in 1999, honors a Bulgarian intellectual leader and political activist, Georgi Sava Rakovski, who was personally involved in the gymnasium's establishment.

The school, along with all of southern Bessarabia, was integrated with the Principality of Romania from 1859 to 1878, and was exposed to Romanianization attempts; its regional monopoly on Bulgarian education was also questioned by the Russian Empire, which provided for rival institutions in Comrat and Mykolaiv. The institution preserved its core mission and its autonomy into the 1870s, when its students actively fought during the Liberation of Bulgaria. Immediately after, Bolhrad itself was annexed by Russia, and folded into the Bessarabia Governorate. The regime of Tsarist autocracy closed down its printing press, phased out its ethnic privileges, and, in 1884, renamed it after Alexander III. The gymnasium was not stripped of its estates, which it preserved into the interwar period, when Bessarabia was united with Romania. The Greater Romanian regimes tried but failed to confiscate the lakes; they also resumed centralizing policies, and insisted for the admittance of non-Bulgarian students—though the school continued to be staffed by ethnic-minority professors, they had their political loyalties subjected to public scrutiny. Under Romanian rule, the institution was known as a lyceum, and, from 1932, was renamed after Carol II.

During World War II, Bessarabia was taken over by the Soviet Union: first with an occupation in 1940–1941, and then, more definitively, with annexation by the Ukrainian SSR (from 1944). It was a regular gymnasium in the Soviet education system, though Bulgarian contributions were still recognized. The dissolution of the Soviet Union turned it into a regular Ukrainian public school, and later into one with an officially recognized Bulgarian focus—one which was also celebrated in Bulgaria, which offers its alumni a number of state scholarships. Since 2010, the high school's name has been lent to Bolgrad Glacier in Sentinel Range, Antarctica.

== History ==
=== Russian project and Moldavian establishment ===
The Russo-Turkish Wars of the late 18th and early 19th century prompted many Bulgarians to leave the Ottoman Empire, which had occupied Bulgaria for centuries, settling in the southern domains of the Russian Empire—and specifically in the Governorate of Bessarabia. These Bessarabian Bulgarians, together with Gagauz people, founded 64 villages in Bessarabia, as well as the cities of Bolhrad and Comrat. As early as 1832, Ukrainian Slavist Yuriy Venelin had suggested that Bolhrad become a centre of Bulgarian culture and education in the Russian Empire; however, the idea was not put into practice at the time. In the 1840s, Governor Pavel Kiselyov obtained the establishment of Bulgarian primary schools throughout the region, and also created a school for land surveyors in Bolhrad. All these were closed down under his successor, Ivan Arandarenko.

After the Crimean War (1853–1856), southern Bessarabia (including Bolhrad) was returned to the Principality of Moldavia, a Romanian-speaking autonomous realm inside the Ottoman domain. Immediately after, Teodor Balș, as Moldavia's Caimacam (Ottoman-appointed regent), made formal pledges that he would uphold the Bulgarians' cultural rights, describing them as victims of Tsarist autocracy; this project was left interrupted by his death. He was succeeded in 1857 by Nicolae Vogoride, who was himself Bulgarian by origin. Bulgarian activist Georgi Sava Rakovski personally lobbied in front of Vogoride for a Bulgarian printing press to be tolerated on Moldavian territory, and was also involved in the high school's opening—by assisting a Bolhrad delegation which submitted its plea to the Caimacam in January 1858. Rakovski was called upon by the other school patrons to help organize the promised institution, but he was prevented from staying in Moldavia by the Sublime Porte and the Austrian Empire, both of which regarded him as a rebel and fugitive.

The work to establish the school fell on a gathering of village assemblies, or obști, which voted in favor of free education for all scions of colonial families. On 10 June 1858 in Iași, the Caimacam granted trust committee members Nikola Parushev and Panayot Grekov a charter permitting the establishment. The charter outlined the goals which the school's establishment set, as well as some basic rules. The high school was open to all colonists, so long as they were of Eastern Orthodox confession. Graduating from the Bolhrad High School would require a total of seven years of education, the first three of which were regarded as progymnasium, or junior high school. Latin, Bulgarian and Romanian were part of the curriculum. Some classes were offered in Church Slavonic and French.

The school had a historical distinction as a major contributor to the Bulgarian National Revival. Its creation as the foremost Bulgarian school in either Moldavia or Wallachia contributed to the immigration of Bulgarians, which for the first time included a sizable cohort of trained teachers—even if, overall, most immigrants favored Bucharest and Brăila. Though located outside Bulgaria, Bolhrad's gymnasium is also remembered as the first institution of its level to offer education to Bulgarians. The institution remained financially independent from state and church, as it relied on income from rents. Owning some 3,500 hectares and a number of punts, as well as three eateries, it had been transferred property over several lakes with fishing grounds—Beleu, Cahul, Cartal, Cugurlui, Ialpug—and also owned one half of Catlabuga and one tenth of Chitai. Traditionally, this sizable estate was curated by a triumvirate of epitropi (trustees). They were selected for three-year terms by 74 delegates of the rural communities (with two delegates per village). 27 "colonies" in Bessarabia were staffed by alumni and subject to the gymnasium's own inspectorate. The school's first director was Sava Radulov of Panagyurishte, succeeded in 1860–1864 by physician Georgi Mirkovich of Sliven.

=== First Romanian period ===
In 1859, Bolhrad and Moldavia had been absorbed by the larger Principality of Romania, with Bucharest as its capital. Voted in as Domnitor, Alexandru Ioan Cuza visited the school in September of that year. In November, Cuza's main ally, Mihai Kogălniceanu, received a letter signed by several Bulgarian burghers, requesting his support for the establishment of a printing press that would serve the needs of the school. From 1860, Cuza's regime began revoking ethnic privileges. Dissatisfaction exploded into violent clashes, and also registered protest by some of the Bulgarian villages, whose inhabitants packed up for Taurida Governorate, joining the Crimean Bulgarians. Over the next three years, Cuza alternated between heavy-handed Romanian nationalism and appreciation for the Bulgarians' input: he looked into a proposal made by Nathanael Boykikev, who wanted the gymnasium to operate as a theological seminary, but also made sure that Nathanael himself would be prevented from becoming the school's headmaster, since he was a "Russophile".

The greater part of Bessarabia, which was under uninterrupted Russian rule during those decades, also inherited a Bulgarian community, which experienced its own struggle for educational autonomy. A "Central Bulgarian School" was established by the Russians at Comrat in 1862. Though its use of the native language was restricted, and it was prevented from owning any property to its name, it was considered superior to Bolhrad's slightly older institution. A "South Slavic Boarding School", established in Mykolaiv by Todor Minkov, also tried to compete with Vogoride's project—and had five Bolhrad natives listed as its students. In his private correspondence with the Russian authorities, Minkov alleged that Bolhrad's school was mediocre, and a sure victim of Romanianization attempts. In contrast, Czech historian Konstantin Jireček argued in 1879 that Bolhrad's was one of the three top Bulgarian institutions of learning, alongside the Gabrovo School and Plovdiv Gymnasium.

Still known to the new authorities and the public as a "Bulgarian school" (Scóla bulgară de la Bolgrad, modernized: Școala bulgară de la Bolgrad), Bolhrad's gymnasium was able to assert its status on the basis of Vogoride's charter. It could set up its own printing press in 1860 or 1861—making Bolhrad one of the largest Bulgarian publishing centers, with its books distributed throughout Rumelia. The epitropi, who purchased the printing presses from Prague, also paid for a multilingual book-and-magazine collection. In 1863, the school had begun ordering other supplies from abroad. As the newspapers reported in December of that year, there was a miscommunication: the board ordered "instruments", and expected to receive scientific tools, but was sent instead musical instruments. The requested objects, including a complete weather station, were received some time after, and continued to be fully functional into the 2020s. Around 1870, the student body formed a cultural club (Subuzhdane) and theatrical society. These in effect promoted Bulgarian nationalism, and had ties with the Bucharest-based Learned Society. Students also published a periodical, called Obsht Trud ("Communal Effort").

Map of the Bulgarian and Gagauz localities with schools subordinated to the Bulgarian Gymnasium; border situation of c. 1860 (under the United Principalities). Also showing the lakes wholly or partly owned by the Gymnasium

Cuza's successor as Domnitor was Carol of Hohenzollern, who also toured the region, and visited the school, in November 1866. The faculty was made up of 13 teachers in 1870, of whom a maximum of four were Romanian (with examples such as A. Sacco, A. Sculetti, and V. Zotta), while all the others were Bulgarian. Scholar Elena Siupiur reports that, in 1875–1882, only two teachers were Romanian, as compared to 19 Bulgarians and 6 Russians (the school also employed one member each from the communities of Poles, Italians, and Czechs). Noted Bulgarian teachers of that time included historian Dimitar Agura, who had studied under Titu Maiorescu, and mathematics professor Hristo Belchev—a Bolhrad native who eventually served as the Bulgarian Minister of Finance. Petar Vulpe, a graduate the gymnasium itself, and of Novorossiya University, who had opted for a career in Romania, taught natural science down to 1878—a colleague of engineers Alexandar Fitov, Ivan Marinov and G. Velev, all of whom lectured in other hard sciences. Vasil Beron, who served for a while as headmaster, was also titular professor of natural science, and V. Kristev provided courses in business education; Sava Berov was for long a music educator.

The school's own edifice was completed in 1873, and officially became a boarding school the following year, when it could host arrivals from as far afield as Thrace and Salonica vilayet. Into the 1930s, the complex remained one of Bolhrad's two imposing buildings, alongside the Transfiguration Cathedral. Between 1858 and 1879, 685 people enrolled at the gymnasium and 214 graduated; of these 214, 203 were ethnic Bulgarians. An early graduate was Olimpi Panov, who became the town engineer before fighting with distinction in the Serbian–Ottoman War of 1876. Other notable students included Aleksandar Malinov, Angel Kanchev, Danail Nikolaev, Dimitar Grekov, Ivan Kolev and Aleksandar Teodorov-Balan. Siupiur counts 72 notable Bulgarian intellectuals who studied at Bolhrad before 1878, from a total 251 who graduated from schools in Romania at any point in that same interval.

The school's revenue in 1869 was recorded at over 180,600 lei, of which 21,176 were collected from leasing out land in Chioselia Mare, and 102,449 from the lakes' administration. In theory, education was provided in Romanian for non-Bulgarians, and all students had to undergo training in Romanian literature for some 21 hours per week; physics and geography were taught in Bulgarian-only, but mathematics was bilingual. A Romanian headmaster, T. Părvu, had a public row with the Bulgarian students in 1870. In the aftermath, the Ministry for Public Instruction issued a formal inquest to determine whether "Bulgarians truly are in charge of that school". On the Bulgarian side, Lyuben Karavelov censured the Romanian state for its continuous push toward Romanianization, but also discussed the teaching staff as divided by countless "intrigues". As reported by George Panu, who was a ministry cadre, there were also continuous tensions between the school's caretakers and the inspectors sent in from Bucharest, precisely because the former cultivated Bulgarian nationalism. According to Panu, the Romanian state had lost its authority by 1874, and Romanian students, sent in from Cahul, were being "forced to learn Bulgarian." In a 1906 overview, historian Gheorghe Ghibănescu opined that Bolhrad's institutions, including the school, had "done little to advance the Romanian vision".

=== Russian takeover and Romanian reintegration ===
In 1876, just two years before Romania lost control of southern Bessarabia, the institution was briefly called "Romanian Lyceum". The Russo-Turkish War of 1877–1878, which brought about the Liberation of Bulgaria, was enthusiastically backed by the Bulgarian colony in both areas of Bessarabia. At Bolhrad, a recruitment campaign for the Bulgarian legions was mounted by Panov, the returning alumnus. The entirety of senior students, as well as a large number of juniors, volunteered for service in those units, while school administrators ran benefits which resulted in the purchase of arms and supplies. In 1879, after the region had reverted once again to the Russian monarchy, the school gradually lost its entirely Bulgarian character, and was simply called the "Bolgrad Eight-year Gymnasium". The printing press was disestablished and, on 13 March 1884, the school itself was renamed after Alexander III of Russia.

The all-new Russian staff included K. Myslavsky, who published a monograph of the institution—referred to under its new, imperial name—, and N. Svyatsky, who was for a while the headmaster. Joining them was S. Potocki, who collected historical object from throughout the region and sent them to be exhibited at a state museum in Kishinev. Russian-era alumni included Konstantin Gedroits, later famous as a soil scientist. Conversely, many Bulgarian alumni entered Russian academia, in particular after going through tertiary training at Kiev and Novorossiya universities. Examples include V. K. Vasiliev, who returned to teach physics at his alma mater. A significant number of the students remained Bulgarians, and the Bulgarian language, history and geography have been part of the gymnasium's curriculum for most of its later existence, including today.

For much of the 1910s, Gavril Bezvikonny, supported by the Bulgarian and German colonists, was the regional navigation inspector. His attempt to link the southern Bessarabian lakes with the Danube Delta through a series of canals was vetoed by the high school, which stood to lose its fishing income. Under Russian rule, some ethnic Romanians were also assigned to teach at the gymnasium. Before 1914, they included Gheorghe Fotescu, who was at the time a visible atheist, but who later formed his own sect within the Russian Orthodox Church. In 1914, the Russian authorities assigned another Bessarabian Romanian, Ștefan Ciobanu, to a teaching position at the gymnasium. After the Russian Revolution of February 1917, he involved himself in the struggle for Bessarabian autonomy, which resulted in the establishment of a Moldavian Democratic Republic on Governorate territory; at an early stage in this process, Ciobanu also represented the local Zemstvo at the Bessarabian Teachers' Congress, where he advocated for a Romanian-centered curriculum. The revolution provided the Bolhrad community with an explicit right to reorganize the school as a Bulgarian enterprise: in 1917, teachers such as H. Mitanov and V. Stoianovich were using textbooks printed in Bulgarian monasteries in history and language classes for the local youth.

As a result of the 1918 union process Bessarabia was included in the Kingdom of Romania (or "Greater Romania"), with Bolhrad's becoming "the country's richest high school." Initially, in August 1918, the Bessarabian Directorate for Education recognized Bolhrad's as a Bulgarian-led school, but this consensus was overturned by the centralizing politicians in Bucharest: in December, after virtually all Bulgarians had been persuaded to enlist their children in minority-only schools, all of the latter were banned and integrated with regular Romanian education. The Bessarabian Directorate began replacing Russian teachers with Romanians from Bessarabia and elsewhere. On 1 September 1918, Bolhrad had received its first Romanian headmaster of the post-imperial era, Marcu Ilie Văluță. The following year, after having again been denied communal privileges, the Bulgarian community mandated Mitanov and S. Yurchevich with procuring schoolbooks from Southern Dobruja; in tandem, I. A. Konstantinov proceeded to open clandestine schools throughout southern Bessarabia. They were all detained by the Siguranța, and acquitted following the intervention of Bessarabian politicians (upon being set free, Konstantinov fled to the Kingdom of Bulgaria).

The unification process split the community of students: activists in support of pan-Romanian nationalism included Ciobanu and Bolhrad alumnus Chiril Sberea, the latter of whom served as a soldiers' representative in the Moldavian assembly, personally voting for union; among those who rejected this new arrangement was another Bolhrad alumnus, Pavel Chioru, who swam across the Dniester into the Soviet Union, served in the Red Army and the Cheka during the Russian Civil War, and emerged as a founding figure of the rump Moldavian Autonomous Soviet Socialist Republic. In 1920, Văluță hosted King Ferdinand and his Queen, Marie of Romania, who were said to have been pleasantly impressed that all students spoke Romanian. However, in March of the next year, the Romanian authorities launched an investigation into the school's ownership claims over Ialpug Lake and into the provenance of its cash reserves, valued at 900,000 Russian rubles. In January 1922, Mihail Vlădescu, who was serving as Minister of Agriculture, indicated his willingness to expropriate the school's entire land fund.

=== Interwar Romanianization ===
Văluță proceeded to "Romanianize the school in its entirety", and declared that the goal had been accomplished by 1924. In January 1925, two eight-year students, named as "Boris Tivceff and V. Onifrei", were expelled for "anti-national agitation." In February, when General Vasile Rudeanu visited Bolhrad, he was welcomed by a delegation of teachers, one of whom asked that the school be named after "Trajan's Wall", attesting to the Romanians' Latin origin. Some staff was kept on: religion continued to be taught by Ivan Ivanov, a priest and former Russian army officer, from 1922 to his retirement later that decade. The school managed to preserve control over the lakes, causing much resentment among local fishermen: in July 1927, the newly formed Federation of Romanian Fishermen heard a report by D. Voloviev, who claimed that the epitropi had imposed scandalous conditions on co-operatives formed at Reni and Ismail.

Even after 1925, the gymnasium, known as the "Bolgrad Boys' Lyceum" (Liceul de băieți din Bolgrad), was touched by controversy, with allegations that its headmasters were again cultivating Bulgarian nationalism, and actively pushing out Romanian teachers, in connivance with the students. According to an anonymous report published by Universul in July 1931, it was purposefully ignoring the law on ethnic proportionality, giving preference to staff who had graduated from the Sofia University, and recruiting some 80% of its scholarship students from among the ethnic minorities. From October 1927, the school's main caretaker was Petre Chiobaș, who had reportedly garnered support from the local Romanians, promising to grant scholarships outside the Bulgarians' ethnic circle. As administrator, he was seconded by Terezi and Mircef; the institution had a budget of 10 million lei, largely sourced from Ialpug Lake. That same month, its physics laboratory was allegedly robbed by a student, Vladimir Emiano, with instruments being used for setting up a radio station at another lyceum. Around 1930, when Romanian Bessarabia was dominated by the National Peasants' Party, the trustees included H. Hristoforov and Boris Kamburov, who were themselves members of that political group. Also then, Ialpug and Cugurlui were leased to Năvodul, a fishing co-operative which had backing from the Federation of Fishermen; this decision nearly bankrupted another local union, located at Necrasovca-Nouă, leading to an unresolved labor conflict. Năvodul proceeded to clamp down on poachers. During one of the resulting raids, a fisherman from Barta will shot and killed by groundskeeper Nichifor Evdochimov, and Năvodul was forced to pay reparations to the victim's family.

At some point in 1932, the lyceum was officially renamed after Carol II (Liceul de băieți Carol al II-lea), who took it under his royal patronage. This initiative was credited to the headmaster, Atanase Melnicov; Carol's birthday, on 16 October, was also celebrated as the school's own official day. During this second Romanian interval, the alumni included two Gagauz boys who went on to affiliate with Turkish nationalism and Kemalism: agronomist Rustem Aksel (graduated 1929) and historian Özdemir Çobanoğlu (1934). Vladimir Cavarnali, a poet and Romanian loyalist of mixed Bulgarian and Gagauz heritage, was both an alumnus (1928) and professor (1933–1940). The school had continued as a financially self-sufficient center of learning: in 1932, it still had a budget of 1.8 million lei, with only some 500,000 being used to house and feed its 450 boarding-house interns. In these circumstances, the Bulgarian trustees decided to donate profits toward the upkeep of primary schools in places such as Cartal, Etulia, Frecăței, Împuțita, and Vulcănești. Its monopoly on the lakes was being questioned by the local peasants, who reported to Senator Ion Chirilov that they were prevented from fishing by the school's own tenant farmers.

Within two years of the revamping, Simion Botușanu (or Botoșanu), who took over as the main trustee, was collecting an income of some 20 million lei annually, supplying some 500 scholarships, as well as providing funds for the girls' schools of Bolhrad and Cahul—alongside 38 village schools, spread out throughout the surrounding area (including an entirely new one in Pocrovca-Nouă). In addition to sponsoring a new vocational school in Bolhrad, from 1935 the lyceum began organizing its own vocational sections. Melnicov was sent to Giurgiu and Soroca, where he observed the local schools of agriculture and fish farming, using them as models for activities in his own school. Such activities continued to be tinged by controversy, deep into the 1930s. Botușanu reported that the Hristoforov–Kamburov administration had reduced the available funds down to 32,900 lei, accumulating debts of 2 million. He also claimed that National Peasantist regime had allowed them to make illegal use of the fishing grounds.

The school's newfound preference for working with fishing co-operatives was reported in the press as an economic miracle: fish production was said to have increased from 840,000 kilograms in 1930 to 2.36 million kilograms in 1932. It continued to draw much revenue from its leasing of Beleu Lake, which appeared to be extremely rich in fish. By 1937, official investigators were alleging that the leaseholders were in fact smugglers, who had illegally drawn fish out of Brateș, on the other bank of the Prut, and were declaring it at Bolhrad. The Ministry of Public Instruction was by then persuaded that the lyceum was earning too much money from its rents, and opted to sue over the issue. Botușanu endorsed this move from within the trustees' council, which resulted in tensions surrounding his reelection in January 1935; that event also witnessed additional tensions between the Bulgarians and other communities, with representatives of the latter issuing a public letter of protest.

=== World War II and Soviet era ===
In early 1937, during the final stages of Greater Romania, the local students, assisted by teacher Gheorghe Bujoreanu, were putting out a Romanian-language magazine called Familia Noastră ("Our Family"); it was later edited by Cavarnali. Also in 1937, the advent of antisemitism pushed Romanian Jewish youths from Galați to disperse among regular schools around the country, with some matriculating in Bolhrad. In 1938–1940, Carol suspended democracy in favor of a single-party regime, centered on the National Renaissance Front—whose youth movement was called Straja Țării. The lyceum was integrated within this trend. In June 1938, upon the inauguration of Bolhrad Stadium, the scool's Straja teams faced off a selection of amateur athletes from Cahul, winning victories in association football, as well as in track and field and grenade-throwing. In August 1939, Straja organized a regional training camp at Volcioc. Fifteen teachers who were advanced to mid-level executive positions in the regional Straja; most of them were Bolhrad lyceum cadres, sent in by the trustees. At the time, artistic education was handled by painter Dumitru Sghibarțev, who won acclaim for his own paintings of the city.

Bolhrad remained Romanian-ruled until the Soviet invasion in June 1940; like all of southern Bessarabia, it was annexed to the Ukrainian SSR. The school's collection, featuring "all the famous European and Russian magazines of the time, as well as all Bulgarian periodicals", was evacuated to Bucharest, and, by 1998, had been left in a book depository. Some students also left the city as refugees—they include a future politician, Nicu Stăncescu; among the teaching staff, Cavarnali was for a while trapped in Soviet territory, and went into hiding. Romania joined the Axis powers and, in mid-1941, was able to pushed back into the region. All Bessarabian schools, including Bolhrad's (with its fish-farming annex) were reopened on 1 September. Now simply known as "Bolgrad Lyceum", it was briefly controlled by the Romanian-led Bessarabia Governorate; in October 1942, there were renewed calls for the Romanian state to confiscate its lakes. In 1943, teacher Pavel Șamurai created its sporting club, which ran volleyball competitions. On 19 August 1944, just as the Red Army had begun its reconquest of Bessarabia, the school announced that any students still present in the region could show up for courses and examinations.

The coup of 23 August took Romania out of the Axis, and allowed for the Soviet re-annexation of Bessarabia. Bolhrad's gymnasium was afterwards fully integrated with the Soviet education system, "no different from other educational institutions of regional significance, its history and traditions [being] consigned to oblivion." The lakes were collectivized and, by 1970, Ialpug (or Yalpuh) area was home to a large summer camp for the Young Pioneers. Damming in the 1960s had isolated the lake from the Danube Delta, causing a buildup of chemical waste in the water, and leading to a severe ecological crisis in 1988. In a 1990 piece, Maria Bulgaru of Kartal observed that "almost nothing remains of what once made up the pride of this unique corner of the earth, which had been a priceless historical treasure".

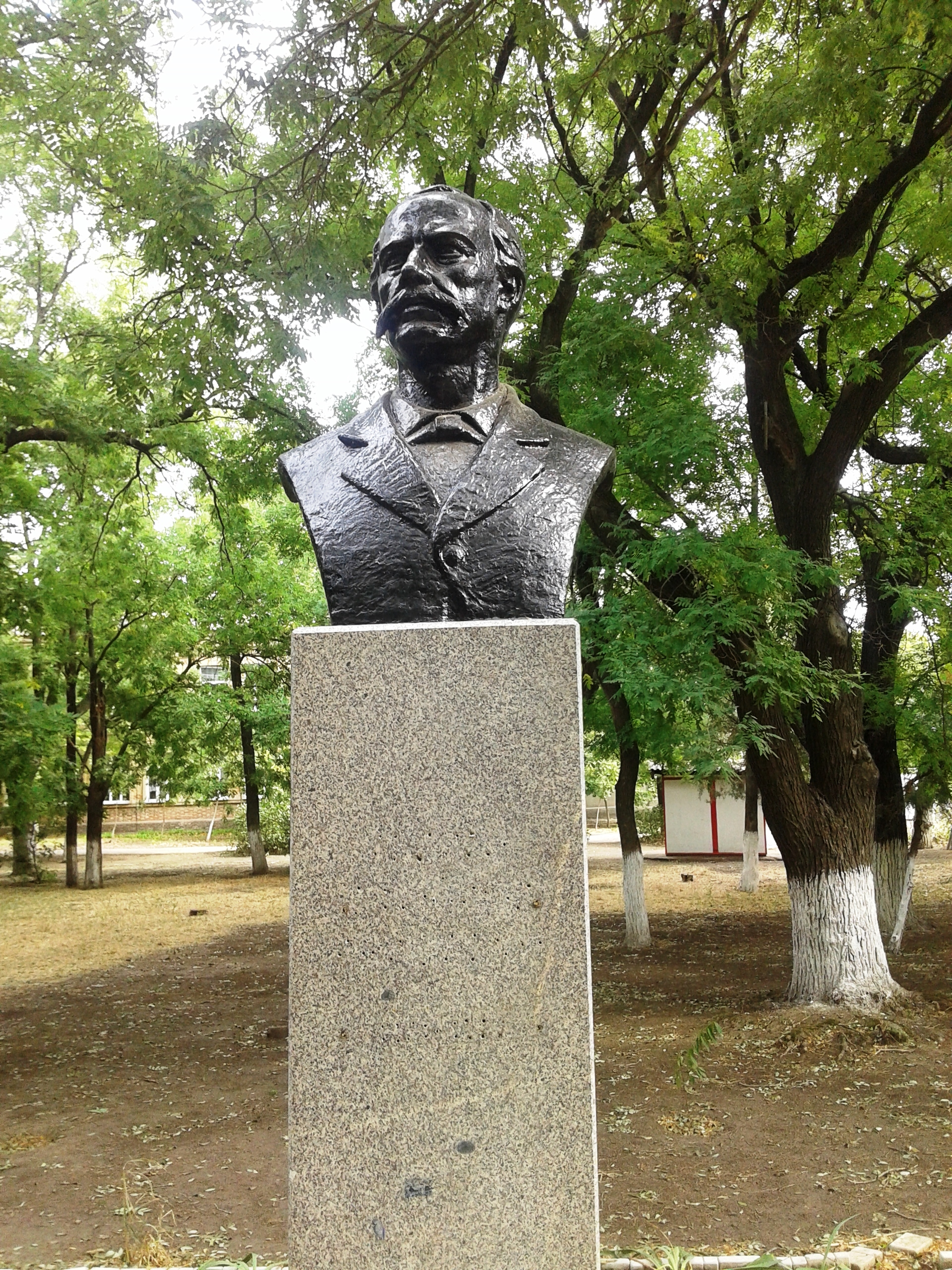
Monument to Georgi Sava Rakovski in the garden near the school

Despite its downgrading, the gymnasium was still occasionally presented as a Bulgarian-specialized school ("the first gymnasium in the history of the Bulgarian people"), but also as one created by the Russian Empire; it was additionally celebrated as the alma mater of communist leader Asen Hristev and of poet Teodor Nencev. In 1968, the Bulgarian People's Republic issued a series of stamps celebrating the gymnasium and its legacy. The school and its former network of Bulgarian institutions continued to be viewed as rightfully belonging to the community. During the Perestroika experiment of the 1980s, Bessarabian Bulgarians formed a "Cyril and Methodius Society", which was tasked with reclaiming education in the vernacular. It sent delegates to the 27th Congress of the Communist Party of the Soviet Union (March 1986), and obtained approval for optional courses in Bulgarian. The initiative was resisted by the authorities of Bolhrad Raion, who saw it as evidence of a nationalist or "extremist" resurgence.

== In modern Ukraine ==
In the early 1990s, the dissolution of the Soviet Union saw Bolhrad and the Bessarabian Bulgarians included in independent Ukraine. The new state established diplomatic relations with Bulgaria, allowing for negotiations on the issue of community schools; Bulgarian diplomats, including Georgi Danailov and Rusko Dzhamdzhiev, were able to obtain "a new concept for education at the Bolhrad Gymnasium, and resolved issues of admitting Ukrainian citizens of Bulgarian origin to secondary and higher educational institutions in Bulgaria on special terms." The school, folded within the Ukrainian education system, was formally reassigned to the Bulgarian community in 1993, and pedagogues from Bulgaria were called in to provide the specialized teaching. Its student body accommodated members of other historically Bulgarian communities, such as those in Mykolaiv and Zaporizhzhia, though it continued to include of other ethnic groups (primarily Ukrainians) from throughout Odesa Oblast. It also extended its educational offer, opening up its own primary schools, and thus guaranteeing Bulgarian-centered education for the full 12 years. In 1999, it took Rakovski's name. Eleven years later, a part of the Sentinel Range in Antarctica was renamed "Bolgrad Glacier", specifically in honor of the institution.

In its new form, Rakovski was directly involved with maintaining the Bessarabian Bulgarians' national traditions—including vocal performances and folk dancing, respectively headlinged by the school's Zdravets and Horo ensembles (one dating from 1997, and the other from 2001). Rakovski students have traditionally earned first prize at the Bulgarian-language contest (or "Olympics"), annually sanctioned by the Ministry of Education and Science of Ukraine (MONU); winners are guaranteed tuition-free and automatic enrollment at one of Bulgaria's universities. Meanwhile, the school's role in preserving Bulgarian identity in front of voluntary or mandatory Ukrainization was at the center of public debates in the first two decades of the 3rd millennium. Ion Popescu, the Romanian Ukrainian activist, observed in 2003 that the Bulgarian community was dwindling, despite not emigrating from Ukraine; as he put it: "The newspaper Roden Krai, the Bolhrad gymnasium, and classes held in the mother tongue only as an optional subject cannot present a challenge to assimilation!" According to a 2018 report by journalist Desislava Semkovska, "the high school is one of the most prestigious educational institutions in Southern Ukraine. [...] Thanks to the revival of Bulgarian folk traditions, customs and holidays, the school is increasingly becoming a cultural and spiritual center of the Bulgarians in Bessarabia."

In this new incarnation, the gymnasium was not returned control of the lakes and other properties, and came to rely on a reduced budget provided by the Odesa Oblast Council. It also received MONU research grants, including for a program on the "Education of high school students in a multicultural environment" (2016–2022). The institution's 160th anniversary, held in October 2018, was attended by Boyko Borisov, as Prime Minister of Bulgaria, and Petro Poroshenko, as President of Ukraine. Borisov announced that five teachers and thirty students would be welcomed for an exchange program in Sofia, and pledged 150,000 leva for the school's "material and technical equipment". Also then, the newly renovated school hosted 430 students, including 60 first-graders; it had been fitted to accommodate distance education. As of 2023, it was under headmistress Snezhana Skorich. That year, it had 523 students from 18 (mostly Bulgarian) communities, providing a dormitory and free transportation to students from the more villages. It also houses an ethnographic exhibit and a history museum (which displays Vogoride's 1858 charter), and publishes the student magazine Zdravei ("Hello"). Skorich expressed worries about the renewed Ukrainization efforts, and specifically about a set of language laws which appeared to threaten the Rakovski's continued existence as a Bulgarian-focused school.

== See also ==
- Fontanka School
