= Tabani, Briceni =

Tabani
- Village
- Location in Moldova
- Coordinates: 48°18′44″N 27°05′51″E
- Country: Moldova
- District: Briceni District

Area
  - Total: 9.75 sq mi (25.26 km^{2})
- Elevation: 833 ft (254 m)

Population (2014 census)
  - Total: 2,783
  - Density: 285.3/sq mi (110.2/km^{2})
- Time zone: UTC+2 (EET)
  - Summer (DST): UTC+3 (EEST)
- Postal code: MD-4738
- Area code: +373 247

Tabani is a village in Briceni District, Moldova. It lies at an elevation of 254 m.

== Notable people ==
- Ion Ciocanu
- Valentin Tomuleţ
