= Isacova =

- Commune and village
- Location in Moldova
- Coordinates: 47°22′N 28°43′E
- Country: Moldova
- District: Orhei District
- Elevation: 548 ft (167 m)

Population (2014 census)
  - Total: 1,620
- Time zone: UTC+2 (EET)
  - Summer (DST): UTC+3 (EEST)
- Postal code: MD-3531
- Area code: +373 235

Isacova is a village in Orhei District, Moldova.

== History ==
Isacova is an old village in Orhei County, inhabited mostly by descendants of small land owners from medieval times ("razesi" (razashi) and "mazili"). According to one of the earliest documents mentioning Isacova, in 1645 is set the limit between Isacova and Orhei.

== Notable people ==
- Teodor Uncu
- Gavril Buciușcan
