= Dridu =

- Commune
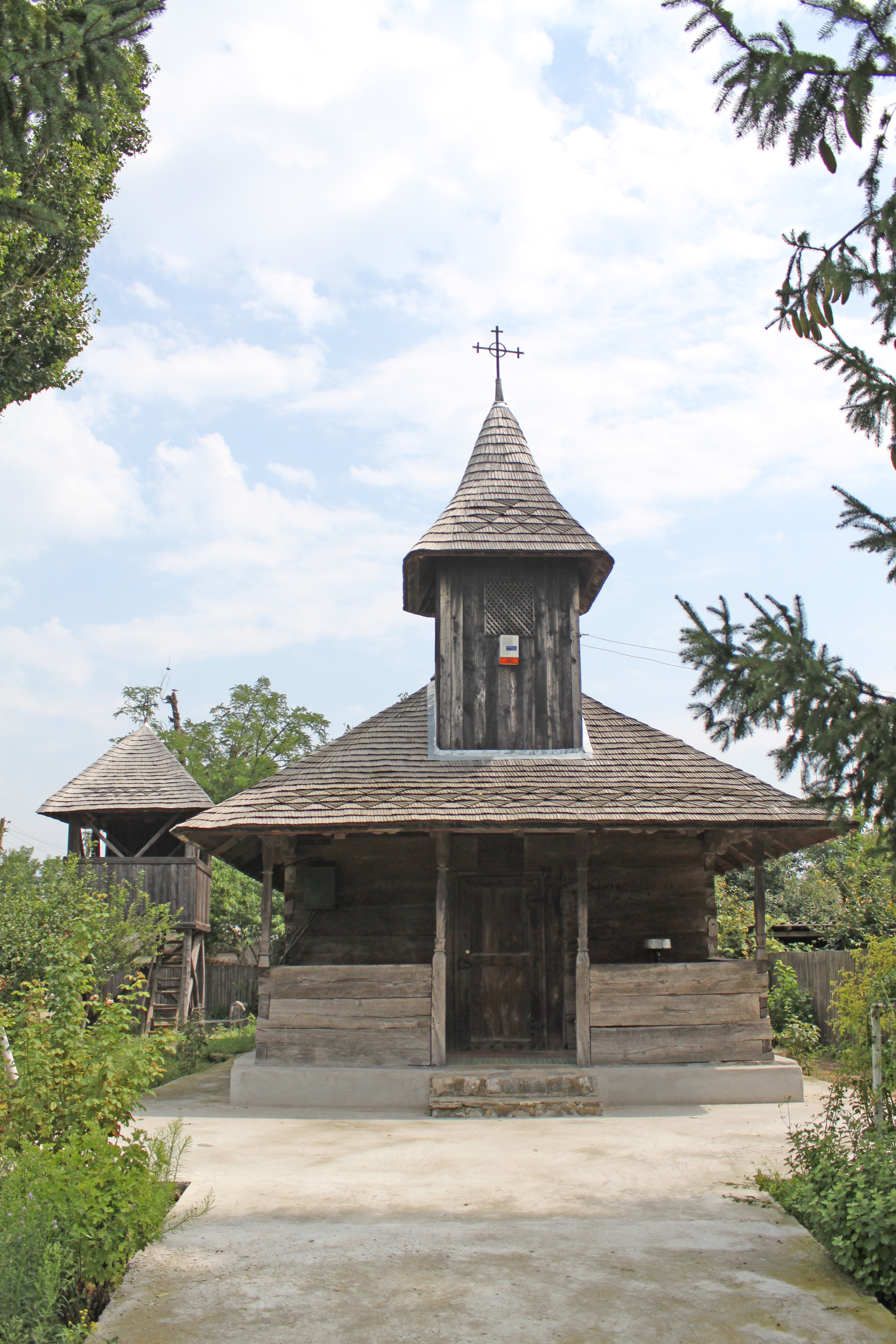
- Wooden church of Dridu-Snagov

- Location in Ialomița County

- Location in Romania
- Coordinates: 44°42′N 26°27′E
- Country: Romania
- County: Ialomița

Government
  - Mayor (2024–2028): Lucian Dumitru (PSD)
- Area: 71 km^{2} (27 sq mi)
- Elevation: 73 m (240 ft)
- Population (2021-12-01): 3,213
  - Density: 45/km^{2} (120/sq mi)
- Time zone: UTC+02:00 (EET)
  - Summer (DST): UTC+03:00 (EEST)
- Postal code: 927105
- Area code: +(40) 243
- Vehicle reg.: IL
- Website: www.primariadridu.ro

Dridu is a commune located in Ialomița County, Muntenia, Romania. It is composed of two villages, Dridu and Dridu-Snagov. It also included the village of Moldoveni until 2005, when it was split off to form Moldoveni Commune.

Covering a surface of 71 km^{2} (27 sq mi), Dridu is situated in the west of Ialomița County, on the right bank of the Ialomița River, at its confluence with the Prahova River. The commune is 80 km (50 mi) away from the county seat, Slobozia, 18 km (11 mi) from Urziceni, and 50 km (31 mi) from the national capital, Bucharest.

The origin of the name lost in the mist of history, some documents shows "Dridih" as origin (Radu cel Mare's manuscript) others "Dridova" (Vladislav The Third's manuscript).

The first documented naming of the village dates from 28 October 1464, when Radu cel Frumos donated the lands to the Snagov Monastery. In the second part of the 18th century a small wooden church was built, with very interesting sculpted pillars and no fresco. Some of the original parts are in a new wooden church built after a dig was built and the waters rose above the church level. After the Romanian Revolution of 1989, a new monastery was built over the remaining of Dridu culture (Quaternary relict ware found there).

Historical population
Year	Pop.	±%
1899	2,677	—
1925	4,318	+61.3%
2002	3,765	−12.8%
2011	3,551	−5.7%
2021	3,213	−9.5%
Source: Census data

At the 2011 census, Dridu had 3,551 inhabitants. At the 2021 census, the commune had a population of 3,213, of which 95.75% were ethnic Romanians.
