= Micleușeni =

- Commune
- Location in Moldova
- Coordinates: 47°07′N 28°18′E
- Country: Moldova
- District: Strășeni District

Population (2014)
  - Total: 2,343
- Time zone: UTC+2 (EET)
  - Summer (DST): UTC+3 (EEST)
- Postal code: MD-6431
- Area code: +373 264

Micleușeni is a commune in Strășeni District, Moldova. It is composed of two villages, Huzun and Micleușeni.

== Notable people ==
- Vasile Bahnaru
