= Fontanka School =

- Фонтанська школа

Location
- Odesa; 46.5782244°N 30.8599568°E

Information
- Denomination: Ukrainian Orthodox
- Founded: 1965
- Director: Vyacheslav Viktorovich Baranov
- Website: fontankaschool.at.ua
- Last updated: 9 January 2018

Fontanka School of social rehabilitation is a school and orphanage for delinquent children where they receive care to improve their pedagogical, psychological and physical health. The school of social rehabilitation is located close to Odesa city, 4 kilometers north of Odesa Kotovskiy (Kotovskogo) District, in the small village of Fontanka on the coast of the Black Sea.

It is the only school in Ukraine that conducts scientific research in the field of Psychology and Pedagogy of delinquent children. The school has won multiple awards for its scientific research achievements.

The pupils of the school obtain secondary education, labor and vocational skills, which gives them the opportunity to continue their education in colleges or universities or find job in Ukraine once they have graduated from the Fontanka School.

The director of the school, Vyacheslav Viktorovich Baranov, was enmeshed in a scandal about the death of a student, Misha Nikitin.

== See also ==
- Bolhrad High School
