= Ion Ciocanu =

Moldovan writer (1940–2021)

Ion Ciocanu OR
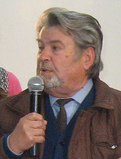
- Ciocanu in 2011
- Born: January 18, 1940; Tabani, Kingdom of Romania
- Died: July 2, 2021 (aged 81); Chișinău, Moldova
- Education: Moldova State University
- Awards: Om emerit Gloria muncii

Ion Ciocanu (18 January 1940 – 2 July 2021) was a Moldovan literary critic.

== Biography ==
Ion Ciocanu was born on January 18, 1940, in Tabani, Briceni, then in Romania. Ion Ciocanu graduated from Moldova State University in 1962 and got his PhD in 1965. He worked for Moldova State University, "Cartea Moldovenească", "Literatura artistică", "Hyperion", Glasul Naţiunii, Editura Litera. Between 1987 and 1990 he was a leader of the Moldovan Writers' Union. He has been working for the Institute of Philology of the Academy of Sciences of Moldova since 2001.

Between 1993 and 1994, Ion Ciocanu served as Director General of the State Department of Languages (Romanian: Departamentul de Stat al Limbilor) and between 1998 and 2001 he served as the head of the Division of the Promotion of Official Language (Romanian: Direcţia Promovare a Limbii Oficiale).

== Awards ==
- Om emerit, 1990
- Gloria Muncii, 1996
- Medalia "Mihai Eminescu", 2000
- Diploma săptămânalului Literatura şi Arta "pentru tenacitatea cu care apără limba română", 2003
- Diploma revistei Limba Română "pentru eleganţa şi profunzimea discursului, colaborare permanentă şi contribuţie substanţială la ocrotirea şi promovarea "celui mai sfânt şi mai scump odor" – Limba Română", 2001
- Premiul Pro didactica al Ministerului Culturii, 2009
- Laureat al publicaţiilor Literatura şi Arta (1997, 2000, 2001, 2003, 2004, 2005, 2007, 2008, 2009), Moldova Suverană (1990, 1993).
- Membru al colegiilor de redacţie ale revistelor Limba Română, Viaţa Basarabiei, Revistă de lingvistică şi ştiinţă literară.
- The award for literary criticism

== Works ==
- Caractere şi conflicte, Chişinău (1968),
- Articole şi cronici literare, Chişinău (1969),
- Itinerar critic, Chişinău (1973),
- Unele probleme de estetică, Chişinău (1973),
- Dialog continuu, Chişinău (1977),
- Podurile vieţii şi ale creaţiei, Chişinău (1978),
- Clipa de graţie, Chişinău (1980),
- Paşii lui Vladimir Curbet, Chişinău (1982),
- Permanenţe, Chişinău (1983),
- Argumentul de rigoare, Chişinău (1985),
- Dreptul la critică, Chişinău (1993).
- Reflecţii şi atitudini, Chişinău (1993),
- Dincolo de literă, Timişoara (1998),
- Literatura română contemportană din Republica Moldova, Chişinău (1998),
- Rigorile şi splendorile prozei rurale, Chişinău (2000),
- Scriitori de ieri şi de azi București (2004),
- Ion Ciocanu. Biobibliografie Chişinău, Ed. Museum (2005).
- Atât de drag... Microeseuri de dragoste pentru cuvânt, Chişinău, (1995),
- Zborul frânt al limbii române (1999),
- Realitatea în cuvânt şi cuvântul în realitate (2002),
- Conştientizarea greşelii (2003),
- Temelia nemuririi noastre, Chişinău, (2005).

== Bibliography ==
- Povară sau tezaur sfânt? Culegere de articole (scrse cu alfabet rusesc) alcătuită de Ilie Lupan, Chişinău, 1989
- Ciocanu, Ion, Reflecţii şi atitudini, Chişinău, Editura Hyperion, 1992
- Ciocanu, Ion, Atât de drag... Microeseuri de dragoste pentru cuvânt, Chişinău, 1995
- Ciocanu, Ion, Literatura română contemportană din Republica Moldova, Chişinău, 1998
- Ciocanu, Ion, Zborul frânt al limbii române, Chişinău, 1999
- Ciocanu, Ion, Conştientizarea greşelii, Chişinău, Editura Litera, 2003
