= Tătărești, Cahul =

Tătărești
- Village
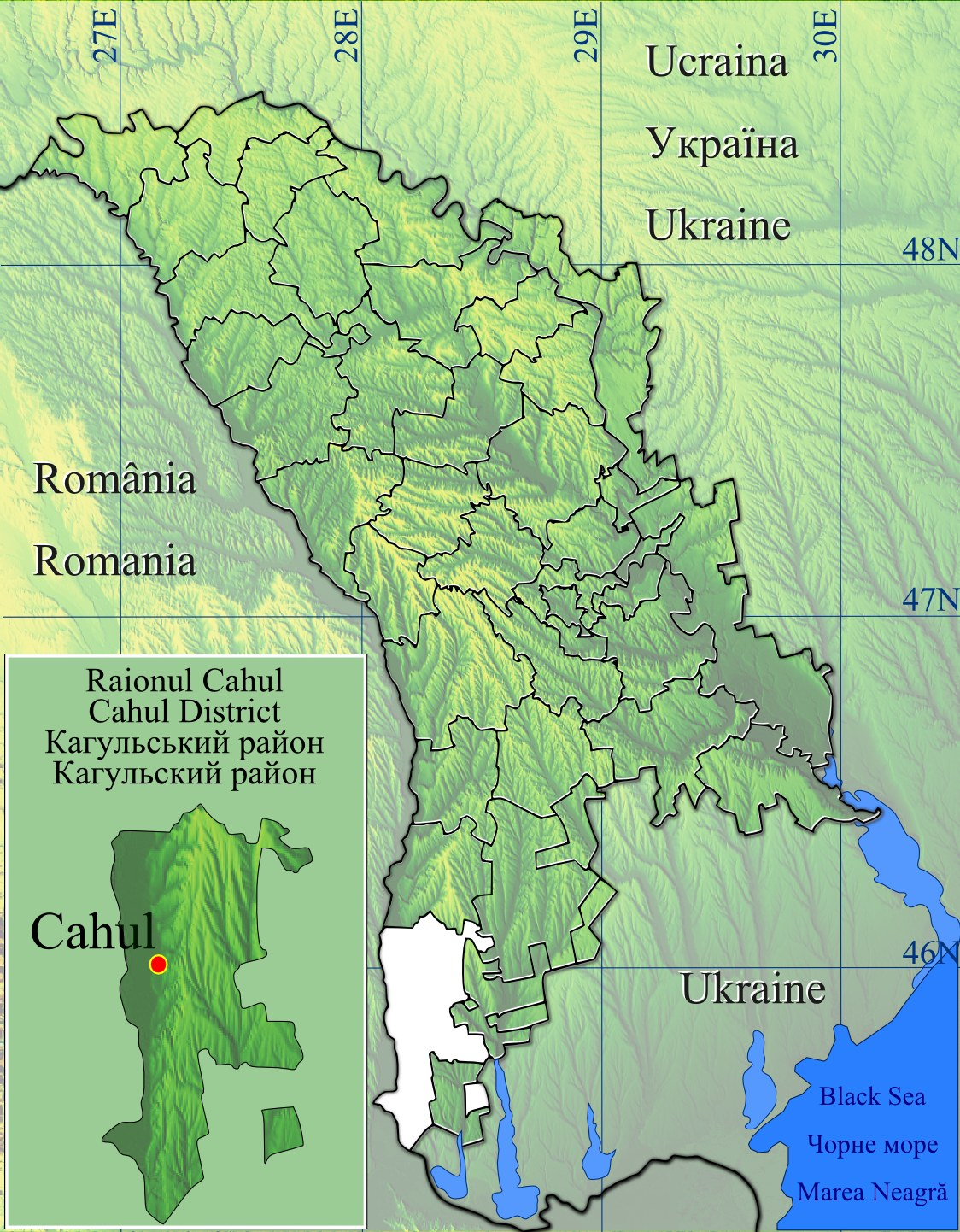
- Location within Cahul
- Coordinates: 46°01′38″N 28°20′49″E
- Country: Moldova
- District: Cahul District

Government
  - Mayor: Deonis Mihai (PDM)

Population (2014 census)
  - Total: 1,682
- Time zone: UTC+2 (EET)
  - Summer (DST): UTC+3 (EEST)
- Postal code: MD-3931

Tătărești (formerly Tatar-Baurci) is a village in Cahul District, Moldova.
