= Cetireni =

- Village
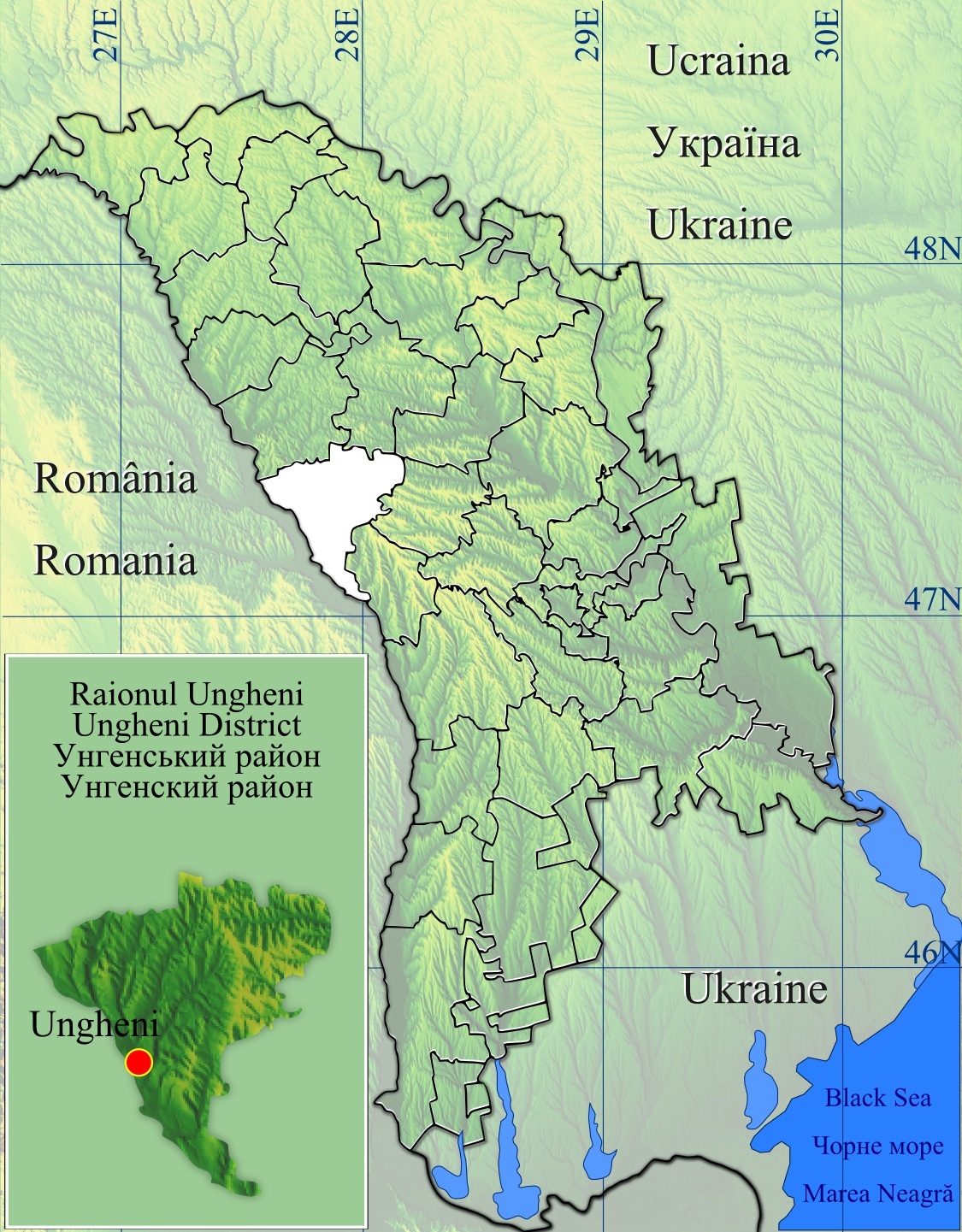
- Location within Ungheni
- Coordinates: 47°12′55″N 27°54′54″E
- Country: Moldova

Government
  - Mayor: Ana Dicusar (PLDM)

Population (2014 census)
  - Total: 1,808
- Time zone: UTC+2 (EET)
  - Summer (DST): UTC+3 (EEST)
- Postal code: MD-3617

Cetireni is a village in Ungheni District, Moldova.
