= Orlivka, Izmail Raion, Odesa Oblast =

Rural locality in Odesa Oblast, Ukraine

Orlivka Орлівка (Ukrainian) Cartal (Romanian)
- Village
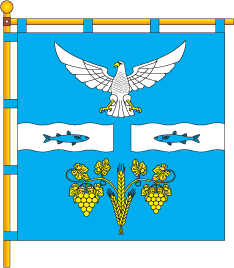
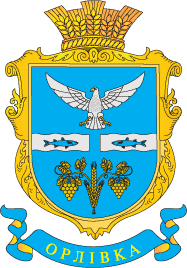
- Flag Coat of arms
- Interactive map of Orlivka
- Location in Ukraine Orlivka (Ukraine)
- Coordinates: 45°19′10″N 28°27′2″E
- Country: Ukraine
- Oblast: Odesa Oblast
- Raion: Izmail Raion
- Hromada: Reni urban hromada
- Time zone: UTC+2 (EET)
  - Summer (DST): UTC+3 (EEST)

Orlivka (Ukrainian: Орлівка; Romanian: Cartal) is a village in Izmail Raion, Odesa Oblast, southern Ukraine. It belongs to Reni urban hromada, one of the hromadas of Ukraine.

Until 18 July 2020, Orlivka belonged to Reni Raion. The raion was abolished in July 2020 as part of the administrative reform of Ukraine, which reduced the number of raions of Odesa Oblast to seven. The area of Reni Raion was merged into Izmail Raion.

== Location ==
Orlivka is located at 45°19′N 28°26′E between Lakes Kartal, Kahul and the river Danube.

== History ==
Around 2nd century BC, a Celtic tribe settled the area and founded the town of Aliobrix. Later, from 1st to 3rd centuries AD, the site was further expanded by Romans who built the fortress nearby.

Later and until 1948 it was known as Cartal.

== Demographics ==
According to the 2001 census, the vast majority of the 3047 inhabitants, 95.37%, were Romanian speakers at the time, including 95.14% who called the language "Moldovan" (2,899 people), and 0.23% who called it "Romanian" (7 people), with a small number of Russian (1.61%, or 49) and Ukrainian speakers (1.25%, or 38).

On 4 September, a 1st-grade class with Romanian-language education at the Oryol Lyceum in Orlivka was closed after only four days following the start of the school year after the students' parents were invited to the school to request the transfer of their children to a Ukrainian-language class. The students' parents reported pressure and threats to change their children's study plan. This pressure had been taking place throughout the summer, and as of 4 September, the parents had had to rewrite their children's enrollment applications a total of six times.

The case prompted the intervention of the Ministry of Foreign Affairs of Romania, and it was discussed by Nicușor Dan and Volodymyr Zelenskyy, the presidents of Romania and Ukraine respectively. On 18 September, the 1st-grade Romanian-language class was formally reopened, resuming classes on 21 September. Seven children re-enrolled in the reopened class, out of an original eight students between 1 and 4 September.

== Infrastructure ==
Through the village passes highway Odesa–Reni, while on the banks of the Danube the Orlivka – Isaccea Ferry service was built in 2019. Portions of the Odesa–Reni Highway between Reni and Orlivka follow a narrow strip between Lake Cahul and the Danube.

During the Russian invasion of Ukraine in 2022-23, the Isaccea-Orlivka Danube crossing has developed into an important port, offering an alternative to the blockaded Ukrainian Black Sea ports.

== Notable people ==
- Pavel Chioru (1902–c. 1937), Moldovan journalist, folklorist, and communist activist
