= Vasile Bahnaru =

Moldovan historian (1949–2024)

Vasile Bahnaru OR

Member of the Commission for the Study of the Communist Dictatorship in Moldova
- In office January 14, 2010 – July 2, 2010

Personal details
- Born: 24 October 1949 Micleușeni, Moldavian SSR, USSR
- Died: 6 August 2024 (aged 74)
- Party: Popular Front of Moldova
- Education: Moldova State University

Vasile Bahnaru (24 October 1949 – 6 August 2024) was a Moldovan philologist.

== Biography ==
Vasile Bahnaru was a founder of the Popular Front of Moldova. He was a member of the Commission for the Study of the Communist Dictatorship in Moldova, and was later the acting director of the Academy's Philology Institute. Bahnaru died on 6 August 2024, at the age of 74.

== Awards ==
"Grigore Vieru" Prize of the Academy of Sciences of Moldova, worth L 30,000 (about US$1700).

== Works ==
The monograph Elements of Romanian Semasiology
