= Moldoveni, Ialomița =

Moldoveni
- Commune
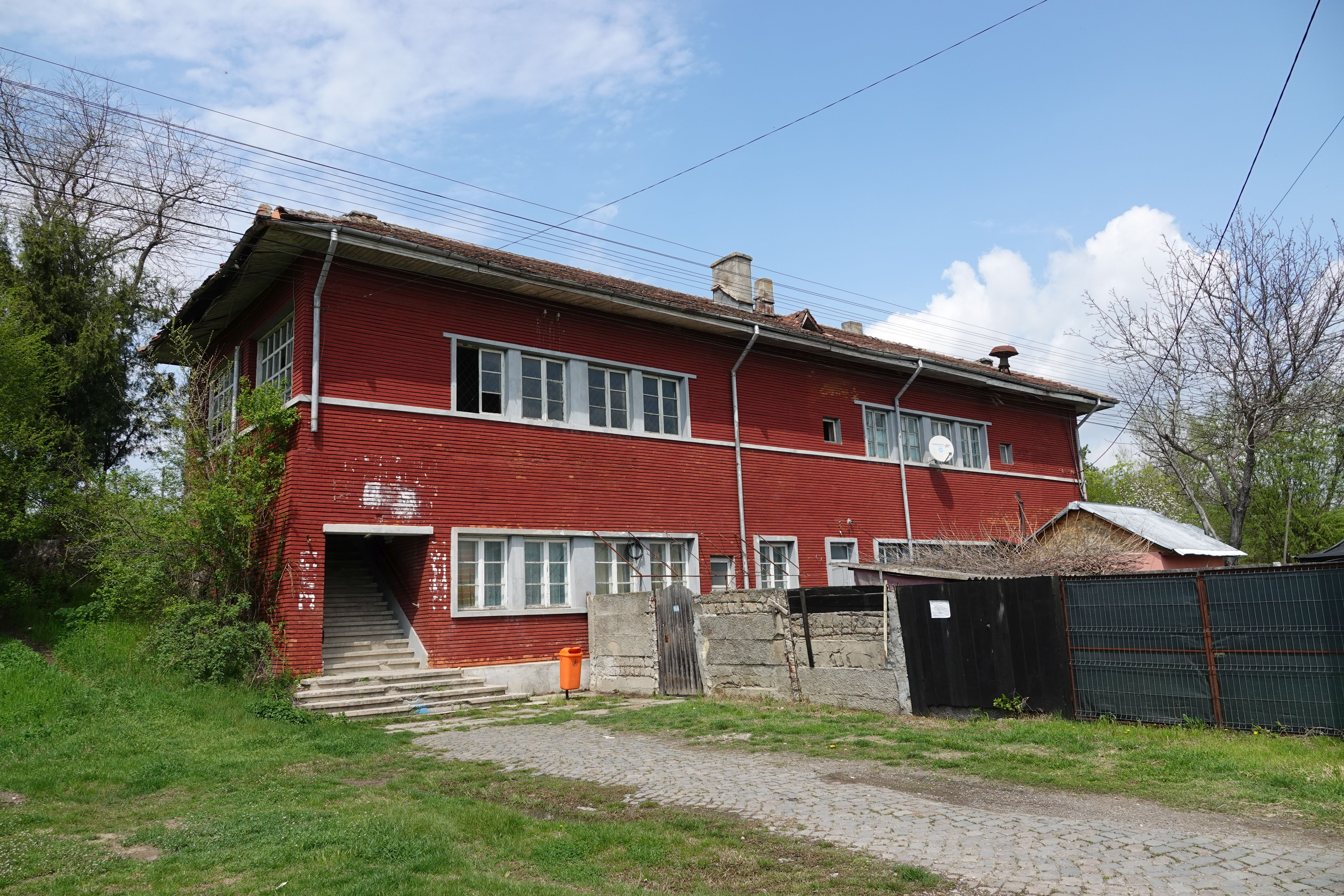
- Moldoveni train station

- Location in Ialomița County

- Location in Romania
- Coordinates: 44.714°N 26.517°E
- Country: Romania
- County: Ialomița

Government
  - Mayor (2024–2028): Victor Alexandru Dumitru (PSD)
- Area: 25.37 km^{2} (9.80 sq mi)
- Elevation: 56 m (184 ft)
- Population (2021-12-01): 1,143
  - Density: 45.05/km^{2} (116.7/sq mi)
- Time zone: UTC+02:00 (EET)
  - Summer (DST): UTC+03:00 (EEST)
- Postal code: 927107
- Area code: +(40) 243
- Vehicle reg.: IL
- Website: www.primariamoldoveni.ro

Moldoveni is a commune located in Ialomița County, Muntenia, Romania. It is composed of a single village, Moldoveni, part of Dridu Commune until 2005.

== History ==
In 1968, the Moldoveni commune administration was passed to Ilfov County, but was immediately abolished, Moldoveni village passing to Dridu commune. In 1981, a regional administrative reorganization led to the transfer of the commune of Dridu (with the village of Moldoveni) back to the county of Ialomița.

The Moldoveni commune was re-established in 2005, by law no. 67 of March 23, 2005, by separating the village of Moldoveni from the commune of Dridu.

Historical population
Year	Pop.	±%
1899	2,168	—
1925	2,894	+33.5%
2002	1,406	−51.4%
2011	1,247	−11.3%
2021	1,143	−8.3%
Source: Census data
