= Gavril Buciușcan =

Bessarabian politician (1889–1937)

Gavril Ivanovici Buciuşcan

Member of the Moldovan Parliament
- In office 1917–1918

Personal details
- Born: 8 April 1889 Isacova
- Died: 23 October 1937 (aged 48) Tiraspol
- Party: Communist Party of the Soviet Union; Socialist-Revolutionary Party

Gavril Ivanovici Buciuşcan (Russian: Гаврил Иванович Бучушкан, 8 April 1889 in Isacova – 23 October 1937 in Tiraspol) was a Bessarabian politician.

He served as Member of the Moldovan Parliament (1917–1918) and Commissar for Education of the Moldavian Autonomous Soviet Socialist Republic. Buciuşcan was killed on 23 October 1937 in Tiraspol, during the Great Purge.

== Works ==
- G. Buciuşcanu, Gramatica limbii moldoveneşti, Balta, 1925.

== Bibliography ==
- Gheorghe E. Cojocaru, Sfatul Țării: itinerar, Civitas, Chişinău, 1998, ISBN 9975-936-20-2
- Mihai Taşcă, Sfatul Țării şi actualele autorităţi locale, "Timpul de dimineaţă", no. 114 (849), June 27, 2008 (page 16)
