= Baurci-Moldoveni =

Baurci-Moldoveni Români
- Village
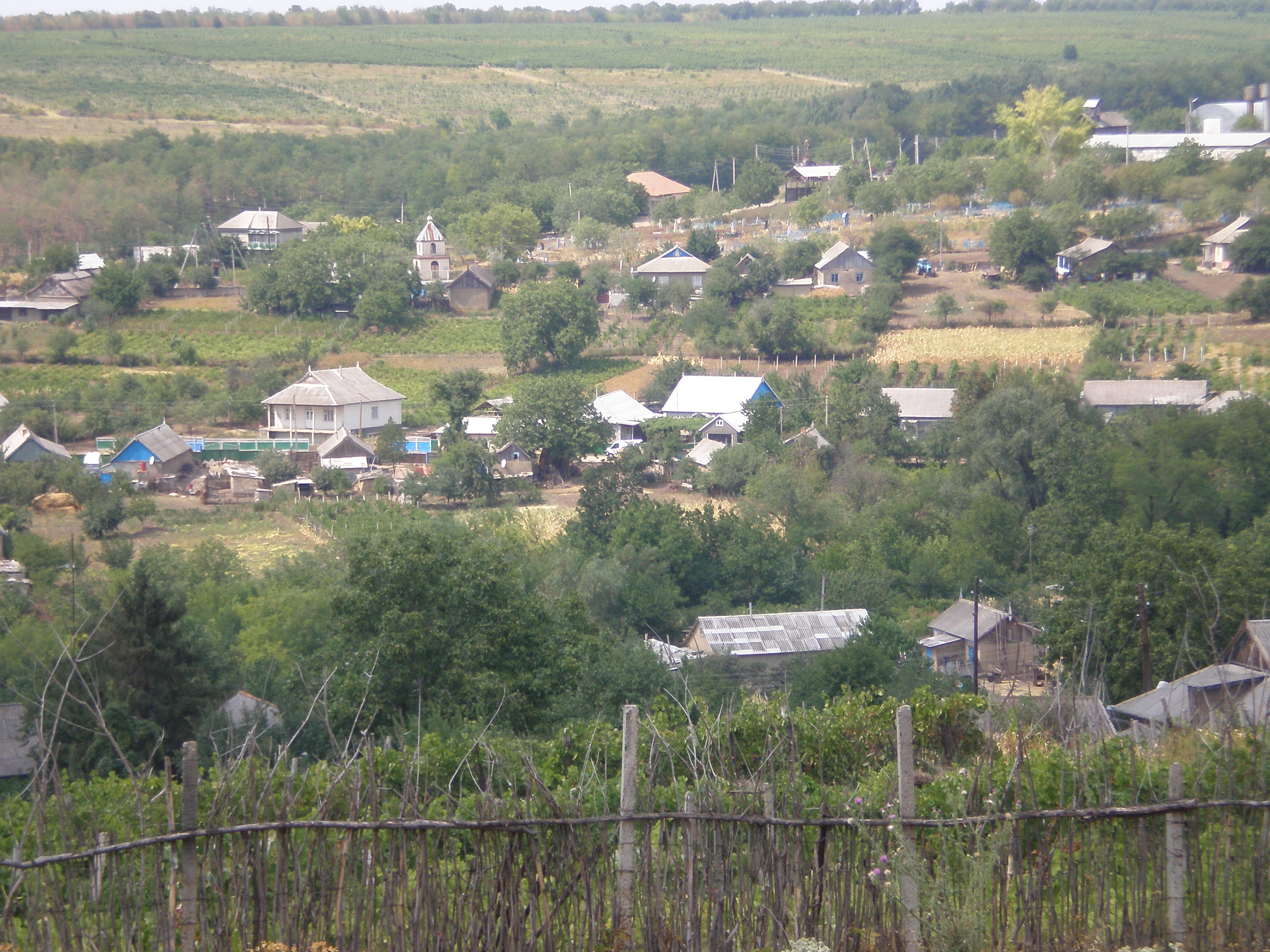

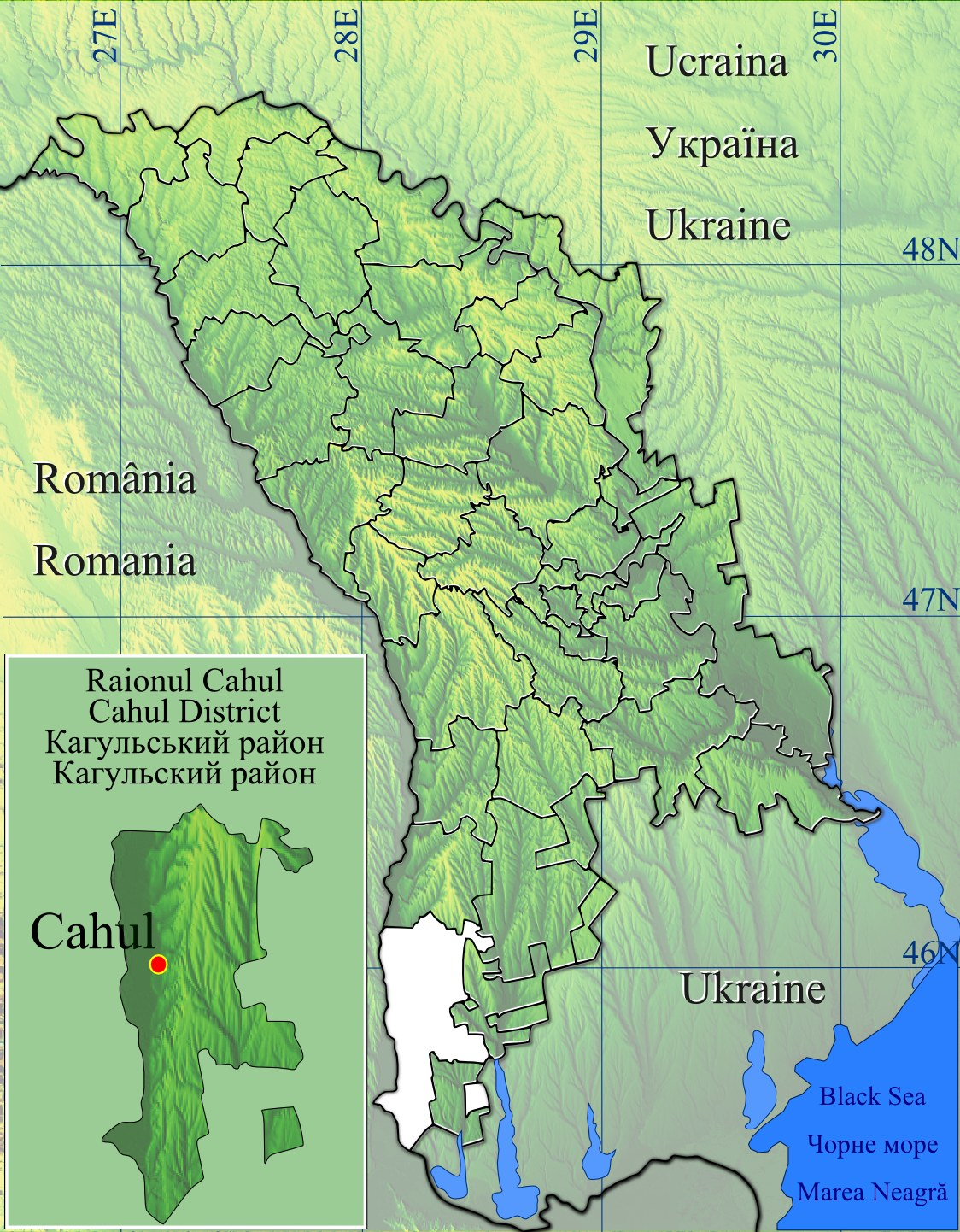
- Location within Cahul
- Coordinates: 46°1′57″N 28°13′52″E
- Country: Moldova
- District: Cahul District

Government
  - Mayor: Elena Enachi (PLDM)

Area
  - Total: 57 km^{2} (22 sq mi)

Population (2014 census)
  - Total: 2,052
- Time zone: UTC+2 (EET)
  - Summer (DST): UTC+3 (EEST)
- Postal code: MD-3914

Baurci-Moldoveni (formerly Români) is a village in Cahul District, Moldova.

== Natives ==
- Dmitrii Milev (1887–1937), writer and communist politician
