= Izmailsky Uyezd =

Subdivision of the Bessarabia Governorate of the Russian Empire

Izmailsky County (Russian: Измаильский уезд, romanized: Izmailsky Uyezd) was an uezd, one of the subdivisions of the Bessarabia Governorate of the Russian Empire. It was situated in the southern part of the governorate. Its administrative centre was Izmail.

== Demographics ==
At the time of the Russian Empire Census of 1897, Izmailsky Uyezd had a population of 244,274. Of these, 39.1% spoke Moldovan and Romanian, 19.6% Ukrainian, 12.5% Bulgarian, 12.4% Russian, 7.3% Gagauz or Turkish, 4.8% Yiddish, 2.0% German, 0.7% Greek, 0.5% Romani, 0.3% Albanian, 0.2% Polish, 0.2% Turkmen, 0.1% Belarusian, 0.1% Czech, 0.1% Tatar and 0.1% Armenian as their native language.

== See also ==
- Ismail County
- Cahul County
