= Moldova Suverană =

Moldova Suverenă
- Type: Daily newspaper
- Founded: 1 May 1924
- Language: Romanian
- Headquarters: Chișinău
- Circulation: 100,000 copies per day in 1994
- ISSN: 1857-1859
- OCLC number: 37355674
- Website: http://www.moldova-suverana.md/

Moldova Suverană (ISSN 1857-1859) is a Romanian language official newspaper of the Moldovan government which is published daily in Chișinău. It had a circulation of 100,000 copies per day in 1994.

It was founded in the Moldavian Autonomous Soviet Socialist Republic capital of Balta in 1924, under the name Plugarul Roșu («Плугарул рош», lit. Red Ploughman). In 1930, it moved to Tiraspol, and was renamed to the name it would have during the remainder of the Soviet period, Moldova Socialistă («Молдова сочиалистэ»). It was printed in Chișinău, in the Moldavian Soviet Socialist Republic, from 1940, with the exception of 1941 to 1944, when it was printed in Moscow. It was renamed Moldova Suverenă upon the country's independence.

It was awarded the Order of the Red Banner of Labour.
