= Patriarchal Cross of Romania =

The Patriarchal Cross of Romania (Romanian: Crucea Patriarhală) is the highest Romanian Orthodox ecclesiastical decoration, established in 1925 by Patriarch Miron Cristea.

== Recipients ==
- Ilie Ilașcu (1994)
- Andrei Ivanțoc (1994)
- Tudor Petrov-Popa (1994)
- Alexandru Leșco (1994)
- Petru Godiac (1994)
- Carlo Paolicelli (2004)
- Dumitru Oprea (2005)
- Constantin Bălăceanu-Stolnici
- Traian Băsescu (2007)
- Nicanor Lemne (2015)
- Radu Ciuceanu (2017)
- Ștefan Buchiu (2018)
- Simona Halep (2019)
- Dumitru Comanescu (2020)
- George Becali (2021)

== See also ==
- List of ecclesiastical decorations
