= Filimon Săteanu =

Moldovan poet (1907–1937)

Filimon Ivanovici Săteanu or Săteanul (Moldovan Cyrillic: Филимон Иванович Сэтяну; 1907 – late 1937) was a Moldovan poet and victim of the Great Purge. Though an ethnic Romanian from Bessarabia, he was active and published in the Soviet Union's Moldavian Autonomous Republic (MASSR). Known publicly as a committed communist, Săteanu allegedly supported the notion that Moldavians and Romanians are the same people, and was singled out as a Romanian nationalist. This resulted in his execution by the NKVD.

== Biography ==
Săteanu was born in 1907 in the village of Păpăuți on the Dniester's right bank, which was back then part of the Russian Empire's Bessarabia Governorate; as recounted by scholar Sergiu Grossu, his was an ethnic Romanian family. Also according to Grossu, this ethnic affiliation meant that Săteanu and Nistor Cabac were always mistreated by the MASSR, which distributed its accolades to non-Romanians—including Samuil Lehtțir, Dmitrii Milev, and Culai Neniu. Săteanu and Cabac's status as "Romanians who could not be included within Romania's natural borders" was noted in May 1936 by "Petronius", of the Bucharest newspaper Viitorul.

Săteanu's poems were collected in a single volume, the 1936 Ție, Patrie, îți cînt ("It is to Thee I Sing, My Country"). In 1931, Lehtțir's Octombrie magazine published his De peste Nistru ("From Over the Dniester"), one of several period poems which described the Greater Romania as highly oppressive, claiming that Moldavians from that region secretly cherished MASSR as an ideal homeland. As early as 1934, the scattered works drew attention from the exile anti-communist Nichita Smochină, who commented on one of Săteanu's idylls, which began in classical form (as a romantic address to a peasant girl), and ended with slogans about plentiful life in the kolkhoz and the Five-year Plan. Another piece focused on the life and times of poet Mihai Andricescu, whom the MASSR authorities had labeled a Romanian nationalist. Săteanu restored Andricescu's status as a Leninist poet:

Deci fii liniștit partizan și colhoznic,
De grija Moldovei nu fii tulburat,
Căci alți poeți tineri vor duce al tău lucru
Cu steagul lui Lenin, sub care-ai luptat.

Translation:

You mustn't be wary, thou soldier and farmer,
You mustn't be fearful of Moldavia's plight,
For other young poets will carry your banner,
The banner of Lenin, the flag of your fight.

Literary historians describe Săteanu's downfall and death as related to his belief that the MASSR was a Romanian polity. Maria Șleahtițchi, who cites an earlier verdict by Mihai Cimpoi, views Săteanu as directly involved in the Soviet Latinization campaign, which had been reversed, and which made him a political suspect by 1936. Likewise, Elena Tamazlâcaru includes Săteanu among the MASSR authors who were "lined up against the wall and shot for the serious 'crime' of speaking and writing in Romanian". Nicolae Dabija renders one of the charges in the original de-Romanianized vernacular: au îngunoioșat limba moldovenească cu cuvinte romînești ("[the writers] have besmirched the Moldavian language with their Romanian words"). Examples of terms used by Săteanu and the others included neologisms or words for which the MASSR preferred a Russianism: elev rather than școlar ("student"), timp rather than vreme ("time", "weather"), uzină rather than zavod ("factory"), and steag rather than flag (as in the English "flag").

Săteanu's verse was still included in the anthology Versurile tinereții ("Verses of Youth"), published in 1936 at Balta; the editorial team was semi-anonymous, with the editor-in-chief credited only as "Soloviova". The decision to shoot him was taken by the NKVD bureau in Tiraspol, on October 20, 1937, at the height of the Great Purge. He was executed at an unspecified date shortly after, part of a literary purge that also included Lehtțir (on October 10), Pavel Chioru (on October 11), Milev (on October 13), Cabac and Ion Corcin-Corcinschi (both on November 26); Teodor Malai was similarly shot as a Romanian nationalist, in October 1938.

== Legacy ==
The group of executed writers was tacitly rehabilitated over the next decades, when the MASSR was absorbed into the larger Moldavian Soviet Socialist Republic (comprising a majority of Soviet-occupied Bessarabia). As historian Iurie Colesnic indicates, discussing the writers' deaths was viewed as an embarrassment in Soviet historiography. For this reason, the 1974 Moldovan anthology, Cîntăreți ai primelor cincinale ("Poets of the First Five-year Plans"), falsified data on Săteanu, Cabac, and the others, making it seem like they had died during World War II; Săteanu's death was presented as having taken place in 1943. In June 1989, at the height of the Perestroika, the official paper Sovetskaya Moldavia hosted a historical review of Latinization and its quashing by Stalinism. Signed by scholars Anatol Moraru, Nicolae Movileanu, and Ion Șișcanu, it explicitly included Săteanu on a list of Purge-era killings.

Remembrance of Săteanu's life as a Romanian poet is cultivated in post-Soviet Moldova. In July 2022, he had his name inscribed on a votive cross in Chișinău, alongside Cabac, Chioru, Lehtțir, Milev, and 28 other writers, described therein as "massacred or deported by the diabolical communist-Stalinist regime." Moldavian identitarianism finds expression in the breakaway region of Transnistria, somewhat coterminous with the old MASSR; it also upholds Săteanu as a literary model. A collection put out in 2005 by the Shevchenko University of Tiraspol, titled Фечорий плаюлуй нистрян ("Sons of the Dniester Homeland"), was supposed to include him—but "regretfully, [his] works were not reprinted", and could not be located in the original anywhere in Transnistria.
