= Petru Godiac =

Petru Godiac OR
- Born: 1 October 1967 (age 59); Talmaza, Soviet Union
- Known for: fighter in the War of Transnistria
- Political party: Popular Front of Moldova
- Spouse: Iuliana Godiac (born Gălăţele)
- Children: Roxana-Cristina, Ionut-Petrică
- Awards: Order of the Republic

Petru Godiac (born 1 October 1967) is an activist from Moldova. He was decorated, by a presidential decree, with Moldova's highest state decoration – the Order of the Republic.

== Biography ==
Petru Godiac was born on 1 October 1967 in Talmaza, Ştefan Vodă District. He was a member of the Popular Front of Moldova in Tiraspol. Between April–June 1992, he fought in the War of Transnistria, but in June 1992 was captured. Petru Godiac and the other members of the "Tiraspol Six" were convicted on 9 December 1993 of "terrorist acts". Ilie Ilașcu, Alexandru Leșco, Tudor Petrov-Popa, Andrei Ivanțoc, Petru Godiac, and Valeriu Garbuz are known as the "Tiraspol Six". Petru Godiac was released on 12 June 1994. He has been living in Cluj-Napoca since 1995.

== Awards ==
- The Order of the Republic - Moldova's highest state decoration
- Honorary citizen Cluj-Napoca
