= Democratic Forum of the Romanians of Moldova =

- Formation: April 17, 2005; 21 years ago
- Type: Mass civic movement
- Headquarters: Chișinău
- Members: Writers' Union, Union of Journalists, Association of Historians
- Official language: Romanian
- President: Nicolae Dabija
- Key people: Mihai Cimpoi, Constantin Tănase, Ion Buga, Gheorghe Palade, Valeriu Saharneanu

The Democratic Forum of the Romanians of Moldova (Romanian: Forumul Democrat al Românilor din Moldova) is a civic movement, which brings together over 120 NGOs, several leading public organizations of Moldova and a whole number of academicians, writers, journalists. In 2006, the organization claimed 100,000 members.

== Overview ==
The Democratic Forum of the Romanians of Moldova was created on April 17, 2005. But the Ministry of Justice officially recognized the forum only on October 26, 2005, after the intervention of the United States Department of State.

Several leading public organizations of Moldova (Moldovan Writers' Union, Union of Journalists of Moldova, Association of Historians of Moldova, Union of Cinematographers of Moldova, Union of Artists of Moldova, Jewish Cultural Society, and some other) and a whole number of academicians, writers, journalists have founded the civil movement named Democratic Forum of the Romanians of Moldova.

The writer Nicolae Dabija is president of the Democratic Forum of the Romanians of Moldova.

== Leadership ==
Board of Directors and wise counsel of the Democratic Forum of the Romanians of Moldova:

- Nicolae Dabija, writer, editor in chief Literatura şi Arta, honorary member of the Romanian Academy (president);
- Andrei Vartic, the first Vice-President;
- Acad Mihai Cimpoi, president of the Moldovan Writers' Union;
- Constantin Tănase, director Timpul de dimineaţă (vice president);
- Ion Buga, PhD in History, professor (secretary general);
- Gheorghe Palade, Ph.D. in History, Association of Historians of Moldova;
- Valeriu Saharneanu, president of the Union of Journalists of Moldova;
- Valeriu Dulgheru, Head of Department, Technical University of Moldova, Doctor of Technical Sciences (vice president);
- Anatol Vidraşcu, editor;
- Valerian Dorogan, vice-rector of the Technical University of Moldova;
- Nina Josu, President of the Association for Romanian Literature and Culture "Astra" - "Onisifor Ghibu";
- Alecu Reniță, president of Ecological Movement of Moldova;
- Petru Munteanu, lawyer;
- protoiereu Ioan Ciuntu, Chairman of the Culture Commission of the Metropolis of Bessarabia;
- Mihai Patraș, PhD in economics;
- Gheoghe Maxian, Professor (Orhei);
- Mihai Morăraş, President of Subsidiary Forum from Moldova State University;
- Acad Sergiu Chircă;
- Ion Dicusară, Doctor of Technical Sciences;
- Ion Melniciuc, doctor of philology, Head of Department, Moldova State University
- Ion Ungureanu, former Minister of Culture;
- Ion Costaş, former Minister of Defense;
- Academician Alexandru Moşanu;
- Acad Petru Soltan;
- Boris Druţă, lawyer;
- Aurelian Silvestru, doctor of pedagogy, the school director "Prometeu";
- Academician Anatol Codru;
- Acad Ion Mahu, president of the Romanian Army Veterans Association;
- Timotei Melnic, president of the League of Teachers;
- Aneta Grosu, editor in chief of Ziarul de Gardă;
- Boris Movilă, journalist
- Acad Gheorghe Ghidirim;
- Acad Anatol Ciobanu;
- Acad Diomid Gherman;
- Alexei Mărulea businessman;
- Sergiu Nucă, journalist;
- Tudor Negru, Doctor of Law:
- Vasile Tărâțeanu, president of the Romanian communities in Ukraine;
- Petru Grozavu, president of Association "Dunărea şi Marea" (Southern Bessarabia);
- Ilie Ilaşcu, a former political prisoner;
- Andrei Ivanțoc, former political prisoner;
- Tudor Petrov-Popa, former political prisoner;
- Alexandru Leşco, a former political prisoner
