= Nina Josu =

Moldovan writer and activist

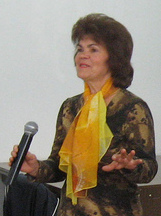
- Born: February 17, 1953 (age 73); Țiganca, Cahul District
- Education: Maxim Gorky Literature Institute

Nina Josu (born February 17, 1953, in Țiganca) is a writer and activist from Moldova. She is the head of the Association for Romanian Literature and Culture "ASTRA" - "Onisifor Ghibu".

== Biography ==
Nina Josu graduated from Maxim Gorky Literature Institute in 1976. She is a member of the Moldovan Writers' Union. Nina Josu works for Literatura și Arta.

Nina Josu is president of the Association for Romanian Literature and Culture "ASTRA" - "Onisifor Ghibu" (Romanian: Asociaţia pentru Literatura şi Cultura Română „Astra" – "O.Ghibu), Chişinău (reactivated on November 17, 1994). She is a leader of Democratic Forum of Romanians in Moldova.

== Works ==
- La sezători, 1975, preface by P. Boțu,
- Trecere în alb, 1980;
- Stare totală, 1986;
- Dorul, 1991
