= Vrănești =

Vrăneşti may refer to several places in Moldova:

- Vrăneşti, a village in Taxobeni Commune, Făleşti district
- Vrăneşti, a village administered by Sîngerei city, Sîngerei district

and to:

- Vrăneşti, a village in Călineşti Commune, Argeș County, Romania
