= Vancicăuți =

Vancicăuți may refer to:

- Vancicăuți, Edineț, a village in Cepeleuți Commune, Edineț District, Moldova
- Vancicăuții Mari, the Romanian name for Vanchikivtsi Commune, Novoselytsia Raion, Ukraine
- Vancicăuții Mici, the Romanian name for Novoivankivtsi village, Kostychany Commune, Novoselytsia Raion, Ukraine
