= Radu Ciuceanu =

Romanian historian and politician (1928–2022)

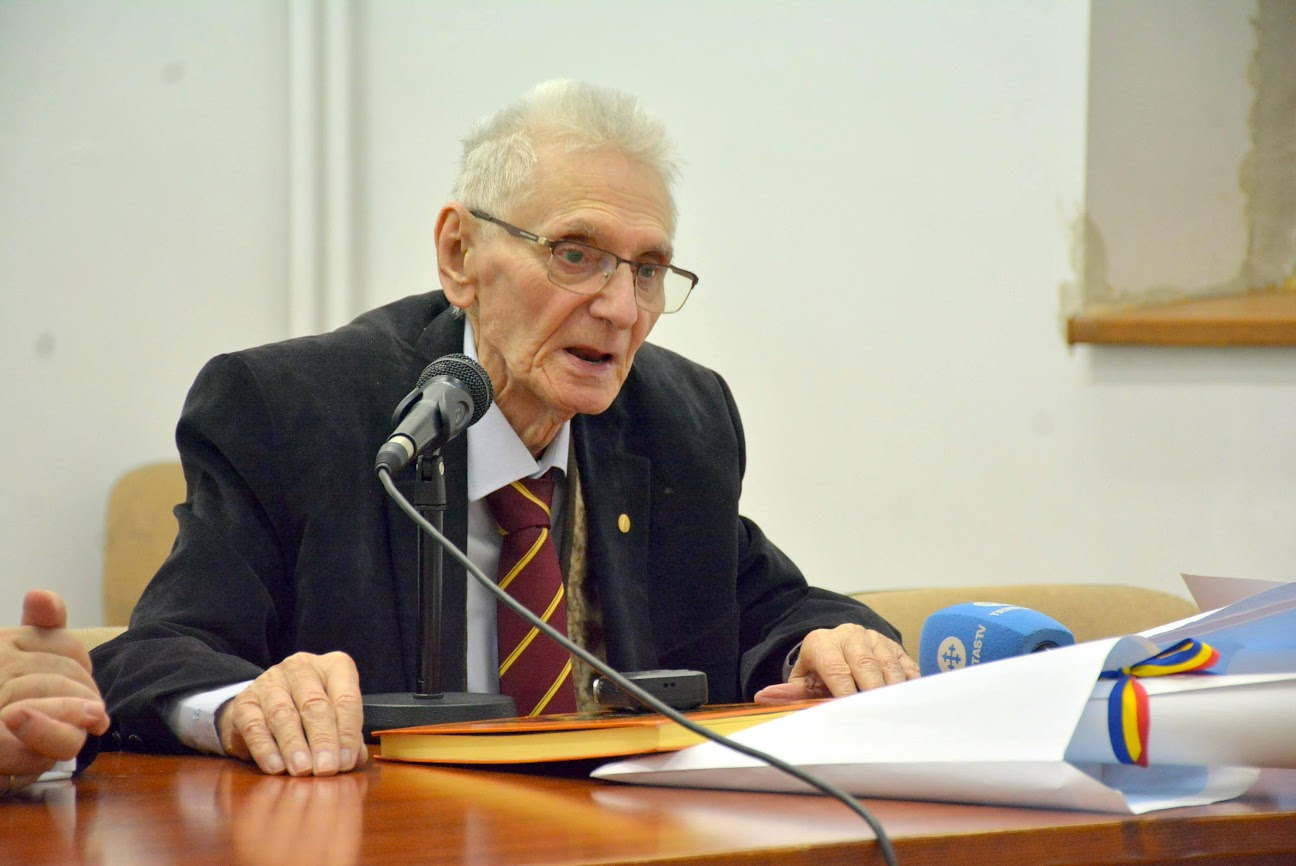
- Radu Ciuceanu in 2020

Member of the Chamber of Deputies of Romania
- In office 2000–2004
- In office 1990–1992

Personal details
- Born: 16 April 1928 Arad, Kingdom of Romania
- Died: 12 September 2022 (aged 94) Bucharest, Romania
- Resting place: Bellu Cemetery, Bucharest
- Party: PCNU; PNL; PRM
- Education: Carol I National College
- Alma mater: University of Bucharest
- Occupation: Historian
- Known for: Founder of the National Institute for the Study of Totalitarianism
- Awards: National Order of Faithful Service, Knight rank Patriarchal Cross of Romania

Radu Ciuceanu (16 April 1928 – 12 September 2022) was a Romanian historian and politician. A member of the National Liberal Party and later the Greater Romania Party, he served in the Chamber of Deputies from 1990 to 1992 and again from 2000 to 2004.

He was born in Arad. In 1947, while a student at the Carol I High School in Craiova, he joined the anti-communist resistance group led by general Ioan Carlaonț. Ciuceanu completed high school next year and enrolled in the Faculty of Medicine, but he was arrested in September 1948 by the communist authorities. He was interrogated by the Securitate and the NKVD, and sentenced to 15 years of imprisonment with hard labor for having laid the foundations of "a subversive organization with a terrorist character" and for "purchasing weapons, ammunition and explosives, with the aim of removing the regime and to fight against the Soviet Union, through actions of sabotage and insurrection." Ciuceanu was detained at penitentiaries in Craiova, Jilava, Târgșor, Pitești, Gherla, Aiud, Văcărești, and Dej, as well as at the Poarta Albă forced-labor camp on the Danube–Black Sea Canal. While at Pitești Prison, starting in 1949, he was tortured (by, among others, Eugen Țurcanu), as part of the notorious re-education experiment supervised by the Securitate general Alexandru Nicolschi. Ciuceanu was also subjected to torture at Gherla Prison in 1951. He was freed on 18 September 1963, but remained under Securitate monitoring until 1989. He was not issued an identity card or a work permit until 1965.

From 1968 he studied at the Faculty of History of the University of Bucharest, graduating in 1972. In 1975 he worked as an archaeologist at the Institute of Archeology, but was fired after a month due to his status as ex-political detainee. Later that year he started working as an archaeologist at the National Museum of History and Archeology in Bucharest, a position he held until February 1990. During this period he did archaeological excavations at Putna Monastery, Coșula, Mihăilești, Afumați, Ghica-Tei Church, Pantelimon, Văcărești, and Colțea Church. In December 1989 he participated in the Romanian Revolution, defending the TVR Tower.

Ciuceanu was a National Liberal Party (PNL) deputy from Alba County and vice-president of the Chamber of Deputies in the 1990–1992 legislature. During that time, he was part of the committee of parliamentarians and constitutional law experts that drafted the 1991 Constitution of Romania. In 1990 he was one of the founders of the Association of Former Political Detainees from Romania. In 1993 Ciuceanu founded the National Institute for the Study of Totalitarianism (under the aegis of the Romanian Academy), which he led as director for 3 decades. In 2010, the Bucharest Tribunal awarded him 600,000 Euros in damages for the torture he endured in communist prisons.

Ciuceanu was awarded the National Order of Faithful Service, Knight rank. In 2017, he received the highest award of the Romanian Patriarchate, the Patriarchal Cross of Romania. He was elected honorary member of the Romanian Academy on 27 September 2019.

He died in Bucharest on 12 September 2022, at the age of 94, and was buried in the city's Bellu Cemetery.
