= Victor Teleucă =

Moldovan writer (1933-2002)

Victor Teleucă OR
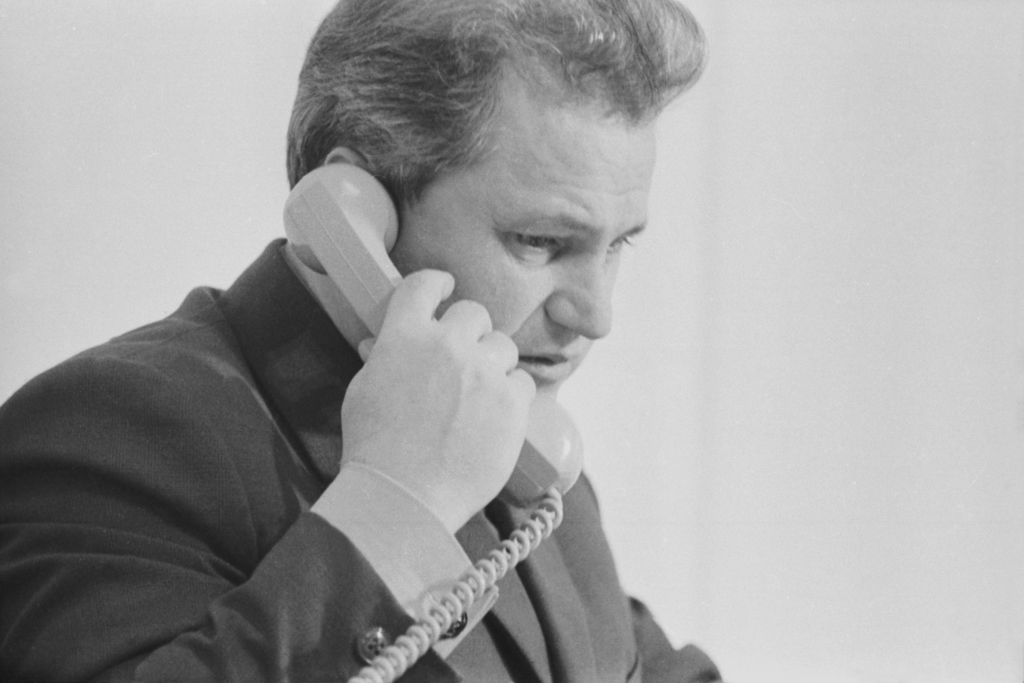
- Teleucă in 1972
- Born: January 19, 1933; Cepeleuți, Kingdom of Romania
- Died: August 12, 2002 (aged 69); Chișinău, Moldova
- Education: Ion Creangă Pedagogical State University
- Known for: Literatura și Arta
- Spouse: Lidia Tomuz
- Children: Eugen, Ion, Mariana, Rodica
- Parent(s): Gavril and Maria Teleucă

Victor Teleucă (19 January 1933 – 12 August 2002) was a Moldovan writer and poet from Bessarabia (now Republic of Moldova). He was the first editor in chief of Literatura și Arta (1977–1983).

== Works ==
- Momentul inimii, Chișinău, "Cartea Moldovei", 1975
- Încercarea de a nu muri, Chișinău, "Literatura artistică", 1980
- Întoarcerea dramaticului eu, Chișinău, "Literatura artistică", 1983
- Piramida Singurătății, Chișinău, "Cartea Moldovei", 2000
- Ninge la o margine de existență, Chișinău, "Cartea Moldovei", 2002
- Decebal, Chișinău, "Universul", 2002
- Momentul inimii, Chișinău, Litera, 2003
- Improvizația nisipului, Chișinău, "Universul", 2006

== Bibliography ==
Theodor Codreanu, Transmodernismul, Iași, "Junimea", 2005, pag. 245–257.
