= Tudor Negru =

Moldovan politician (born 1937)

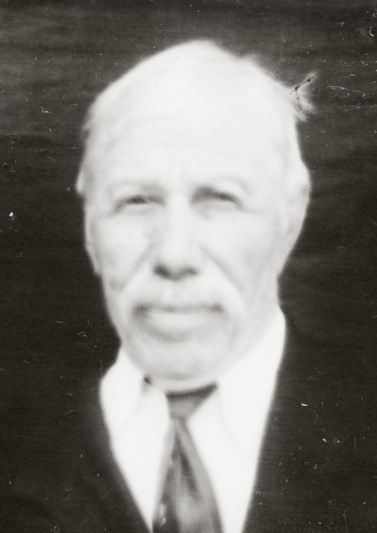

Member of the Moldovan Parliament
- In office 1990–1994

Personal details
- Party: Popular Front of Moldova

Tudor Negru (born 1937) is a Moldovan politician.

He served as member of the Parliament of Moldova and is a leader of the Democratic Forum of Romanians in Moldova.
