= Ion Ciuntu =

Moldovan politician (born 1954)

Ion Ciuntu OR
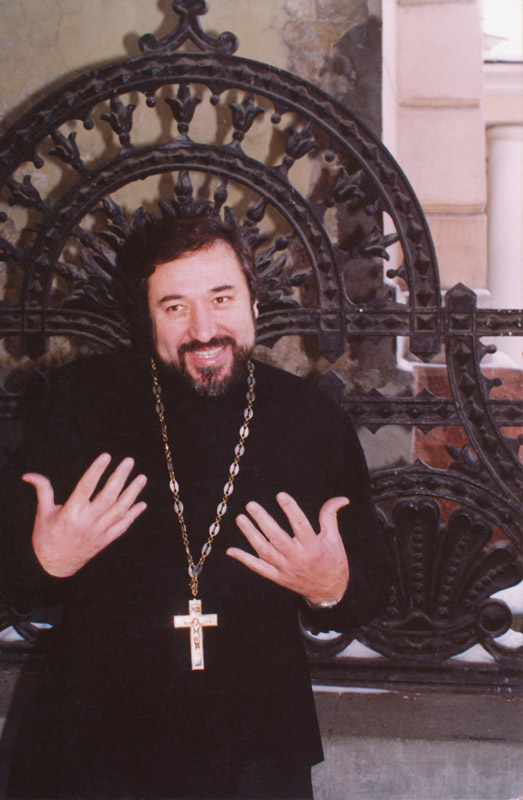
- Ciuntu in the 1990s

Member of the Moldovan Parliament
- In office 17 April 1990 – 29 March 1994
- Parliamentary group: Popular Front
- Constituency: Hîncești

Personal details
- Born: 5 December 1954 (age 71) Păulești, Moldavian SSR, Soviet Union
- Party: Popular Front of Moldova

Ion Ciuntu (born 5 December 1954) is a Moldovan priest and former politician.

== Biography ==
He served as member of the Parliament of Moldova and is a leader of the Democratic Forum of Romanians in Moldova.

== See also ==
- Metropolis of Bessarabia
