= Berezlogi =

- Commune
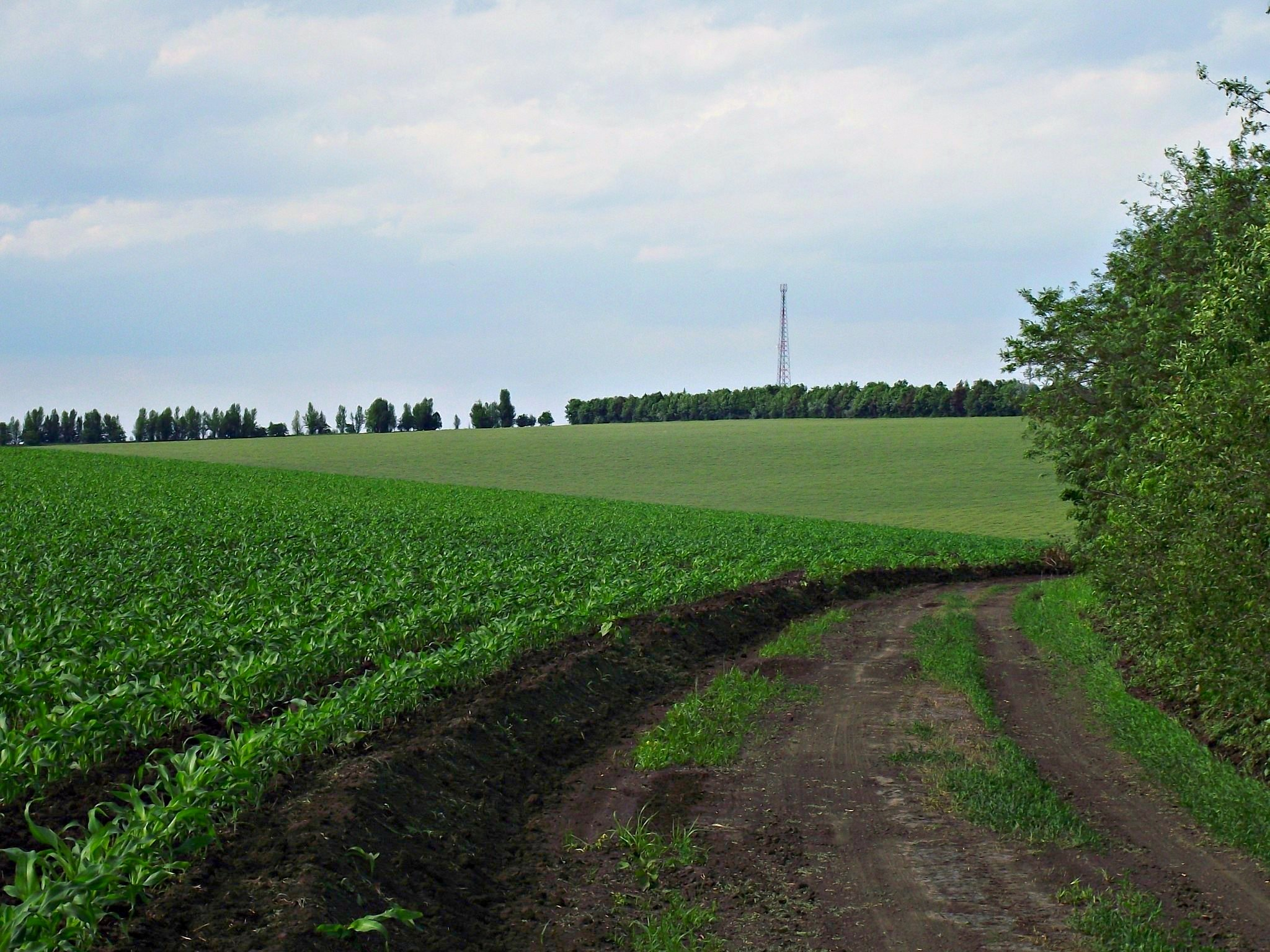

- Location in Moldova
- Coordinates: 47°26′N 28°56′E
- Country: Moldova
- District: Orhei District

Population (2014)
  - Total: 1,800
- Time zone: UTC+2 (EET)
  - Summer (DST): UTC+3 (EEST)

Berezlogi is a commune in Orhei District, Moldova. It is composed of two villages, Berezlogi and Hîjdieni.

== Notable people ==
- Boris Movilă (born 1928), writer
