= Boris Movilă =

Moldovan writer (1928–2016)

- Born: 6 October 1928; Hîjdieni, Berezlogi, Orhei District, Moldova
- Died: 29 September 2016 (aged 87); Chişinău, Moldova
- Education: Moldova State University
- Occupation: Writer

Boris Movilă (6 October 1928 – 29 September 2016) was a Moldovan writer.

== Life and career ==
Movilă was born in Hîjdieni (Berezlogi, Orhei District). He was the deputy president of the Comitetul pentru Cinematografie and redactor-in-chief of Moldova-Film. Movilă was a leader of the Democratic Forum of Romanians in Moldova. He died on 29 September 2016, at the age of 87.
