= Anatol Ciobanu =

Moldovan writer, activist and academic (1934–2016)

Anatol Ciobanu OR
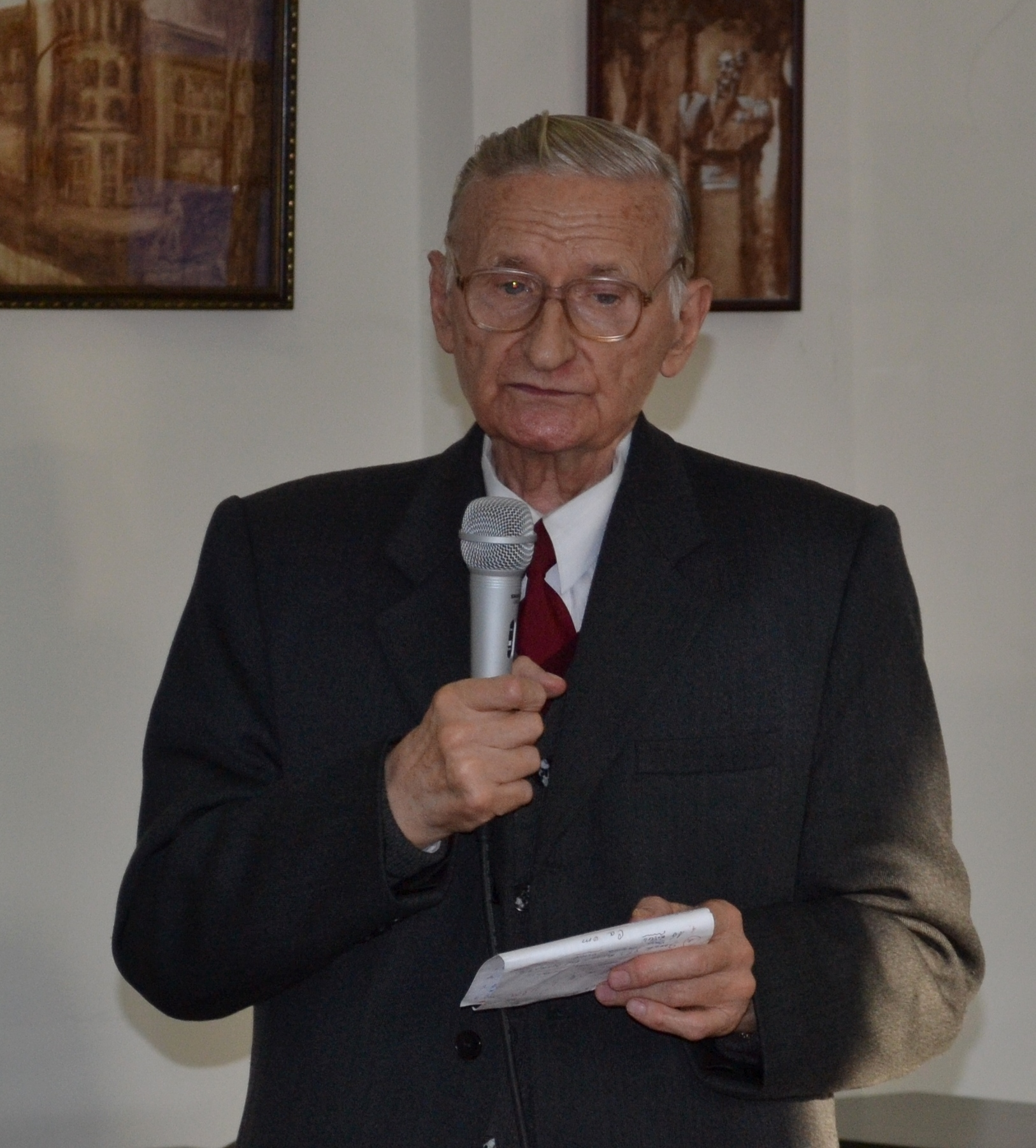
- Ciobanu in 2010
- Born: May 14, 1934; Ruseni, Kingdom of Romania
- Died: April 8, 2016 (aged 81); Chișinău, Moldova
- Education: Moldova State University
- Occupation: Professor
- Employer: Moldova State University
- Awards: Order of the Republic (Moldova)

Anatol Ciobanu (14 May 1934 – 8 April 2016) was a Moldovan professor and researcher. He was head of the Department of Romanian language at Moldova State University, a corresponding member of the Academy of Sciences of Moldova, and a leader of the Democratic Forum of Romanians in Moldova.

== Biography ==
Anatol Ciobanu was born on May 14, 1934, in Ruseni. He graduated from Moldova State University in 1956 and since 1959 he has been working for this university. Anatol Ciobanu got his PhD in 1973. Since 2001, he has been the head of the Department of Romanian language, general linguistics and Romance of the Moldova State University in Chişinău. In 1992, Anatol Ciobanu became a corresponding member of the Academy of Sciences of Moldova.

== Awards ==
- Order of the Republic (Moldova)
- Doctor Honoris Cauza Alecu Russo State University of Bălți
- Lucrător Emerit al Şcolii Superioare din R.S.S.M. şi din U.R.S.S.,
- Diploma de laureat pentru realizări în cercetare
- Diploma de Onoare a Universităţii de Stat din Moldova,
- Diploma de Excelenţă a Ambasadei României.
- Medalia „M. Eminescu”,
- Medalia „D. Cantemir”,
- Medalia „50 de ani ai USM”

== Works ==
- Părţile principale ale propoziţiei (1969);
- Probleme dificile de gramatică (1969);
- Să scriem şi să vorbim corect (1970);
- Синтаксис полусвязочных глаголов (în 2 vol., 1976, 1978);
- Sintaxa propoziţiei (1976); Sintaxa frazei (1984);
- Sintaxa şi semantica (Studiu de lingvistică generală) (1987);
- Sintaxa (1987, în colab. şi red.);
- Limba maternă şi cultivarea ei (1988);
- Sintaxa practică (Cu elemente de analiză transformaţională) (1991);
- Limba latină: Manual pentru cl. a X-a (1995, în colab.);
- Lingua latina (1996, în colab.);
- Limba latină: Manual pentru cl. a XI-a (1999, în colab.);
- Punctuaţia limbii române (2000);
- Mic dicţionar latin-român de expresii consacrate (2002, în colab.);
- Limba latină: Manual pentru cl. a XII-a (2005, în colab.);
- Antologie filologică (2005, alc. şi coautor).
