= Nichita Smochină =

Transnistrian Romanian activist, scholar, and politician (1894–1980)

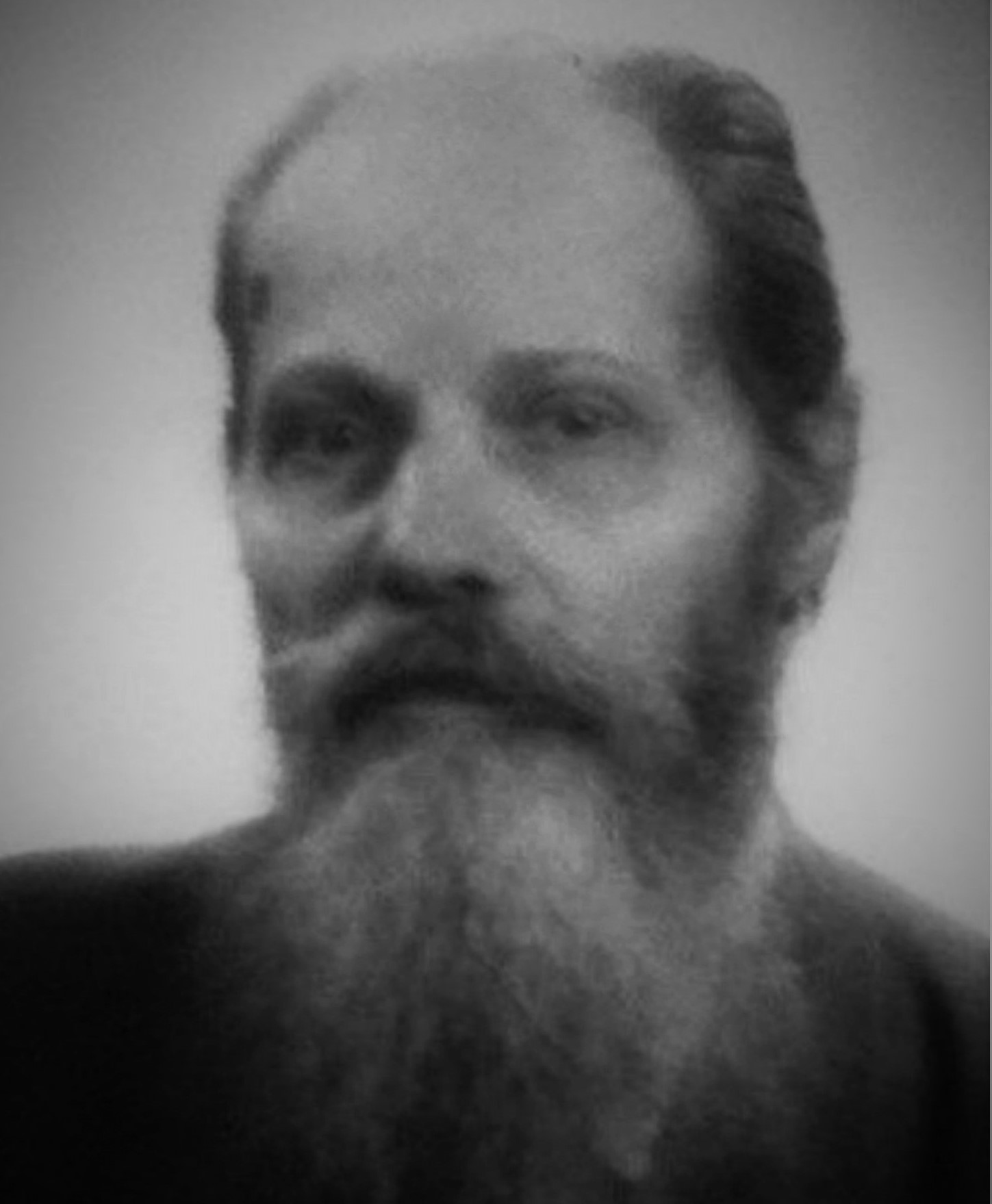
- Smochină in 1964
- Born: March 14, 1894; Mahala, Kherson Governorate, Russian Empire
- Died: December 14, 1980 (aged 86); Bucharest, Socialist Republic of Romania
- Other names: Nikita Smokine; Mihai Florin

Academic background
- Influences: Pan Halippa, Nicolae Iorga

President of the National Moldavian Council
- In office December 15, 1941 – 1944

Member of the Central Council of Ukraine
- In office Early 1918 – April 1918
- Constituency: Tyraspil County

Academic work
- Main interests: Ethnography, folkloristics, historiography, jurisprudence, popular history, Slavic studies

Nichita Smochină (Romanian pronunciation: [niˈkita smoˈkinə]; Moldovan Cyrillic: Никита Смокинэ, Russian: Никита Парфеньевич Смокина, Nikita Parfenievich Smokina; also known as Mihai Florin; 14 March 1894 – 14 December 1980) was an ethnic Romanian activist, scholar, and political figure from what is now Transnistria. He is especially noted for campaigning on behalf of Romanians in the Soviet Union. He was first active in the Russian Empire, serving with distinction in World War I. He turned to Romanian nationalism in 1917 when he was serving as an officer in Russian Transcaucasia. Smochină met Bolshevik leader Vladimir Lenin, recording Lenin's then-tolerant views on Romanian emancipation. Smochină was then active in the Ukrainian People's Republic, where he led the general caucus formed by Romanians in Tiraspol. He was also part of the Central Council, and earned his reputation as a champion of Transnistrian Romanian interests.

An anti-communist, Smochină narrowly escaped the Bolsheviks. In late 1919, together with his surviving family, he crossed into Greater Romania, making it their second home. As a protégé of historian Nicolae Iorga, he earned his academic credentials and made himself internationally known as an expert on minority rights. At the start of the 1920s, he contributed to historical research, ethnography and folkloristics, as well as jurisprudence. He became noted as an expert on Transnistria, which, under Soviet Ukrainian rule, formed a "Moldavian ASSR". His books covered the region's Russification and the introduction of irreligion, being singled out as a dangerous element by official representatives of the Soviet Union. Smochină's interwar activism also extended into humanitarian efforts, including the welcoming of refugees in Romania fleeing the Great Ukrainian Famine. His scientific work included a recovery of pre-Bolshevik or anti-Russian Romanian folklore in Transnistria and beyond.

During most of World War II, Smochină initially backed the authoritarian regime of Ion Antonescu and paid service to Gheorghe Alexianu's Transnistria Governorate. He later criticized the antisemitic surge, as embodied in the Odessa massacre. By 1942, he had become noted for his involvement in a conflict with Alexianu and Ștefan Bulat, but found renewed backing from the Antonescu government. He eventually left the region, alongside 10,000 Romanian refugees, during the Soviet counter-offensive of 1944. His activities as a folklorist, along with his exposure of Soviet brutality, made him a wanted man once the communist regime took over Romania. This meant Smochină had to live under assumed names until the mid 1950s. He was eventually captured, sent to prison, and stripped of his academic honors. Partly reinstated during national communism in the late 1960s, he spent his final decades encouraging the second-generation communist authorities to take a firmer stance against controversial Soviet policies such as "Moldovenism".

== Biography ==
=== Origins and early life ===
Nichita Smochină was born on the confines of historical Moldavia and Bessarabia. The entire area between the Dniester and the Southern Bug ("Transnistria" in the largest definition) was at the time part of the Russian Kherson Governorate. As he later recounted, the bountiful eastern bank of the Dniester was home to a thriving Romanian community; or, as he put it, a veritable "Romanian California". His later research traced the first Romanian presence in that area to the Dark Ages, and revived by the Cossack Hetmanate's border policy, particularly in the 1650s. According to him, there were two main stages in the migration and resettlement of Moldavian peasants to what became his homeland. The first was under Moldavian Prince George Ducas (late 17th century), and the second under Russian Empress Catherine the Great. Smochină spoke in detail about the Romanian colonies of 18th-century "New Russia", that reached as far east as Oleksandriia.

The Smochinăs were descendants of Romanian yeomen (răzeși), originally from Moldavia, and reportedly spoke an archaic variant of the Romanian language. The literary historian Al. Husar, who met Smochină in the 1940s, recalled that his use of the eastern dialect had the "scent of ages" and "seemed to be a wonder of the Romanian language." Smochină's place of birth was Mahala village, on the eastern, non-Bessarabian, shore of the Dniester. His father, Parfeni, was the village Starosta for about 20 years. Nichita's mother, Ana Mircea, used the term "Romanian" to mean "male person". The couple had another four children.

Primarily known to his family as "Vlaicu", Smochină learned Russian at the Orthodox Church school in Mahala, where he was colleagues with the future activists Arhip Ciurea and Mircea Carp. He then completed his secondary education in Dubăsari (Dubossary), earning a gold medal for his academic excellence. Afterwards, Smochină went to a Russian Cadet school in Minsk, and, reportedly, worked as a clerk for Dubăsari Tribunal. He was interested in philology and later became one of the few Romanian experts in the study of Old Church Slavonic. When World War I erupted, he was serving in the Imperial Russian Army, and fought throughout the Caucasus campaign. His services were rewarded with the Order of St. George, and thus he joined the ranks of Russian nobility. He was by then married to Agafia (or Agaphia), who gave birth to their first son, Alexandru Nichita on June 28, 1915 in Mahala.

Despite receiving Russian accolades, Smochină was becoming increasingly hostile to Tsarist autocracy and building up "unrestrained hatred" for Russian soldiers who mistreated their "Moldavian" comrades. The February Revolution caught him behind the lines in Tiflis Governorate. He was appointed military delegate by a Congress of non-Russian Peoples, organized under the Special Transcaucasian Committee in Tbilisi (May 1917), where he demanded Romanian-language education for the Moldavian diaspora. The Congress sent him over to Petrograd for negotiations with the Soviet of Workers' and Soldiers' Deputies (summer 1917). As he later noted, he happened to hear a speech given by Vladimir Lenin, leader of the ultra-revolutionary Bolshevik faction, who was working to topple the Russian Provisional Government. Smochină was intrigued by Lenin's promise of self-determination for all of Russia's minorities: "As a Moldavian, I found this issue to be one of greatest interest". Smochină was interested in finding out Lenin's level of commitment in this respect, and was invited for an interview (as he recalled, this was only made possible because one of Lenin's bodyguards was originally from Mahala).

According to Smochină's own rendition of the encounter, when asked about his vision on the Moldavian question, Lenin began by stating: "You Moldavians have no interest in fighting on the side of Russia, who for centuries now has been enslaving your kind. Culturally, Moldavians are far more advanced than Russians." Lenin stated that what must be done was for Moldavians to take up arms and fight against the two "oppressors": Russia and "landowners' Romania". According to Smochină, Lenin openly agreed that Moldavians, Bessarabians, and Romanians were in essence the same demonym: "Take inspiration from your Romanian blood brothers, but, again, beware of falling into the claws of Romanian boyar exploiters. [...] all Moldavians are Romanians". The Bolshevik theorist appears to have incited the Transnistrians and Bessarabians to spread the flame of revolution into "boyar Romania", to "drown the hell out of the Romanian king and set up a Soviet Romania". Reportedly, Lenin also urged the Transnistrian delegate to personally sabotage the war effort on the Caucasus Front, fraternize with the Ottomans, and demand "peace without annexations or indemnities". As some Romanian historians have noted, "Lenin was not about to curb [a nation's independence], but did not specify in sufficiently clear terms what would happen if they should want to achieve self-determination in any social order other than communism."

=== Ukrainian deputy and Romanian refugee ===
Smochină returned to his place of origin, which was being progressively included in the newly emancipated Ukrainian People's Republic (UNR), and began defending the interests of local Romanians. As head of the Mahala Zemstvo, he tried to prevent the breakdown of social and military order, and narrowly escaped with his life after being pursued by the Bolshevik committees. In December 1917, after a pro-Romanian Moldavian Democratic Republic had taken root in Bessarabia, he and Gheorghe Mare were involved with the separatist Congress of Transnistrian Moldavians in Tiraspol, where they flew the Romanian tricolor. Smochină stated: "We love our country so much that even our icons look to Romania." By 1918, he had become Prefect of Tiraspol, then envoy for Tyraspil County to the Central Council of Kiev, capital of the new Ukrainian People's Republic. During this period, Smochină became noted for his efforts to prevent Bessarabia from being absorbed into the UNR, openly criticizing Volodymyr Vynnychenko's government for expressing such annexionist wishes.

Just west of the Dniester, the union of Bessarabia with Romania was effected in late 1918. Transnistria itself was caught up in the Ukrainian–Soviet War and was taken by the Bolshevik Ukrainian Soviet Socialist Republic, forming the "Moldavian Autonomous Oblast". Smochină's experience of Bolshevik rule was painful, and he described war communism as a trauma: "Entire properties were taken away, [Romanians in Transnistria] were left naked, downtrodden, worse off than during slavery". Just as he was preparing to emigrate, he saw Moldavian peasants raiding his estate. He finally escaped Soviet Ukraine on December 25, 1919, and crossed the Dniester into Greater Romania, settling in the former Moldavian capital of Iași. Historian Oleg Galushchenko notes that he was only successful on his second attempt, since for unknown reasons, the Romanian border guards initially had him deported back to the Ukrainian shore. Smochină "miraculously survived".

According to Smochină, he had been sentenced to death by the Ukrainian communist government, and his relatives were exposed to violent Bolshevik reprisals. His father and his female cousin were shot, and almost all other Smochinăs were deported to Siberia. Smochină also reports that his eldest brother was drowned after managing to escape internment at Solovki, while his mother, detained in a tank half-filled with cold water, suffered from the fatal injuries. His wife Agafia escaped with him, but Alexandru was left behind. He joined them in 1922, when a courier commissioned by the father took him over to Iași. In Romania, the couple had another daughter, baptized as Claudia, as well as a son, known in sources as either Constantin or Nicolae. His 1980 obituary mentions another daughter, Antoaneta.

While in Iași, Smochină met with jurist Ioan Teodorescu, who helped him enroll at the Iași University Department of Philosophy and Law. He graduated in 1924 having by then also studied Psychology with Constantin Fedeleș. Smochină joined other Transnistrian refugee students during his college term and militated for increased awareness of their situation. However, he was also a critic of all Romanians arriving from Russia, noting that the Russian education system left them poorly trained and superficial. He first began associating with a circle of Bessarabian Romanians, and became friends with Bessarabian Peasants' Party founder Pan Halippa, heralding humanitarian projects to feed and integrate refugee children. This phase coincided with Soviet Transnistria's elevation in administrative status—that is, the establishment of a Moldavian ASSR on Oblast territory, in the newly proclaimed Soviet Union. Although refugees were convinced that the Soviet Union was a "prison of the peoples", Smochină and some of his colleagues gave positive review to the move, seeing it as an implicit recognition of Moldavian (and therefore Romanian) self-rule.

It was during those years that Nichita Smochină befriended the senior historian and nationalist politician Nicolae Iorga, a professor at the University of Bucharest. As early as 1922, he was invited by Iorga's Cultural League for the Unity of All Romanians to attend their Curtea de Argeș Congress and speak about Transnistrian grievances. Nichita Smochină also joined the Romanian Freemasonry (the "Vasile Alecsandri" Lodge), and, according to his own recollections, lectured other Masons on the plight of Transnistrians. Smochină met famous novelist Mihail Sadoveanu, who was later the Grand Master of a Freemasonry branch. There was mutual dislike between the two: Smochină accused Sadoveanu of trafficking Freemasonry's services, of not being moved by the fate of Transnistria, and of ultimately destroying other Masons who crossed his path. The Transnistrian activist despised two other figures from Romania's left-wing Poporanist camp, Alexandru Mîță and fellow Mason Gheorghe Stere, both of whom he depicted as unprincipled agents of Bolshevism.

=== Academic debut and Parisian studies ===
During the early and mid 1920s, Smochină's overviews of Transnistrian Romanian life were published with regularity in Iorga's Ramuri and Drum Drept magazines. In 1924, the former published his contributions to the ethnography of Romanian communities located between the Dniester and the Taurida Governorate. He was also a contributor to the Transylvanian review Societatea de Mâine, with a 1925 article on Christmas customs as preserved over the Dniester. He was later a manager of Tribuna Românilor Transnistrieni ("Tribune of the Romanian Transnistrians"), published from 1927 to 1928 in the Bessarabian city of Chișinău. The review had contributions from various Bessarabian Romanian activists (Halippa, Ștefan Bulat) and reported on new cases of human rights abuse in the Moldavian ASSR, such as the forceful relocation of Romanians away from the Dniester.

Romanian researcher Petre Popescu Gogan describes Smochină as: "a man of The Law, with a calling for human rights and the rights of peoples [...]. Asked for his say on the issue of Minority Rights, [he] worked in the Ministry of Foreign Affairs and took part in international congresses on the matter." From 1930 to 1935, the Transnistrian scholar was in France, where he furthered his studies. He was sponsored by Iorga, who awarded him a scholarship to help him enroll in the Romanian School of Fontenay-aux-Roses, and received additional financial assistance from Halippa. He still remained plagued by financial difficulties throughout his time in Paris. Journalist Nicolae Carandino, who met both Iorga and Smochină in Paris, found the latter to be a contrasting image to the former's flamboyance: "Smochină [...] seemed to embody the millennial synthesis of an all-too-tolerant, too kind, people." Carandino recounts that M. Calognomu, a failed and near-suicidal lawyer, found pleasure in "tormenting" Smochină—publicly suggesting that Smochină was an alcoholic, or that his academic work was useless.

Smochină focused his research on recovering old texts from sources such as the Bibliothèque Nationale and Musée Slave. Various reports suggest that he earned a Ph.D. in History from the University of Paris, with Ferdinand Lot as his doctoral advisor; historian Vladimir Solonari contradicts these sources: "he failed to obtain a doctorate there, [but] managed to collect rich materials on the history of the Transnistrian Mold[avi]ans, some of which he later published in Romania." He also began teaching Romanian at Société pour la Propagation des Langues Etrangères, a learned society funded by the University of Paris. At the time, Smochină's first account of the 1917 Lenin interview was published by Le Prométhée, the propaganda outlet for the Georgian Government in Exile. He also built contacts with the White émigré cells, meeting with philosopher Nikolai Berdyaev.

Concentrating on informing the world decision-makers about the Transnistrian question, Nichita Smochină was, in 1930, a delegate to International Congress of National Minorities (a League of Nations partnership). While in Paris, he also set up the Aid Committee for Moldavian Transnistrian Refugees, and campaigned for the international condemnation of reported Soviet mass murders in Transnistria (1932). He was a guest of the League's Sixth Commission on Minorities, which, after hearing his report, recognized that 2 million Romanians were still located outside Greater Romania's borders. According to his own statements, his positions on the matter were not fully welcomed by the President of the League, Romania's own Nicolae Titulescu, who asked Smochină to tone down his anti-Soviet discourse—though he still invited him to continue lecturing for the League. As part of his efforts to champion the cause, he awarded Titulescu a map of the Moldavian ASSR, which was drawn in his own hand; it showed Romanians living as a compact community in Transnistria, including as a "semicircle" around Odessa. As he soon discovered, Titulescu's reluctant position was endorsed by Ion Mihalache, who was chairing the governing National Peasants' Party (PNȚ). Smochină was disheartened to learn that Mihalache believed only in persuading the Soviet Union to recognize Bessarabia's union with Romania—his approach required a complete renunciation of territorial ambitions in Transnistria.

In a 1941 retrospective, Smochină also noted feeling let down by the League of Nations, and especially by its Nansen Office. As he put it, these institutions, working under "mysterious influences", had made special effort to bury his complaints at a meeting in December 1933. Some of Smochină's other work in Paris was focused on relief for Transnistrian refugees fleeing the Great Ukrainian Famine of 1932–1933. As a member of the Committee of Moldavian Refugees, in December 1933 he spoke about the trend which curbed Romanian liberties in the Soviet Union. In this context, he argued that the Moldavian ASSR was being run by non-Romanians, and especially by Soviet Jews, with only one Romanian, the peasant Negruță, as a token minister. He offered commentary on the Soviet propaganda techniques as related to the renewed anti-religious campaign, noting that Tiraspol's radio station was specifically conceived to draw Moldavians away from the church. Abroad, his pro-Romania group was being challenged by the Soviet-funded Association of Bessarabian Émigrés, whose platform was the whole absorption of Bessarabia into the Moldavian ASSR.

Smochină's scholarly work included a biographical sketch on Danylo (Dănilă) Apostol, the 18th-century Moldavian Hetman of Left-bank Ukraine. It saw print in Romania in 1930, together with his monograph on Moldavian mercenaries fighting on either side of the Great Northern War. The Apostol book was then reprinted in the popular history collection Cunoștințe utile ("Useful Knowledge"). In 1933, Paris' Librairie Universitaire J. Gamber published his monograph on Ion Brătianu, the founder of Romanian liberalism, focusing on Brătianu's trial for sedition in 1850s France. The work was reviewed by Revue des Questions Historiques, which noted that Smochină's style lacked "order" and "clarity", and could prove chronologically inaccurate. Around that time, the Transnistrian researcher announced that he was also preparing an overview of the Freemasonry's contribution to the first union of Romania (1859).

=== Moldova Nouă and 1930s research ===
In January 1935, Smochină launched a new periodical, titled Moldova Nouă ("New Moldavia"). Its opening manifesto, expressing a program of the Cultural Association of Transnistrians, promised to provide the Romanian public with a "generic culture" on the Moldavian life in Soviet lands, and to follow the principles of "objectivity, scientific truth [and] the national idea". This multilingual review, put out by an editorial headquarters in Iași and the Brawo printing press of Bucharest, only survived until 1936. Before closing down, the review had featured his essay Republica Moldovenească a Sovietelor ("The Moldavian Republic of Soviets"), republished in 1938 as a volume by Cartea Românească. In 1935, also with Moldova Nouă, Smochină released his French-language study Les Moldaves de Russie Soviétique ("The Moldavians of Soviet Russia"), illustrated with samples of Romanian folklore from the region—songs about cultural isolation and the impact of Russification. The following year, the magazine hosted his son Alexandru with an overview of literature from the Moldavian ASSR—it concluded that: "on top of an erroneous political thinking, on top of socialist misdirection, the Romanian soul shines through in this activity of Romanians under foreign occupation."

Smochină Sr was also contributing to Iorga's academic journal, Revue Historique du Sud-Est Européen. His essays there included the 1936 review of the Moldavian ASSR's standard primer Kuvyntu nostru, evidencing the agitprop aspect of Soviet education, the vilifying of "kulak" elements in Transnistrian society, and the plagiarizing of Romanian textbooks. Some two years later, Smochină, using the pseudonym Mihai Florin, began contributing to the Poporanist review Însemnări Ieșene, where he reviewed the work of Bessarabian folklorist Tatiana Gălușcă-Crâșmaru. Smochină followed up in 1939 with Din literatura populară a românilor de peste Nistru ("Samples of Romanian Folk Literature in Areas over the Dniester"), a communication for the Cluj-based scientific review Anuarul Arhivei de Folclor. It notably samples Transnistrian mournful lyrics about forced recruitment during the Russo-Turkish Wars. The work provided Romanians with glimpses into the research carried out by P. Chior among the Romanians of Novoukrainka, the Donbas, and the Caucasus; it also informed them of a possible connection between composer David Gershfeld and Transnistrian poet-folklorist Culai Neniu. Also in 1939, Smochină carried out his own ethnographic interviews within the Romanian Transnistrian exile community, on behalf of the Romanian Academy. As argued by ethnographer Constantin Eretescu, such contributions made him "the most significant researcher of folk culture in that area."

From 1938, under the National Renaissance Front regime, Smochină was in Bucharest, assigned to a clerical office in the Ministry of Minorities. His main activity in advancing the cause of Transnistrians was creating the Association of Transnistrian Romanians. It was designed to give further support to the Romanian refugees from that region, who were estimated at 20,000. Smochină himself estimated that there were in all some 1,200,000 Romanians living in the Moldavian ASSR, forming 80% of the native population—this remains the highest such estimate, significantly ahead of the number advanced in the 1910s by activist Alexis Nour. By the late 1930s, Smochină was contributing to Iorga's summer school program in Vălenii de Munte town. Physician G. Brătescu, who attended these conferences as an adolescent, notes that Smochină gave "frightening accounts" of life in Transnistria. Brătescu, who was also being introduced to Romanian Communist Party propaganda, also recalled that local communists dismissed Smochină's discourse as "fabrications by a provocateur, a bitter enemy of communism." In February 1939, a Soviet diplomatic mission to Bucharest presented Alexandru Cretzianu of the Romanian Foreign Ministry staff with a list of grievances prompted by Smochină's scholarly findings. Cretzianu reported at the time that each new writing by Smochină resulted in him receiving notes of protest from the Soviet Ambassador, Mikhail Ostrovsky.

Smochină's political and scientific activities were affected by the 1940 Soviet occupation of Bessarabia. He claims to have obtained an audience Romanian King Carol II, whom he tried to persuade that Bessarabia needed to be defended at the risk of war with the Soviets. He had escaped Chișinău in time, but his research material was left behind. The Stalinist regime declared him a persona non grata, and Soviet censorship repossessed and banned all of his published volumes. Smochină was to accuse the Soviet authorities of vandalizing the Chișinău printing press where he was publishing a voluminous scientific work, reportedly lost in the process. As a representative of the Transnistrian community, Smochină attached himself the Bessarabian Circle of Bucharest, presided over by Gherman Pântea. Also escaping the occupation, Claudia joined her father in Bucharest, where she married the Bessarabian-born linguist Diomid Strungaru.

The family was in Bucharest in 1940, when the loss of Northern Transylvania plunged Romania into a political crisis. Smochină deeply admired Ion Antonescu, who deposed Carol II and became Romania's dictatorial ruler, or Conducător, between September 1940 and August 1944. The Transnistrian ethnographer preserved Antonescu's image as a "great lover of the nation" and an "honest man", particularly since Antonescu promised to revisit the Bessarabian-Transnistrian issue "with an axe". He claims to have assisted Antonescu in his conflict with the Iron Guard, and that, following the civil war of January 1941, he published documents "meant to discredit" the Guardists. Also according to his memoirs, Smochină accompanied the Conducător on all of his visits to Nazi Germany, where Antonescu reportedly imposed respect on German dictator Adolf Hitler; he also joined Antonescu on trips to Italy and German-occupied Ukraine. At that time, Romania formalized its alliance with the Axis powers and, in summer 1941, joined Germany's sudden attack on the Soviet Union. During the early stages of war, the Romanian leader appointed Smochină his personal adviser on all things Transnistrian.

Smochină's 1941 works include the brochure Masacrele de la Nistru ("Massacres on the Dniester"), which accuse the Soviets of various crimes against the Romanian populace. Moldova Nouă was also reestablished, with the subtitle Revistă de studii și cercetări transnistriene ("Review of Transnistrian Studies and Research"), publishing Smochină's German-language work Die Rumänen zwischen Dnjestr und Bug ("The Romanians between the Dniester and the Bug"), detailing the activities of Romanian boyars in "New Russia". The magazine went out of print in 1942, but was replaced with the synonymously titled Transnistria, published by Smochină until 1944. His first-born son Alexandru N. Smochină also had contributions to the wartime press, writing for Octavian Tăslăuanu's nationalist review Dacia. He graduated from Iași Law School in 1940, while also completing officer training. The scholar's other son trained and worked as an engineer.

=== In the Governorate ===
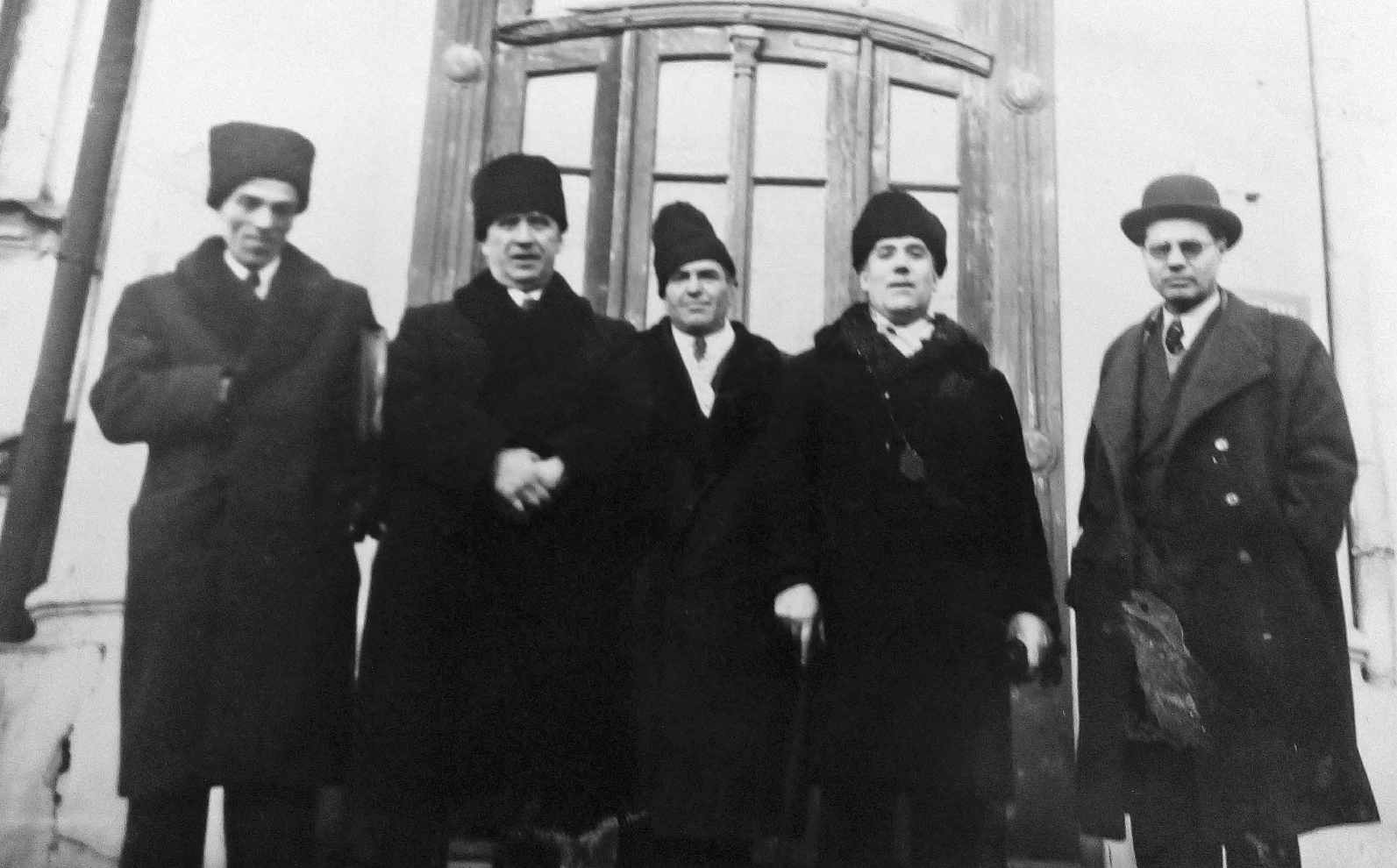
Romanian Bessarabian and Transnistrian activists meeting in Tiraspol, Transnistria Governorate, in 1941. From the left: Ilie Zaftur, Onisifor Ghibu, Ștefan Bulat, Pan Halippa, and Smochină

Following the reconquest of Bessarabia and the crossing of the Dniester, the Antonescu regime created a Transnistria Governorate, which was stretched to include the former Moldavian ASSR and Odessa. As noted by Smochină, this move created tensions between the various interest groups backing Antonescu. He reports his tense meeting with Gendarmerie commander Constantin Vasiliu, which took place at Tighina in August 1941. Vasiliu informed him: "I barely stand up to the [threat posed by] communists and Soviet agents in the country, while Antonescu wants to extend our administration up to the Dnieper River. Under no circumstances can this be done."

That same month, at Tiraspol, Smochină and Mayor Petru Torpan presided over the delegation of notables which welcomed there Antonescu and the new Romanian King, Michael I. As the "representative of Romanian Transnistrians", he noted that "thanks to the armies of Michael I, in their unparalleled bravery, so gallantly led by Marshal Antonescu, the Dniester shall no longer mark a border between brothers." Smochină was allegedly considered by the Conducător for the position of Transnistrian Governor. Some reports have it that he refused this appointment, and asked that the position go to another academic, Gheorghe Alexianu; Smochină himself noted that he refused an executive office because he wanted to act as a legislator and jurist, ensuring that Transnistria and Romania were united with each other under the terms of international law. Such claims are partly contradicted by Solonari, who describes Smochină as always resentful of Alexianu, "whom he saw as unduly awarded the post that should have rightfully belonged to him".

Also then, Gherman Pântea became the Mayor of Odessa, which ensured his "permanent collaboration" with Smochină. Smochină also took an active part in appointing the other members of Transnistria's administration, including Alexandru Smochină, who was taken off active duty and made Second Prefect of Transnistria's Berezovca County. As Solonari writes, the appointment showed that "Smochină himself was not immune to the allure of rent"; "he was reported to have received 'gifts' from [Transnistria's] Department of Culture [...], consisting of art objects looted from Odessa museums." Smochină Sr accepted less formal appointments, which included his selection as President of the National Moldavian Council, on December 15, 1941. He oversaw efforts to make Transnistrians re-learn Romanian, and also participated in negotiations for the release of Romanian prisoners of war. His conflicts with other activists pushed him to present his resignation from the Cultural Association of Transnistrians, but Romania's Vice Premier, Mihai Antonescu, refused to accept it. He "still considered him as the only authorized representative of the Transnistrian Romanian refugees." In January 1942, the Vice Premier formed a "Peace Bureau"—namely, a body of experts tasked with presenting the Romanian case at the envisaged peace congress. Smochină sat on two subsections: one from press and propaganda, and the other for ethnic, biological and statistical data.

Smochină soon found himself ill at ease with the Governorate's military and civilian administration, noting instances where Alexianu and Vasiliu derided their Bessarabian subordinates. Alexianu in particular felt irritated when the National Moldavian Council pressed him for appointments in the new administration: "upset by what he understandably considered its members' impudence, [he] put the Council on hold." The governor reportedly tried to gain control of the National Moldavian Council by advancing Ștefan Bulat for the chairmanship, on grounds that "Smochină spent most of his time in Bucharest." This attempt was blocked by Romania's Mihai Antonescu, who made sure that Smochină was present for the election, and that he emerged as winner. Alexianu was forced to retaliate by making Bulat head of the Scientific Institute of Transnistria, which was specifically created to overshadow Smochină's Council. Alexandru was welcomed by the new body, serving as its branch director in Tiraspol. He also founded the Moldavian Circle, which disseminated propaganda and popularized Romanian historiography.

=== Antonescu's downfall ===
A disappointed Nichita Smochină left detailed notes on the corrupt activities of other Transnistrian officials, including Bulat. He recounts that Bulat profited from the deportation of Jews, including by forcing a Jewish girl to become his concubine. Smochină describes the 1941 Odessa massacre, ordered by Ion Antonescu in retaliation for a supposed Jewish plot against the Romanian command, as a grave error on the Romanians' part: as he noted, both he and Pântea had been informed that the building supposedly bombed by Jewish activists had in fact been mined by the retreating Soviets. Smochină also claimed that Antonescu saw Hitler's war on the "three occult forces" (Jews, Freemasons and the Catholic Church) as a "great mistake" which could lose Germany the war. In Smochină's account, the Conducător had gone on to state: "[Hitler] could have easily lured the Jewry on his side, and after the war he'd have been able to wrestle with it, but not in this destructive manner, that one is not humane." In June 1943, he was present for the Conducător's official visit to the newly acquired territories. As he reported in his memoirs, this occasion showed that Alexianu had engineered a "Potemkeniad", with fields that had been plowed only alongside the roads, and with a nursing home that existed "solely for inspection."

On July 2, 1942, Smochină was made an honorary member of the Romanian Academy. He was at the time working under anthropologist Traian Herseni, involved in a large interdisciplinary effort to collect and systematize the folkloric creation of Transnistrian Romanians; his contribution was featured in Gheorghe Pavelescu's 1943 monograph Aspecte din spiritualitatea românilor transnistrieni: Credințe și obiceiuri ("Aspects of the Spirituality of the Transnistrian Romanians: Beliefs and Customs"). The investigation also aimed to react against decades of anti-religious campaigning, and consciously excluded all folklore which showed Soviet-era influences. According to Solonari, the sociological teams which were sent into Transnistria were toning down the Smochinăs' "wild claims" about Romanian identity east of the Dniester; one member of the sociological teams, Paul Mihăilescu, noted that the Romanian-speakers of Valea Hoțului regarded "differentiation based on ethnicity [...] as irrelevant". As supervisor of the social survey, Anton Golopenția left "especially incisive" comments regarding Smochină's count of Romanians on the Dniester, noting his "flagrant arithmetical errors."

Also in 1943, Smochină Sr curated for print Cartea moldovanului ("The Moldavian's Book"), which featured Ion Antonescu's address to "our beloved Transnistrians". For a while, he was in the Crimea, helping Romanian historian Gheorghe I. Brătianu to recover the letters addressed by his ancestor, Ion Brătianu, to Nicholas I of Russia. The two scholars met at Livadia Palace, outside Yalta. Smochină Sr also enjoyed friendly contacts with the Ukrainian exile community, represented by Hnat Porokhivskyi. At the time, Germany did not wish to see these groups returning into Ukraine; according to Porokhivskyi, the Germans expected most of Ukrainian territory to be divided between the Axis states. As reported by the Siguranța, in August 1942 Porokhivskyi addressed Smochină, "the leader of Transnistrians in our country, to obtain repatriation or to be sent as workers and clerks in Transnistria." Similarly, Smochină maintained contacts with local Russians, and helped anti-communist surgeon Pavel Chasovnikov (Ceasovnicov) in receiving Romanian citizenship rights. In his native area of Dubăsari, the scholar played host to Romanian students coming in from Bucharest and from Odessa's Romanian Cultural Institute. By the end of World War II he had received the Order of the Star of Romania, the Order of the Crown, Meritul Cultural, and the Holy See's Benemerenti medal.

By early 1944, the Axis had been dealt major defeats on the Eastern Front, and the Soviets began their menacing Dnieper–Carpathian Offensive. As ordered by Antonescu, Smochină and his rival Golopenția oversaw the evacuation of some 10,000 Transnistrian Romanians into Romanian-held southern Bessarabia; Smochină proposed to the Conducător "that all Moldavians [in Transnistria] should be crossed over the Dniester for fear of Soviet retaliation." The change of fortunes alarmed Bessarabian and Transnistrian activists: Smochină, Halippa and Boldur joined others in a diplomatic effort to convince the Western Allies that Bessarabia needed to be part of Romania, but the military situation prevented them from ever leaving Romania. The subsequent Battle of Romania evacuated Romanian administration from Transnistria, Bessarabia, and even parts of Moldavia-proper. In August 1944, King Michael's Coup toppled Antonescu and took Romania out of the Axis. Smochină claimed to have personally been helping Antonescu in negotiating a separate peace with the Allied Powers, days before the regime fell. After Antonescu's arrest, the former Transnistria adviser lived a secluded life, and focused on writing his works of history.

=== Communist repression ===
In June 1945, the Allied Commission in Bucharest issued a selective ban on Smochină's writings, including Republica Moldovenească a Sovietelor and Masacrele de la Nistru. Singled out for retribution by the Soviet occupation forces, he was shielded by his Academy colleagues, who gave him a false name and employed him as an estate administrator in Titulești. When a Romanian communist regime came into existence, all his works were officially censored, and the remaining copies were tracked down and confiscated. According to Popescu Gogan, he was especially sought after for his Masacrele de la Nistru. Soviet occupiers picked up Smochină Jr, who was at the time living in Romania with his wife and daughter, and working as an attorney. According to one account, this was case of clerical error: they deported Alexandru to the Gulag only because they mistook him for his father. The story was contradicted by more detailed research into the period. It surfaced that Alexandru was interrogated for his wartime activities in Berezovca and Tiraspol. He was thus formally accused of promoting Romanianization, of spying against the Soviet state, and of causing some 964 million roubles of damage to Transnistria. Found guilty, he was given 25 years of hard labor, to be served in Amur Oblast. He was in fact taken farther north, to the Sevvostlag in Kolyma, where he worked on the coal mines.

Smochină Sr went into hiding with assistance from the PNȚ leader, Iuliu Maniu; hoping that their target would return, from 1954 the Soviets had a soldier on guard on Nicolae Golescu Street, Bucharest, which has been his last known residence. Smochină still used aliases, including "Gheorghe Ionescu", and tried to make himself lost in the Carpathian Mountains (specifically, the Banatian ranges). Answering to a request made by Antonescu, he buried his Transnistrian documents in a pit at an undisclosed location near Caransebeș. Smochină ended up in prison, and, as he recalled, was subjected to numerous beatings. His academician's title, his pension and his right of attending the Romanian Academy Library were all removed from him (see List of purged members of the Romanian Academy). His son-in-law, Diomid Strungaru, was stripped of all positions in academia, and had to work at a clothes iron factory.

By 1955, with Destalinization in full swing, both Smochinăs were unceremoniously released. Alexandru was picked up from his place of exile, and dropped back to Romania as a released prisoner of war, with no papers on him. Since this rendered him effectively a nonperson, he was forced to support himself by menial labor despite his health being compromised by silicosis. In 1956, his father also returned to Bucharest. In April of that year, an anonymous informant wrote to the Soviet Embassy that "a mortal enemy of the communist regime" had returned to Matei Golescu Street; this resulted in his being tracked down by the repressive apparatus, which opened a dossier on Smochină Sr in March 1957. In 1957–1958, the regime's secret police, or Securitate, proceeded to tail Smochină, in order to determine his importance to the revival of pan-Romanianism. His circle was infiltrated by informants—including an employee of the Academy Library, who allowed him to use the facility while spying on his work and his contacts. Securitate reports summarized his career in nationalist politics: "before the year 1944 he edited and managed various publications with anti-Soviet content, drafted and printed a significant number of anti-Soviet books and generated large-scale propaganda efforts to support the Antonescu war through conferences, lectures and by other means." Himself a former prisoner, Pântea was being pressured into becoming a Securitate informant on Transnistrian activities in Bucharest.

In August 1958, the Securitate arrested Constantin N. Tomescu. Tomescu had been singled out for his nationalist poem, Dor de Basarabia, which he had read out publicly at his wife's funeral, where Nichita Smochină was a guest. This allowed the authorities to detain and interrogate Smochină on February 6–7, 1959. In December, Securitate agents intimidated Smochină from attending the funeral of former Bessarabian dignitary Grigore Cazacliu, but, during interrogations, he denied knowledge (or feigned unawareness) of a plot to enthrone Tomescu as Bessarabian Metropolitan. Securitate sources claimed that the Bessarabian-and-Transnistrian underground was planning a set of measures to occur after the future "liberation of Bessarabia", and that Smochină was discussing a return to Chișinău. According to other such reports, Smochină was always fully aware of being followed around by Securitate operatives, and tried to protect his friends by avoiding contact with them. By 1961, the authorities were closing in for his prosecution, but eventually settled on intimidating him, noting that he was old, sickly, and psychologically affected by personal loss—the latter referred to the accidental death of Constantin Smochină, seen by Nichita as a disguised assassination.

=== Under national communism ===
In early 1962, the official history magazine, Studii, published a review by Dan Simonescu, informing the public that "Slavist N. Smochină" owned a copy of laws passed in the early 15th century, under by Alexander I of Moldavia: "he has studied the manuscript and promises [to publish] a study for its authentication". Notes left by Smochină himself suggest that he had a personal experience of the Romanian–Soviet hostilities, which began in February 1963: though still followed around by the Securitate, his thoughts on the Romanian claims in Bessarabia were no longer perceived as criminal. Allegedly, he found more understanding from Romania's new national communist leader, Nicolae Ceaușescu, who took power in 1965. He claimed that, already that year, Ceaușescu asked him to retrieve those documents which showed Antonescu's move to a separate peace; driven by a Securitate guard to Caransebeș, Smochină only recovered three empty crates.

According to his own report, Smochină discussed these issues with a communist researcher, Ion Popescu-Puțuri, who informed him that the Soviets had confiscated all they could find of the Antonescu–Smochină letters, and would only send some photocopies to Bucharest, for the Securitate to hold as evidence against the scholar. The Securitate's failure to review such documents in time had unwittingly spared Smochină's life at the height of 1950s repressions. The Communist Party made an effort to collect, preserve and research Smochină's documents, including those that had been part of his Securitate file during the previous years. Reportedly, Popescu-Puțuri told Smochină that the Romanian state would resume propaganda efforts among the Soviet Romanians: "We have kept informed and are aware of the Russian injustices against Bessarabian and Transnistrian Romanians, of the forceful removal of locals and of how Russians are brought in to take their place. However, we are waiting for the right moment to raise that issue with a chance at success. To regain our lost provinces."

Smochină remained skeptical regarding this objective—in his view, only a Chinese–Soviet hot war could effect a regime change that would benefit Romanians in those regions. At that junction, Ceaușescu allowed his Transnistrian acquaintance to receive a new pension, but he was denied reintegration into the Academy, with the suggestion that such a move would dampen Romania–Russia relations. These were openly tested by the Bessarabian community in February 1967, when Halippa presented Ceaușescu's Council of State with reports on the existence of oppressed Soviet Romanians. These included a polemical note by Smochină, who condemned the Soviet-endorsed delimitation of a "Moldovan people" in Bessarabia, and in general the ideology of "Moldovenism". A month later, Halippa advanced Smochină's name among those of Bessarabians who could serve as specialists for the Romanian Communist Party's ISISP foundation of social science.

Smochină's health was affected by a stroke in 1968, by 1971 he was using a crutch for the "little walking that I do". He remained "paralyzed in half of his body after an outrage, [but] taught himself to write again, and never dropped his pen down to the moment of his death." He was recovered by the Romanian and Soviet schools of Slavistics, commissioned for translations from Slavonic documents which were published by either the Romanian Academy or the Moscow Academy of Sciences. He was allowed back at the Academy Library, but still banned from authoring contributing original books of his own.

Two of Smochină's new articles saw print in the new popular history review, Magazin Istoric; one of them, published in April 1970, claimed that the fragmentary 12th-century Gospel preserved in Râșnov was an original contribution by a Romanian, and mixed Romanian words in with the basic Slavonic text. This claim was reviewed and debunked by linguist Gheorghe Mihăilă, who reported that Smochină was misreading Slavonic terms as Latin derivations. In the 1970s, Smochină also published articles in a specialized magazine based in Thessaloniki, Greece, and donated his documents and manuscripts to the National Archives of Romania. Strungaru was also allowed back to work in universities, and Smochină moved in with him and Claudia.

=== Final years ===
Securitate surveillance of the Bessarabian colony was reactivated in March 1969, when Halippa attempted to commemorate the 1918 union by setting up a private foundation for the study of Moldavian history—which threatened the communist monopoly on historical memory. By then, the secret police had been informed that Halippa was conspiring with Alexandru Usatiuc-Bulgăr to set up a National Patriotic Liberation Fund, whose very existence risked bringing Romania into a major conflict with "certain states", "that which contradicts our policies of party and state." Smochină's name was brought up in the investigation, as he had been proposed for co-leadership of Halippa's organization. Exiled Bessarabians could still profit from the relative tolerance of Romania's national communist system, and began organizing themselves into advocacy groups, even establishing links in the West. Smochină himself tried to mediate between the two competing factions: one represented by Ion Păscăluță (and supported by Halippa); the other headed by Anton Crihan.

By 1973, Halippa was mounting a continuous petitioning campaign, asking Ceaușescu to honor his commitments toward Romanians living in the Soviet Union, as well as toward the exile community. As part of this, he insisted that government take note of Smochină's "deplorable situation". That year, the Securitate, having bugged Halippa's home, noted with satisfaction that their gaslighting campaign had worked: both he and Smochină had agreed that all relevant historical documents needed to be "handed down to the authorities"; Halippa ensured that Smochină continued to transmit parts of his own archives to be sealed by the regime. In his letters to Crihan, Smochină insisted on the importance of "internationalizing the Bessarabian cause"—noting that he himself was no longer physically capable of mounting such a campaign. He is the likely instigator of a defiant gesture, which took place when the Bessarabians rallied in Cernica to bury the remains of Ion Pelivan—one of the wreaths was marked "from the friends of Transnistria". This irritated Securitate men, one of whom informed Halippa that they had been receiving complaints from "a certain embassy, which took offense at what the inscription said".

At that late stage, Smochină's research was mainly focused on proving that, traditionally, the Russians had regarded Transnistria as a legally distinct, Romanian-governed, part of "New Russia". In April 1978, he informed Crihan that he was working on an article for the Slavic Review, wherein he theorized that the Reims Gospel was the work of a Romanian, "with some Romanian words thrown in there". He never published such a work, but communicated his thoughts to a historian, Constantin C. Giurescu, who embraced Smochină's views and popularized them in one of his own final texts. According to Mihăilă, the entire argument lacked scientific grounding; Smochină, he notes, misidentified Romanian words by improperly sectioning the Gospel' continuous writing.

In an April 1979 article, George Muntean deplored Smochină's absence from the newly-published dictionary of Romanian historians. With the death of many friends, Smochină only still received visits from Elefterie Sinicliu; as he informed Crihan: "I fear that now it is my turn and that I shall not see my dreamed-of hope coming to bear fruit, for the disease is getting to me." The final entries in his private diary show that he remained unpersuaded by Ceaușescu, "the dictator", whom he viewed as an incompetent manager of Romania's economy, while also reacting against his cult of personality. Smochină died in Bucharest, on the morning of December 14, 1980, and was buried three days later at Reînvierea, in Colentina. This came as his last ever paper was being reviewed for publication by the Greek Institute for Balkan Studies.

== Legacy ==
Smochină's entire work and life were again in public focus after the December 1989 Revolution overthrew Ceaușescu. On July 3, 1990, he was posthumously reinstated honorary Academy member. Another sign of this recovery came in 1993, when philologist Iordan Datcu published an article detailing Smochină's ethnographic work. This project saw Datcu establishing a connection with Alexandru Smochină, who had retired from his job at the Academy Library: "A man of pallid complexion, very sad and extremely uncommunicative. [...] Later I found out that he was wearing a pacemaker." Before his death in 2002, he had completed his own book of prison memoirs, titled Care Patrie? ("What Motherland?").

Nichita Smochină's main ethnographic research was featured in the 1996 anthology Românitatea transnistriană ("Transnistrian Romanianness"), published in Bucharest by Editura Semne. Smochină is also remembered by the authorities of Moldova, the Bessarabian state created by the dissolution of the Soviet Union, where Alexandru Smochină was formally rehabilitated in 1996. Moldovan President Mihai Ghimpu awarded Smochină Sr posthumous Order of Honor insignia in April 2010. Smochină is not honored in Transnistria-proper, which is ruled by a breakaway pro-Russian regime. Reportedly, Alexandru Smochină tried to visit his ancestral home in Mahala (where a "Smokine" family still lives), but was prevented from entering the premises by a group of local Russians.

Cartea moldovanului was reportedly expunged from public records by Soviet authorities. Only one copy survived to the post-Soviet era, having been kept by a woman living somewhere near Odessa. Nichita Smochină's memoirs (or Memorii) were published, care of Editura Academiei, in 2009, followed in 2012 by Pagini din însemnările unui rebel, at Editura Samia of Iași. The editor is Vlad Galin-Corini, son-in-law of Diomid Strungaru. Commentators have described the former book as a revelation, in particular for its detail on the various public figures whom the Transnistrian ethnologist had met before 1944. According to Galin-Corini, these works were also rejected by editors in Moldova, because they make brazen statements about Bessarabians who collaborated with the Soviets. In June 2012, they were positively reviewed as part of a Smochină symposium at the Moldovan Academy of Sciences. Two years later, Alexandru Smochină's Care Patrie? was published, alongside a memoir of his father—Nichita Smochină. Vox clamantis in deserto. Both works had Vadim Guzun as editor. In 2015, Datcu issued a new edition of Din literatura populară.
