= Culai Neniu =

Moldovan folklorist, dramatist, and schoolteacher (1905–1939)

Culai Neniu (Russian: Кулай Неню; born Nikolai Semyonovich Nenev, Николаи Семёнович Ненев, also N. S. Nenev-Potynga, Н. С. Ненев-Потынга; 1905–1939) was a Moldovan folklorist, dramatist, and schoolteacher. Of a Bessarabian Bulgarian background, he left the Kingdom of Romania to settle in the Soviet Union, making his way into the Moldavian Autonomous Soviet Socialist Republic (MASSR). He published several volumes of "Moldavian" folklore, generally professional in nature, but also tinged by the effects of Soviet historiography. With Ekaterina Lebedeva, Neniu put out in 1935 the anthology Cîntece poporane moldovenești ("Moldavian Folk Songs"), noted as the only work of its kind to coincide with the Latinization of Soviet scripts. The collection was criticized in Romania for excluding religious folklore, but was also in contradiction with the MASSR's state ideology. This resulted in Neniu's execution by the NKVD, four years after publication.

== Early life ==
The future folklorist was a native of the Bessarabia Governorate, who rejected union with Romania and emigrated to the MASSR. Romanian author Sergiu Grossu notes that both Neniu and Dmitrii Milev were ethnic Bulgarians "who came over from Romania"; he opposes them to other MASSR writers, such as Nistor Cabac and Filimon Săteanu, who were ethnic Romanians, and therefore held in lower regard by the communist establishment. Born Nikolai Semyonovich Nenev (Romanian: Nicolae Nenev), in 1905, "Culai Neniu" was educated at the Pedagogical School in Balta, which then employed him as a music teacher (1928–1930).

== Musical career ==
In 1928, he established a chamber choir in Tiraspol, also serving as its first conductor. In 1930, the activity drew attention from the MASSR government, who invested in enlarging and improving the choir. Expanded from 15 to 30 people after recruitment around Tiraspol, it came to be led by a professional composer, Konstantin Pirgov, who took it on tours across Ukraine.

Also employed by the Moldavian Scientific Center in 1930–1937, Neniu was in contact with writer Pavel Chioru, who advised him to begin work as a folklorist. This activity resulted in the recording of over 1,000 poems and songs, the first installments of which appeared before 1935 as two volumes (Romanian titles: Cu ciocanul toc și toc, Cântăm și noi). Neniu's creative period overlapped with the adoption of Latin script for the Soviet Union's national languages, including "Moldavian". This change was announced by the MASSR regional committee of the Ukrainian Communist Party as an "enormous victory for the Leninist nationalities policy", since it allowed "Moldavian workers" in Bessarabia and Ukraine to write the same way, advancing communist ideas among the former. With Ekaterina Lebedeva, Neniu contributed a Latin-script Cîntece poporane moldovenești, appearing at either Balta or Tiraspol in 1935. It sampled 170 works of verse, some of them originating in Bessarabia; it recorded them in a language fully compatible with modern Romanian, but featured unfamiliar terms of Russian origin, which were explained in footnotes. The work was primarily political: S. Soloviova, who authored the preface, noted that, though Cîntece poporane included no works of post-revolutionary folklore, it had successfully evidenced the Moldavians' hatred of Tsarist autocracy and Russian Orthodoxy. In his subsequent review, the exile anti-communist Nichita Smochină argued that Neniu and Lebedeva had produced a biased sample, which fully omitted religious folklore—colinde, bocete, and wedding songs.

Although controversial on such grounds, Neniu and Lebedeva's collection had cultural importance for its minuteness of detail and its professionalism, as well as for being the only Latin-script collection of Moldavian folklore to have been printed anywhere in the MASSR. Both authors, together with Chioru, fell short of ideological commands, and were summoned to self-criticism sessions, ending with the "direst consequences" for them. Neniu's downfall was related to the conflicting visions of proletarian internationalism, as espoused by the Soviet government, and Moldovenism, as embraced by Leonid Madan and his followers within the MASSR. As early as 1934, activist B. Lehtman had published in Krasnaya Bessarabiya an attack on the "counterrevolutionary nationalists" from within the Moldavian Scientific Center. In this context, he alleged that "Nenev" had worked as a policeman in either Russia or Romania, as well as having been an officer in the White movement. Neniu was drawn into a trial of the Moldovenist (or "originalist") intellectuals, which culminated in March 1934, when Madan was arrested and his books were destroyed.

== Later life and legacy ==
Neniu died in 1939, being summarily shot by an NKVD executioner. Shortly after this, the Soviet occupation of Bessarabia established the new Moldavian Soviet Socialist Republic, into which half of the MASSR was folded. Neniu and Pirgov's choir was moved to Chișinău, where it was reformed as the Doina chorale. Its first conductor was David Gershfeld. Neniu's work reportedly included an unfinished political play, Grozescu, which depicted Moldavian outlaws (haiduci) in a modernized setting, using folklore as the main inspiration. Ethnologist Victor Cirimpei proposes that Grozescu was reused by Gershfeld in writing the "first Moldavian opera", Grozovan, in 1955. In 1975, philologist Ion D. Ciobanu published a collection of folk poems from various intermediary sources, with Neniu cited by name. His memory is cultivated in post-Soviet Moldova. In 2011, Andrei Sochircă performed a monologue based on works by Neniu and other MASSR writers who were shot in or after the Great Purge.
