= Anatol Petrencu =

Moldovan politician and historian

Personal details
- Born: 22 May 1954 (age 72) Căuşeni
- Party: European Action Movement
- Children: 2
- Education: Moldova State University
- Profession: Historian

Anatol Petrencu (born 22 May 1954) is a politician, historian and academic from the Republic of Moldova. In 1990-1992 he was the dean of the Faculty of History of the State University of Moldova, and between 1998 and 2006 he was president of the Association of Historians of Moldova. Between 2006 and 2010 he was the president of the European Action Movement party. Since October 2010 he has been the director of the Institute of Social History "ProMemoria". Vice President of the Liberal Party.

== Biography ==
Anatol Petrencu, the PhD in historical sciences, university professor, was born on 22 May 1954 in Căuşeni. He carried out his compulsory military service in the Soviet army (1972–1974). He graduated from Moldova State University in 1980 and between 1982 and 1985 he studied at Moscow State Institute of International Relations. He has been working for Moldova State University since 1985. He did doctoral studies at the Institute of International Economic and Political Research of the Academy of Sciences of the Russian Federation. In 1986 he passed his Masters' thesis with the theme "Romanian-Italian relations in the 70s - the first half of the 80s", and in 1998 he became a PhD in historical sciences with the work "Romania's Policy on Bessarabia, 1940-1944". In 1990-1992 he was the dean of the Faculty of History of the MSU, and between 1998 -2006 he was president of the Association of Historians of Moldova. Between 2006 and 2010 he was the president of the European Action Movement (Romanian: Mişcarea Acţiunea Europeană). Anatol Petrencu is a member of the Commission for the Study of the Communist Dictatorship in Moldova. Since October 2010 he has been the director of the Institute of Social History "ProMemoria".

In March 2011 the European Action Movement party merged with the Liberal Party.

Pro-Russian media in Moldova and elsewhere considers Petrencu a Holocaust denier, due to his positive views on Ion Antonescu and his anti-Soviet stance. Petrencu claims that Antonescu and the Romanian Army liberated Bessarabia from Soviet occupation and that the introduction of the history of the Holocaust as a school subject is a mistake.

== Publications ==
=== Monographs ===
- The historical education in Romania (1948-1989), Chișinău, Știința Publishing House, 1991, 112 p.
- Romanian-Italian relations: from confrontation to collaboration. 1945-1985, Chișinău, Universitas Publishing House, 1993, 216 p.
- Bessarabia in the Second World War: 1940-1944, Chișinău, Luceum Publishing House, 1997, 346 p.
- Romania and Bessarabia in the Second World War, Chișinău, Epigraf Publishing House, 1999, 176 p.
- The Poles in the Second World War. Political History, Chișinău, Cartdidact Publishing House, 2005, 246 p .; 2nd edition, Anastatic, Iași, Tipo Moldova Publishing House, 2010.
- Bessarabia during the Second World War: 1939-1945, Chișinău, Prut International Publishing House, 2006, 224 p .; 2nd edition, Anastatic, Iasi, Tipo Moldova Publishing House, 2010.
- Warsaw seen by a Bessarabian historian, Chișinău, Cartdidact Publishing House, 2006, 144 p.

=== Collections of articles ===
- In the service of the goddess Clio, Chișinău, the editorial-polygraphic company Typography Central, 2001, 816 p.
- Contemporary history: studies, materials, attitudes, Chișinău, Cartdidact Publishing House, 2011, 580 p.

=== Document collections ===
- Chrestomation to the History of Romanians. 1917-1992 (in collaboration), Chisinau, Universitas Publishing House, 1993, 295 p.
- In defense of national history and dignity. Collection of documents (in collaboration), Chisinau, Cartdidact Publishing House, 2003, 96 p.
- The Poles in the Second World War. Document collection, Chisinau, Cartdidact Publishing House, 2004, 240 pages; 2nd edition, Anastatic, Iasi, Tipo Moldova Publishing House, 2010.
- Marshal Ion Antonescu and Bessarabia. 1941-1944. Collection of documents (in collaboration), Iași, Demiurg Publishing House, 2008, 350 p.

=== University textbooks ===
- Universal history. Contemporary Age, 1939-1993 (Europe, USA, Canada), lectures, Chișinău, Știința Publishing House, 1995, 272 p.
- Universal history. Contemporary Era, 1939-1995 (Europe, USA, Canada), lectures, Second Edition completed, Chișinău, Muzeum Publishing House, 1995, 346 p.
- Universal history. Contemporary Era, 1939-1996 (Europe, USA, Canada), lectures, 3rd edition completed, Chișinău, Muzeum Publishing House, 1995, 346 p .; 4th edition, Anastatic, Iasi, Tipo Moldova Publishing House, 2010.

== Bibliography ==
- Profesorul şi istoricul Anatol Petrencu 50 de ani (Le professeur et historien Anatol Petrencu a 50 ans). In: Cugetul, 2004, 2, p. 75-76.
