= Ștefan Buchiu =

Romanian Orthodox cleric, theologian, and academic

The Very Reverend Father Ștefan Buchiu
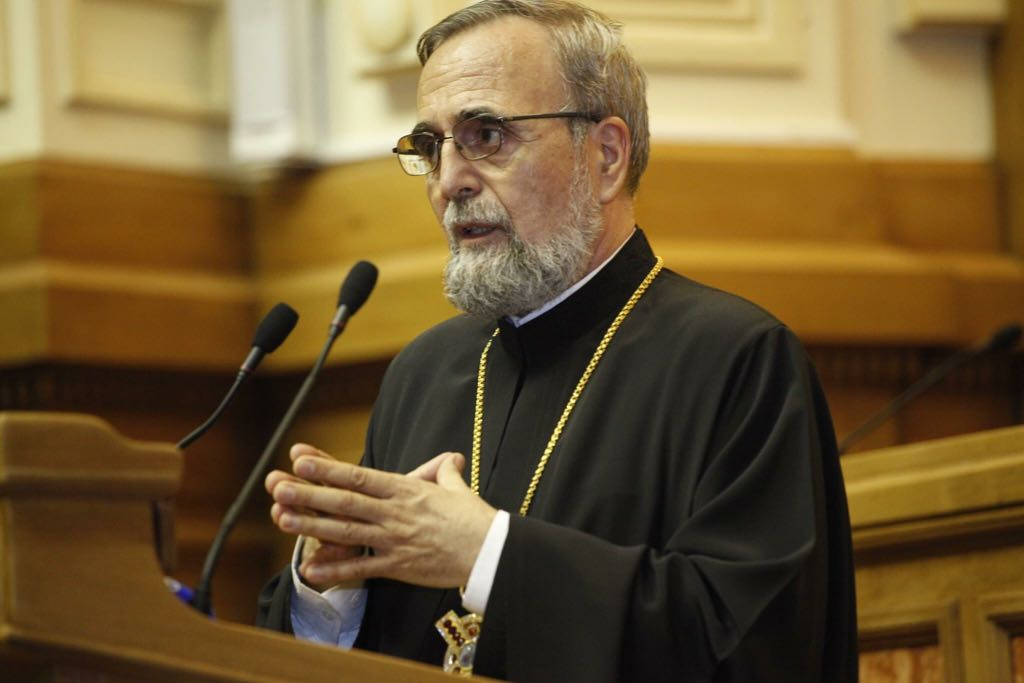
- Fr. Ștefan Buchiu at a university event in 2017
- Born: 27 March 1953 (age 73); Pitești, Romania
- Education: Bucharest Institute of Orthodox Theology; University of Bucharest (PhD); Bossey Ecumenical Institute; University of Geneva
- Occupations: Cleric; Theologian; Author; Emeritus Professor
- Years active: 1990–present
- Known for: Work in Orthodox Dogmatic Theology; Dean of the Faculty of Orthodox Theology, University of Bucharest (2008–2018)
- Notable work: Incarnation and Unity (1997); Orthodoxy and Secularization (1999); Dictionary of Orthodox Theology (2017)
- Title: Honorary Diocesan Vicar
- Awards: Elevation to archpriest (2004); Right to wear the Patriarchal Cross of Romania (2018)

Ștefan Buchiu (Romanian pronunciation: [ˈʃte.fan ˈbu.kʲu]; born March 27, 1953) is a Romanian Orthodox cleric and theologian known for his work in Orthodox dogmatic theology. He is an emeritus professor at the University of Bucharest's Faculty of Orthodox Theology and holds the position of Honorary Diocesan Vicar at the Archdiocese of Bucharest within the Romanian Orthodox Church. He served as dean of the Faculty of Orthodox Theology from 2008 to 2018.

As a disciple of the prominent Romanian Orthodox theologian Father Dumitru Stăniloae, his academic work builds upon and expands his mentor's theological insights, with a focus on understanding and communicating Orthodox theology.

== Biography ==
=== Early life and family ===
Born in Pitești, Argeș County, Ștefan Buchiu was raised in a family deeply ingrained in the Orthodox faith, being the son of priest Piru Buchiu and presbytera Viorica Buchiu. The family environment emphasized religious service, with Ștefan being the youngest of five children, four of whom pursued clerical careers.

=== Education ===
Ștefan Buchiu began his theological studies in 1968 at the Theological Seminary in Craiova, graduating in 1973. He continued his education at the University Theological Institute in Bucharest from 1973 to 1977, where he distinguished himself academically, graduating as valedictorian. He pursued advanced theological studies, completing doctoral research at the same institution from 1977 to 1980, with further studies at the Bossey Ecumenical Institute, University of Geneva in Switzerland, during 1983–1984.

In 1993, Buchiu defended his doctoral thesis, titled Incarnation and Unity. The Restoration of the Cosmos in Jesus Christ at the Faculty of Orthodox Theology, University of Bucharest. This work was supervised by Fr. Prof. Dumitru Popescu and is noted for contributing to the field of Orthodox Dogmatic Theology.

== Academic career ==
=== Teaching career ===
In 1990, Ștefan Buchiu began his tenure at the Faculty of Orthodox Theology at the University of Bucharest, initially serving as a university assistant. Throughout the years, he progressed through academic positions, from lecturer to associate professor, and was appointed as a university professor and doctoral advisor in Orthodox Dogmatic Theology in 2007. During his professorship, he worked on enhancing the theological curriculum to offer a comprehensive education in Orthodox studies.

=== Dean of the Faculty of Orthodox Theology ===
From 2008 to 2018, Buchiu served as the Dean of the Faculty of Orthodox Theology, and from 2009 to 2013, he also took on the role of Director of the Doctoral School. Similar to graduate programs in the US, this school oversees the research and studies of PhD students.

==== International impact and collaborations ====
During his tenure, Fr. Ștefan Buchiu actively engaged in fostering international collaborations, expanding faculty collaborations with Orthodox theological institutions globally. His efforts were directed towards facilitating academic dialogues, exchanges, and cooperative projects, contributing to a more interconnected Orthodox academic community.

Buchiu was involved in establishing partnerships with various Orthodox theological academies and universities around the world, including Kyiv, Moscow, Saint Petersburg, Athens, Balamand, and Fribourg. These collaborations aimed to enhance academic dialogue and support unity within the global Orthodox theological education network.

Under his direction, a collaboration was initiated with Saint Vladimir's Orthodox Theological Seminary in the US, starting in 2013. This partnership included student and faculty exchanges, alongside joint dialogues and publications, and was aimed at contributing to theological education and fostering understanding between Orthodox communities in Romania and the United States.

In 2017, under the guidance of Patriarch Daniel of Romania and with significant contributions from Buchiu, the "Patriarch Justinian" Faculty of Orthodox Theology at the University of Bucharest initiated an educational extension in Rome, Italy. This initiative was designed to meet the interest of the Romanian diaspora in pursuing Orthodox theological studies in their native language. Buchiu was instrumental in establishing this extension, which offers a curriculum similar to its parent institution in Bucharest, thereby facilitating theological education for Romanian Orthodox students living abroad.

==== Infrastructure and development ====
In 2015, the 'Patriarch Justinian' Faculty of Orthodox Theology added a new level to its building, increasing the number of classrooms and advancing the restoration of its century-old building. These developments, which occurred during Fr. Prof. Buchiu's tenure as dean, aimed to improve the faculty's infrastructure. His role in these projects was acknowledged with the Diploma of Honour of Saint Andrew the Apostle during the celebration of the 90th anniversary of the Romanian Orthodox Church's elevation to Patriarchate status.

== Theological contributions ==
Father Ștefan Buchiu has authored over 100 academic studies and articles in the field of Orthodox theology, engaging in theological discourse and exploring complex theological concepts.

=== Influence and legacy of Father Dumitru Stăniloae ===
Buchiu's theological work is significantly shaped by the teachings of Dumitru Stăniloae, a distinguished figure in Romanian Orthodox theology. As one who has closely studied under Stăniloae, Buchiu has extensively engaged with and built upon his mentor's theological concepts, underscoring their importance for both the Romanian Orthodox tradition and the broader Christian community.

In discussions on theological perspectives, Buchiu has highlighted Stăniloae's shift from theoretical academic study to a theology that is more experiential and personal. This approach emphasizes a direct and personal encounter with Christ, aiming to foster a living faith within the community of the Church.

Father Ștefan Buchiu contributed to honoring Father Dumitru Stăniloae's legacy through the "Rev. Academician Dumitru Staniloae" Theology Contest. This annual contest, targeting theological students, promotes the study of Stăniloae's theological works, encouraging a new generation to explore his profound contributions to Orthodox theology. For example, in 2015, the winners were recognized by the Patriarch of the Romanian Orthodox Church, highlighting Buchiu's role in connecting Staniloae's teachings with contemporary theological scholarship.

Prof. Buchiu's anthology, Father Dumitru Stăniloae, the Theologian of Divine Love gathers 20 articles that delve into Stăniloae's significant theological contributions. This collection not only highlights Buchiu's engagement with Stăniloae's theology but also its application to modern Christian life, promoting an experiential faith deeply rooted in the Holy Tradition of the Orthodox church.

On the 30th anniversary of Stăniloae's death, Buchiu underscored the ongoing relevance of his work for today's theological discourse and Orthodox practice. He encourages engagement with Stăniloae's writings as a pathway to deepen theological understanding and enhance faith practice, reflecting on Stăniloae's approach to theology that encompasses contemplation as well as social engagement.

=== Publications ===
==== Books ====
- Incarnation and Unity (Intrupare și unitate), 1997, ISBN 973-9016-50-2
- Orthodoxy and Secularization (Ortodoxie și secularizare), 1999 ISBN 973-9016-89-8
- Apophatic Knowledge in the Thought of Father Stăniloae (Cunoașterea apofatică în gândirea Părintelui Staniloae), 2002, ISBN 978-606-8495-30-9
- The Christian and Social Apostolate of the Romanian Orthodox Church, 1925–2005 (Apostolatul creștin și social al B.O.R. 1925–2005), co-author, 2005, ISBN 973-7737-45-8
- Dogma and Theology, Vol. I (Dogmă și Teologie, vol. I), 2006 ISBN 978-973-649-306-5
- Dogma and Theology, Vol. II (Dogmă și Teologie, vol. II), 2006 ISBN 978-973-649-309-6
- The Mother of God. An Introduction to Orthodox Theotokology (Maica Domnului. O introducere în teotokologia ortodoxă), 2006, ISBN 978-973-649-282-2
- Father Dumitru Stăniloae – The Theologian of Divine Love (Părintele Dumitru Stăniloae – teologul iubirii dumnezeiești), 2022, ISBN 978-606-29-0537-8

==== University courses coordinated ====
- Orthodox Dogmatic Theology vol. I (Teologia Dogmatică Ortodoxă vol. I), 2017, ISBN 978-606-29-0117-2
- Orthodox Dogmatic Theology vol. II (Teologia Dogmatică Ortodoxă vol. II), 2022, ISBN 978-606-29-0118-9
- Dictionary of Orthodox Theology (Dicționar de Teologie Ortodoxă, co-author), 2017, ISBN 978-606-29-0296-4

==== Edited volumes ====
- Research Methods in Dogmatic Theology (Metode de cercetare în Teologia Dogmatica), 2008, ISBN 978-973-649-550-2
- God the Father and the Life of the Most Holy Trinity (Dumnezeu-Tatăl și viața Preasfintei Treimi), 2010, ISBN 978-973-155-131-9
- The Mystery of Holy Unction and the Care of the Sick (Taina Sfântului Maslu și îngrijirea bolnavilor), 2012, ISBN 978-606-93171-8-1
- The Meanings and Importance of the Holy Mysteries of Confession and the Holy Mystery of Communion (Sensurile și importanța Sfintei Taine a Spovedaniei și ale Sfintei Taine a Împărtășaniei), 2015 ISBN 9786062900250
- Lights of the Centenary (Lumini de Centenar), 2018, ISBN 978-606-16-0999-4
- Thematic Guide on the Lectures of Courses for Clerical Degree II (Ghid tematic privind prelegerile cursurilor pentru Gradul II clerical), 2021, ISBN 978-606-9698-41-9

==== Selected works in international journals ====
- "La relation entre le Christ et l’Esprit Saint dans la theologie orthodoxe contemporaine," in Contacts, No. 222, April–June 2008, LX Année, pp. 103–116.
- "The Relationship Dogma-Theology according to Father Stăniloae," in Tradition and Dogma: What kind of Dogmatic Theology do we propose for nowadays?, Orthodox Dogmatic Theology Symposium 2nd International Edition, Universitatea "Aurel Vlaicu", Arad, 2009, pp. 34–46.
- "The Monarchy of the Father" (PDF). International Journal of Orthodox Theology. 1 (1): 98–110. 2010.
- "Le rôle et les limites de la raison dans la connaissance apophatique dans la pensée du Père Stăniloae," in The function and the limits of reason in dogmatic theology. I.A.O.D.T. Third International Symposium, Thessaloniki, 23 to 26 June 2011, Astra Museum, Sibiu, 2012, pp. 319–330.
- "La signification du terme Theotokos dans la théologie orthodoxe contemporaine," in Dogma and Terminology in the Orthodox Tradition Today, 4th International Symposium of Orthodox Dogmatic Theology, Sofia, 22–25 September 2013, Astra Museum, Sibiu, 2015, pp. 187–200.
- "La dimension christologique de l’escathologie orthodoxe et sa signification pour la théologie actuelle," Université de Balamand, Lebanon, 2018, 12 pp.

== Church roles and academic projects ==
=== Role in the re-establishment of the military chaplaincy in Romania ===
In 1994, Fr. Ștefan Buchiu was appointed by the Romanian Patriarchate to reinstate the chaplaincy service in the Romanian military, following the fall of the communist regime. This effort involved significant research and documentation, as the military chaplaincy had existed in Romania prior to the communist era. As part of this process, Fr. Buchiu participated in initiatives to study chaplaincy programs in other countries. This work marked a key step in restoring religious assistance within the Romanian armed forces, aiming to support the overall well-being and spiritual needs of military personnel.

== Awards and honors ==
He has received recognition both from academic institutions and the Church for his contributions to theology and higher education. For his commitment and exceptional contributions in the theological field, Fr. Ștefan Buchiu has received multiple distinctions and recognitions throughout his career.

=== Ecclesiastical, academic, and civic honors ===
- The Cross for Priests, awarded by Holiness Karekin I, Catholicos of the Armenians, Echmiadzin, Armenia, 1996
- Elevation to Archpriest, awarded by Patriarch Teoctist of Romania, 2005
- Honorary Citizen of Corbu, Olt County, since 2011
- President of the College of Deans of the Faculties of Orthodox Theology of the Romanian Patriarchate (2012–2018)
- The Order of Holy Great Sovereigns Constantine and Helen, 2017
- Vice President of the International Association of Orthodox Dogmatists, continuously serving since 2018, participating in various international conferences to contribute to the global Orthodox theological dialogue
- The title of emeritus professor conferred by the Senate of the University of Bucharest, 2018
- The rank of Honorary Diocesan Vicar granted by His Beatitude Patriarch Daniel of Romania, 2018
- Right to wear the Patriarchal Cross of Romania, the highest ecclesiastical distinction in the Romanian Orthodox Church, awarded by His Beatitude Patriarch Daniel of Romania
- The Order of Holy Brâncoveanu Martyrs, 2020
- The title of Doctor Honoris Causa awarded by the University of Craiova, 2022

=== Commemorative events ===
Prof. Buchiu's 70th birthday was marked by a commemorative event at the "Patriarch Justinian" Faculty of Orthodox Theology, University of Bucharest. This event celebrated the launch of a festschrift titled In the Light of Christ: Homage to Fr. Prof. Ștefan Buchiu, featuring contributions from academic scholars and ecclesiastical officials. Notably, Patriarch Daniel of Romania provided a foreword, stating:

"For over three decades, Father Professor Ștefan Buchiu has conducted an extensive teaching tenure... demonstrating considerable rigor, seriousness, and generosity. He has supported the development and recognition of multiple generations of theologians... [and] exemplifies diligence, enthusiasm, and selfless dedication to the welfare of the Church, thorough scholarship, and academic earnestness in the advancement of Romanian theological education."

The event was attended by bishops, prominent academics, and students, reinforcing the professor's esteemed standing in the theological academic community. Additional accolades included a blessing from Archbishop Casian Crăciun and the delivery of Patriarch Daniel's message by Vicar Bishop Timotei of Prahova.
