= Ruseni, Edineț =

Ruseni
- Commune
- Location in Moldova
- Coordinates: 48°12′6″N 27°24′57″E
- Country: Moldova
- District: Edineț District
- Elevation: 568 ft (173 m)

Population (2014)
  - Total: 2,121
- Time zone: UTC+2 (EET)
  - Summer (DST): UTC+3 (EEST)
- Postal code: MD-4639
- Area code: +373 246

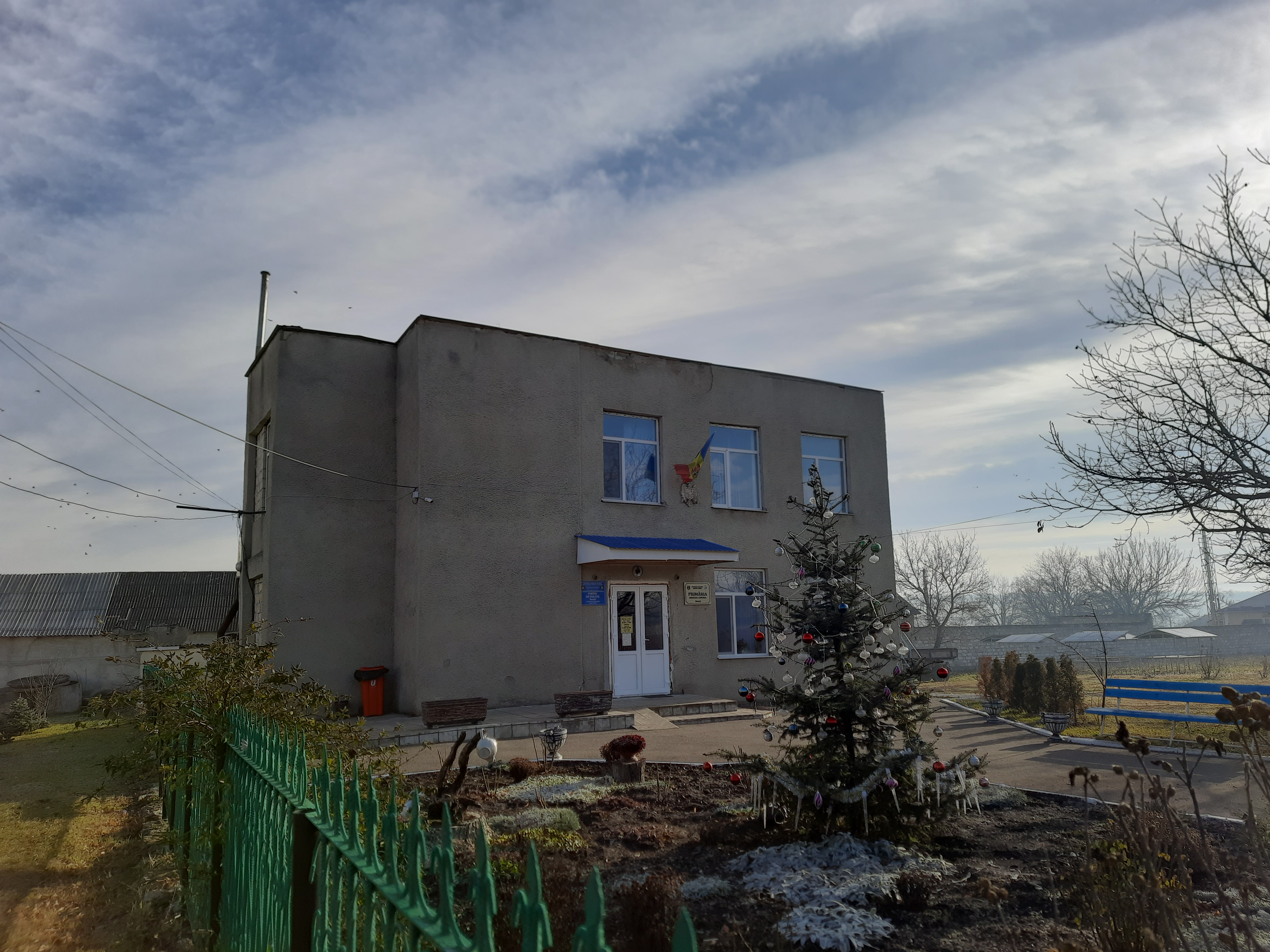
MD.ED.Ruseni

Ruseni is a commune in Edineț District, Moldova. It is composed of two villages, Ruseni and Slobodca.

== Notable people ==
- Anatol Ciobanu
