= Coșernița, Florești =

Coșernița
- Commune and village
- Location in Moldova
- Coordinates: 47°56′17″N 28°27′52″E
- Country: Moldova
- District: Florești District

Population (2014 census)
  - Total: 1,551
- Time zone: UTC+2 (EET)
  - Summer (DST): UTC+3 (EEST)
- Postal code: MD-5017
- Area code: +373 250

Coșernița is a village in Florești District, Moldova.

== Notable people ==
- Alexandru Leșco
