= Păpăuți, Rezina =

Păpăuți
- Village
- Location within Moldova
- Coordinates: 47.7977777778°N 28.9230555556°E
- Country: Moldova
- District: Rezina District

Government
  - Mayor: Oleg Stoler (PLDM)

Population (2014 census)
  - Total: 1,318
- Time zone: UTC+2 (EET)
  - Summer (DST): UTC+3 (EEST)

Păpăuți is a village in Rezina District, Moldova.

== Natives ==
- Filimon Săteanu, poet
