= Țiganca =

- Commune
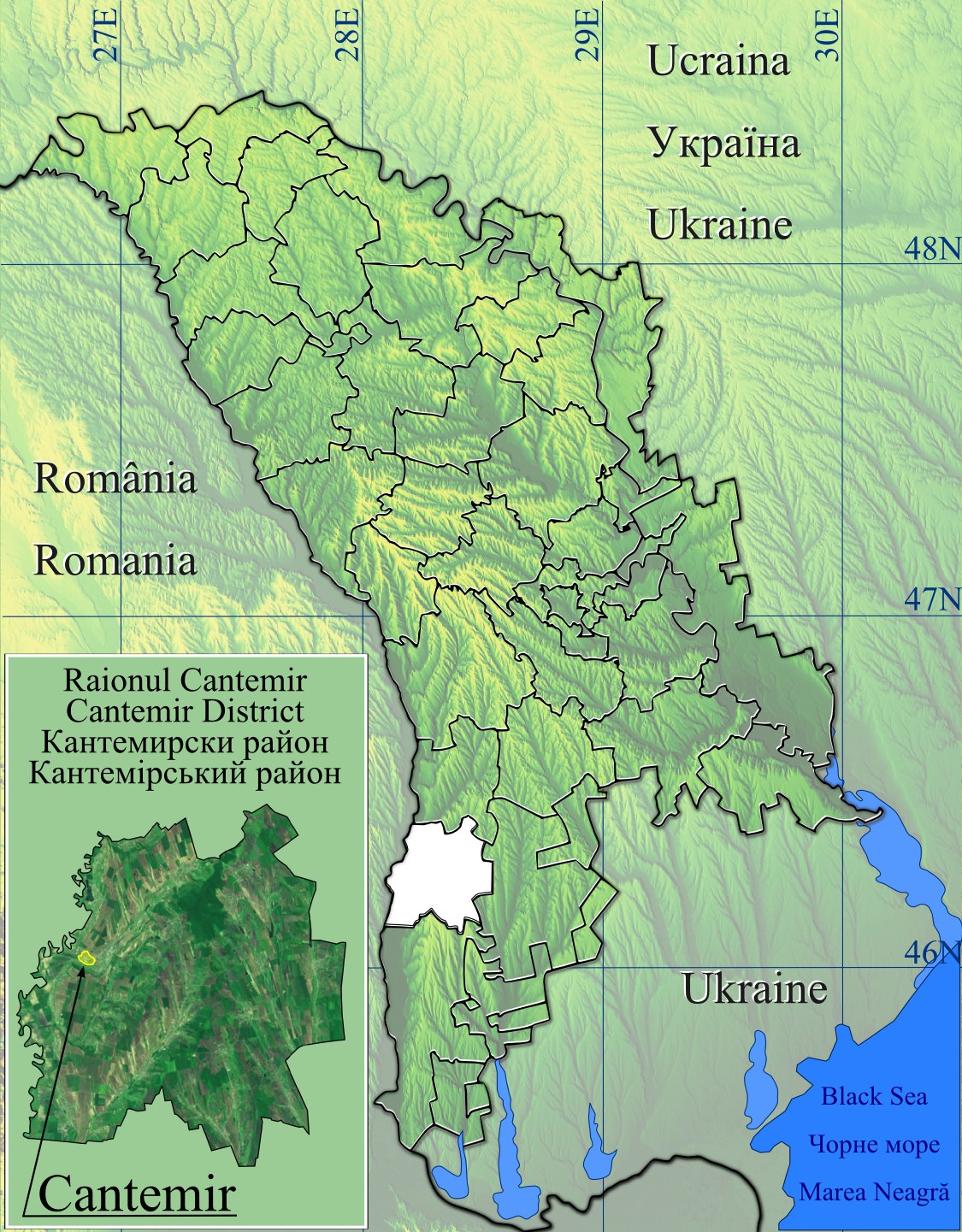
- Location in Moldova
- Coordinates: 46°14′N 28°09′E
- Country: Moldova
- District: Cantemir District

Population (2014)
  - Total: 2,596
- Time zone: UTC+2 (EET)
  - Summer (DST): UTC+3 (EEST)

Țiganca is a commune in Cantemir District, Moldova. It is composed of three villages: Ghioltosu, Țiganca and Țiganca Nouă.

A cemetery of the Romanian soldiers fallen in 1941 during the military offensive to retake Bessarabia is located in Țiganca.

== Notable people ==
- Nina Josu (born 1953), writer and activist
- Petru Păduraru (born 1946), priest and the current Metropolitan of Bessarabia
