= Codreni, Cimișlia =

Codreni
- Commune and village
- Location in Moldova
- Coordinates: 46°40′N 28°53′E
- Country: Moldova
- District: Cimișlia District

Area
  - Total: 4.94 sq mi (12.80 km^{2})

Population (2014)
  - Total: 639
  - Density: 129/sq mi (49.9/km^{2})
- Time zone: UTC+2 (EET)
  - Summer (DST): UTC+3 (EEST)

Codreni is a village in Cimișlia District, Moldova, about 30 km (19 mi) to the south of Chișinău. It is composed of two villages, Codreni and Zloți station.

== History ==
Valeriu Săînu became mayor after the 2007 local elections.

== Notable people ==
- Nicolae Dabija, writer and politician
