= Mihai Cimpoi =

Moldovan politician (born 1942)

Mihai Cimpoi OR
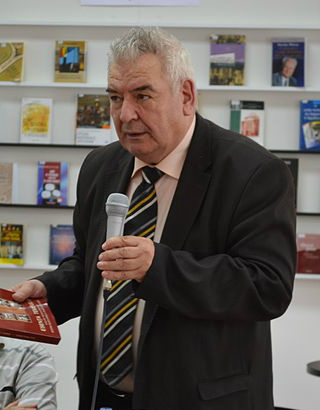
- Cimpoi in 2010

Member of the Moldovan Parliament
- In office 5 May 2009 – 29 July 2009
- Parliamentary group: Our Moldova Alliance
- In office 21 April 1998 – 20 March 2001
- Parliamentary group: Democratic Convention

People's Deputy of the Soviet Union
- In office 26 March 1989 – 18 October 1991
- Constituency: Chișinău

Personal details
- Born: 3 September 1942 (age 84) Larga, Kingdom of Romania
- Party: Alliance Our Moldova; Alliance for European Integration (2009–present)
- Other political affiliations: Popular Front of Moldova
- Education: Moldova State University

Mihai Cimpoi (born 3 September 1942) is a Moldovan politician, a distinguished cultural scientist, Romanian academician, critic and literary historian, expert on Mihai Eminescu, literary editor and Bessarabian essayist. "Emeritus of the Republic of Moldova", two decades elected president of the Union of Writers of Moldova, deputy in the Parliament of the Republic of Moldova between 1999 and 2001, Mihai Cimpoi is the author of some fundamental works such as: "An Open History of the Romanian literature in Bessarabia" (in several editions) and "Mihai Eminescu. Encyclopedic Dictionary" - a unique monumental work. Cimpoi is the author and developer of the long-term project "The World Congress of Eminescologists", launched in 2012 and became a tradition.

== Biography ==
Mihai Cimpoi was born on 3 September 1942 into the family of Ilie and Ana Cimpoi, peasants from the commune of Larga, Hotin County, Kingdom of Romania. The future academician, after primary and secondary education, graduated from the Faculty of Philology from Chișinău (1965), after which he became the editor of the magazine "Nistru" (until 1972) and a consultant of the Union of Writers. In 1973, his signature and public activity are forbidden, because he "dared" to address the aesthetic critique of the Călinescian origin instead of the official, sociologistic.

He was a member of the Parliament of Moldova. He is a leader of the Democratic Forum of Romanians in Moldova.

== Activity ==
He is employed as editor at the "Moldovan Book" (1974) and "Artistic Literature" (1977-1982), literary secretary at the National Theater (1982-1983) and Lyric Theater "Alexei Mateevici"(1986-1987). Since May 1987 he has been elected secretary of the Steering Committee of the Writers' Union of Moldova and president since September 1991 until 2010. He was deputy of the people of the USSR in Gorbachev's thaw (1989-1990) and then deputy in the Parliament of the Republic of Moldova (1999-2001). In parallel, he is the head of the Department of Classical Literature of the Institute of History and Literary Theory of the Academy of Sciences of Moldova, he obtained his Ph.D. in Philology in 1998, with the thesis "Eminescu, poet of Being" (conductor, Eugen Simion) and teaches at the "Ion Creangă" Pedagogical University in Chişinău. In 1991 he became an honorary member of the Romanian Academy, a member of the Academy of Sciences of Moldova (1992), a member of the Writers' Union of Romania (since 1994 elected and member of the board of directors), member of PEN-club, member of the Târgoviştei Writers Society (2005), vice-president of the Cultural League for the Unity of Romanians Abroad, an honorary citizen of Craiova (in 2005, alongside Grigore Vieru, Vasile Tărâţeanu). He is the director of the magazine "Life of Basarabia" and in the collections of publications "Critical copybooks", "Romanian Life", founding president of the "Mihai Eminescu" International Academic Center in Chișinău.

== Affiliations ==
- Honorary member of the Romanian Academy, 1991
- Member of the Academy of Sciences of Moldova, 1992
- Member of Writers Union of Romania
- Member of the World Writers' Organization

== Honorary titles ==
- Doctor honoris Causa of the Tiraspol State University
