= Petrograd formula =

Bolshevik Peace Formula for the First World War

The Petrograd formula was a Peace Formula constructed by the Bolshevik party after their Revolution in November 1917. The Bolsheviks did not want Russia to participate in the first World War. After the interception of the Miliukov note, the Petrograd Soviet issued the Petrograd Formula in May declaring peace with "no annexations and no indemnities" and on the basis of the self-determination of peoples.
