= Taxobeni =

- Commune
- Location in Moldova
- Coordinates: 47°23′25″N 27°35′30″E
- Country: Moldova
- District: Fălești District

Population (2014)
  - Total: 1,483
- Time zone: UTC+2 (EET)
  - Summer (DST): UTC+3 (EEST)

Taxobeni is a commune in Fălești District, Moldova. It is composed of three villages: Hrubna Nouă, Taxobeni and Vrănești.

Coordinates: approximately 47.3902° N latitude, 27.5916° E longitude.

Elevation: ~ 61 meters above sea level.

Distance: about 22 km from the district center of Fălești, and approx. 146 km from Moldova’s capital, Chișinău.

Population: According to the 2014 census, the total population of the commune was 1,483 people.

== Notable people ==
- Ilie Ilașcu
