= Alexandru Leșco =

Moldovan activist

Alexandru Leșco OR
- Born: February 21, 1955 (age 71); Coşerniţa, Floreşti, Soviet Union
- Known for: detention
- Awards: Order of the Star of Romania

Alexandru Leșco (born 21 February 1955) is a Moldovan activist, famous for being sentenced by the separatist Transnistrian government for actions which have been described as Moldovan state-sponsored terrorism by Transnistrian government officials. According to European Court of Human Rights, it was an unlawful sentence.

== Biography ==
Alexandru Leșco and the other members of the "Tiraspol Six" were convicted on December 9, 1993, of "terrorist acts". Alexandru Leșco was released only on June 2, 2004.

In July 2005 the European Court of Human Rights ruled that both Moldova and the Russian Federation were responsible for the unlawful detention and torture and ill-treatment suffered by Ilie Ilașcu, Alexandru Leșco, Andrei Ivanțoc, and Tudor Petrov-Popa. His lawyer was Alexandru Tănase.

Alexandru Leșco is a leader of the Democratic Forum of Romanians in Moldova.

== Awards ==
- Order of the Star of Romania, 2000.
