= Nicolae Dabija (writer) =

Moldovan writer (1948–2021)

Nicolae Dabija OR
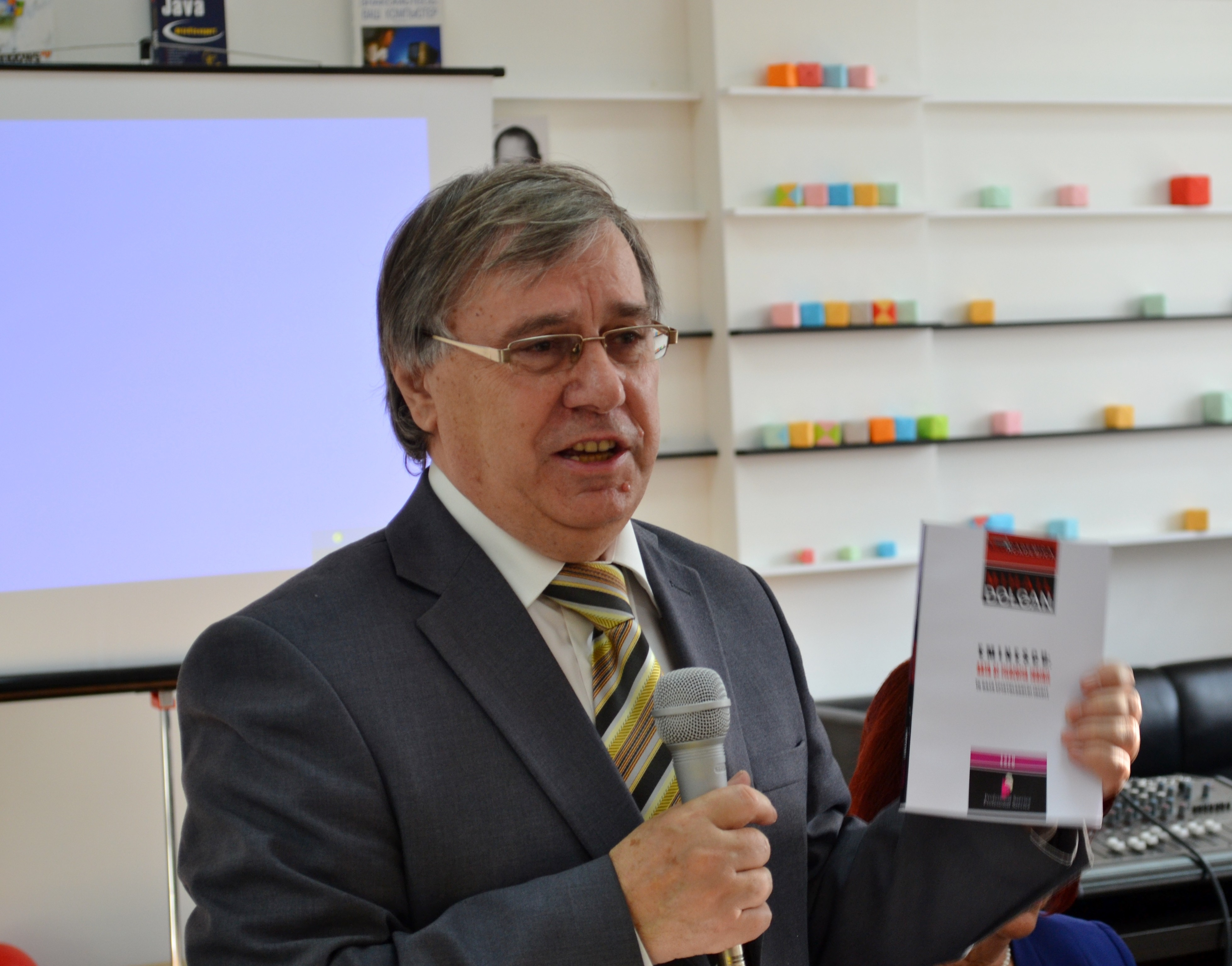
- Dabija in 2013

Member of the Moldovan Parliament
- In office 22 March 1998 – 20 March 2001
- Parliamentary group: Party of Democratic Forces
- In office 17 April 1990 – 29 March 1994
- Parliamentary group: Popular Front
- Constituency: Căinari

People's Deputy of the Soviet Union
- In office 26 March 1989 – 17 April 1990
- Constituency: Orhei

Personal details
- Born: 15 July 1948 Codreni, Moldavian SSR, Soviet Union
- Died: 12 March 2021 (aged 72) Chișinău, Moldova
- Resting place: Central Cemetery, Chișinău
- Party: Popular Front of Moldova
- Education: Moldova State University
- Profession: Writer, literary historian
- Awards: Order of the Star of Romania, Commander rank

Nicolae Dabija (15 July 1948 – 12 March 2021) was a writer, literary historian, and politician from the Republic of Moldova, honorary member of the Romanian Academy (from 2003) and corresponding member of the Academy of Sciences of Moldova (from 2012).

== Biography ==
Dabija was born on 15 July 1948 in Codreni village, Cimișlia, at the time in the Moldavian SSR of the Soviet Union. Of Romanian nationality and Orthodox religion, he was the nephew of the archimandrite Serafim Dabija, a Romanian confessor deported to a Gulag camp in 1947.

In 1966 he enrolled at the journalism faculty of the State University of Moldova. In the third year he was expelled for "pro-Romanian and anti-Soviet activity"; re-admitted in 1970 in the Faculty of Philology, he graduated from the university in 1972.

Dabija published over 80 titles of poetry, narration and essays. He debuted in 1975 with "The Third Eye", a poetry volume. Other titles include: "Untouched Water" (1980); "The Unknown Painter" (1985); "Wing under the Shirt" (1989); "Domestic Blackbird" (1992); "The Right on the Error" (1993); "The Tears that can see" (1994); "The Stone Egg" (1995); "The Interior Sky" (1998); "The Lightning Photographer", (1998); "The Homework" (novel; 2009); and "Wishes Handyman" (2016).

Starting with 1986, he was the editor-in-chief of the weekly Literatura și Arta (Literature and Art) edited by the Union of Writers of the Republic of Moldova. In its glory period, the weekly "Literature and Art" exceeded the circulation of 260,000 copies, and played an important role in the struggle for national rebirth in Moldova in the late 1980s.

Dabija was the recipient of several national rewards, including the National Award of the Republic of Moldova (1988, 2011), the "Nichita Stănescu" award (1992), the "Lucian Blaga" award (1993), and the "Mihai Eminescu" poetry award of the Romanian Academy (1995). In 2000 he was awarded the Order of the Star of Romania, with the rank of Commander. He was President of the Association of Science People, Culture and Art, member of The Academy of Science of Republic of Moldova, and Honorary member of the Academy of Science of Romania.

Dabija died on 12 March 2021, of COVID-19 during the COVID-19 pandemic in Moldova and was buried at the Chișinău Central Cemetery.

== Political activity ==
In 1988, Nicolae Dabija was a member of the Initiative Group for the Creation of the Popular Front of Moldova and member of the People's Front Council. Between 1989 and 1991 he was a deputy in the Supreme Soviet of Moldavian SSR. He continued to be a deputy of the Parliament of the Republic of Moldova in 1990–1994 and 1998–2001.

In 1993 and 1994 he was co-chair of the Congress of Intellectuality of the Republic of Moldova and in 1998–2001 he was the representative of the Parliament of the Republic of Moldova in the Parliamentary Assembly from the Black Sea Basin. He became Deputy Chairman of the Party of Democratic Forces in 1994, and later of the Social-Liberal Party until 2002. In 2005 he was elected President of the Democratic Forum of Romanians in Moldova, a non-governmental organization of culture and law, to which more than 150 cultural organizations, creation unions, non-governmental associations joined. From 2016 he was also the President of the Movement "Sfatul Țării-2", a non-governmental association that proposed the unification of the Romanian nation.

== Memory ==
In 2023, on the territory of the Regional Museum of History, Ethnography and Art of Cimislia, the Moldovan sculptor Veaceslav Jiglițchi will install a bust of the poet.

In 2026, a bust of Academician Nicolae Dabija was unveiled in his native village of Codreni, Cimișlia District. Created by sculptor Veaceslav Jiglițchi, the monument was donated by AESPN and SMV Ploiești.

== Legacy ==
=== Monuments ===
In 2026, a bust of Academician Nicolae Dabija was unveiled in his native village of Codreni, Cimișlia District. Created by sculptor Veaceslav Jiglițchi, the monument was donated by AESPN and SMV Ploiești.
