= Cepeleuți =

- Commune
- Location in Moldova
- Coordinates: 48°18′N 27°18′E
- Country: Moldova
- District: Edineț District

Population (2014)
  - Total: 1,239
- Time zone: UTC+2 (EET)
  - Summer (DST): UTC+3 (EEST)

Cepeleuți is a commune in Edineț District, Moldova. It is composed of three villages: Cepeleuți, Rîngaci and Vancicăuți.

== Notable people ==
- Victor Teleucă
- Nicolae Lupan
- Gheorghe Ciocoi
- Ion Morei
