= Association of Historians of Moldova =

- Asociaţia Istoricilor din Republica Moldova
- Founded: June 18, 1989; 36 years ago
- Headquarters: Chişinău
- Location: Moldova
- Key people: Sergiu Musteaţă
- Website: airm.reg.md

The Association of Historians of Moldova (Romanian: Asociaţia Istoricilor din Republica Moldova) is a professional association of historians in Moldova.

== Overview ==
The Association of Historians of Moldova was formed on June 18, 1989; Pavel Parasca was the first president.

Sergiu Musteaţă is the president of the association. The leadership is formed by Ion Negrei, Gheorghe Postică, Anatol Petrencu, Gheorghe Palade, Gheorghe Negru, Demir Dragnev, Daniela Buga, Maria Danilov, Igor Cașu, Mihai Taşcă, Viorica Negrei, Gheorghe E. Cojocaru.
