= Andrei Ivanțoc =

Moldovan politician

Andrei Ivanțoc OR

Personal details
- Born: 9 March 1961 (age 65) Opaci, Căușeni district, Soviet Union
- Party: Christian-Democratic People's Party

Andrei Ivanțoc (born 9 March 1961) is a Moldovan politician. He was among the four leaders (the Ilie Ilașcu group, comprising also Alexandru Leșco and Tudor Petrov Popa) of the Tiraspol branch of the pro-Romanian Christian-Democratic People's Party of Moldova who were accused of terrorism by the authorities of the breakaway Pridnestrovian Moldavian Republic (PMR).

== Biography ==
Ivanțoc was born in Opaci, Căușeni district, Moldova. He and his three fellow-leaders were pro-Romanian unionists, fighting the PMR authorities who controlled most of Transnistria. Ivanțoc was arrested on 2 June 1992, and sentenced to 15 years of prison in a trial, which the European Court of Human Rights considered to be unfairly conducted by the PMR authorities. On 9 December 1993, the Supreme Court of the PMR found Ivanțoc guilty of murdering a representative of the State with the aim of spreading terror, unauthorised use and theft of ammunition or explosives, and assault. He was set free on 2 June 2007. He was maltreated and beaten by the "separatist police" in front of the OSCE members at custom.

In 2004 the OSCE and the European Court of Human Rights in Strasbourg have ruled that the PMR and Russia should end his detention as well as the detention of the other inmates still held by the PMR authorities.

Ivanțoc became a Romanian citizen in 2001 while in prison, and in March 2005, he was proposed by the Social Liberal Party as a candidate for the position of President of Moldova. On 27 February 2006, he started a hunger strike in protest against the "abusive, inhuman and degrading treatment" he was receiving from the PMR authorities.

On June 2, 2007 Ivanțoc was released by the PMR authorities, after pressures of the international community. After he was released he tried to reenter PMR-controlled territory without permission and was captured and beaten by the PMR security forces, then forced to leave the PMR and declared persona non-grata.

He is a leader of the Democratic Forum of Romanians in Moldova.

== Video ==
- (in Romanian) Interview with Ivanţoc after his release
- (in Romanian) Video showing the incidents on Andrei Ivanţoc release
