= Literatura și Arta =

Literatura şi Arta
- Founder: Victor Teleucă
- Editor-in-chief: Nicolae Dabija
- Founded: 1977
- Language: Romanian
- Headquarters: Chişinău
- Website: Officialwebsite

Literatura şi Arta (Romanian for "Literature and Art") is a weekly newspaper from Chişinău, Moldova.

== History ==
The first edition was printed in 1977. The first editor in chief was Victor Teleucă (1977–1983), Valeriu Senic (1983–1986). Among the authors were: Dinu Mihail, Mircea Blajinu, Vlad Zbârciog, Mihail Ion Cibotaru, Iacob Burghiu, Iulian Nicuţă, Eugen Gheorghiţă, Haralambie Moraru, Ion Caţaveică.

Nicolae Dabija has been the editor in chief of Literatura şi Arta since 1986.
