= Ilie Ilașcu =

Moldovan politician (1952–2025)

Ilie Ilașcu OR
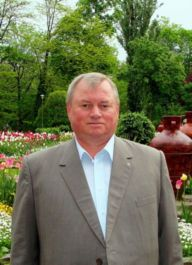
- Ilașcu in 2009

Member of the Senate of Romania
- In office 26 November 2000 – 30 November 2008
- Parliamentary group: Greater Romania Party
- Constituency: Bacău

Member of the Moldovan Parliament
- In office 27 February 1994 – 26 November 2000
- Succeeded by: Grigore Manole
- Parliamentary group: Christian-Democratic People's Party

Personal details
- Born: 30 July 1952 Taxobeni, Moldavian SSR, Soviet Union
- Died: 17 November 2025 (aged 73) Bucharest, Romania
- Party: Popular Front of Moldova; Democratic Christian Popular Front; Party of Democratic Forces; Greater Romania Party
- Spouse: Nina
- Children: 2
- Education: Faculty of Economic Studies of the Agricultural Institute in Chișinău
- Awards: Order of the Star of Romania; Order of the Republic (Moldova)

Ilie Ilașcu (30 July 1952 – 17 November 2025) was a Moldovan and Romanian politician, especially known for being sentenced to death by the separatist Transnistrian government for alleged involvement in two murders and for actions which have been described as Moldovan state-sponsored terrorism by Transnistrian government officials.

== Political activity ==
Born in Taxobeni, Fălești District, Ilașcu graduated from the Faculty of Economic Studies of the Agricultural Institute in Chișinău. He was married to Nina and they had two daughters, Tatiana (b. 28 February 1980) and Olga (b. 1 July 1984).

Ilie Ilașcu worked as chief economist at "Dnestr" Research Institute in Tiraspol. Ilașcu became known for his opposition to Moldovan Communist Party politics regarding the Moldovan language, for openly advocating the usage of Latin script and for recognition of a Moldovan-Romanian identity, as well as for giving Moldovan the status of an official language.

His opponents nicknamed him "glavnii extremist" (chief extremist) instead of "glavnii economist" (chief economist). In January 1989, he was one of the founders of a Moldovan association in Tiraspol. On 9 July 1989, he was arrested for the first time, being released with excuses after few days. Also in 1989, he was dismissed from his job but was able to regain his position after appealing to the prosecutor office. On 5 September 1989, as he spoke at a meeting in Tiraspol in favour of the language laws passed by the Moldovan parliament, he was taken away by policemen, who needed to protect him from the crowd of political opponents.

Starting with 1989, he was the president of the Tiraspol branch of the Moldovan Popular Front, which advocated the union of Moldova and Romania.

He was a leader of the Democratic Forum of Romanians in Moldova. In 2010, Ilașcu announced he will support Mihai Ghimpu and the Liberal Party.

== The Ilașcu group trial ==
On 2 June 1992, he and three more ethnic Romanians (Andrei Ivanțoc, Alexandru Leșco and Tudor Petrov Popa) were arrested by GRU for the breakaway Transnistrian government and charged with the murder of two separatist officials.

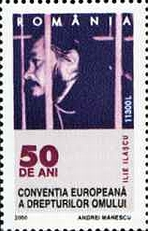
Ilie Ilașcu represented on a Romanian stamp about Human rights

On 9 December 1993, the Supreme Court of Transnistria found him guilty of a number of offences defined in the Criminal Code of the Moldovan Soviet Socialist Republic, including incitement to commit an offence against national security, organisation of activities with the aim of committing extremely dangerous offences against the State, murdering a representative of the State with the aim of spreading terror, premeditated murder, unlawfully requisitioning means of transport, deliberate destruction of another's property and illegal or unauthorised use of ammunition or explosives.

Ilașcu was sentenced to be shot and the other three defendants were sentenced to hard labour for terms between 12 and 15 years. They had no right of appeal.

During the trial, the political prisoners were kept in reinforced iron cages, as they were considered "extremely dangerous". This decision was contested by various international human rights organizations, which doubted the fairness of the trial and alleged that they were prosecuted only because they were members of the Tiraspol branch of the Popular Front, a Moldovan party which favours a union with Romania. For years he was kept in solitary confinement without access to family and medical assistance.

While in the Transnistrian prison, Ilașcu was elected twice to the Moldovan Parliament on the lists of the Democratic Christian Popular Front, in 1994 and 1998 election.

In October 2000, he received Romanian citizenship, after which he renounced his Moldovan citizenship. In the same year, he was elected to the Senate of Romania for the Greater Romania Party, representing Bacău County. Reelected in 2004, Ilașcu served as a member of the Senate until 2008.

== Ilașcu and Others v. Moldova and Russia ==
The European Court of Human Rights judged in 2004 that the authorities had infringed the human rights (as defined by the European Convention on Human Rights) of Ilie Ilașcu and the other three people arrested by the Transnistrian government. The ruling came after a legal process that began in 1999. The court ruled that the Supreme Court of the PMR was not an actual court with any jurisdiction over the detainees, and its findings that led to their conviction were not considered. Under the court's decision, Russia was to pay Ilașcu 187,000 euros. Alexandru Tănase was a lawyer for Ilașcu.

== Release ==
Ilașcu was eventually released on 5 May 2001, two years after he filed an application with the European Court of Human Rights and following a verdict of the European Court of Human Rights, where he had sued both Russia and Moldova.

The other three members of the group were released as follows:

- Andrei Ivanțoc – 2 June 2007
- Alexandru Leșco – 2 June 2004
- Tudor Petrov-Popa – 4 June 2007

Russian authorities denied any involvement in the affair.

== Death ==
Ilașcu died in Bucharest on 17 November 2025, at the age of 73. He was buried in the Bellu Cemetery with military honors.

== Awards ==
- Order of the Star of Romania, 2001
- Order of the Republic (Moldova), 2010
