= Tudor Petrov-Popa =

Tudor Petrov-Popa OR

Personal details
- Born: 1963 (age 62–63)

Tudor Petrov-Popa (born 1963) is a Moldovan-born Romanian politician, arrested in Tiraspol in June 1992 by the Transnistrian separatists.

== Biography ==
Petrov-Popa was a Soviet army veteran of the war in Afghanistan who was convicted together with four other men in the so-called Ilașcu Group for acts of terrorism including assassination by the separatist authorities of Transnistria. The trials in 1993 were considered by many human rights groups as unfair and lacking in due process. Adding to this impression were the clearly political aspects, in that Petrov-Popa and Ivanţoc as well as the others were Romanian unionists.

On 9 December 1993, the Supreme Court of Transnistria found him guilty of murdering a representative of the State with the aim of spreading terror, unauthorised use and theft of ammunition or explosives, and assault. He was sentenced to 15 years in prison.

All members of the Ilașcu Group are believed to have been tortured, subjected to mock executions, psychotropic substances, and forced to sign confessions.

Petrov-Popa, Ivanţoc and the others of their group were Romanian unionists who campaigned for unification of Romania and Moldova.

In 2004 the European Court of Human Rights ruled that Moldova and Russia should end his detention as well as the detention of the other political hostages in Transnistria, but the Transnistrian authorities did not comply. He was finally released on June 4, 2007.

He is a leader of the Democratic Forum of Romanians in Moldova.
