= 1990 Moldavian Supreme Soviet election =

- February–March 1990
- All 380 seats in Supreme Soviet; 191 seats needed for a majority
Chairmen of the Presidium of the Supreme Soviet before	Chairmen of the Supreme Council after
Mircea Snegur; PCM	Mircea Snegur; Independent

Parliamentary elections were held in the Moldavian SSR in February and March 1990 to elect the 380 members of the Supreme Soviet. They were the first and only free elections to the Supreme Soviet of the MSSR. Although the Communist Party of Moldova was the only registered party allowed to contest the elections, opposition candidates were allowed to run as independents. Together with affiliated groups, the Popular Front of Moldova won a landslide victory. Candidates who were openly supporters of the Popular Front won about 27% of the seats; together with moderate Communists, mainly from rural districts, they commanded a majority.

On 5 June the Supreme Soviet renamed the Moldavian SSR the "Soviet Socialist Republic of Moldova" and issued a Declaration of Sovereignty on 23 June. It subsequently removed references to socialism and soviets on 23 May 1991 by adopting the name "Republic of Moldova", and declared full independence from the Soviet Union on 27 August 1991. The next legislature was elected as the Parliament of Moldova in 1994.

== Results ==
All 380 deputies were elected in uninominal constituencies. The first sitting of the parliament was held on April 17, 1990.

== Elected MPs ==
1. Andrei Baştovoi
2. Anatol Salaru
3. Victor Pavlic
4. Ilie Mocanu
5. Vasile Gudima
6. Andrei Ţurcanu
7. Mihai Poiata
8. Nicolae Robu
9. Vasile Nedelciuc
10. Alexandru Mosanu
11. Ion Popa
12. Constantin Culea
13. Gheorghe Carlan
14. Mihai Sâromatnicov
15. Valeriu Cibotaru
16. Valentin Mândâcanu
17. Titu Serghei
18. Pavel Lupăcescu
19. Mihai Bejan
20. Dumitru Guţu
21. Jorj Crisico
22. Mihai Străjescu
23. Vitalie Ustroi
24. Dumitru Cereş
25. Anatol Ivanov
26. Peter Soltan
27. Alexandru Gorodnicenco
28. Iurie Maxuta
29. Vladimir Dobrea
30. Nicolae Grosu
31. Nicolae Alexei
32. Ion Eremia
33. Dumitru Braşoveanu
34. Elisei Secrieru
35. Vlad Pascaru
36. Teodor Macrinici
37. Vasile Pruteanu
38. Dumitru Cernei
39. Nicolae Domente
40. Gheorghe Bogdanov
41. Iurie Timoshenco
42. Vasile Basoc
43. Ion Borsevici
44. Anton Spanu
45. Tudor Lefter
46. Andrei Munteanu
47. Gheorghe Siumbeli
48. Gheorghe Nechit
49. Dumitru Holban
50. Grigore Cusnir
51. Gheorghe Răducan
52. Fiodor Nirean
53. Sergiu Fandofan
54. Ion Tacu
55. Mihai Scutaru
56. Mihai Ciorici
57. Ilarion Guidea
58. Ion Scutaru
59. Mihai Lazar
60. Nicolae Misail
61. Ion Tanas (Chisinau)
62. Vasile Para
63. Valeriu Jardan
64. Alexandru Ohotnicov
65. Valentin Colun
66. Semion Guranda
67. Sergiu Argatu
68. Vasile Şova
69. Victor Reabcici
70. Valentin Nicolaenco
71. Ion Negură
72. Nicolae Stadinciuc
73. Tudor Mogăldea
74. Nicolae Malachi
75. Vasile Vartic
76. Nicolae Todos
77. Alexandru Arseni
78. Mihai Cotorobai
79. Spiridon Martâniuc
80. Dumitru Grosu
81. Nicolae Moraru
82. Mihai Druţă
83. Vasile Şevcenco
84. Gheorghe Amihalachioaie
85. Evgheni Berdnikov
86. Yuri Atamanenko
87. Ion Rusu
88. Ludmila Laşcionova
89. Pavel Gusac
90. Dumitru Moţpan
91. Vasile Domente
92. Danil Matcin
93. Mihail Popovici
94. Ion Ciuntu
95. Valentin Krilov
96. Vladimir Solonari
97. Anatol Rusanov
98. Ion Novac
99. Ion Mărgineanu
100. Aurel Saulea
101. Ananie Badan
102. Valerian Gherman
103. Afanasie Chechiu
104. Ion Madan
105. Lidia Istrati
106. Elena Balan
107. Olga Ojoga
108. Dumitru Noroc
109. Ion Prisăcaru
110. Ion Stepanenco
111. Valeriu Lebedev
112. Victor Tocan
113. Nicolae Proca
114. Constantin Bogdan
115. Ion Butnaru
116. Ion Neagu
117. Gheorghe Beliciuc
118. Dumitru Postovan
119. Stepan Plaţinda
120. Ion Chiriac
121. Petru Tărâţă
122. Vladimir Carauş
123. Grigore Cuşmăunsă
124. Ion Palii
125. Călin Botica
126. Valeriu Obreja
127. Sergei Popa
128. Gavril Frangu
129. Mihai Rusu
130. Sergiu Manea
131. Ion Ţurcan
132. Anatol Zelenschi
133. Ludmila Scalnâi
134. Anatol Saragov
135. Eugen Popusoi
136. Grigore Bordeianu
137. Anatol Chiriac
138. Ilia Trombiţki
139. Vladimir Agachi
140. Piotr Şornikov
141. Vitalie Zavgorodni
142. Gheorghe Hioară
143. Victor Berlinschi
144. Anatol Ivanov
145. Vasile Nestor
146. Sergiu Coşceev
147. Marin Beleuţă
148. Valentin Dolganiuc
149. Petru Poita
150. Gheorghe Slabu
151. Dumitru Postovan
152. Ion Lapaci
153. Victor Puşcaş
154. Ion Buga
155. Pantelei Pârvan
156. Alecu Renita
157. Iacob Negru
158. Ion Popov
159. Petru Lucinschi
160. Constantin Tănase
161. Gheorghe Trestianu
162. Valentin Lefter
163. Mihai Dimitriu
164. Petru Muntean
165. Ion Ungureanu
166. Ion Cojocaru
167. Valeriu Serjant
168. Gheorghe Mazilu (-2004)
169. Vasile Ursachi
170. Iovu Bivol
171. Petru Griciuc
172. Andrei Cubasov
173. Vasile Costov
174. Constantin Sahanovschi
175. Sergiu Chircă
176. Petru Chimirciuc
177. Alexandru Buruian
178. Zosim Bodiu
179. Mihai Musumanschi
180. Svetlana Mâsliţcaia
181. Mihai Plasiciuc
182. Andrei Cabac
183. Nicolae Dabija
184. Tudor Olaru
185. Anton Terente
186. Petru Caterev
187. Ion Munteanu
188. Semion Gurghis
189. Ştefan Maimescu
190. Gheorghe Scutaru
191. Vladimir Gudumac
192. Serafim Urecheanu
193. Tudor Angheli
194. Vladimir Iuzvenco
195. Victor Morev
196. Vitalie Pritula
197. Andrei Diaconu
198. Constantin Ţurcan
199. Fiodor Carapunarl
200. Constantin Capsamun
201. Constantin Tauşanji
202. Dumitru Puntea
203. Ion Batcu
204. Stepan Curoglo
205. Grigore Bratunov
206. Alexandru Snegur
207. Pavel Dubălari
208. Stepan Curtev
209. Vasile Cojocaru
210. Valeriu Bulgari
211. Nadejda Brânzan
212. Anatol Conoplin
213. Vasile Iovv
214. Vladimir Capanji
215. Boris Aculov
216. Ghimn Pologov
217. Grigore Volovoi
218. Mihail Catcov
219. Larisa Pokotilova
220. Mihai Coscodan
221. Gheorghe Grosu
222. Nicolae Andronatii
223. Nicolae Andronic
224. Victor Arestov
225. Vasile Baboi
226. Semion Badrajan
227. Pavel Bejenuţă
228. Anatol Belitcenco
229. Vladimir Beşleaga
230. Tudor Bobescu
231. Stepan Bogacenco
232. Nicolai Bogdanov
233. Anatoly Bolsakov
234. Vladimir Bondarenco
235. Ilie Bratu
236. Petru Braşoveanu
237. Boris Briziţchi
238. Peter Bodorin
239. Aleksandr Bulîcev
240. Valentin Burduja
241. Alexandru But
242. Boris Carandiuc
243. Petru Carauş
244. Nadejda Cegurco
245. Valdemar Cirt
246. Valentin Cicikin
247. Vitalie Ciorap
248. Gheorghe Ciorba
249. Mihail Kendighelean
250. Gheorghe Ciobanu
251. Ivan Cior
252. Anatol Chişner
253. Mihail Codin
254. Vladlen Colesov
255. Anatol Coleghin
256. Victor Constantinov
257. Ion Costaş
258. Nicolae Costin
259. Ilie Cosanu
260. Dumitru Cretu
261. Dumitru Croitor
262. Valentin Cunev
263. Anatol Davadov
264. Valeriu Daraban
265. Vladimir Darii
266. Chiril Darmancev
267. Lidia Dicusar
268. Victor Diucarev
269. Mircea Druc
270. Alexandru Efanov
271. Gheorghe Efros
272. Valeriu Egorov
273. Vladimir Emilianov
274. Grigore Evstratii
275. Fiodor Evdodiev
276. Mihai Gajiu
277. Iurie Gherasimov
278. Gheorghe Ghimpu
279. Mihai Ghimpu
280. Vitalie Glebov
281. Vladimir Goncear
282. Mihai Goncearenco
283. Vasile Graf
284. Ion Grigoraş
285. Gheorghe Gusac
286. Mihai Guslikov
287. Ion Guţu
288. Ion Hadârcă
289. Grigore Jelihovski
290. Vladimir Labunski
291. Valentin Leşinski
292. Anatol Liseţki
293. Veaceslav Litvinenco
294. Vladlen Liuurov
295. Ion Luca
296. Petru Lupaşcu
297. Mihai Malai
298. Andrey Manoylov
299. Fiodor Marinov
300. Valeriu Matei
301. Emil Mazureac
302. Ion Mereuţă
303. Ion Miţcul
304. Andrei Moraru
305. Alexandru Morozov
306. Vasile Năstase
307. Petru Nastasiuc
308. Tudor Negru
309. Victor Nikulin
310. Constantin Novoderejkin
311. Valentin Oglindă
312. Nicolae Oleinic
313. Velor Ordine
314. Nicolae Ostapenco
315. Tudor Panţâru
316. Vasile Pasaniuc
317. Piotr Pascari
318. Ion Pădureţ
319. Ion Palancica
320. Boris Pălărie
321. Dumitru Pălărie
322. Mihai Patraș
323. Eugen Pâslaru
324. Sava Platon
325. Anatol Plugaru
326. Valentina Podgornaia
327. Petru Poian
328. Mihail Popovici
329. Anatol Popuşoi
330. Veniamin Potaşev
331. Evgheni Puşneac
332. Alexandra Raiu
333. Vladimir Rîleakov
334. Nicolai Riumin
335. Andrei Rusnac
336. Mircea Rusu
337. Andrei Safonov
338. Vasile Sajin
339. Anatol Salamandîk
340. Petru Sandulachi
341. Ludmila Silicenko
342. Anatol Simac
343. Igor Smirnov
344. Mircea Snegur
345. Mihai Şabarcin
346. Vasile Şoimaru
347. Constantin Tampiza
348. Ion Tăbâică
349. Dumitru Todoroi
350. Stepan Topal
351. Anatol Țăranu
352. Pavel Ţîmai
353. Ivan Ţînnik
354. Tudor Ţopa
355. Anatol Ţurcanu
356. Leonid Ţurcan
357. Anatol Ţurcanu
358. Ion Ţurcanu
359. Victor Uncuţă
360. Ion Ungureanu
361. Vasile Ursu
362. Andrei Vartic
363. Ignat Vasilachi
364. Ion Vatamanu
365. Vasile Vatamanu
366. Vasile Vodă
367. Piotr Volkov
368. Anna Volkova
369. Mihai Volontir
370. Mihai Voloşin
371. Piotr Zalojkov
372. Oleg Zapoliski
373. Iuri Zinoviev
374. Fiodor Zlatov
375. Vitali Znagovan

== Aftermath ==
The Popular Front of Moldova gained complete control once Gagauz and Transnistrian deputies walked out in protest over Romanian-oriented cultural reforms. One leader of the Popular Front of Moldova, Mircea Druc, formed the new government. The Popular Front saw its government as a purely transitional ministry; its role was to dissolve the Moldavian SSR and join Romania.
