= Chișinău Central Cemetery =

Cemetery in Chișinău, Moldova

- Cimitirul Central din Chișinău
- Interactive map of Chișinău Central Cemetery

Details
- Location: Sectorul Centru, Chișinău
- Country: Moldova
- Coordinates: 47°0′38″N 28°49′50″E

The Chișinău Central Cemetery (Romanian: Cimitirul Central din Chișinău) is a cemetery located in the Sectorul Centru of Chișinău, Moldova, in the "triangle" of Alexei Mateevici, Vasile Alecsandri and Pantelimon Halippa. Founded in 1811, it is the resting place of many prominent personalities in the history and culture of Moldova.

== Notable interments ==
1910s

- Alexei Mateevici (1888–1917) – poet

1920s

- Vladimir Herța (1868–1924) – jurist and politician; Mayor of Chișinău (1918–1919)
- Karl Shmidt (1846–1928) – politician; Mayor of Chișinău (1877–1903)
- Iacov Sucevan (1869–1929) – politician; Member of Sfatul Țării (1917–1918)

1930s

- Vasile Cijevschi (1881–1931) – writer and politician; Member of Sfatul Țării (1917–1918)
- Nicolae Alexandri (1859–1931) – politician; Member of Sfatul Țării (1917–1918)
- Serghei Donico-Iordăchescu (1889–1932) – politician; Member of Sfatul Țării (1917–1918)
- Toma Ciorbă (1864–1936) – physician; namesake of the Infectious Diseases Clinical Hospital
- Vasile Țanțu (1882–1937) – politician; Member of Sfatul Țării (1917–1918)
- Boris Epure (1882–1938) – politician; Member of Sfatul Țării (1917–1918)
- Mihail Ciachir (1861–1938) – protoiereus and educator

1940s

- Sergiu Niță (1893–1940) – lawyer and politician; Minister for Bessarabia (1920–1921; 1926–1927)
- Alexandru Plămădeală (1888–1940) – sculptor
- Ion Costin (1887–1940) – politician; Mayor of Chișinău (1933–1937)
- Constantin Bivol (1885–1942) – agronomist and politician; Member of Sfatul Țării (1917–1918)
- Alexandru Cristea (1890–1942) – composer

1950s

- Ștefan Neaga (1900–1951) – composer
- Eugen Coca (1893–1954) – violinist and composer
- Tihon Konstantinov (1898–1957) – politician; 1st Chairman of the Council of People's Commissars of the Moldavian SSR (1940–1945)

1960s

- Fyodor Brovko (1904–1960) – politician; 1st Chairman of the Presidium of the Supreme Soviet of the Moldavian SSR (1941–1951)
- Liviu Deleanu (1911–1967) – poet and playwright

1970s

- Nicolae Coval (1904–1970) – politician; First Secretary of the Communist Party of Moldavia (1946–1950)
- Iachim Grosul (1912–1976) – historian and academic; President of the Academy of Sciences of the Moldavian SSR (1961–1976)

1980s

- Kirill Ilyashenko (1915–1980) – politician; Chairman of the Presidium of the Supreme Soviet of the Moldavian SSR (1963–1980)
- Gherasim Rudi (1907–1982) – politician; Chairman of the Council of Ministers of the Moldavian SSR (1946–1958)
- Nikita Salogor (1901–1982) – politician; Chairman of the Supreme Soviet of the Moldavian SSR (1941–1947)
- Emilian Bucov (1909–1984) – writer and poet
- Nicolae Testemițanu (1927–1986) – physician; Minister of Health of the Moldavian SSR (1963–1968); namesake of the State University of Medicine and Pharmacy
- George Meniuc (1918–1987) – writer

1990s

- Doina and Ion Aldea Teodorovici (d. 1992) – musical duo
- Ion Dumeniuc (1936–1992) – linguist and author
- Andrei Lupan (1912–1992) – writer and politician; Chairman of the Supreme Soviet of the Moldavian SSR (1963–1967)
- Ion Vatamanu (1937–1993) – chemist, writer and politician; Member of the Moldovan Parliament (1990–1993)
- Anton Crihan (1893–1993) – lawyer, economist and politician; Member of Sfatul Țării (1917–1918)
- Bogdan Istru (1914–1993) – poet
- Nicolai Costenco (1913–1993) – writer
- Nicolae Costin (1936–1995) – politician; Mayor of Chișinău (1990–1994)
- Lidia Istrati (1942–1997) – writer and politician; Member of the Moldovan Parliament (1990–1997)
- Vladimir Andrunakievich (1917–1997) – mathematician and academic
- Sergiu Rădăuțanu (1926–1998) – physicist and politician; Chairman of the Supreme Soviet of the Moldavian SSR (1967–1971)
- Mihai Grecu (1916–1998) – painter

2000s

- Gheorghe Ghimpu (1937–2000) – politician; Member of the Moldovan Parliament (1990–1994)
- Natalia Gheorghiu (1914–2001) – physician
- Victor Teleucă (1933–2002) – writer
- Nicolae Sulac (1936–2003) – folk singer; namesake of the National Palace
- Grigore Grigoriu (1941–2003) – actor
- Alexandru Usatiuc-Bulgăr (1915–2003) – activist and political prisoner
- Pavel Barbalat (1935–2004) – jurist; 1st President of the Constitutional Court
- Pavel Creangă (1933–2004) – military general; Minister of Defense (1992–1997)
- Ada Zevin (1918–2005) – painter
- Antonina Lucinschi (1939–2005) – educator; First Lady of Moldova (1997–2001)
- Mihai Petric (1923–2005) – painter
- Gheorghe Vodă (1934–2007) – writer and film director
- Silviu Berejan (1927–2007) – philologist and academic
- Mihai Dolgan (1942–2008) – singer and composer
- Vasile Vasilache (1926–2008) – writer
- Andrei Vartic (1948–2009) – writer and politician; Member of the Moldovan Parliament (1990–1994)
- Grigore Vieru (1936–2009) – poet

2010s

- Anatol Codru (1936–2010) – writer and film director
- Valeriu Gagiu (1938–2010) – screenwriter and film director
- Leonida Lari (1949–2011) – poet and politician
- Serafim Saca (1935–2011) – writer
- Ivan Calin (1935–2012) – agronomist and politician; Chairman of the Council of Ministers of the Moldavian SSR (1985–1990)
- Maria Bieșu (1935–2012) – opera singer; namesake of the National Opera and Ballet Theatre
- Valentin Mândâcanu (1930–2012) – writer and politician; Member of the Moldovan Parliament (1990–1994)
- Diomid Gherman (1928–2014) – physician; namesake of the Institute of Neurology and Neurosurgery
- Timofei Moșneaga (1932–2014) – physician and politician; Minister of Health (1994–1997); namesake of the Republican Clinical Hospital
- Constantin Tănase (1949–2014) – journalist and politician; Member of the Moldovan Parliament (1990–1994)
- Eugen Gladun (1936–2014) – physician and politician; Minister of Health (1998–1999)
- Mihai Volontir (1932–2015) – actor
- Anatol Dumitraș (1955–2016) – singer
- Gheorghe Vrabie (1939–2016) – plastic artist
- Petru Soltan (1931–2016) – mathematician and politician; Member of the Moldovan Parliament (1990–1994)
- Anatol Ciobanu (1934–2016) – linguist and academic
- Nicolae Esinencu (1940–2016) – poet and writer
- Ion Ungureanu (1935–2017) – actor and politician; Minister of Culture and Cults (1990–1994)
- Vladimir Curbet (1930–2017) – choreographer
- Alexandru Moșanu (1932–2017) – historian and politician; 1st President of the Moldovan Parliament (1991–1993)
- Ion Ciubuc (1943–2018) – economist and politician; Prime Minister of Moldova (1997–1999)
- Dumitru Moțpan (1940–2018) – politician; President of the Moldovan Parliament (1997–1998)
- Petru Cărare (1935–2019) – writer
- Vladimir Hotineanu (1950–2019) – physician and politician; Minister of Health (2009–2011)
- Georgeta Snegur (1937–2019) – First Lady of Moldova (1990–1997)
- Ion Dediu (1934–2019) – ecologist and politician; Minister of Environment (1990–1994)

2020s

- Valeriu Muravschi (1949–2020) – politician; 1st Prime Minister of Moldova (1991–1992)
- Ștefan Petrache (1949–2020) – singer
- Nicolae Dabija (1948–2021) – writer and politician; Member of the Moldovan Parliament (1990–1994; 1998–2001)
- Andrei Strâmbeanu (1934–2021) – writer and politician; Member of the Moldovan Parliament (1998–2001)
- Valentina Rusu-Ciobanu – painter
- Ion Ciocanu (1940–2021) – literary critic
- Mihail Cibotaru (1934–2021) – writer and politician; Minister of Culture (1994–1997)
- Anton Gămurari (1950–2021) – military general
- Haralambie Corbu (1930–2021) – writer and academic
- Victor Pușcaș (1943–2023) – jurist and politician; President of the Constitutional Court (2001–2007)
- Mircea Snegur (1940–2023) – agronomist and politician; 1st President of Moldova (1990–1997)
- Spiridon Vangheli (1932–2024) – writer and poet
- Grigore Eremei (1935–2024) – politician; last First Secretary of the Communist Party of Moldavia (1991)
- Mihai Amihălăchioaie (1961–2024) – accordionist and conductor
- Eugen Doga (1937–2025) – composer; namesake of the Chișinău International Airport
- Vladimir Beșleagă (1931–2025) – writer and politician; Member of the Moldovan Parliament (1990–1994)
- Vasile Iovv (1942–2025) – engineer and politician; First Deputy Prime Minister of Moldova (2002–2005)
- Gheorghe Urschi (1948–2026) – actor and comedian
