= Order of the Republic (Moldova) =

Moldova's highest order

Order of the Republic Ordinul Republicii
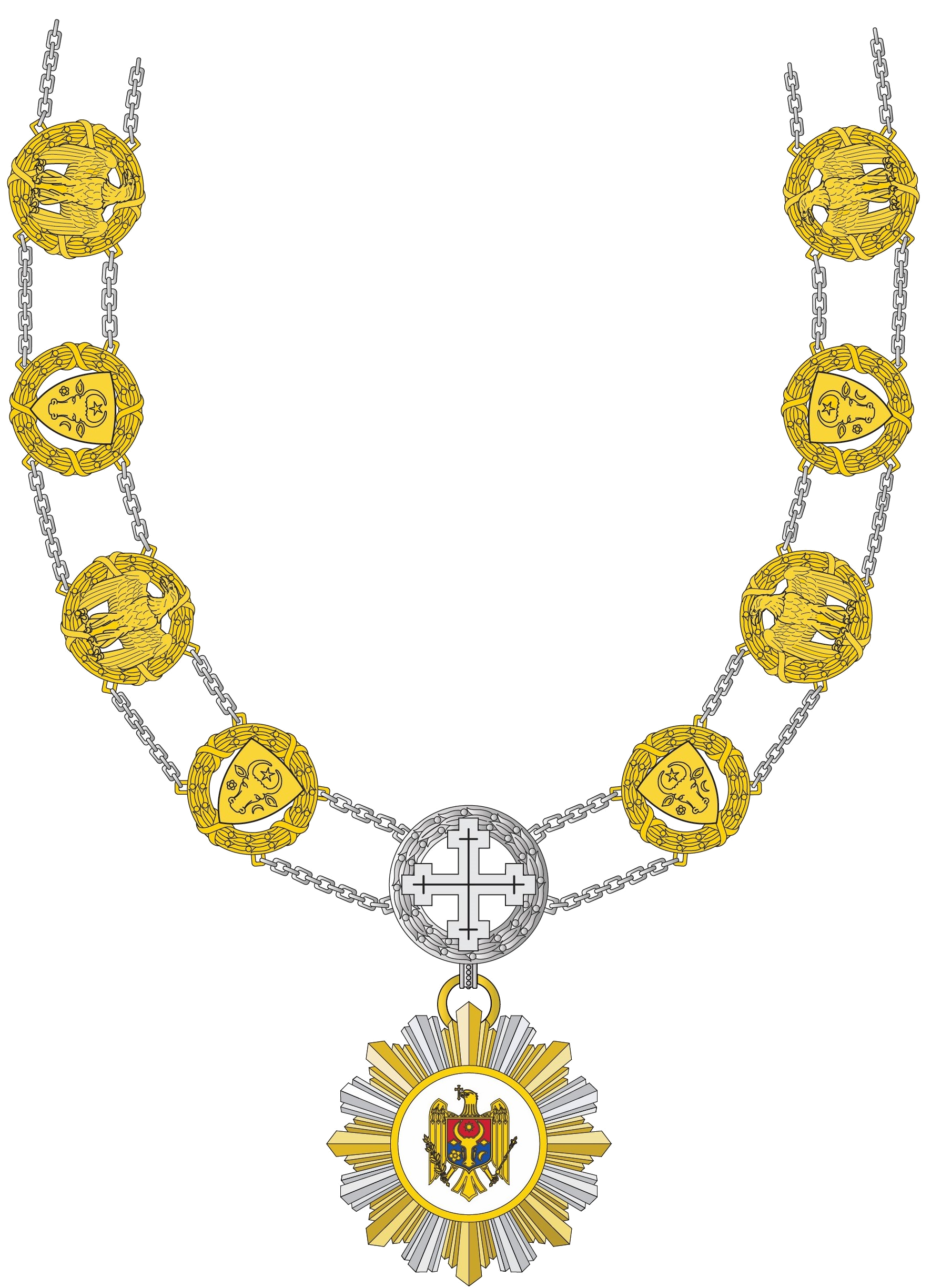

Awarded by the President of Moldova
- Type: Single-grade state order
- Established: 30 July 1992; 34 years ago
- Country: Moldova
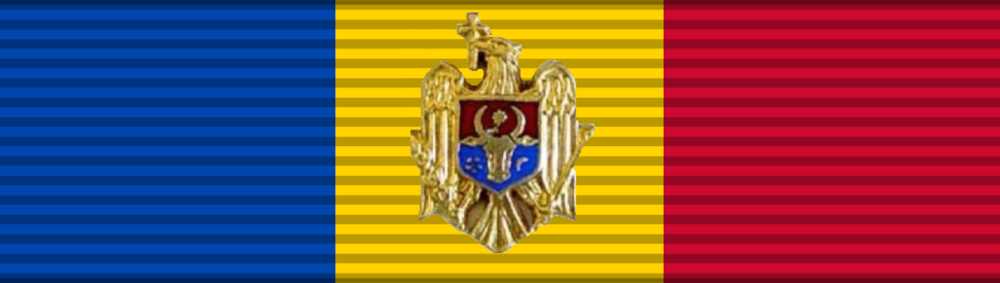
- Ribbon
- Eligibility: Moldovan and foreign individuals and organizations
- Status: Active

Precedence
- Next (higher): None
- Next (lower): Order of Stephen the Great

The Order of the Republic (Romanian: Ordinul Republicii) is Moldova's highest order. It is awarded by the President of Moldova for exceptional merits in all fields which benefit Moldova and humanity as a whole. The order was established in July 1992 and its collar and badge are made from silver.

A recipient cannot receive the award twice. The next (lower) award is the Order of Stephen the Great.

== Recipients ==
=== Moldovan ===
==== 1992 ====
- Anton Gămurari
- Nicolae Sulac
- Tudor Casapu
- Maria Bieșu
- Eugen Pâslaru
- Vladimir Curbet
- Mihai Grecu
- Doina and Ion Aldea Teodorovici

1993

- Pavel Barbulat

==== 1994 ====
- Ion Bostan
- Eva Gudumac
- Domnica Darienco

==== 1995 ====
- Natalia Gheorghiu
- Gheorghe Paladi

==== 1996 ====
- Anatol Codru
- Sergiu Rădăuțanu
- Vladimir Beșleagă
- Vasile Vasilache
- Mihai Cimpoi
- Nicolae Dabija
- Dumitru Matcovschi
- Spiridon Vangheli
- Grigore Vieru
- Silviu Berejan
- Anatol Ciobanu
- Ion Hadârcă
- Leonida Lari
- Nicolae Juravschi
- Vladimir Andrunakievich
- Haralambie Corbu

==== 1997 ====
- Eugen Doga
- Sofia Rotaru
- Eugenio Coșeriu
- Timofei Moșneaga

==== 1998 ====
- Mihai Petric
- Eugen Gladun
- Ilie Bogdesko
- Valeriu Gagiu
- Victor Teleucă
- Ada Zevin

==== 1999 ====
- Metropolitan Vladimir
- Victor Pușcaș

==== 2000 ====
- Mircea Snegur
- Serafim Urechean
- Emil Loteanu

==== 2001 ====
- Nicolae Filip
- Mihai Dolgan
- Leonid Talmaci

==== 2002 ====
- Vasile Iovv
- Mihail Popovici

==== 2003 ====
- Ivan Bodiul

==== 2004 ====
- Ion Ababii
- Ion Suruceanu

==== 2005 ====
- Petru Lucinschi
- Ivan Calin
- Vadim Mișin
- Gheorghe Ghidirim
- Valerian Revenco

==== 2006 ====
- Zinaida Greceanîi
- Valeria Șterbeț

==== 2007 ====
- Eugenia Ostapciuc

==== 2008 ====
- Gheorghe Urschi
- Vasile Tarlev
- Anatolie Popușoi

==== 2009 ====
- Dumitru Pulbere
- Aurelian Silvestru
- Petru Bogatu
- Lorena Bogza
- Vasile Botnaru
- Val Butnaru
- Corina Fusu
- Aneta Grosu
- Valeriu Saharneanu
- Constantin Tănase
- Valentina Ursu
- Ion Ungureanu

==== 2010 ====
- Petru Cărare
- Ion Ciocanu
- Mihail Cibotaru
- Nicolae Esinencu
- Serafim Saca
- Andrei Strâmbeanu
- Valeriu Boboc
- Nicolae Mătcaș
- Diomid Gherman
- Ion Dediu
- Valentin Mândâcanu
- Petru Godiac
- Ilie Ilașcu
- Andrei Ivanțoc
- Alexandru Leșco
- Tudor Petrov-Popa
- Ștefan Urîtu
- Nicolai Costenco
- Vadim Pirogan
- Pantelimon Halippa
- Alexandru Usatiuc-Bulgăr
- Gheorghe Ghimpu
- Valeriu Graur
- Alexandru Șoltoianu
- Nadejda Brînzan
- Ion Ciuntu
- Nicolae Costin
- Mircea Druc
- Lidia Istrati
- Valeriu Matei
- Ion Moraru
- Alexandru Moșanu
- Vasile Nedelciuc
- Tudor Panțîru
- Gheorghe Grosu
- Petru Soltan
- Anatol Șalaru
- Andrei Vartic
- Ion Vatamanu
- Boris Vieru
- Gheorghe Vrabie
- Adrian Păunescu
- Vasile Bahnaru
- Ion Dumeniuc
- Ion Iovcev
- Nicolae Testemițanu
- Andrei Eșanu
- Nicolae Glib

==== 2011 ====
- Alecu Reniță
- Anatol Țăranu
- Gheorghe Duca
- Vitalie Gorincioi
- Victor Berlinschi
- Mihai Coșcodan
- Gheorghe Hioară
- Mihai Patraș

==== 2012 ====
- Valeriu Bulgari
- Mihai Ghimpu
- Dumitru Puntea
- Vladimir Darie
- Ion Lapaci
- Aurel Saulea
- Nicolae Negru
- Ion Munteanu
- Anatol Chiriac
- Alexei Barbăneagră
- Gheorghe Amihalachioaie
- Nicolae Andronic
- Alexandru Arseni
- Mihai Volontir
- Dumitru Todoroi
- Ion Mărgineanu
- Ion Batcu
- Ion Costaș
- Ilie Bratu
- Gheorghe Ciobanu
- Mihai Dimitriu
- Ion Chiriac
- Ion Buga
- Dumitru Noroc
- Mihai Cotorobai
- Petru Munteanu
- Valentin Dolganiuc
- Sergiu Chircă
- Mihail Druță
- Ion Guțu
- Ion Madan
- Ion Negură
- Ștefan Maimescu
- Dumitru Moțpan
- Ion Palii
- Dumitru Brașoveanu
- Vasile Para
- Nicolae Misail
- Ion Borșevici
- Ion Popa
- Anatol Plugaru
- Mihai Poiată
- Dumitru Postovan
- Ion Russu
- Tudor Țopa
- Ion Țurcanu
- Vasile Ursu
- Valentin Colun
- Vasile Vatamanu

==== 2013 ====
- Vladimir Hotineanu
- Dumitru Diacov

==== 2014 ====
- Anatol Vidrașcu
- Anastasia Lazariuc
- Ștefan Petrache
- Mihai Severovan
- Igor Corman
- Natalia Gherman
- Ana Guțu
- Iurie Leancă
- Marian Lupu
- Liliana Palihovici
- Ion Păduraru
- Valeriu Streleț
- Nicolae Osmochescu

==== 2015 ====
- Mihail Cibotaru
- Pavel Cebanu
- Victor Catan

==== 2016 ====
- Grigore Belostecinic
- Vladimir Braga
- Veaceslav Untilă
- Mihai Furtună

==== 2017 ====
- Dmitri Todoroglo
- Ion Solonenco
- Dumitru Braghiș
- Victor Gaiciuc
- Andrei Sangheli
- Stepan Topal
- Mihail Kendighelean

==== 2018 ====
- Victor Țvircun
- Victor Stepaniuc

==== 2019 ====
- Valeriu Pasat
- Vasile Stati
- Larisa Șavga
- Ion Dosca
- Eduard Smirnov
- Petru Pascari

==== 2020 ====
- Mihail Pop
- Valeriu Chițan
- Valeriu Jereghi
- Eugeniu Știrbu
- Vladimir Țurcan
- Valeriu Rudic
- Alexandru Muravschi
- Mitrofan Cioban
- Larisa Popova

==== 2021 ====
- Lidia Kulikovski
- Nicolae Bulat
- Viorel Iordachescu
- Valeriu Mițul
- Valeriu Muravschi
- Valentina Naforniță
- Tatiana Țîbuleac
- Veaceslav Țurcan

==== 2023 ====
- Tudor Zbârnea
- Nicu Popescu

==== 2024 ====
- Petru Hadârcă
- Valeriu Duminică

==== 2025 ====
- Emilian Galaicu-Păun
- Vasile Șoimaru
- Oazu Nantoi
- Ala Nemerenco
- Nicolae Timofti

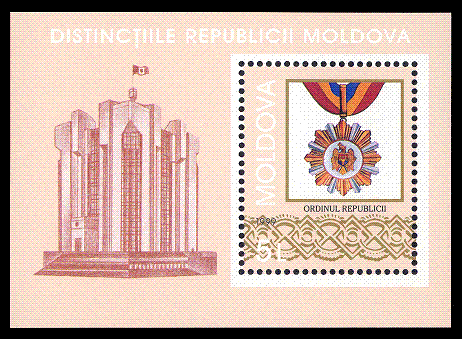
The order on a 1999 stamp of the Post of Moldova

=== Foreign ===
- Jacques Chirac – President of France (1995–2007)
- Juan Antonio Samaranch – President of the International Olympic Committee (1980–2001)
- Konstantinos Stephanopoulos – President of Greece (1995–2005)
- Emil Constantinescu – President of Romania (1996–2000)
- Leonid Kuchma – President of Ukraine (1994–2005)
- Süleyman Demirel – President of Turkey (1993–2000)
- Alexy II of Moscow – Patriarch of Moscow and all Rus' (1990–2008)
- Karolos Papoulias – President of Greece (2005–2015)
- Stjepan Mesić – President of Croatia (2000–2010)
- Georgi Parvanov – President of Bulgaria (2002–2012)
- Alexey Miller
- Traian Băsescu – President of Romania (2004–2014)
- Eugen Simion
- Tudor Gheorghe
- Mikheil Saakashvili – President of Georgia (2004–2007; 2008–2013)
- Kirill of Moscow – Patriarch of Moscow and all Rus' (2009–present)
- Bartholomew I of Constantinople – Archbishop of Constantinople-New Rome and Ecumenical Patriarch (1991–present)
- Irinel Popescu
- Gheorghe Zamfir
- Petro Poroshenko – President of Ukraine (2014–2019)
- Bronislaw Komorowski – President of Poland (2010–2015)
- Dalia Grybauskaitė – President of Lithuania (2009–2019)
- Angela Merkel – Chancellor of Germany (2005–2021)
- Klaus Iohannis – President of Romania (2014–2025)
- Alexander Lukashenko – President of Belarus (1994–present)
- Rosen Plevneliev – President of Bulgaria (2012–2017)
- Dacian Cioloș – Prime Minister of Romania (2015–2017)
- Gurbanguly Berdimuhamedow – President of Turkmenistan (2007–2022)
- Victor Ponta – Prime Minister of Romania (2012–2015; 2015)
- Recep Tayyip Erdoğan – President of Turkey (2014–present)
- Emmanuel Macron – President of France (2017–present)
- Elaine Marshall – Secretary of State of North Carolina (1997–present)
- Salome Zourabichvili – President of Georgia (2018–2024)
- Gitanas Nausėda – President of Lithuania (2019–present)
- Volodymyr Zelenskyy – President of Ukraine (2019–present)

=== Institutional ===
- Cricova
- Joc National Ballet of Moldova
- Lăutarii National Orchestra
- Moldova State University
- National Library of Moldova
- Purcari
- State Agrarian University of Moldova
- Technical University of Moldova
- Nicolae Testemițanu State University of Medicine and Pharmacy
- State University of Physical Education and Sport
- Timofei Moșneaga Republican Clinical Hospital
- Diomid Gherman Institute of Neurology and Neurosurgery
- Mother and Child Institute
- Orhei-Vit
- Ionel (clothing factory)
- Țiganca (winery)
- Codreanca Dance Studio
- National Museum of Fine Arts of Moldova
- Alecu Russo State University of Bălți
