= Ion Russu =

Moldovan politician (born 1941)

Ion Russu OR

Minister of Agriculture and Manufacturing Industry
- In office 21 December 1999 – 19 April 2001
- President: Petru Lucinschi; Vladimir Voronin
- Prime Minister: Dumitru Braghiș
- Preceded by: Valeriu Bulgari
- Succeeded by: Dmitri Todoroglo (as Minister of Agriculture and Food Industry)

Moldovan Ambassador to Ukraine and Armenia
- In office 18 August 1994 – 26 October 1998
- President: Mircea Snegur; Petru Lucinschi
- Prime Minister: Andrei Sangheli; Ion Ciubuc
- Preceded by: Ion Borșevici
- Succeeded by: Alexei Andrievschi

People's Deputy of the Soviet Union
- In office 26 March 1989 – 5 September 1991
- Constituency: Slobozia

Personal details
- Born: 16 July 1941 (age 84) Făleștii Noi, Moldavian SSR, Soviet Union

Ion Russu (born 16 July 1941) is a Moldovan politician and diplomat. He served as the Minister of Agriculture in the Braghiș Cabinet.
