= Dimitriu =

Dimitriu is a Romanian surname that may refer to:

- Anatolie Dimitriu (born 1973), Moldovan politician
- Constantin Dimitriu-Dovlecel (1872–1945), Romanian lawyer and politician
- Mihai Dimitriu, Moldovan politician who served in the Moldovan Parliament 1990–1994
