= Druță =

Druță is a surname. Notable people with the surname include:

- Boris Druță (born 1955), Moldovan lawyer, writer, and singer-songwriter
- Ion Druță (1928–2023), Moldovan writer, poet, playwright, and literary historian
- Mihail Druță (born 1957), Moldovan historian and politician

== See also ==
- Pociumbeni
