= Vatamanu =

Vatamanu is a Moldovan and Romanian surname. Notable people with the surname include:

- Alexandru Vatamanu, Romanian sports shooter
- Ion Vatamanu (1937–1993), Moldovan writer and politician
- Vasile Vatamanu (1955–2011), Moldovan politician
