= Ion Bostan =

Ion Bostan may refer to:

- Ion Bostan (film director) (1914–1992), Romanian documentary film director
- Ion Bostan (academic) (born 1949), professor and researcher from Moldova
