= Elena Zamura =

Moldovan journalist

Elena Zamura OR
- Occupation: Journalist
- Awards: Order of the Republic (Moldova)

Elena Zamura is a journalist from the Republic of Moldova. She is the editor in chief of 'Novoie Vremea' weekly.

== Awards ==
- Order of the Republic (Moldova) - highest state distinctions (2009)
