= Bogza =

The name Bogza (Romanian pronunciation: [ˈboɡza]) may refer to:

- Anda-Louise Bogza (1965–2025), Romanian opera soprano
- Geo Bogza (1908–1993), Romanian avant-garde theorist, poet, and journalist
- Lorena Bogza (born 1971), Romanian-born Moldovan journalist
- Nicolae Bogza (1910–1992), Romanian novelist

== See also ==
- Bogza, a village in Sihlea Commune, Vrancea County, Romania
