= Chiriac =

Chiriac is a surname. Notable people with the surname include:

- Afanasie Chiriac (1891-1977), Bessarabian politician
- Anatol Chiriac (born 1953), Moldovan composer
- Corina Chiriac (born 1949), Romanian singer, composer, lyricist, television director, and actress
- Cornel Chiriac (1941–1975), Romanian journalist, radio producer, record producer, and jazz drummer
- Daniel Chiriac (born 1973), Romanian rugby union player
- George Chiriac (born 1979), Romanian rugby union player
- Ion Chiriac, Moldovan politician
- Radu Chiriac (born 2000), Romanian footballer
