= Silviu Berejan =

Silviu Berejan OR
- Born: 30 July 1927; Bălăbănești, Kingdom of Romania
- Died: 10 November 2007 (aged 80)
- Occupation: Researcher
- Employer: Academy of Sciences of Moldova
- Political party: Popular Front of Moldova

Silviu Berejan (30 July 1927 – 10 November 2007) was a Romanian philologist, lexicologist and linguist from Bessarabia, one of the titular members of the Academy of Sciences of Moldova, the romance linguistic specialty (especially Romanian) and Slavic (especially Russian), principal scientist at the Institute of Linguistics of the Academy of Sciences of Moldova.

== Biography ==
Silviu Berejan was born on 30 July 1927 in Bălăbăneşti, Criuleni. He graduated from the Moldova State University in 1952.

== Awards ==
- Premiul de Stat al Republicii Moldova,
- Doctor Honoris Causa of Universitatea de Stat „Alecu Russo” Bălţi,

== Works ==
- Contribuţii la studiul infinitivului moldovenesc (1962);
- Семантическая эквивалентность лексических единиц (1973);
- Autor şi redactor a 4 dicţionare, inclusiv Dicţionar explicativ şcolar (1960, 1969, 1976, 1979, 1984, în colaborare); Dicţionar explicativ al limbii moldoveneşti (în 2 vol., 1977; 1985); Dicţionar explicativ uzual al limbii române (1999, coordonator al lucrării) etc.;
- Autor a 6 manuale: Limba moldovenească literară contemporană. Morfologia (1983, în colaborare); Lingvistica generală (1985, în colaborare); Curs de gramatică istorică a limbii române (1991, în colaborare)
- Redactor ştiinţific a cca 40 de cărţi de lingvistică; traducător, redactor şi editor al operelor unor somităţi ale lingvisticii ca V. F. Şişmariov (Limbile romanice din sud-estul Europei şi limba naţională a R.S.S.M., 1960); Iorgu Iordan ( оманское языкознание: Историческое развитие, течения, методы. Moscova, 1971, în colaborare); Eugeniu Coşeriu (Structurile lexematice // Revista de lingvistică şi ştiinţă literară, 1992, nr. 5; Lingvistica din perspectiva spaţială şi antropologică: Trei studii / Cu o prefaţă de Silviu Berejan şi un punct de vedere editorial de Stelian Dumistrăcel, 1994); Raymund Piotrowski (Sinergetica şi ocrotirea limbii române în Republica Moldova // Revista de lingvistică şi ştiinţă literară, 1997, nr. 3); *Coordonator al volumului "Limba română este Patria mea. Studii. Comunicări. Documente" (1996).
- În perioada 1988–2006 semnează cca 100 de articole de publicistică lingvistică privind statutul limbii române din Republica Moldova.
