= Mihai Poiată =

Moldovan politician (born 1949)

Mihai Poiată OR

Member of the Moldovan Parliament
- In office 17 April 1990 – 29 March 1994
- Parliamentary group: Popular Front
- Constituency: Strășeni

Personal details
- Born: 4 December 1949 (age 76) Cojuşna, Moldavian SSR, Soviet Union
- Party: Popular Front of Moldova

Mihai Poiată (born 4 December 1949) is a Moldovan politician.

== Biography ==
He served as member of the Parliament of Moldova.
