= Mihai Patraș =

Moldovan politician (born 1951)

Mihai Patraș OR

Member of the Moldovan Parliament
- In office 17 April 1990 – 29 March 1994
- Constituency: Ungheni

Personal details
- Born: 25 June 1951 (age 75) Bahrynivka, Chernivtsi Oblast, Ukrainian SSR, Soviet Union
- Party: Popular Front of Moldova

Mihai Patraș (born 25 June 1951) is a Moldovan politician.

== Biography ==
He served as a member of the Parliament of Moldova and is a leader of the Democratic Forum of Romanians in Moldova.

Mihai Patraș participated in the 1998 Moldovan parliamentary election, as a candidate of the Party of Reform.
