= Gheorghe Grosu =

Moldovan politician

Gheorghe Grosu OR

Member of the Moldovan Parliament
- In office 1990–1994

Personal details
- Party: Popular Front of Moldova

Gheorghe Grosu is a Romanian teacher who served as member of the Parliament of Moldova from 1990–1994.
