= Andrei Strâmbeanu =

Moldovan writer and politician (1934–2021)

Andrei Strâmbeanu OR
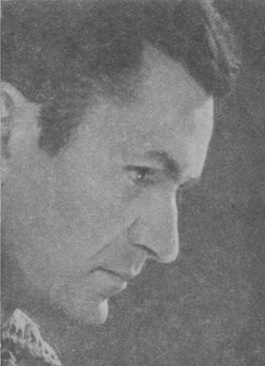
- Strâmbeanu in 1970

Member of the Moldovan Parliament
- In office 22 March 1998 – 20 March 2001
- Parliamentary group: Democratic Convention

Personal details
- Born: 25 August 1934 Fântâna Albă, Kingdom of Romania (now Moldova)
- Died: 5 August 2021 (aged 86) Timișoara, Romania
- Party: Popular Front of Moldova
- Spouse: Aliona
- Children: Vanessa

Andrei Strâmbeanu (25 August 1934 – 5 August 2021) was a Moldovan writer and politician. He served as a member of the Parliament of Moldova (1998–2001).
