= Lidia Kulikovski =

Moldovan librarian and bibliographer

Lidia Kulikovski OR
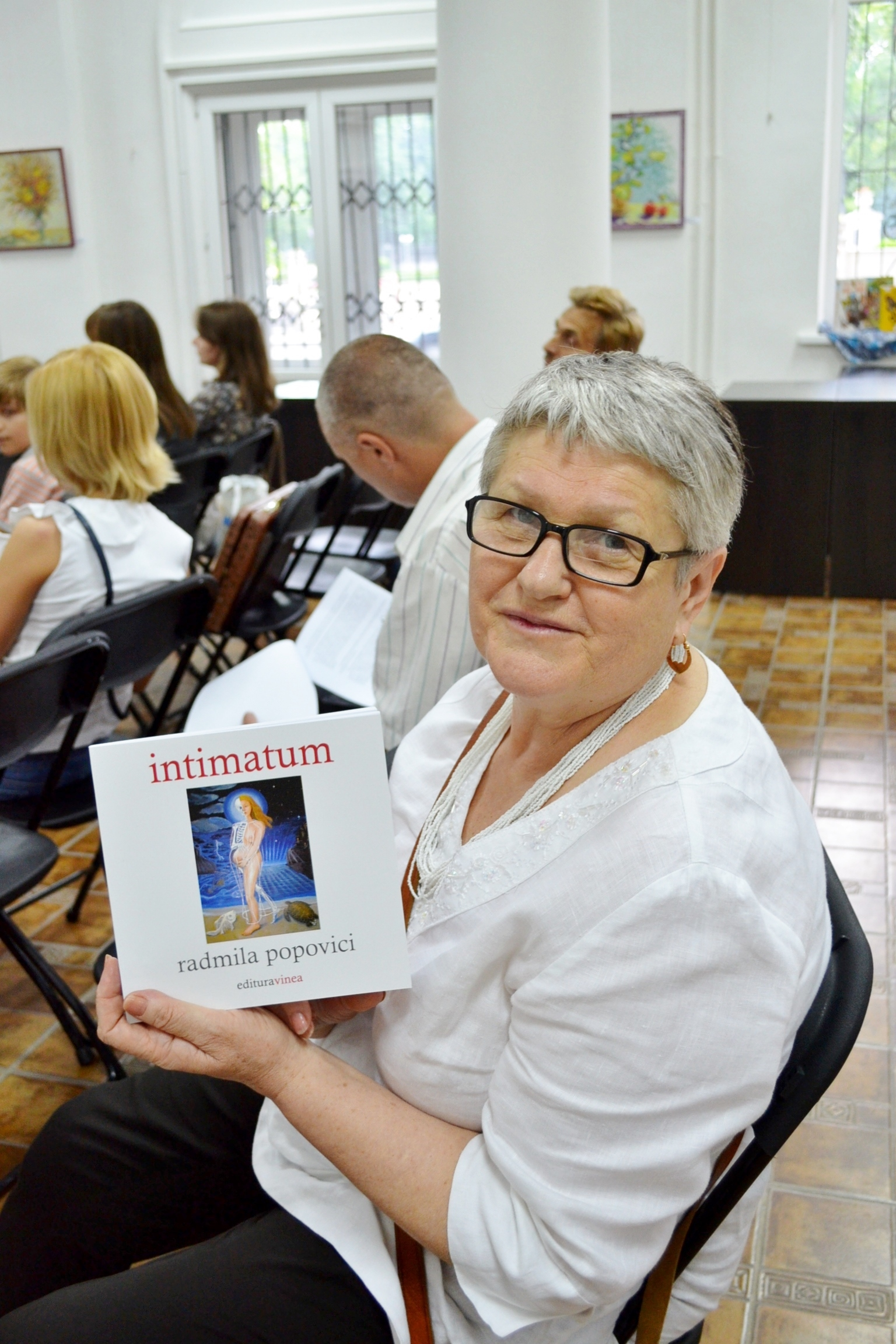
- Kulikovski in 2014
- Born: March 8, 1951 (age 75); Nicoreni, Moldavian SSR, Soviet Union
- Education: Moldova State University (–1973)
- Occupations: librarian, bibliographer

Lidia Kulikovski (born 8 March 1951) is a Moldovan librarian and bibliographer. As head of the Hasdeu Municipal Library, she extended the library network opening nine branches in Chișinău focused mainly on Romanian literature.

== Education ==
Kulikovski was born Nicoreni, Drochia District, Moldovan SSR. She graduated in Philology (librarianship section) at the State University of Moldova in 1973, having Ion Osadcenco and Anatol Ciobanu among her professors. In 2003, she obtained a doctoral degree in Pedagogy, with a dissertation on the "Evolution of library services for disadvantaged people in the context of a society's democratization".

== Career ==
On graduating, Kulikovski led a subsidiary of the Municipal Library of Chișinău. In 1978–1982, she was the head of the "centralized library system" of Cahul. She then returned to the Municipal Library to lead its acquisitions team until 1989. Either in 1989 or in 1990 Kulikovski became the director of the Hasdeu Municipal Library, a position she held until 2013.

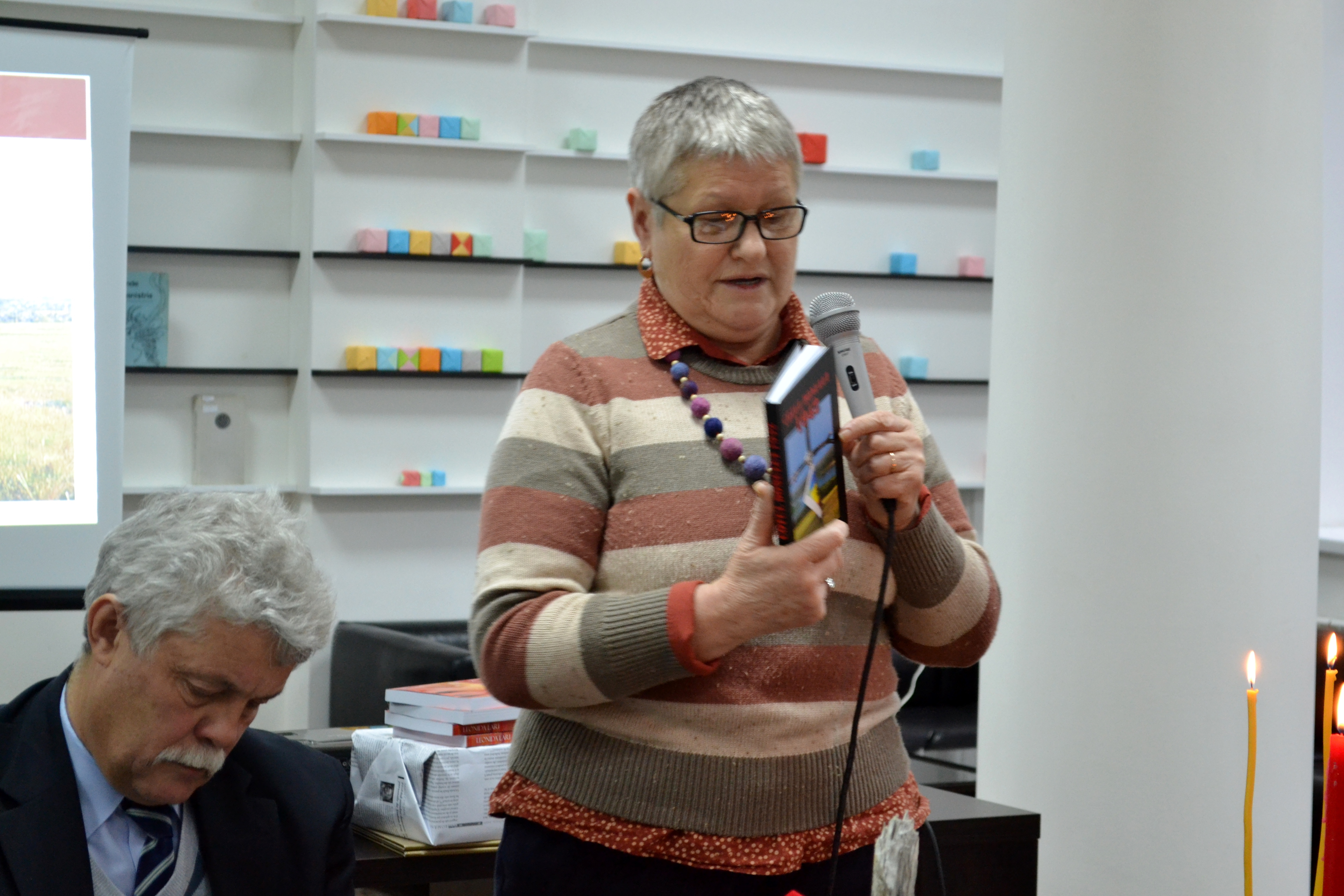
Lidia Kulikovski at a book premiere

Lidia Kulikovski authored a number of bibliography research projects. She coordinated, on a national level, European projects including PULMAN and Calimera. Between 2000 and 2004 she headed the Librarians' Association of the Republic of Moldova. In 2002, Kulikovski founded BiblioPolis, a librarianship journal. For some time, starting in 1999, she was the deputy editor-in-chief for Magazin bibliologic, also a library journal.

Representing the Municipal Library of Chișinău, Kulikovski has visited a number of renowned international libraries, such as the Library of Congress, the National Library of China, Centre Pompidou, the Royal Library of Denmark, as well as municipal libraries in Finland, Greece, Russia, Israel, Romania, Ukraine, etc.

Kulikovski has also authored some 200 research papers, bibliographies, interviews, book prefaces and essays. She conducted the issuing of 25 books about Moldovan writers, artists, and scientists, published by the Municipal Library.

Aside from her scientific activity, Kulikovski is also a professor at the State University of Moldova, Journalism faculty, department of Librarianship, where she lectures on librarianship, book sociology, and library management. She gave the same courses to the students of a librarianship school that the Librarians' Association was running.

=== Head of the Hasdeu Municipal Library ===
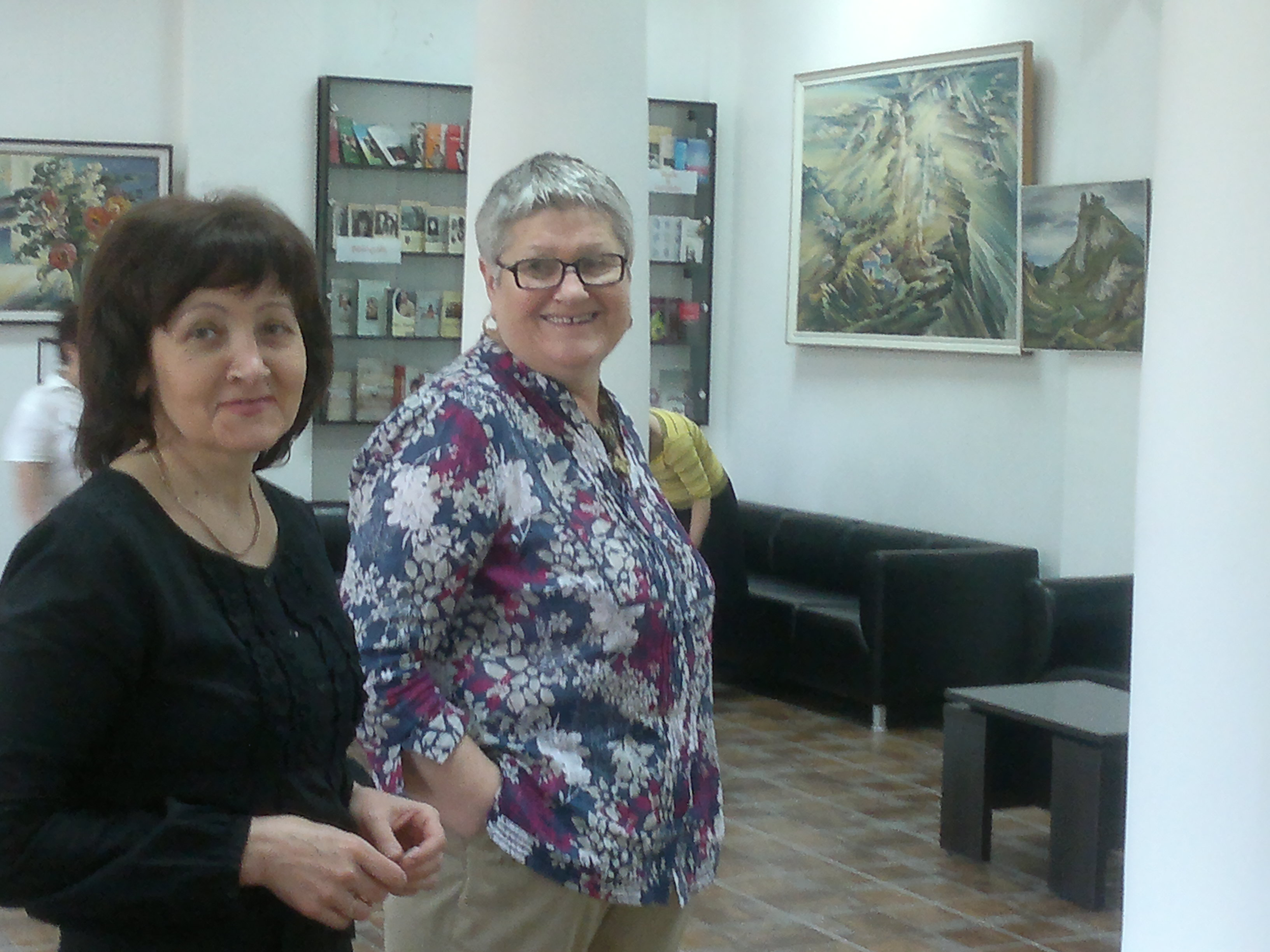
Lidia Kulikovski (right) and deputy head of the Municipal Library, Elena Butucel

As head of the Hasdeu Municipal Library, Kulikovski is best known for de-ideologizing the library's collection of books and documents, and for extending the library's network. In this connection, she sought Romanian help to open nine subsidiary libraries in Chișinău containing mainly Romanian literature, and she pioneered an ethnic diversity project that led to the opening of subsidiaries with Russian, Ukrainian, Polish, Bulgarian, Jewish, and Gagauz literature.

== Recognition ==
Lidia Kulikovski was awarded the title of "Honored worker of culture" in 1987. She received the "Meritul Civic" Medal în 1996, and the "Gloria Muncii" Order in 2010. She holds the European award "21st century manager" (2001). In April 2021, on Librarian's Day, Kulikovski was awarded Moldova's highest order, the Order of the Republic, for "outstanding contribution on development of the libraries of Moldova".

== Personal life ==
Lidia Kulikovski married engineer Victor Kulikovski in 1976. They have two daughters: one of them is a philologist and lives in Spain, the other is a marketologist.

== Bibliography ==
- Lidia Kulikovski: biobibliografie. Chișinău: Elan Poligraf. 2006. Archived from the original on December 28, 2017.
- Colesnic, Iurie; Movilă, Boris (2000). Femei din Moldova: enciclopedie. Museum. pp. 166–167.
