= Dumitru Todoroi =

Moldovan politician (born 1940)

Dumitru Todoroi OR

Member of the Moldovan Parliament
- In office 17 April 1990 – 29 March 1994
- Parliamentary group: Popular Front
- Constituency: Ungheni

Personal details
- Born: Unțești, Moldavian SSR, Soviet Union
- Party: Popular Front of Moldova

Dumitru Todoroi (born 13 March 1940) is a Moldovan mathematician and former politician.

== Biography ==
He served as member of the Parliament of Moldova.
