= Ion Buga =

Moldovan politician and historian (born 1935)

Ion Buga OR

Member of the Moldovan Parliament
- In office 17 April 1990 – 27 February 1994

Personal details
- Born: February 16, 1935 (age 91)
- Party: New Historical Option (then known as the Romanian National Party)
- Other political affiliations: Popular Front of Moldova

Ion Buga (born 16 February 1935) is a Moldovan politician and history professor.

== Biography ==
He served as member of the Parliament of Moldova in 1990s and president of the party New Historical Option (then called Romanian National Party) after 2000.

He is a leader of the Democratic Forum of Romanians in Moldova.

Ion Buga is one of the 278 signatories to the Declaration of Independence of the Republic of Moldova.

== Distinctions and decorations ==
- Order of the Republic (2012)
- The "Civic Merit" Medal (1996)
