= Valentin Mândâcanu =

Moldovan writer and politician

Valentin Mândâcanu OR
- Born: July 27, 1930; Mihăileni, Bălţi, Romania
- Died: October 29, 2012 (aged 82)
- Education: Moldova State University
- Spouse: Iulia
- Parent: Roman Mândâcanu

Valentin Mândâcanu (27 July 1930 – 29 October 2012) was a writer and politician from Republic of Moldova.

Mândâcanu was a founder of the Democratic Movement of Moldova. He was elected in 1990 election and served as member of the Parliament of Republic of Moldova (1990–1994).

== Awards ==
- Honorary citizen Chişinău
