= Petru Soltan =

Moldovan mathematician and politician (1931–2016)

- Born: June 29, 1931; Coșnița, Moldavian ASSR, Soviet Union
- Died: 15 July 2016 (aged 85); Chișinău, Moldova
- Education: Moscow State University
- Awards: Om emerit al Republicii Moldova (1994)
- Scientific career
- Fields: mathematics
- Workplaces: Moldova State University; Academy of Sciences of Moldova
- Doctoral advisor: Pavel Sergeevich Aleksandrov

Petru Soltan (29 June 1931 – 15 July 2016) was a Moldovan mathematician. He was a member of the Academy of Sciences of Moldova and an honorary member of the Romanian Academy. Petru Soltan was a member of the Mathematical Society of Moldova.

Petru Soltan served as member of the Parliament of Moldova (1990–1994) and is a leader of the Democratic Forum of Romanians in Moldova.

He died on 15 July 2016 at the age of 86.

== Awards and honours ==
- Doctor Honoris Causa Babeș-Bolyai University, Cluj-Napoca (1992),
- Doctor Honoris Causa Academy of Economic Studies of Moldova (1998)
- Doctor Honoris Causa al Universităţii Pedagogice de Stat din Tiraspol, cu sediul la Chişinău (2000).
- Doctor Magna cum Laudae al ULIM (1994),
- Honorary Professor Petre Andrei University of Iași (2001).
- Membru titular Academy of Sciences of Moldova (din 1992),
- honorary member Romanian Academy, 1993.
- Om emerit al Republicii Moldova (1994),
- Medals Acad. S. I. Vavilov (Moscova, 1991),
- Medal "Meritul Civic" (1996),
- Medal Mihai Eminescu (2000),
- Medal Dimitrie Cantemir (Academy of Sciences of Moldova, 2001).
- Moldova's National Prize in Science and Technology, 2004

== Bibliography ==
- Enciciclopedia Sovietică moldovenească, Chişinău
- Petru Soltan. Colectiv de autori. Calendarul Naţional, 2001, pp. 139–141
- Gheorghe Rusnac, Valeriu Cozma, Profesorii Universităţii de stat din Moldova. Chişinău, Ed. USM, 2001.
- Tudor Ţopa, Voievozii înspiraţiei, Chişinău, 2007, pp. 42–54.
