= Vasile Șoimaru =

Moldovan politician (born 1949)

Vasile Şoimaru OR
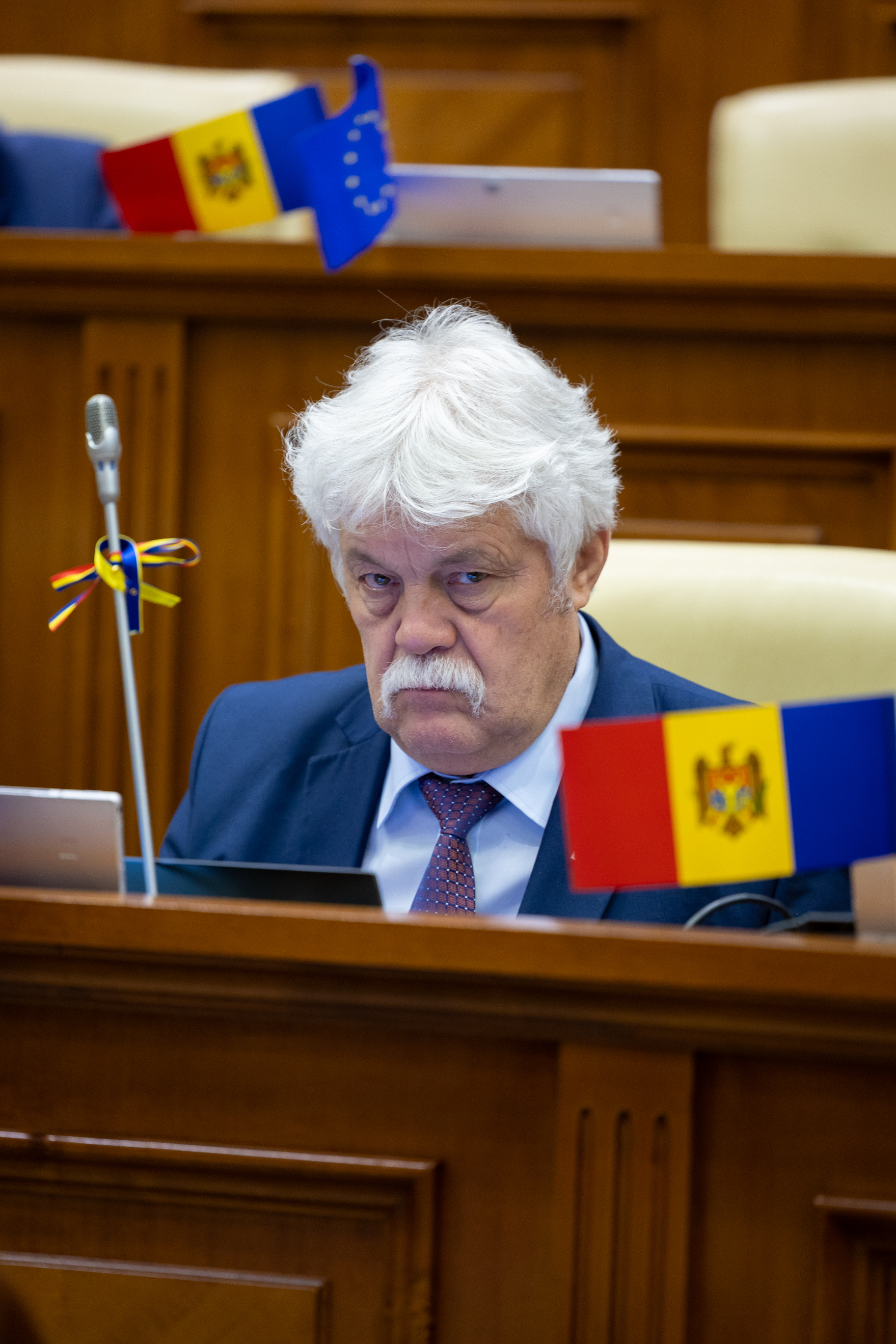
- Șoimaru in 2024

Member of the Moldovan Parliament
- In office 23 July 2021 – 16 October 2025
- Parliamentary group: Party of Action and Solidarity
- In office 22 March 1998 – 20 March 2001
- Parliamentary group: Party of Democratic Forces
- In office 17 April 1990 – 27 February 1994
- Parliamentary group: Popular Front
- Constituency: Ungheni

Personal details
- Born: 30 April 1949 (age 77) Cornova, Moldavian SSR, Soviet Union
- Citizenship: Moldova; Romania
- Party: Popular Front of Moldova
- Other political affiliations: Party of Action and Solidarity
- Education: Technical University of Moldova; Saint Petersburg State University of Economics and Finance
- Profession: economist

Vasile Şoimaru (born 30 April 1949) is a Moldovan politician, economist, professor and photographer.

== Biography ==
=== Professional career ===
An economist by training, Șoimaru worked between 1977 and 1980 at the Faculty of Economics of the State University of Moldova: lecturer, senior lecturer, university lecturer (since 1982), and vice dean. Between 1991 and 1994, he was vice rector of the newly founded Academy of Economic Studies of Moldova (ASEM).

=== Political career ===
He served as member of the Parliament of Moldova from 1990 to 1994 and 1998 to 2001. In 2021, he was again elected as deputy from the Party of Action and Solidarity (PAS), without being a party member.
