= Dumitru Puntea =

Moldovan politician (1943–2009)

Dumitru Puntea OR

Member of the Moldovan Parliament
- In office 1990–1994

Personal details
- Born: July 20, 1943
- Died: December 5, 2009 (aged 66)
- Party: Popular Front of Moldova

Dumitru Puntea (20 July 1943 – 5 December 2009) was a Moldovan politician.

He served as member of the Parliament of Moldova.
