= Ion Bostan (academic) =

Moldovan engineer

Ion Bostan OR
- Born: 31 July 1949 (age 76); Brînza, Moldavian SSR, Soviet Union
- Occupation: Professor
- Employer: Technical University of Moldova
- Known for: Rector of the Technical University of Moldova
- Awards: Order of the Star of Romania; Order of the Republic (Moldova)

Ion Bostan (born 31 July 1949) is a professor and researcher from Moldova. He is a member of the Academy of Sciences of Moldova and was the rector of the Technical University of Moldova.

He is the father of Marcel Ion Bostan, the soloist, keyboards, composer and lyricist.

== Studies ==
- General Secondary Education: Middle School, Cahul City.
- Higher Education: 1966-1971, Polytechnic Institute "S. Lazo "in Chișinău, Faculty of Mechanics.

== Professional and administrative activity ==
- 1971 - 1974 engineer at ″Moldovahidromașina″, Chișinău;
- 1974 - present, engineer, assistant, senior lecturer, professor, Department of Mechanisms and Machine Bodies, Polytechnic Institute of Chisinau (today Technical University of Moldova);
- 1991 - 1992 the head of the Department of Mechanisms and Machine Bodies;
- 1994 - present, president of the Association of Engineers of the Republic of Moldova;
- 1992 - 2015 Rector of the Technical University of Moldova;
- 2004 - 2006 President of the Black Sea Universities Network;
- 2007 - present, President of the Council of Rectors of the Republic of Moldova.

== Awards ==
- Order of the Star of Romania, 2000
- Order of the Republic (Moldova), 1994
- Premiul de Stat în domeniul ştiinţei – 1977 and 1999
- „Inventator Emerit al RM”, „Inventator de Elită al României”
- ordinul „Merite de l’Invention”, Bruxelles: în 1997 – gradul Chevalier, în 1998 – gradul Officier, în 1999 – gradul Comandor
- Medalia de Aur a OMPI, Geneva, 1998
- ordinul pentru ştiinţă „Meritul European”, Bruxelles, 1999.
