= Vasile Nedelciuc =

Moldovan politician

Vasile Nedelciuc OR

Member of the Moldovan Parliament
- In office 10 March 1990 – 20 March 2001
- Parliamentary group: Popular Front; Bloc of Peasants and Intellectuals; Party of Democratic Forces
- Constituency: Chișinău

Personal details
- Born: 13 November 1948 (age 77) Bulboci, Moldavian SSR, Soviet Union

Vasile Nedelciuc (born 13 November 1948) is a Moldovan politician. He served as the chairman of the Foreign Policy Committee of the Parliament of Moldova and the head of the Moldovan Delegation to Europe and vice president of the Parliamentary Assembly of the Council of Europe in Strasbourg. Vasile Nedelciuc is the chairman and co-founder of Endava Moldova (an international IT company). He holds a Ph.D. in computer science from the Moscow Aviation Institute.
