= Natalia Gheorghiu =

Moldovan physician and children's surgeon

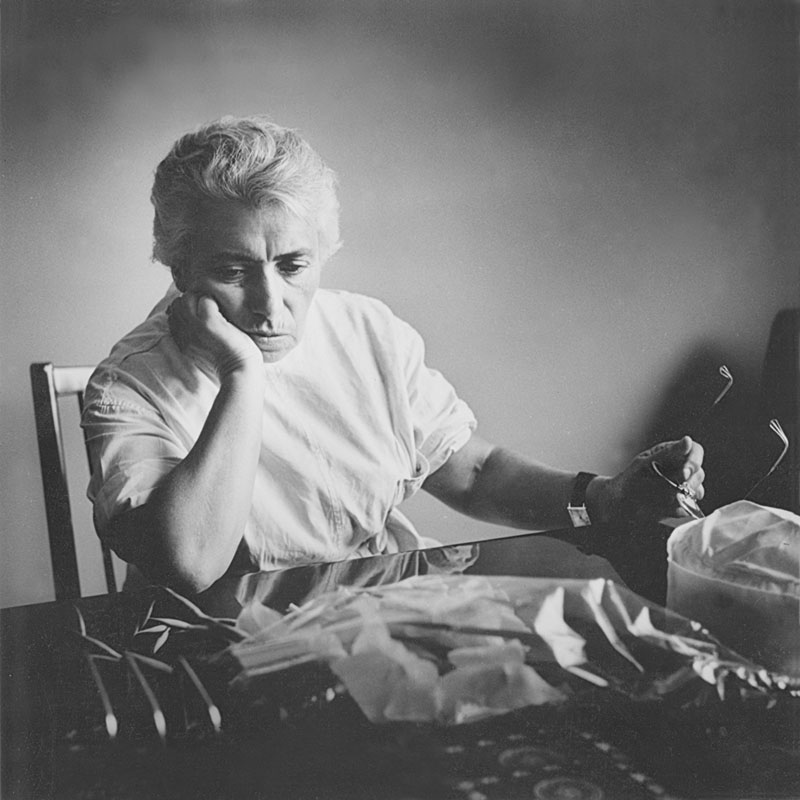
- Gheorghiu in the 1970s
- Born: 29 November 1914; Lisne, Bessarabia Governorate, Russian Empire
- Died: 2 April 2001 (aged 86); Chișinău, Moldova
- Citizenship: Soviet Union
- Education: University of Bucharest
- Known for: traumatology, orthopedics, surgery of the urinary tract, abdominal cavity and thoracic surgery, newborn surgical pathology
- Medical career
- Profession: Pediatric surgeon
- Institutions: Nicolae Testemițanu State University of Medicine and Pharmacy

Natalia Gheorghiu (29 November 1914 – 2 April 2001) was a Moldovan and Soviet pediatric surgeon, physician and professor and doctor of medical sciences. She has been cited as a pioneer of pediatric surgery in Moldova.

Born in the town of Bender (Tighina), she graduated from the Medical Faculty of University of Bucharest in 1940 and began a career in pediatric surgery in Chișinău. The first ward for children opened in the Moldovan Republic hospital in 1957, and later she was instrumental in establishing the Pediatric Surgical Centre, which is now named after her.

She was a professor at the University of Medicine and Pharmacy in Chișinău and authored more than 250 papers into surgical methods, dermatoplasty, and imaging techniques in her field. She was a corresponding member of the Academy of Medical Sciences of the USSR and the Academy of Sciences of Moldova, the International Society of Surgery, and was appointed the president of the Moldavian Surgical Society. A street in the Moldovan capital is named after her and she appeared on a postage stamp in 2004.

== Medical career ==
After graduating with her medical degree from University of Bucharest, she moved to the capital of Moldova, Chișinău, and began her career as a family practitioner and a pediatric surgeon. She was soon recruited as a military surgeon during World War II.

Natalia Gheorghiu made a significant contribution to solving problems in the field of traumatology, orthopedics, surgery of the urinary tract, abdominal cavity and thoracic surgery, in the treatment of diseases of the circulatory system, surgical pathology of the newborn.

Gheorghiu's main scientific and practical interests included plastic surgery, her enormous scientific potential allowed her to make scientific developments at the level of international standards and consistently introduce them into the practice of protecting children's health. Methods of medical diagnosis and treatment of surgical diseases and malformations, developed by Professor Gheorghiu, entered the world pediatric surgery.

Gheorghiu made great efforts to develop pediatric surgery in Moldova, was one of the initiators of the creation of the National Scientific and Practical Center for Pediatric Surgery (currently the Center for Pediatric Surgery "Natalia Gheorghiu").

The N. Gheorghiu School is represented by 6 professors, 15 associated professors, 20 PhD in medical sciences. Natalia Gheorghiu is the author of 650 publications, including 6 monographs.

== Awards ==
For her fruitful work, she was awarded 4 orders and 11 medals, including the Order of the Red Banner of Labour, Friendship of Peoples, the Order of the Republic of Moldova, the Medal of the International Peace Protection Committee, an honorary citizen of Chișinău (1977).

== Memory ==
- In Chișinău, the capital of Moldova, the street in the center of the city (Academician Natalia Georgiou Street) and the secondary school (Lyceum “Natalia Georgiou”) bears her name.
- A bronze bust is installed in front of the Natalia Gheorghiu National Scientific and Practical Center for Pediatric Surgery.
- In November 2004, the Association of Pediatric Surgery named after Academician Natalia Gheorghiu was created in Chisinau.
- On April 30, 2004, in commemoration of the 90th anniversary of the birth of the outstanding surgeon, the Post of Moldova issued a stamp with her image.
- A bust of the figure has been erected on the Alley of Distinguished Doctors and Scientists, next to the Chisinau University of Medicine and Pharmacy. It was created by Moldovan sculptor Veaceslav Jiglițchi.
