= Valentina Ursu =

Moldovan journalist

Valentina Ursu OR
- Education: PhD
- Occupation: Journalist
- Employer: Radio Free Europe
- Known for: journalist Radio Free Europe Chişinău
- Awards: Order of the Republic (Moldova)

Valentina Ursu is a journalist from the Republic of Moldova. She is working for Radio Free Europe Chişinău, and served on the Eurasia Regional Scout Committee representing the Organizația Națională a Scouților din Moldova.

== Awards ==
- Order of the Republic (Moldova) - highest state distinctions (2009)
