= Gheorghe Paladi =

Moldovan obstetrician and gynecologist (1929–2025)

Gheorghe Paladi (9 May 1929 – 13 May 2025) was a Moldovan physician, obstetrician and gynecologist. He practiced obstetrics and gynecology at the Municipal Hospital No. 1 in Chișinău.

Paladi died in Chișinău on 13 May 2025, at the age of 96.

== Honours and legacy ==
In June 2020, the Municipal Hospital No. 1 was renamed the Gheorghe Paladi Municipal Clinical Hospital, with a bust by Moldovan sculptor Veaceslav Jiglițchi being installed in the courtyard.

He was a titular member of the Academy of Sciences of Moldova.
