= Ion Mărgineanu =

Moldovan politician

Ion Mărgineanu OR

Member of the Moldovan Parliament
- In office 10 March 1990 – 27 February 1994
- Constituency: Glodeni

Personal details
- Born: 26 October 1941 (age 84) Fundurii Vechi, Moldavian SSR, Soviet Union
- Party: Popular Front of Moldova

Ion Mărgineanu (born 26 October 1941) is a Moldovan politician.

== Biography ==
He served as member of the Parliament of Moldova.
