= Mihai Cotorobai =

Moldovan politician (1951–2021)

Mihai Cotorobai OR

Judge of the Constitutional Court
- In office 1990–1994

Member of the Moldovan Parliament
- In office 17 April 1990 – 29 March 1994
- Constituency: Ialoveni

Personal details
- Born: 25 March 1951 Puhoi, Moldavian SSR, Soviet Union
- Died: 6 January 2021 (aged 69)
- Party: Popular Front of Moldova

Mihai Cotorobai (25 March 1951 – 6 January 2021) was a Moldovan politician.

== Biography ==
He served as member of the Parliament of Moldova.

Cotorobai died on 6 January 2021, after contracting COVID-19 during the COVID-19 pandemic in Moldova.
