= Ștefan Maimescu =

Moldovan politician and journalist

Ştefan Maimescu OR

Member of the Moldovan Parliament
- In office 17 April 1990 – 27 February 1994
- Constituency: Călărași

Personal details
- Party: Popular Front of Moldova

Ştefan Maimescu is a politician and journalist from the Republic of Moldova.

== Biography ==
In the 1980s, Ştefan Maimescu worked as a correspondent for the Gosteleradio. He served as member of the Parliament of Moldova (1990–1994).
