= Ion Madan =

Moldovan politician (born 1948)

Ion Madan OR

Member of the Moldovan Parliament
- In office 10 March 1990 – 27 February 1994
- Constituency: Chișinău

Personal details
- Party: Popular Front of Moldova

Ion Madan (born 21 March 1948) is a Moldovan politician, who served as member of the Parliament of Moldova (1990 — 1994).

Ion Madan is one of the 278 signatories of the Declaration of Independence of the Republic of Moldova signed on 27 August 1991.

At the time of electing as a deputy, he was working as chief energetician at the "Moldsviazistroi" Trust in Durlești, the suburb of Chișinău. He was elected from the Chişinău constituency.

He is a member of the "National Council of the Union 1991", member of the council and deputy chairman of the "Parliament - 90" Public Association of the Republic of Moldova.

== Awards and honours ==
- The "Meritul Civic" medal (1996)
- Order of the Republic Moldova (2012)
