= Veaceslav Țurcan =

Moldovan lawyer and human rights activist (1965–2021)

Veaceslav Țurcan OR
- Born: 31 August 1965
- Died: 10 March 2021 (aged 55); Chișinău, Moldova
- Occupations: Lawyer and human rights defender

Veaceslav Țurcan (31 August 1965 – 10 March 2021) was a Moldovan lawyer and human rights activist in Moldova, including in its breakaway region of Transnistria.

== Biography ==
Țurcan has practiced the profession of a lawyer since 1994 in the city of Râbnița, but he subsequently continued to work in Chișinău. He has led the initiative to create Amnesty International Moldova and was among its founders.

Țurcan has held a number of positions within the Moldovan Bar Association of Chișinău Țurcan. Between 2007 and 2011 he has been a member of the Ethics and Discipline Committee of the Moldovan Bar Association. After that, between 2011-2015 Țurcan has been the head of the Censor Committee of the Moldovan Bar Association. Finally, he has been a member of the Council of the Bar Association between 2018 and 2020.

Țurcan specialized in criminal cases, particularly those related to exposing torture, inhuman and degrading treatment. In the case of Gurgurov v. Moldova where Țurcan was counsel, the European Court of Human Rights made the highest non-pecuniary award in regard to torture cases relating to the Republic of Moldova. There have also been other noteworthy cases brought regarding different criminal cases.

Țurcan was known for representing, together with lawyer Valeriu Pleșca, the interests of Valeriu Boboc, a victim that died during the riots in Chișinău on the April 2009 Moldovan parliamentary election protests.

Țurcan was also counsel for applicants before the European Court of Human Rights in other high profile cases such as the issue of the Romanian-language schools in Transnistria, under the jurisdiction of Moldova. Catan and Bobeico are 2 distinct cases of this that stand out. Țurcan had already worked on cases related to Transnistria long before, among many other issues.

In 2017, Țurcan was awarded the United Nations (UN) General Award for an Outstanding Human Rights Achievement in 2017 for the "promotion of respect for civil and political rights and providing professional human rights training for lawyers from Moldova, including Transnistrian region".

In his last years, Țurcan was subject to illegal criminal charges for his professional activity in his capacity of a lawyer. Ultimately, the Supreme Court of Justice of Moldova, as well as the Bălți Court of Appeals and the Drochia county court, have all cleared him of all charges with full rehabilitation.

On 10 March 2021, Veaceslav Țurcan died in Chișinău from complications of COVID-19 during the COVID-19 pandemic in Moldova.

On 15 October 2021, he was awarded the Republican Award (Romanian: Ordinul Republicii) post-mortem by the President of Moldova Maia Sandu.

Other

Veaceslav Țurcan was also one of the founding members of the ”Human Rights Embassy” NGO in 2011.
