= Ilie Bratu =

Moldovan politician (born 1948)

Ilie Bratu OR

Member of the Moldovan Parliament
- In office 17 April 1990 – 27 February 1994
- Parliamentary group: Popular Front
- Constituency: Strășeni

Personal details
- Born: 14 October 1948 (age 77) Slobozia Mare, Moldavian SSR, Soviet Union
- Other political affiliations: Popular Front of Moldova
- Profession: Engineer

Ilie Bratu (born 14 October 1948) is a Moldovan politician.

== Biography ==
Between 1990 and 1994, he was a member of the Parliament of the Republic of Moldova, being one of the 278 deputies who signed the Declaration of Independence of the Republic of Moldova.

== Distinctions and decorations ==
- Order of the Republic (2012)
- The "Civic Merit" Medal (1996)
