= Ion Munteanu =

Moldovan politician

Ion Munteanu OR
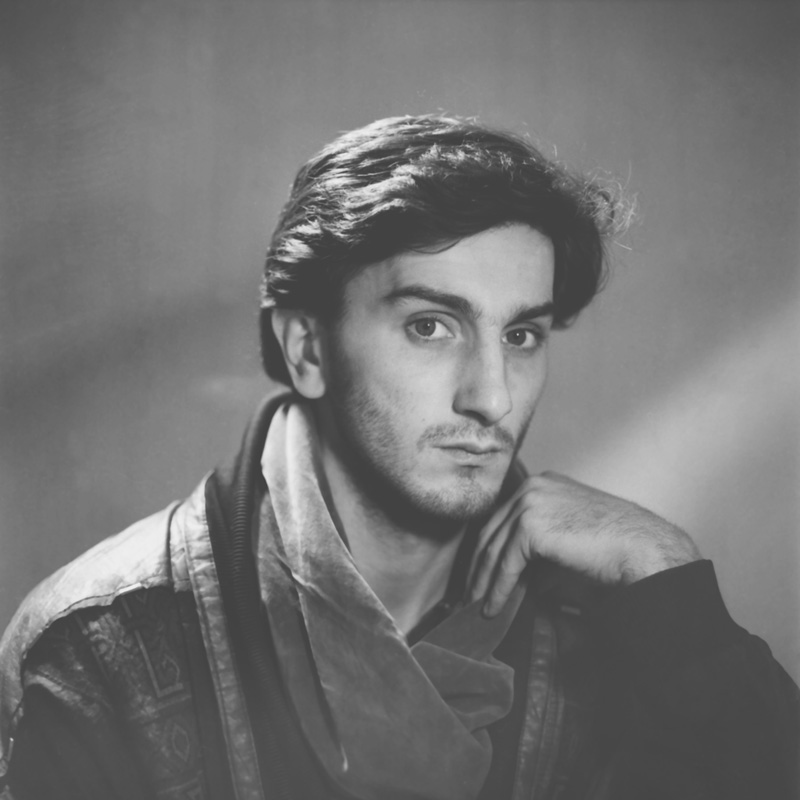

Member of the Moldovan Parliament
- In office 1990–1994

Personal details
- Born: 15 February 1962 (age 64)
- Party: Popular Front of Moldova
- Other political affiliations: Democratic Party of Moldova
- Children: Elena Muntean
- Profession: Politician, businessman

Ion Munteanu is a Moldovan politician and businessman.

== Biography ==
He served as member of the Parliament of Moldova.
