= Petru Muntean =

Moldovan politician

Petru Munteanu OR

Member of the Moldovan Parliament
- In office 1990–1994

Personal details
- Party: Popular Front of Moldova

Petru Munteanu is a Moldovan politician.

He served as member of the Parliament of Moldova.
