= Sergiu Chircă =

Moldovan politician

Sergiu Chircă OR

Member of the Moldovan Parliament
- In office 1990–1994

Personal details
- Born: 10 October 1934 (age 91)
- Party: Popular Front of Moldova

Sergiu Ion Chircă (born 10 October 1934) is a Moldovan politician.

== Biography ==
He served as member of the Parliament of Moldova and is a leader of the Democratic Forum of Romanians in Moldova.
