= Nicolae Todos =

Moldovan politician (1935–2025)

Nicolae Todos OR

Member of the Moldovan Parliament
- In office 17 March 1990 – 27 February 1994
- Constituency: Cahul

Personal details
- Born: 15 November 1935 Andrușul de Sus, Kingdom of Romania
- Died: 15 August 2025 (aged 89)

Nicolae Todos (15 November 1935 – 18 August 2025) was a Moldovan politician.

== Life and career ==
Todos served as a deputy during the first Parliament of the Republic of Moldova. He was signatory of the Declaration of Independence.

Todos was decorated by President Nicolae Timofti in 2012 with the Order of the Republic.

Todos died on 18 August 2025, at the age of 89.
