= Eugen Pâslaru =

Moldovan politician (1950–2018)

Eugen Pîslaru OR

Member of the Moldovan Parliament
- In office 17 April 1990 – 29 March 1994
- Constituency: Căușeni

Personal details
- Born: 30 December 1950 Costiceni, Ukrainian SSR, Soviet Union
- Party: Popular Front of Moldova

Eugen Pîslaru (30 December 1950 – 7 August 2018) was a Moldovan politician.

== Biography ==
Eugen Pâslaru was born on 30 December 1950 in Costiceni, a village in the commune of Chernivtsi Oblast (province) in the western Ukraine. He served as member of the first Parliament of Moldova and in 1991, was a signatory to the Declaration of Independence of the Republic of Moldova. He is also the founder of Sălcuța winery, which he founded in 1995. He served in the Transnistria War which occurred between 2 March – 21 July 1992. He was president of the Căușeni District.
