= Ion Palii =

Moldovan politician

Ion Palii OR

Member of the Moldovan Parliament
- In office 17 April 1990 – 27 February 1994
- Constituency: Cahul

Personal details
- Party: Popular Front of Moldova

Ion Palii is a Moldovan politician.

He served as member of the Parliament of Moldova.
