= Dumitru Postovan =

Moldovan politician (born 1949)

Dumitru Postovan OR

1st Prosecutor General of Moldova
- In office 1990 – 30 July 1998
- Succeeded by: Valeriu Catană

Personal details
- Party: Popular Front of Moldova

Dumitru Postovan (born 19 September 1949) is a Moldovan jurist and politician. He was the first General Prosecutor of Moldova (1990–1998).

== Biography ==
He served as member of the Parliament of Moldova, representing Criuleni District. There was another MP with the same name and surname, representing Drochia District.
