= Victor Berlinschi =

Moldovan politician

Victor Berlinschi OR

Member of the Moldovan Parliament
- In office 1990–1994

Personal details
- Party: Popular Front of Moldova

Victor Berlinschi is a Moldovan politician. He served as a member of the first Parliament of Moldova, elected from Chișinău. He later served as president of the Judecătoriei popular a raionului Sovietic (transl. People's Court of the Soviet District).
