= Domnica Darienco =

Soviet and Moldovan actress

Domnica Darienco OR PAU
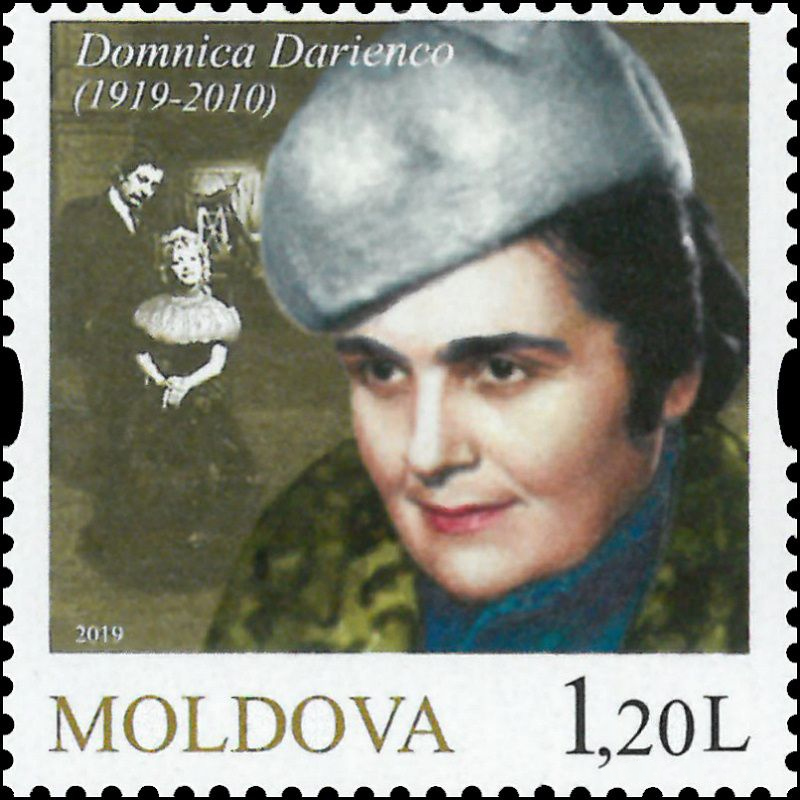
- Darienco on a 2019 stamp of Moldova
- Born: 15 January 1919; Valehoțulove, Ukrainian People's Republic (now Dolynske, Ukraine)
- Died: 6 November 2010 (aged 91); Chișinău, Moldova
- Resting place: Central Cemetery, Chișinău
- Occupation: Actress
- Years active: 1937–1989
- Awards: People's Artist of the USSR (1974); Order of the Red Banner of Labour; Order of the Republic (1994)

Domnica Darienco (Russian: Домникия Тимофеевна Дариенко, romanized: Domnikiya Timofeevna Darienko; 15 January 1919 – 6 November 2010) was a Soviet and Moldovan stage and film actress. She received the title of People's Artist of the USSR in 1974.

== Early life and education ==
Darienco was born on 15 January 1919 in the village of Valehoțulove in the Ananyevsky Uyezd of the Kherson Governorate (now Dolynske, Valea Hoțului, located in Ukraine). She studied theatrical acting at the Odessa Theatre School, graduating in 1937.

She was married, and her husband was killed on the frontlines during World War II.

== Career ==
In 1937, Darienco joined the A.S. Pushkin Dramatic Theatre (presently the Mihai Eminescu National Theatre), which was then located in Tiraspol before relocating to Chișinău in 1944. She made her stage debut as Kruchinina in Alexander Ostrovsky's Guilty Without Guilt. During her career, she appeared in over 100 theatrical productions. Her roles included Aftenia in Ion Creangă's The Mother-in-Law with Three Daughters-in-Law, Corina in Vasile Alecsandri's Ovidiu, and Vasilisa in Maxim Gorky's The Lower Depths.

She made her film debut in 1954 in Andrieș, produced by the Dovzhenko Film Studios. She later performed in the 1962 film Armaghedon.

Darienco retired from acting in 1989. Following her retirement, she served as the president of the League of Stage Veterans in the Republic of Moldova from 1992 to 2004.

== Honours and legacy ==
Darienco received the title of People's Artist of the Moldavian SSR in 1957 and was named a People's Artist of the USSR in 1974. Following the independence of Moldova, she was awarded the Order of the Republic in 1994, the country's highest state honor.

In 2008, Darienco was honored at a commemorative event in Chișinău attended by fellow artists and the composer Saveliu Cojocaru.

Darienco died on 6 November 2010 and was buried at the Central Cemetery in Chișinău.

== Selected filmography ==
- Andrieș (1954)
- Beyond the City Limits (1960)
- Armaghedon (1962)
- The Last Haiduc (1972)
- Between Sky and Earth (1975)
