= Mihail Druță =

Moldovan politician (born 1957)

Mihail Druță MP OR
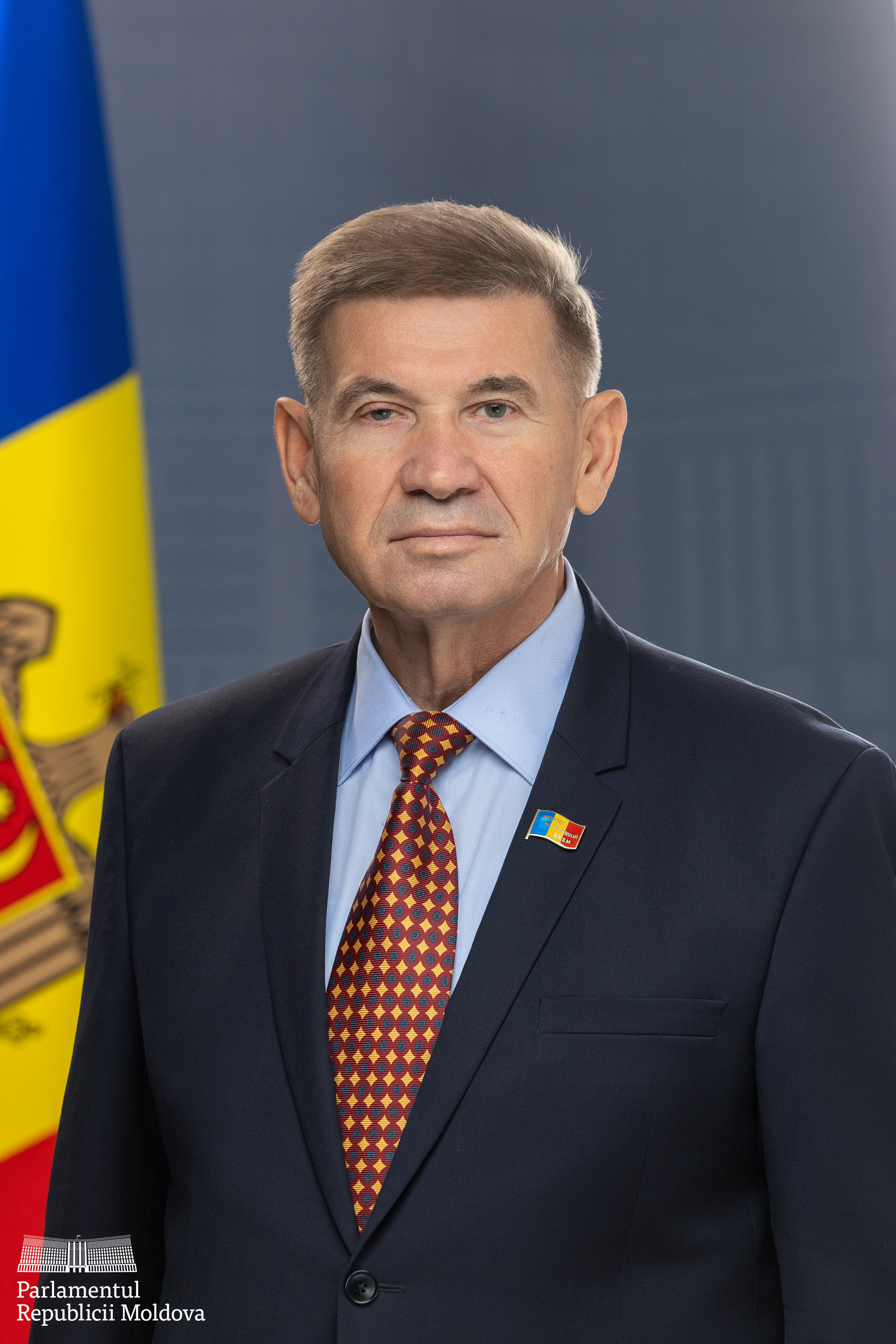
- Official portrait, 2025

Member of the Moldovan Parliament
- Incumbent
- Assumed office 23 July 2021
- Parliamentary group: Party of Action and Solidarity
- In office 17 April 1990 – 29 March 1994
- Parliamentary group: Popular Front
- Constituency: Lazo

Personal details
- Born: 2 June 1957 (age 69) Mașcăuți, Moldavian SSR, Soviet Union
- Education: Moldova State University

Military service
- Rank: Lieutenant colonel

Mihail Druță (born 2 June 1957) is a Moldovan historian and politician. He is currently Member of the Moldovan Parliament for PAS.
