= Ion Iovcev =

Ion Iovcev OR
- Born: 12 June 1951 (age 74); Găvănoasa, Moldavian SSR, Soviet Union
- Occupation: Teacher
- Known for: principal of a Romanian language school in Tiraspol
- Awards: Order of the Republic

Ion Iovcev (born 12 June 1951) is a teacher from the Republic of Moldova. Since 1992, he has been the principal of a Romanian language school in Tiraspol and active advocate for human rights as well as a critic of the Transnistrian leadership. Ion Iovcev was decorated, by a presidential decree, with Moldova's highest state decoration – the Order of the Republic.

In November 2005 Ion Iovcev received threatening calls that he attributed to his criticism of the separatist regime.

== Awards ==
- Order of the Republic - highest state distinction

== See also ==
- Human rights in Transnistria
- Romanian-language schools in Transnistria
