= Ion Negură =

Moldovan politician

Ion Negură OR

Member of the Moldovan Parliament
- In office 1990–1994

Personal details
- Party: Popular Front of Moldova

Ion Negură is a Moldovan politician and professor at Moldova State University.

== Biography ==
He served as member of the Parliament of Moldova.
