= Ion Borșevici =

Moldovan diplomat (1929–2011)

Ion Borşevici OR

Member of the Moldovan Parliament
- In office 1990–1994

Personal details
- Born: 21 March 1929
- Died: 7 June 2011 (aged 82)
- Party: Popular Front of Moldova

Ion Borşevici (21 March 1929 – 7 June 2011) was a Moldovan diplomat. Ambassador Extraordinary and Plenipotentiary of Moldova to Ukraine.

He served as a member of the Parliament of Moldova.
