= Lorena Bogza =

Moldovan journalist

Lorena Bogza OR
- Born: 23 April 1971 (age 54); Piatra Neamț, Neamț County, Romania
- Occupation: Journalist
- Employer: Pro TV
- Known for: Journalist ProTV Chișinău
- Awards: Order of the Republic (Moldova)

Lorena Bogza (born 23 April 1971) is a journalist from the Republic of Moldova. She has been working for Pro TV since 1996.

== Awards ==
- Order of the Republic (Moldova) – highest state distinction (2009)
