= Nicolae Misail =

Moldovan politician

Member of the Moldovan Parliament
- In office 1990–1994

Personal details
- Party: Popular Front of Moldova

Nicolae Misail is a Moldovan politician.

== Biography ==
He served as member of the Parliament of Moldova.
