= Mihai Dimitriu =

Moldovan politician

Mihai Dimitriu OR

Member of the Moldovan Parliament
- In office 1990–1994

Personal details
- Party: Popular Front of Moldova

Mihai Dimitriu is a Moldovan politician.

== Biography ==
He served as member of the Parliament of Moldova.
