= Tudor Țopa =

Moldovan politician (born 1932)

Tudor Țopa OR

Member of the Moldovan Parliament
- In office 10 March 1990 – 27 February 1994
- Parliamentary group: Popular Front
- Constituency: Rezina

Personal details
- Born: 13 October 1932 (age 93) Chițcanii Vechi, Kingdom of Romania
- Party: Popular Front of Moldova
- Education: Moldova State University (1957)

Tudor Țopa (born 13 October 1932) is a Moldovan publicist.

== Biography ==
He served as member of the Parliament of Moldova.

== Bibliography ==
- Petru Soltan. Colectiv de autori. Calendarul Național-2002, Ed. BNRM, Chișinău, 2002, 277-279
- Andrei Calcea. Personalități orheiene. Chișinău, Ed. Pontos, 2003
- Literatura și Arta Moldovei. Enciclopedie, vol.2
