= Făleștii Noi =

- Commune
- Location within Moldova
- Coordinates: 47.5572222222°N 27.7427777778°E
- Country: Moldova
- District: Fălești District

Government
  - Mayor: Bejenaru Vladimir

Population (2014)
  - Total: 2,067
- Time zone: UTC+2 (EET)
  - Summer (DST): UTC+3 (EEST)

Făleștii Noi is a commune in Făleşti District, Moldova. It is composed of two villages, Făleștii Noi and Pietrosul Nou.
