= Ada Zevin =

Moldovan painter (1918–2005)

Ada Zevin OR
- 1959 self portrait
- Born: 3 September 1918; Chișinău, Kingdom of Romania
- Died: 23 September 2005 (aged 87); Chișinău, Moldova
- Occupation: artist
- Known for: art, commemorative coin in her honor

Ada Zevin (3 September 1918 – 23 September 2005) was a Moldovan expressionist painter. Moldova issued a commemorative coin in her honor

== Life ==
Zevin was born in Chișinău, Moldova in 1918. From 1938 to 1940 she studied at the Academy of Fine Arts in Bucharest Romania

She had solo exhibitions at the National Museum of Fine Arts in Chisinau, Moldova in 1960, 1970 and 1980.

Zevin died in Chișinău in 2005. She had a solo exhibition at the United Nations in Chisinau, Moldova. In 2018 a commemorative coin was minted as part of the famous women series, to celebrate the centenary of her birth. An exhibition in her honor was organised at Moldova's National Museum of Art.

In 2024 her work was included in 14 masters in an exhibition "The colors of 'thaw'. The Bessarabian village in the painting of the 1960s".
