= Eva Gudumac =

Moldovan politician (born 1941)

Eva Gudumac OR

Member of the Moldovan Parliament
- In office 13 March 2001 – 22 April 2009
- Parliamentary group: Braghiș Alliance; Party of Communists

Personal details
- Born: 6 May 1941 (age 85) Tătărăuca Veche, Moldavian SSR, Soviet Union
- Education: Russian State Medical University; Chișinău State Institute of Medicine

Eva Gudumac (born 6 May 1941) is a Moldovan specialist in pediatric surgery and politician. Full member of Moldova Academy of Sciences, member of Parliament of Moldova in 2001–2009, recipient of the Order of the Republic.
