= Mihail Cibotaru =

Moldovan writer and politician (1934–2021)

Mihail Cibotaru OR

Minister of Culture
- In office 5 April 1994 – 24 January 1997
- President: Mircea Snegur; Petru Lucinschi
- Prime Minister: Andrei Sangheli
- Preceded by: Ion Ungureanu (as Minister of Culture and Cults)
- Succeeded by: Ghenadie Ciobanu

Personal details
- Born: 21 June 1934 Vărvăreuca, Kingdom of Romania
- Died: 20 January 2021 (aged 86) Chișinău, Moldova

Mihail Cibotaru (21 June 1934 – 20 January 2021) was a Moldovan writer, publicist and politician. He served as the Minister of Culture of Moldova from 1994 to 1997.
