= Iachim Grosul =

Moldovan scientist (1912-1976)

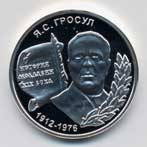
- Born: 21 September 1912; Caragaș, Slobozia District, Tiraspol uezd, Kherson Governorate, Russian Empire
- Died: 28 September 1976 (aged 64); Chişinău, Moldovan SSR, Soviet Union

Iachim Sergheevici Grosul (also rendered as Yakim Grosul; 21 September 1912 – 28 September 1976) was a Moldovan scientist, and the first president of the Academy of Science of the Moldavian SSR in the Soviet Union (1961-1976).

== Biography ==
He was born in the village of Caragaş, Slobozia county. In 1937, he graduated from the Pedagogic Institute in Tiraspol. After this, he worked at the Institute as lecturer in history. He joined the Communist Party in 1939. In 1940 he became dean of the History Department. From 1947, he was vice director, and from 1954, he was president of the Moldavian section of the USSR Academy of Sciences. In 1961, he was elected as the first president of the new Academy of Science of the Moldavian Soviet Socialist Republic. He was a good organiser, scientist and historian. Grosul developed and edited the Enciclopedia Republici Sovietice Socialiste Moldoveneşti, an eight-volume encyclopedia published between 1964 and 1981. He is noted for his book on the economic development of Bessarabia under Russian rule in the 19th century. However, his works relating to history, were many times censured, a common practice in the marxist dogmatic Soviet Union.

Iachim Grosul died on 28 September 1976, in Chișinău. He was buried in the Central Orthodox Cemetery in Chișinău and there is a gray granite monument with the image of the academician carved in the haut-relief technique, made by the sculptor Lazar Dubinovschi.

In 2004, his image and name were used on a silver coin minted by Central Bank of Transnistria to honor this native of what today is Transnistria, as part of a series of memorable coins called "The Outstanding People of Pridnestrovie".
