= Dumitru Moțpan =

President of the Moldovan Parliament from 1997 to 1998

Dumitru Moțpan OR

3rd President of the Moldovan Parliament
- In office 5 March 1997 – 23 April 1998
- President: Petru Lucinschi
- Prime Minister: Ion Ciubuc
- Preceded by: Petru Lucinschi
- Succeeded by: Dumitru Diacov

Leader of the Democratic Agrarian Party
- In office 19 October 1991 – 21 April 1998
- Succeeded by: Anatolie Popușoi

Vice President of the Moldovan Parliament
- In office 29 March 1994 – 5 March 1997
- President: Mircea Snegur; Petru Lucinschi
- Prime Minister: Andrei Sangheli; Ion Ciubuc
- Speaker: Petru Lucinschi

Member of the Moldovan Parliament
- In office 10 March 1990 – 21 April 1998
- Parliamentary group: Democratic Agrarian Party
- Constituency: Fălești

Personal details
- Born: 3 May 1940 Seliște, Kingdom of Romania
- Died: 23 June 2018 (aged 78) Chișinău, Moldova

Dumitru Moțpan (3 May 1940 – 23 June 2018) was a Moldovan politician, who served as the President of the Moldovan Parliament. He died on June 23, 2018.
