= Vasile Vatamanu =

Moldovan politician (1955–2011)

Vasile Vatamanu OR

Member of the Moldovan Parliament
- In office 17 April 1990 – 29 March 1994
- Constituency: Căinari

Personal details
- Born: Cuhureștii de Jos, Moldavian SSR, Soviet Union
- Died: 19 December 2011 Codreanca, Moldova
- Party: Liberal party of Moldova
- Spouse: Larisa Vatamanu
- Children: Victor Vatamanu, Cristina Vatamanu, Ion Vatamanu
- Profession: Journalist

Vasile Vatamanu (24 March 1955 – 19 December 2011) was a Moldovan politician.

He served as member of the Parliament of Moldova.
