= Dumitru Noroc =

Moldovan politician (1933–2020)

Dumitru Noroc (10 November 1933 – 18 November 2020) was a Moldovan politician who served as a Deputy.
