= Mihai Petric =

Moldovan artist (1923–2005)

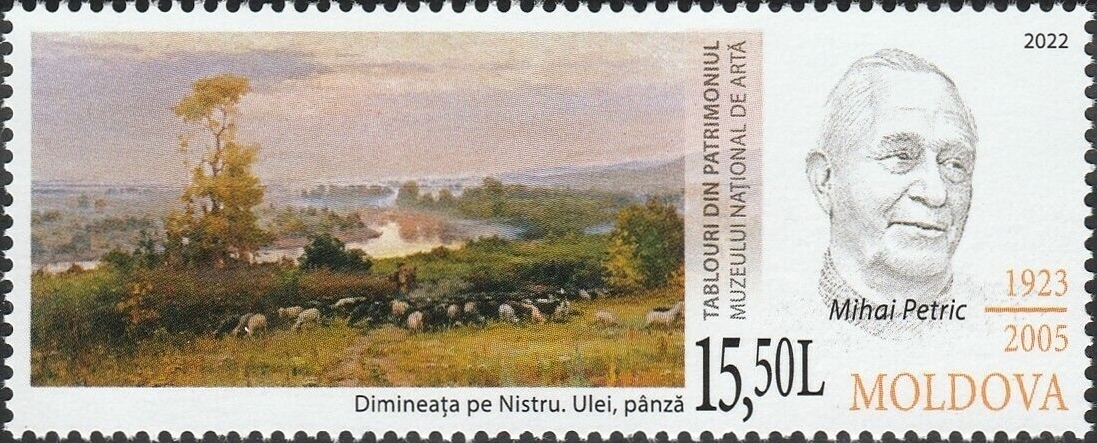
Petric and his work on a 2022 stamp of Moldova

Mihai Petric (7 March 1923 – 15 June 2005) was a Moldovan painter. He studied at the "I. Repin" National School of Fine Arts in Chişinău and at the Institute of Fine Arts in Kiev, Ukraine. He was the creator of "Road to Codru" (oil on canvas, 1959), "Dniestr at Dusk" (oil on canvas, 1980), and "White Frost" (oil on canvas, 1987).
