= Vladimir Andrunakievich =

Soviet and Moldovan mathematician

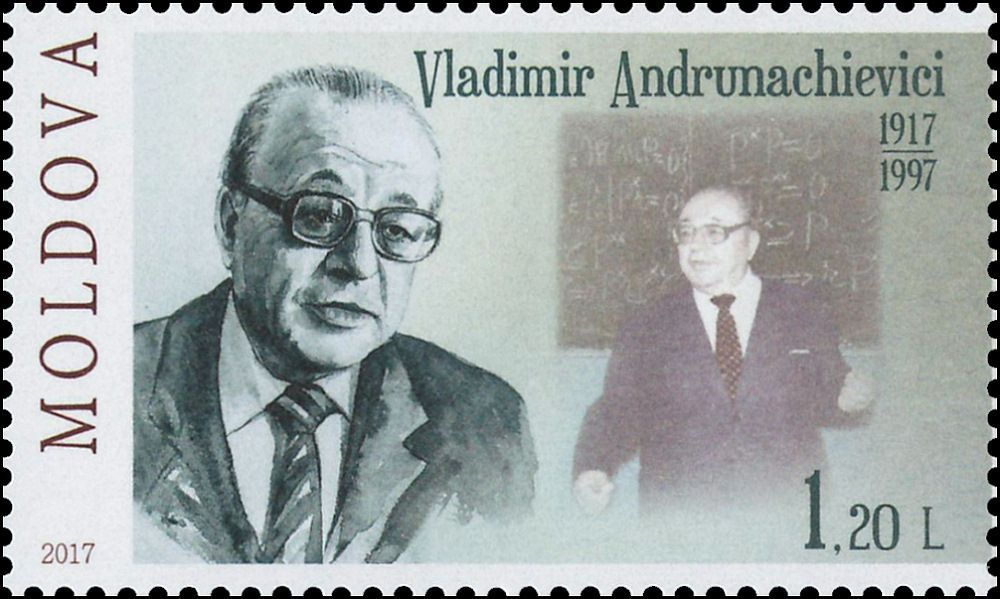
Andrunakievich on a 2017 stamp of Moldova

Vladimir Aleksandrovich Andrunakievich (Russian: Владимир Александрович Андрунакиевич; 3 April 1917 – 22 July 1997) was a Soviet and Moldovan mathematician, known for his work in abstract algebra. He was a doctor of physical and mathematical sciences (1958), academician (1961) and vice-president (1964—1969, 1979—1990) of the Moldavian Soviet Academy of Sciences. Laureate of the State Prize of the Moldavian SSR (1972).

Andrunakievich was born in Petrograd and he graduated from the Faculty of Mathematics at the University of Iași. He received his Ph.D. from the Moscow State University in 1947 under the supervision of Aleksandr Gennadievich Kurosh and Otto Schmidt.

== Monographs ==
- Radicals of algebras and structure theory (with Iu. M. Ryabukhin). Moscow: Nauka, 1979.
- Numbers and ideals (with I. D. Chirtoaga). Kishinev: Lumina, 1980.
- Applied problems of solid mechanics. Kishinev: Ştiinţa, 1985.
- Modules, algebras and topologies. Kishinev: Ştiinţa, 1988.
- Constructions of topological rings and modules (with V. I. Arnautov). Kishinev: Ştiinţa, 1988.

== Articles ==
- Andrunakievich, Vladimir Aleksandrovich; Ryabukhin, Yuriĭ Mikhaĭlovich (1978). "Complementary and dual torsions". Trudy Mat. Inst. Steklov. 148: 16–26. MR 0558936.
