= Academy of Sciences of Moldova =

Scientific organization of Moldova

- Academia de Științe a Moldovei
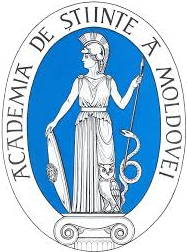

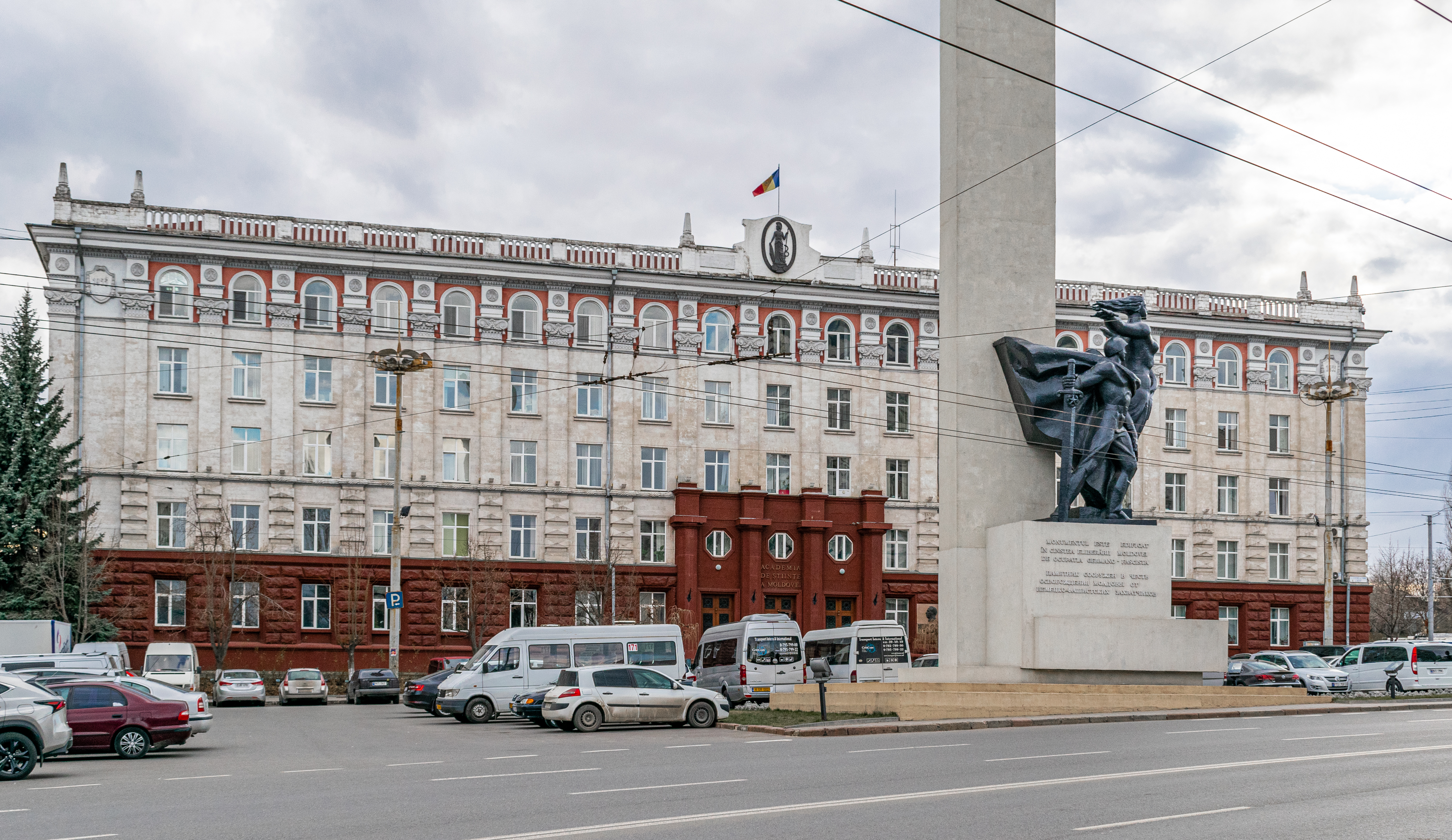
- Headquarters in Chișinău
- Formation: 1961
- Legal status: active
- Purpose: advocate and public voice, educator and network
- Headquarters: 1 Stephen the Great Boulevard, Chișinău, Moldova
- Official language: Romanian language
- President: Ion Tighineanu
- Website: official website

The Academy of Sciences of Moldova (Romanian: Academia de Științe a Moldovei), established in 1961, is the main scientific organization of Moldova and coordinates research in all areas of science and technology. Ion Tighineanu has been the president of the Academy of Sciences since 9 April 2019.

== History ==
As early as June 1946, the Presidium of the USSR Academy of Sciences decided to establish the Moldovan Research Base of the USSR Academy of Sciences in Chisinau. In October 1949, the research base was transformed into the Moldavian branch of the USSR Academy of Sciences. The grand opening of the Academy took place on August 2, 1961. A meeting of the Academy of Sciences of Moldova in September 1994 confirms the reasoned scientific opinion of philologists that the correct name of the state language of Moldova is Romanian. Since September 2009, the University at the Academy of Sciences of Moldova has been operating in the country. In October 2017, President Igor Dodon signed a law that provides for the reform of the Academy of Sciences of Moldova.

== Organization and departments ==
- Management
  - President: Ion Tighineanu
  - Vice Presidents: Eva Gudumac, Svetlana Cojocaru and Ion Hadârcă.
  - Chief Scientific Secretary: Liliana Condraticova
- Scientific departments:
  - Biological, chemical and environmental sciences
  - Medical Sciences
  - Physical and Engineering Sciences
  - Economic sciences
  - Humanities and Arts
  - Agricultural Sciences

== Liberation Monument ==
On 23 August 1969, during the 25th anniversary of the Jassy–Kishinev Offensive, the Liberation Monument at the Academy of Sciences was opened. It has been renovated two times, in 1975 and 2019. In 2014, a demolition of it was considered. Architects Vladimir Naumov, Naum Epelbaum and Lazar Dubinovskiy were part of the project.

== Presidents ==
- Iachim Grosul (1961–1976)
- Alexandru Jucenco (1977–1989)
- Andrei Andrieș (1989–2004)
- Gheorghe Duca (2004–2019)
- Ion Tighineanu (2019–present)

== Gallery ==
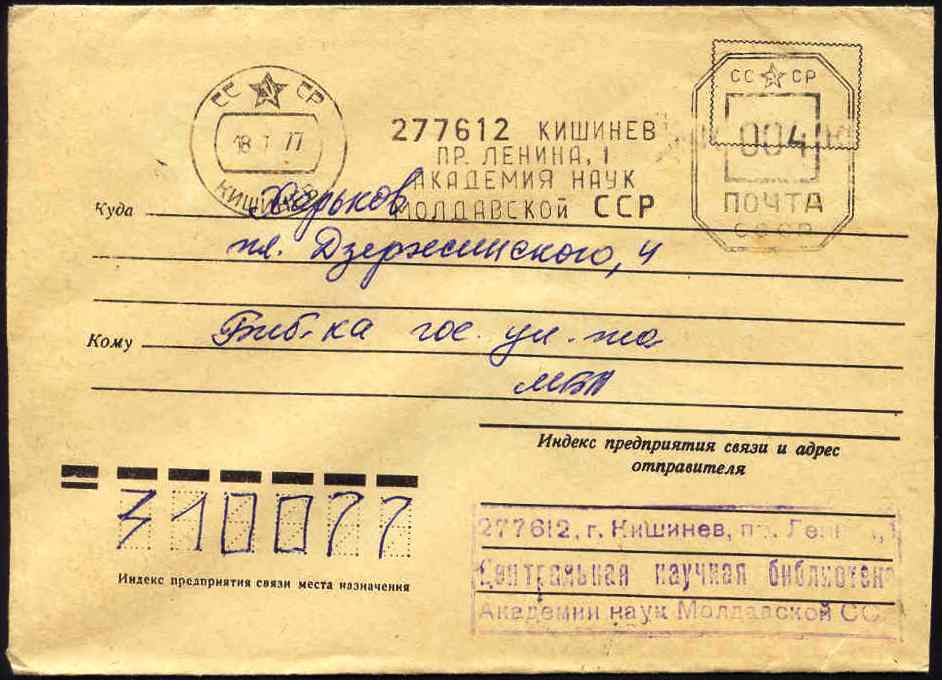

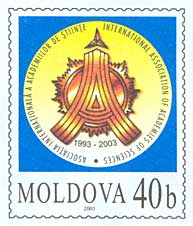

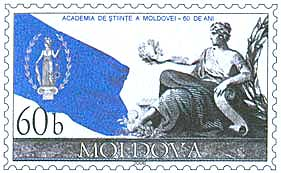

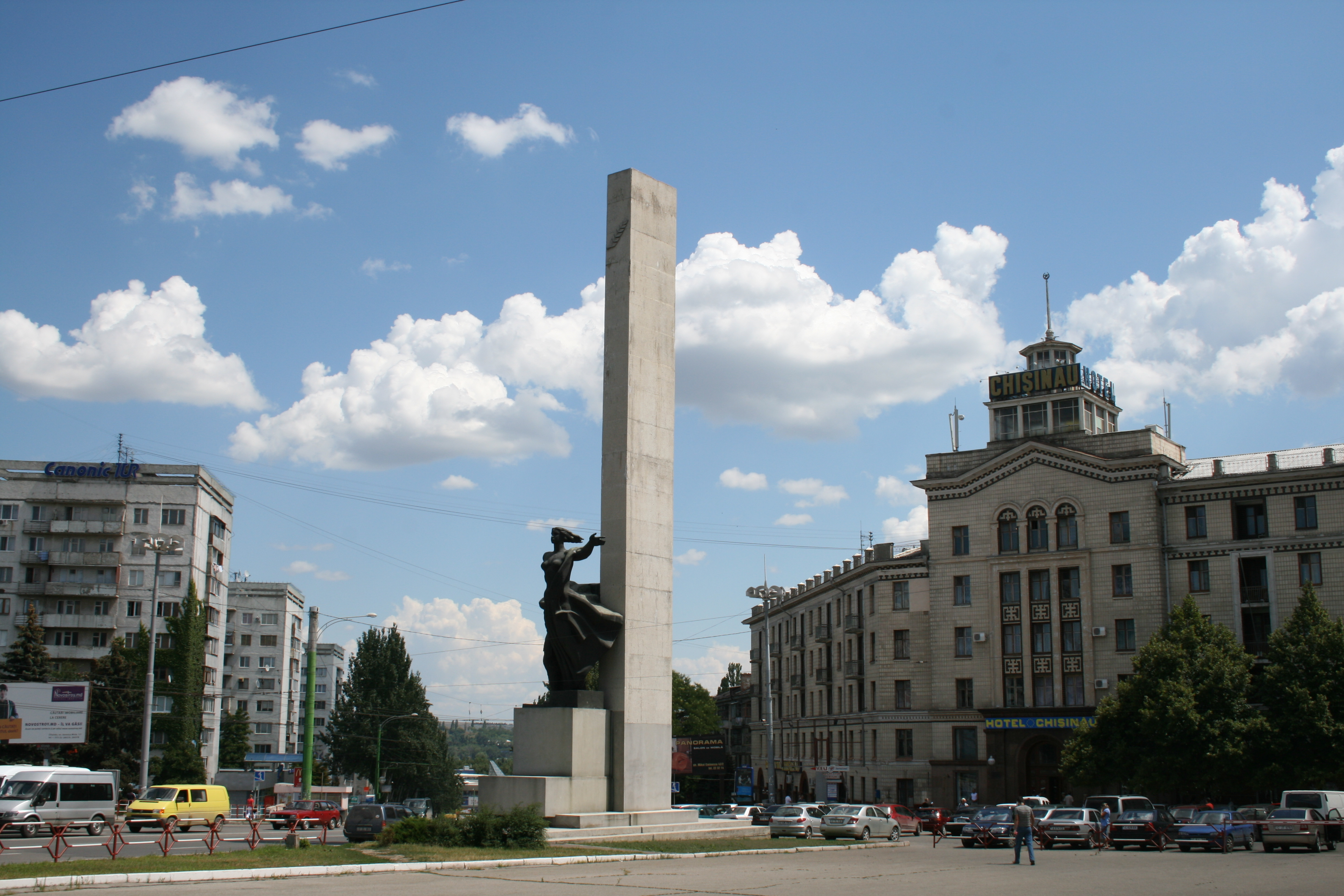
The Liberation Monument
