= Committee for State Security of the Moldavian Soviet Socialist Republic =

Committee for State Security of the Moldavian Soviet Socialist Republic (Russian: Комитет государственной безопасности Mолдавской ССР), also referred to as the KGB of the MSSR or the CSS of Moldavia, was the security agency of the Moldavian Soviet Socialist Republic, being the local branch of Committee for State Security of the USSR. On 9 September 1991, the KGB of the MSSR was transformed into the Ministry of National Security (now, the Information and Security Service of the Republic of Moldova). Established in 1954, its rights were limited by the early 1960s, with the KGB border guard, once subordinated to the Moldavian KGB, reported directly to party leaders in Moscow. From July 1972 to its disbandment, the KGB was part of the Council of Ministers of the MSSR. From 1940 to 1991, all chairmen of the KGB were army generals. Today, modern Moldovan intelligence services are mostly based on the structure of the KGB, specifically its 5th Division.

== Structure ==
Structure:

- Leadership (chairman, vice chairs, party committee)
- Secretariat
- 1st Division (intelligence)
- 2nd Division (counterintelligence)
- 4th Division (secret-political)
- 5th Division (economic)
- 7th Division (surveillance)
- 8th Division (encryption-decryption)
- 9th Division (protection of party and government leaders)
- 2nd Special Department
- 3rd Special Department
- 4th Special Department
- 5th Special Department
- Manufacturing Department
- Communication Department
- Investigation Department
- Archive Department
- Prison Department
- Human Resources Department
- Mobilization Department
- Auxiliary units

== Notable people investigated by the KGB ==
- Alexandru Şoltoianu – Founder of the National Patriotic Front
- Gheorghe Ghimpu – Romanian politician and political prisoner
- Valeriu Graur
- Alexandru Usatiuc-Bulgăr
- Sergiu Rădăuţan – Rector of the Chişinău Polytechnical Institute
- Nicolae Testemiţanu – Rector of the Chişinău State Medical Institute
- Boris Alexandru Găină – First Secretary of the Teleneshty Regional Committee of the CPM

== Chairmen ==
- Iosif Mordovets (May 6, 1954 – March 30, 1955)
- Andrei Prokopenko (March 30, 1955 – July 11, 1959)
- Ivan Savchenko (1959–1967)
- Piotr Chvertko (1967–1975)
- Arkady Ragozin (December 17, 1975 – January 19, 1979)
- Gavriil Volkov (January 19, 1979 – January 23, 1989),
- Georgiy Lavranchuk (January 23, 1989 – June 23, 1990),
- Fyodor Botnar (June 23, 1990 – August 29, 1991)
- Anatoly Plagara (August 29, 1991)
