= Piotr Chvertko =

Soviet politician and intelligence officer

- Пётр Чвертко

Chairman of the KGB of the Moldovian SSR
- In office 1967–1975
- Preceded by: Ivan Savchenko
- Succeeded by: Arkady Ragozin

Chairman of the KGB of the Kirghiz SSR
- In office 1961–1967
- Preceded by: Nikolai Yermolov
- Succeeded by: Dzhumabek Asankulov

Personal details
- Born: 3 October 1915
- Died: 16 November 2000 (aged 85)
- Party: CPSU

Military service
- Allegiance: Soviet Union
- Branch/service: KGB
- Rank: General major

Piotr Vladimirovich Chvertko (Russian: Пётр Владимирович Чвертко, born on 3 October 1915) was a Soviet politician who was the 4th Chairman of the KGB (Committee for State Security) of the Kirghiz SSR (1961–1967) and of the Moldavian Soviet Socialist Republic (1967–1975).

== Biography ==
Chvertko was moved to Moldova from the Kyrgyz Soviet Republic. He was a specialist in counterespionage. His job in Chişinău refers to the Ivan Bodiul epoch of the Rule by Communist Party of the Moldavian Soviet Republic and the change in the leadership of the Communist Party of the Soviet Union. The Soviet leaders had an evident accent on the stopping of the nationalistic and bourgeois ideology. Some of the achievements of the Nikita Khrushchev epoch of de-Stalinization were underwented. The number of tourists from Romania and other countries (Israel, Europe) has reduced in number, since the change of the coming to the leadership of Communist Party by Leonid Brezhnev. The main goals of activity of Chvertko in Moldova were:

- The control of Moldavian-Romanian contacts, and particularly:
  - The control under readers of Romanian literature, leasteners of the Romanian radio and TV
  - The control of private correspondence
  - The supervision of the visits of tourists from Romania
  - The intensification of the control under the persons which were made free from GULAG's
  - The control under political dissidents
- The fight with Zionism
- The control under opponents of the Soviet constitutional system (dissidents).

The most known cases of dissidents of that epoch are:

- Alexandru Şoltoianu (b. 1933, Ineshti village of Teleneshty region), the organizer of the first opposition Party in the Soviet Moldova and one of the first in the USSR, a graduate from the Moscow Institute for International relations.
- Gheorghe Ghimpu
- Valeriu Graur
- Alexandru Usatiuc-Bulgăr
- Gheorghe Muruziuc

A number of processes refer to members of Communist Party, which were investigated by KGB:

- Serghei Radautsan - the rector of the Chişinău Politechinc Institute.
- Nicolae Testemiţanu - the rector of the Chişinău State Medical Institute
- Boris Alexandru Găină - the secretary of the Teleneshty regional committee of Communist Party.

Chvertko's period on the head of Moldavian KGB finished in 1975, when he was moved to German Democratic Republic as an officer at one of the Soviet Army units, placed in Dresden, where he continued to occupy by counterespionage.

== General references ==
- Teodor Botnaru, Alexandru Ganenko. Istoria serviciilor secrete. Breviar. Chişinău, Museum Eds., 2004, p. 220
