= Aleksandr Sokiryansky =

Soviet Moldavian composer and musicologist (died 2019)

- Born: January 9, 1937
- Died: May 22, 2019 (aged 82)
- Era: 20th century

Aleksandr Sokiryansky (Romanian: Alexandru Sochireanschi, Russian: Александр Фёдорович Сокирянский) was a Soviet Moldavian composer and musicologist.

== Biography ==
He was born in on 9 January 1937 Cherkasy, in a Jewish family. During the war years, he lived with the mother in the evacuation in Taraz, where his younger sister died. His father died in the Siege of Leningrad. After the war, he returned with his mother to Cherkasy. After graduation, he entered the Poltava Music School in the violin class. After serving in the Soviet Army, he returned to Cherkasy, where he worked as a violinist in the orchestra of the Musical and Dramatic Theater. T. G. Shevchenko.

In 1964–1969 he studied at the Chișinău Art Institute named after G. Muzicescu in the composition class of M. R. Kopytman. Since 1969 he taught at the Chișinău Music School named after Ștefan Neaga. He became a member of the Union of Composers of Moldova in 1972. In addition to music, he also wrote poetry, in Romanian and Yiddish.

Since 1991 he has lived in Israel, in Kiryat Bialik. He died on 22 May 2019.
