= Freedom Party (Bessarabia) =

Freedom Party Partidul Libertăţii
- President: Victor Andreev
- Founded: 1949
- Dissolved: 1950

The Freedom Party (Romanian: Partidul Libertăţii) was a clandestine political party in the Moldovan SSR.

== Membership ==
The founders members were: Constantin Condrat (born 1914, Soroca), Ion Istrati (b. 1929), Nicolae Istrati (b. 1926), Victor Andreev (b. 1923, Mănoileşti), Vladimir Bivol (b. 1923, Cojuşna), Tudor Goncearencu (b. 1915, Gălăţeni), Andrei Sănduţă (b. 1921, Ialoveni). The idea of organizing to oppose the Stalinist genocidal policy as effectively as possible came to the members who would later form the core of the organization (it is the pedagogue Victor Andreev, first of all) in 1946, during a student meeting, after a speech by a young man named Nicolae, who, according to documents from the A.M.N.S.N.R.M. archives, would have said "'some truths known to everyone, but which until then no one had dared to say", such as the fact that the communist regime was ""a Pharisaic regime"" and that young people could not enjoy their youth, when ""parents and the brothers moaned for them in prisons" Nicolae Istrati, for example, one of the members, was not a novice in terms of anti-Soviet activity, he had been arrested before, in 1946, for "anti-Soviet agitation" and sentenced to 10 years in prison, but released by amnesty. However, the "Partidului Libertății" was established only in 1949.

The objectives of the organization were: "to restore freedom again and put the king on the throne", "to educate determined people, hardened in battle, who tomorrow will form the government of the Romanian state", "to liquidate all the rotten elements, which have found residence on Romanian territory", "to repatriate all those who today are chained in Siberia", "to return the property of those who were stripped by the invading hordes", "to restore the balance of the country from an economic, industrial, scientific point of view, etc. .", "to restore the borders of the country". Interestingly, the structure of the "Freedom Party" was similar to that of another anti-Soviet organization, as well as the fact that the Regulation refers to the existence of an organized resistance in Poland. It is also known that the organization had tried to contact similar organizations in Bessarabia and in Ukraine. It is possible that the members of the organization were aware of the existence of similar organizations in Romanian Bucovina, where the resistance had taken the proportions of the "partisan" armed struggle. On 6 July 1949, the Istrati brothers are deported to Siberia, without any connection to their activity within the "Freedom Party". While in Siberia, they manage to communicate with those back home and give advice to members of the organization.

== Bibliography ==
- Elena Postică, Rezistenţa antisovietică în Basarabia. 1945–1950, Chişinău, 1997 (lucrare elaborată în baza unor documente de arhivă inedite, în special din Arhiva Ministerului Securităţii Naţionale a Republicii Moldova, abreviat: A.M.S.N.R.M.),
- Elena Postică, "Partidul Libertăţii": reafirmarea ideii naţionale, Ţara, 1995, 1–5 decembrie,
- Istoria Partidului Comunist al Moldovei, Chişinău, 1968,
- Istoria RSS Moldoveneşti, vol.2, Chişinău, 1970,
- Totalitarianism Archives, volume IV-V, nr 13–14, winter 1996-spring 1997,
- Mihai Gribincea, Basarabia în primii ani de ocupaţie sovietică.1944–1950, Cluj-Napoca, 1995,
- Valeriu Pasat, Trudnie stranitsi istorii Moldovi. 1940–1950 [Culegere de documente] (Pages difficiles d'histoire de la Moldavie), Moscova, Ed. Terra, 1994,
- Istoria Basarabiei de la origini până la 1994, (coordonator Ioan Scurtu), București, 1994,
- Mitru Ghiţiu, Unele aspecte din mişcarea de rezistenţă antisovietică în Basarabia postbelică, în Analele Sighet 2, Instaurarea comunismului – între rezistenţă şi represiune, 1995,
- Mihai Gribincea, Agricultural Collectivization in Moldavia: Basarabia During Stalinism, 1944–1950, East European Monographs, 1996.
