= Simion Ghimpu =

Moldovan writer

- Born: May 24, 1939; Colonița, Kingdom of Romania (now Moldova)
- Died: July 27, 2010 (aged 71)
- Education: Russian Academy of Theatre Arts; Moldova State University
- Employer: Art Institute of Chişinău
- Spouse: Veta Ghimpu Munteanu
- Children: Tudor (b.Sept. 11, 1968), Lucian (b. March 16, 1988), Anda-Cristina (b. Nov.10, 1978)
- Parent(s): Irina and Toader Ghimpu
- Relatives: Gheorghe Ghimpu (brother); Mihai Ghimpu (brother); Grigore Grigoriu (godfather); Ruxanda Vahnovan (granddaughter); Ingrid Ghimp (granddaughter); Alexandru Vahnovan (grandson); Mihai Vahnovan (grandson); Sven Ghimp (grandson); Catinca Ghimpu (granddaughter); Mara Ghimpu (granddaughter)

Simion Ghimpu (24 May 1939 – 27 July 2010) was a Moldovan writer, poet, and essayist, known for his contributions to contemporary Moldovan literature. His works often reflected themes of national identity, culture, and human experience, positioning him as a significant voice in the intellectual life of Moldova during the late 20th century.

== Biography ==
Simion Ghimpu was born to Irina and Toader Ghimpu on 24 May 1939; he had four siblings: Gheorghe, Visarion, Valentina, and Mihai. Simion Ghimpu graduated from the Moldova State University in 1964 and got a PhD from the Russian Academy of Theatre Arts from Moscow in 1969. Simion Ghimpu worked for the Art Institute of Chişinău (1969–2000).

Simion Ghimpu is a member of the Moldovan Writers' Union and a lyricist. Simion Ghimpu created lyrics for over 100 songs, together with composers Eugen Doga, Ion Aldea Teodorovici, M. Dolgan, I. Enache, O. Milștein, Al. Sochireanschi, N. Carajia, A. Bivol, M. Oțel, C. Rusnac, A. Chiriac, E. Mamot, D. Radu, A. Luxemburg, D. Mateevici, S. Lăsoi, O. Ababii. Among them were the Moldovan hits: „Numai tu”, „Ce rost are?”, „Amor, amor”, „Lacrimă”, „Casa noastră”. Songs with his lyrics are performed by the bands Noroc and Orizont, by singers: Ion Suruceanu, Sofia Rotaru, Nadejda Cepraga, Anastasia Lazariuc, Nina Crulicovschi, Fratii Bivol, Olga Ciolacu, Alexandru Lozanciuc, Radu Dolgan, Ana Barbu, Aurel Margine and folk singers: Larisa Arsenie, Anatol Dincu, Nicolae Cibotaru.

Simion Ghimpu died on 24 July 2010. The body of late Simion Ghimpu was kept at the Moldovan Writers' Union on 28 July to allow people to pay their last respects. Politicians and writers like Ion Hadârcă, Mihai Cimpoi and Ion Ciocanu attended his funeral ceremony, which took place at the St. Teodora de la Sihla Church on 29 July 2010. Traian Băsescu and Mikheil Saakashvili expressed their condolences to Mihai Ghimpu; "In the last decade you've lost two brothers and Romanians lost two patriots dedicated to the Romanian culture and civilization" wrote Băsescu.

== Awards ==
- Simion Ghimpu with the volume "Life Within a Hair's Breadth of Death" won the Prize for Prose.

== Works ==
- „Jeep-ul şi Sania de la Coloniţa” (2008)
- „Mereu”, poems, ed. Hyperion (1995)
- „Reversul sentimentelor”, poems, editura Ruxanda (2000)
- „Dincolo”, poems, 2003; editura Pontos
- „Ghici, ce-s?” (2003)
- „Descifrări”, poems (2004)
- Stare de spirit (2007)
- „Viaţă pe muchie de cuţit”, roman autobiographic (2009)
- Ia să-mi spui tu, spui (2008)

== Gallery ==
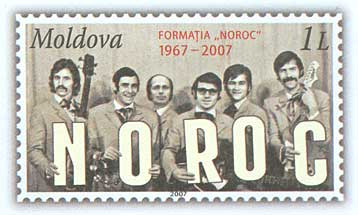
Simion Ghimpu was a lyricist for Noroc Band

== Bibliography ==
- Literatura şi arta Moldovei: Encicl. - Vol.1. - Chişinău, 1985.
- Mihai Cimpoi, O istorie deschisă a literaturii române din Basarabia. - Chişinău, 1996.
- Chişinău, Enciclopedie, 1997, Ed. Museum
