= Mihai Dolgan =

Moldovan singer and composer

Mihai Dolgan OR
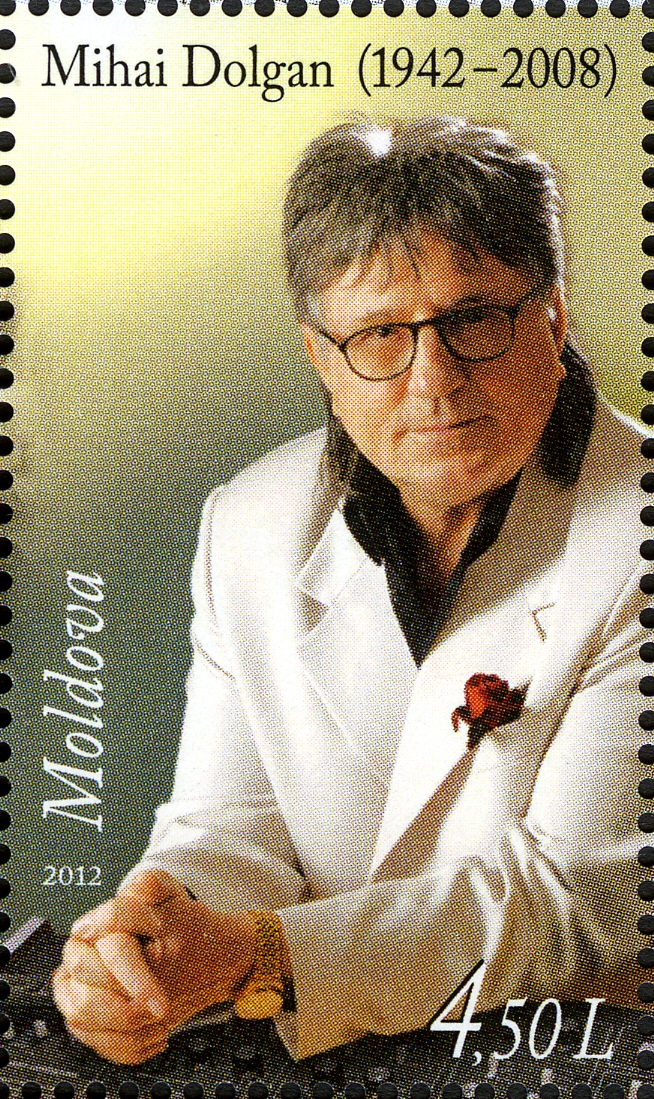
- 2012 stamp of Moldova
- Born: March 14, 1942; Vladimirești, Moldavian SSR, Soviet Union
- Died: March 16, 2008 (aged 66); Chişinău, Moldova
- Resting place: Armenian cemetery, Chişinău
- Occupations: Singer and composer
- Awards: Order of the Republic (Moldova)

Mihai Dolgan (14 March 1942 – 16 March 2008) was a singer and composer from Moldova. In 1967 he set up the Noroc which became one of the most famous bands in the Soviet Union.

== Biography ==
Mihail Dolgan was born on March 14, 1942, in Vladimirești of the Sângerei District. In 1949 all his family was deported to Siberia. He came back to Moldova in 1957. In 1967 Mihai Dolgan set up the Noroc ensemble, which became one of the most famous in the USSR. In 1970 the Ministry of Culture of the Moldavian Soviet Socialist Republic banned the ensemble and it returned onto the stage only in 1988. Mihai Dolgan is the author of about a hundred compositions, which became hits. On March 16, 2008, the composer Mihai Dolgan died in the hospital, suffering from an incurable disease. Mihai Dolgan was buried at the Armenian cemetery.

== Awards ==
- People's Artist, 1988
- Order of the Republic (Moldova), the highest state award, 2001

== Bibliography ==
- Iurie Colesnic. Chișinău. Enciclopedie.1997
- Serafim Buzilă. Interpreți din Moldova. Ch., Ed. Arc-Museum, 1996, reeditare 1999

== Discography ==
- ВИА «Норок» (1968)
- ВИА «Норок» (1969)
- Ансамбль «Норок» (1987)
