= Noroc =

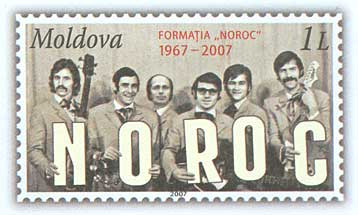
- Noroc on a 2007 stamp of Moldova

Background information
- Also known as: Contemporanul
- Origin: Chişinău

Noroc is a music group from Moldova, created in 1967 by Mihai Dolgan.

== History ==
"Noroc" became very popular in the USSR after the release of their first album in 1968 which included the following songs:

- "De ce plâng chitarele" (music: Mihai Dolgan; lyrics: Efim Crimerman)
- "Cântă un artist" (music: Mihai Dolgan; lyrics: Efim Crimerman)

In 1970, "Noroc" won the "public sympathy" prize at the "Bratislava Lyra" festival . Later the same year, after a tour of Ukraine, "Noroc" was banned as a result of a direct order by Ivan Bodiul, Chief Secretary of the Communist Party of the Moldavian Soviet Socialist Republic, due to "lack of discipline", "promotion of artistic values of poor quality", and "lack of healthy ideological orientation". Between the years 1974-1985 the band was reorganized by Mihai Dolgan under the name "Contemporanul". After 1985, "Contemporanul" reverted to the original name "Noroc". Since 1989 and up to Mihai Dolgan's death in 2008, "Noroc"'s permanent vocalists were: Lidia Botezatu, Radu Dolgan, Mihai Dolgan.

The word "noroc" means "good luck" in Romanian. This word is also used as a greeting. "Noroc" is also said while toasting (the Romanian equivalent of "cheers").
