= Eduard Lazarev =

Soviet composer and conductor (1935–2008)

- Born: 19 December 1935; Sverdlovsk (present-day Yekaterinburg), Russian SFSR, USSR
- Died: 10 December 2008 (aged 72); Moscow, Russia
- Citizenship: Soviet/Russian, Moldovan
- Education: Moscow Conservatory
- Era: 20th-century classical music
- Political party: Communist Party of the Soviet Union

Eduard Leonidovich Lazarev (Russian: Эдуа́рд Леони́дович Ла́зарев; 19 December 1935 – 10 January 2008) was a Moldovan composer of Russian descent.

Lazarev arranged the State Anthem of the Moldavian SSR in 1980, with authorization of The First Secretary of the Moldavian Communist Party Ivan Bodiul.

In April 1979, Lazarev received a premiere at the Bolshoi Theatre in Moscow when he combined music with excerpts from speeches of Vladimir Lenin in the opera "Chemarea Revoluţiei" (The Call of the Revolution; also known as Leniniana), which lasted only nine performances. Between 1974 and 1983 he wrote Master and Margarita, a ballet in 8 acts. His second Piano Trio (1992) has been recorded by the Moscow Piano Trio.

Eduard Lazarev died on 10 January 2008, at the age of 72.

== Works ==
- 1973 Acuzaţii de omor (Allegations of murder)
- 1973 Dimitrie Cantemir (Dimitrie Cantemir)
- 1976 Nimeni în locul tău (Nobody in your place)
- 1976 Pe urmele fire' (On the trail of the beast)
