= Anthem of the Moldavian Soviet Socialist Republic =

Moldova Sovietică
English: 'Soviet Moldavia'
- Молдова Советикэ
- Sheet music
- Former regional anthem of the Moldavian Soviet Socialist Republic
- Lyrics: Emilian Bukov and Bogdan Istru, 1945
- Music: Ștefan Neaga (1945); Eduard Lazarev (1980)
- Adopted: 1945; 1980
- Relinquished: 1980; 1991
- Preceded by: "Deșteaptă-te, române!"
- Succeeded by: "Deșteaptă-te, române!" (until 1994) "Limba noastra"

Audio sample
- Instrumental rendition in B-flat/E major: file; help

"Imnul de Stat al RSS Moldovenești" (original version)

The State Anthem of the Moldavian Soviet Socialist Republic was the anthem of Moldova when it was a constituent republic of the Soviet Union. Adopted in 1945, the music was composed by the composer Ștefan Neaga, and the original lyrics were written by the poets Emilian Bukov and Bogdan Istru.

In 1980, the music and the lyrics of the anthem were modified by First Secretary of the Communist Party of Moldavia Ivan Bodiul and composer Eduard Lazarev. As with other anthems of Soviet Socialist Republics after de-Stalinization, the lyrics removed references to Joseph Stalin. However, unlike the other anthems, the music for "Moldova Sovietică" was also altered, removing the original three-stanza structure in favour of a single-stanza three-part structure.

== History ==
In 1945, the Soviet Moldavian composer Ștefan Neaga composed the melody to "Moldova Sovietică", and the poets Emil Bukov and Bogdan Istru wrote the lyrics. Their works won national musical contest in their region, and they were selected to be the Moldavian anthem. Through this musical work, Neaga became well-respected among the Moldavian people.

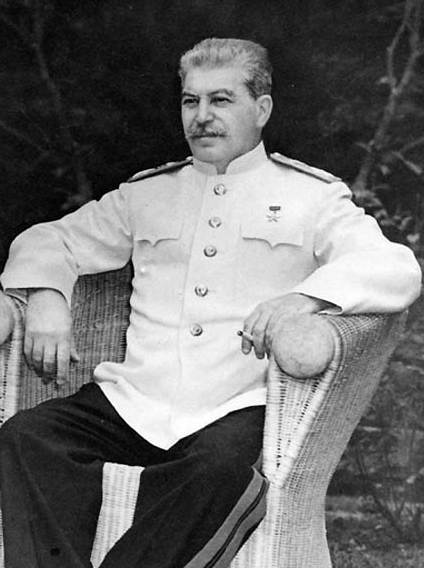
Stalin in 1945

Moldovan politician and historian Valeriu Passat [ro] stated in his exhibition, "13 ani de Stalinism. RSS Moldovenească în anii 1940–1953" (13 Years of Stalinism, Moldavian SSR in years 1940–1953) that Iosif Mordoveț [ro] forced the authors to write the anthem.

According to Vladimir Poțeluev, the anthem was created by an order made by the Supreme Soviet of the Soviet Union in Moscow, after the annexation of the Moldavian Autonomous Soviet Socialist Republic and the Bessarabian Soviet Socialist Republic. The Supreme Soviet also said that the top brass (e.g. Stalin et al.) set multiple rules for the writers of the lyrics:

- Mention to the Communist Party of the Soviet Union.
- Mention to the "liberation from the yoke of capitalism".
- Mention to the development of infrastructure under the Soviets.
- Mention to the unity of Moldavian people with the rest of the union (something typical in the anthems of the Soviet republics).
- Mention to the total expulsion of fascists on Moldavian Territory (Soviet victory over Adolf Hitler).

=== De-Stalinization ===
When Stalin died in 1953, the state anthems were muted by Nikita Khrushchev and his nation-wide de-Stalinization policy. For around two decades, the Moldavian SSR anthem did not officially contain lyrics, as it contained mentions of Stalin.

In 1977, the Soviet Union adopted a new constitution, which allowed the replacement of the lyrics of the national anthem and the anthems of the constituent republics, including Moldavia. Ivan Bodiul decided to shorten the anthem, so he, along with composer Eduard Lazarev, modified the original musical composition made by Neaga. The new composition maintained the music of the verses, added an introduction, an intermezzo, and in the end a variation of the original refrain. However, this new composition was not well received by others.

== Lyrics ==
Moldovan historian Valeriu Pasat stated that the authors of the anthem were ordered to write then by General Iosif Mordoveț, likely due to first secretary of the CPM Ivan Bodiul and the 1956 de-Stalinization.

=== Recordings of Stalinist version ===
There had been no proper full recordings of the original Stalin-era lyrics to the anthem; the only recordings intended for the original anthem contained discrepancies between the recording of the original lyrics recorded by the Brass Band of the USSR Ministry of Defense in 1968, and the recording of the post-Stalinist lyrics recorded by the Choir of the State Television and Radio Broadcasting Company of the Moldavian SSR. It had three verses—each with a refrain (which was the traditional scheme for writing Soviet regional anthems), though they had never been rendered properly.

In January 2016, it was discovered that the advertisement for the exhibition "13 Years of Stalinism", organized by historian and politician Valeriu Pasat, featured the beginning of the anthem, albeit with slightly modified lyrics. Later, the first sheet music page of the anthem – dating back to 1947 – was discovered in the catalog of the National Library of the Republic of Moldova.

The full proper recording of the original version of the anthem was subsequently uploaded to YouTube, after users that belonged to the so-called "Ștefan Neaga Commission" found recordings of the original lyrics.

=== Rejected verses ===
Variant by Emil Samoilă

Cotropitorii fasciști au cutezat
Să înrobească al nostru sfânt pământ.
Din piepturi zid de oțel am ridicat.
Dușmanului noi i-am săpat mormânt!
Republică-suroră, în vecii să fii slăvită!
În armonie noroadele trăiesc!
Puterea lor îi astăzi însutită
și din izbândă, izbândă făuresc!

Variant by Leonid Cornenanu

Noi veacuri întregi am zăcut în robir,
La Nistru și Prut ne doineam versul trist.
Dar Lenin și Stalin ne-au dat bucurie,
Ne-a dat-o iubitul partid comunist.

Variant by Liviu Deleanu
(rejected for aggression)

Crescută sub spada lui Ștefan cel Mare
și slova înțeleptului Domn Cantemir,
Moldova renaște din noi în hotare,
călită în lupte și mari izbândiri.

=== Orthography ===
The Cyrillic script was used officially for the Romanian language (called Moldovan) during Soviet times. However, after 1989, the Romanian language in modern-day Moldova now officially uses the Latin script; only the breakaway state of Transnistria (internationally recognized as a part of Moldova) still officially uses the Cyrillic alphabet.

=== Original version ===
Cyrillic script
(then official)

I
Молдова ку дойне стрэбуне пе плаюрь,
Ку поамэ ши пыне пе дялурь ши вэй.
Луптынд ку-ажуторул Русией мэреце,
А врут неатырнаря пэмынтулуй ей.

Рефрен:
Славэ ын вякурь, Молдовэ Советикэ,
Креште ку алте републичь сурорь,
Ши ку драпелул Советик ыналцэ-те,
Каля сэ-ць фие авынт креатор.

II
Пе друмул луминий ку Ленин ши Сталин,
Робия боерилор крунць ам ынвинс.
Пе ной дин избындэ-н избындэ ынаинте,
Не дуче слэвитул партид комунист.

Рефрен

III
Ын армия ноастрэ, луптынд витежеште,
Пе душманий цэрий ый вом бируи,
Ши-н маря фамилие а Униуний,
Молдова Советикэ-н вечь а-нфлори.

Рефрен

Latin script
(now official)

I
Moldova cu doine străbune pe plaiuri,
Cu poamă și pâne pe dealuri și văi.
Luptând cu-ajutorul Rusiei mărețe,
A vrut neatârnarea pământului ei.

Refren:
Slavă în veacuri, Moldovă Sovietică,
Crește cu alte republici surori,
Și cu drapelul Sovietic înalță-te,
Calea să-ți fie avânt creator.

II
Pe drumul luminii cu Lenin și Stalin,
Robia boierilor crunți am învins.
Pe noi din izbândă-n izbândă înainte,
Ne duce slăvitul partid comunist.

Refren

III
În armia noastră, luptând vitejește,
Pe dușmanii țării îi vom birui,
Și-n marea familie a Uniunii,
Moldova Sovietică-n veci a-nflori.

Refren

IPA transcription
(Moldavian dialect)

1
[molˈdo.va ku ˈdoj.ne strəˈbu.ne ce ˈpla.jurʲ
ku ˈpo̯a.mə ʃi ˈpɨ.ne pe ˈde̯a.lurʲ ʃi ˈvəj
lup.ˈtɨnd kwa.ʒuˈto.rul ruˈsi.jej məˈre.tse
a ˈvrut ne̯a.tɨrˈna.re̯a pəˈmɨn.tu.luj ˈjej]

[re.fren]
[ˈsla.və ɨɱ ˈve̯a.kurʲ mol.ˈdo.və soˈvje.ti.kə
ˈkreʃ.te ku ˈal.te reˈpu.blit͡ʃʲ suˈrorʲ
ˈʃi ku draˈpe.lul soˈvje.tik ɨˈnal.tsə.te
ˈka.le̯a sət͡sʲ ˈfi.je a.ˈvɨnt kre.aˈtor]

2
[pe ˈdru.mul luˈmi.nij ku ˈle.nin ʃi ˈsta.lin
roˈbi.ja boˈje.ri.lor ˈkrunt͡sʲ am ɨn.ˈvins
pe ˈnoj din izˈbɨn.dən̩ izˈbɨn.də͜ ɨ.naˈin.te
ne ˈdu.t͡ʃe sləˈvi.tul parˈtid ko.muˈnist]

[re.fren]

3
[ɨn ˈar.mi.je ˈno̯as.trə lupˈtɨnd vi.teˈʒəʃ.te
pe ˈduʃ.ma.nij ˈt͡sə.rij ɨj ˈvom bi.ruˈi
ʃiɲ̩ ˈma.re̯a faˈmi.li.je a u.ni.ˈu.nij
molˈdo.va soˈvje.ti.kəɲ̩ ˈvet͡ʃʲ aɱ.floˈri]

[re.fren]

English translation

I
Moldavia, land of ancestral doinas abound,
Its hills and valleys, where grapes and bread are found.
With the aid of Great Russia, we fight in battle,
To make thy land free, we conquer thy struggle.

Refrain:
O Soviet Moldavia, eternally flourish,
With the others, we are able to grow,
And around the Soviet flag, up it riseth,
Let the path be thy great gifted flow.

II
Lenin and Stalin, with us, in thy path agleam,
We have defeated the cruel boyar's bondage.
For us from victory to victory alee,
The glorious Communist Party leadeth us!

Refrain

III
Among our Army, fighting valiantly,
We'll beat the enemies of thy country,
And in the great family of the Union,
Soviet Moldavia shall flourish evermore.

Refrain

Russian translation

I
Молдова с древними дойнами на своих землях,
С виноградом и хлебом на холмах и долинах.
Борясь с помощью великой России,
Она хотела независимости своей земли.

Припев:
Славься в веках, Советская Молдова,
Развивающаяся с другими братскими республиками,
И с Советами твой флаг поднимается,
Для развития и созидания.

II
Идя по светлому пути с Лениным и Сталиным,
Мы победили рабство жестоких дворян.
От победы к победе
Нас ведёт славная Коммунистическая партия.

Припев

III
С нашей армией, борющейся доблестно,
Мы преодолеем врагов страны,
И в большой семье Союза,
Советская Молдавия всегда будет процветать.

Припев

=== Post-Stalinist version ===
After Stalin's death in 1953, like other SSR anthems, any mentions of the former leader have been removed; however, a new version of the anthem was not adopted until 1980. The anthem was rewritten from the typical three verses with choruses—like other SSR anthems—to a three-part single verse without choruses, which was used until the collapse of the Soviet Union in 1991.

The music was composed by Ștefan Neaga and was arranged by Eduard Lazarev, and the lyrics were written by Emilian Bucov and Bogdan Istru.

Moldovan Cyrillic script
(then official)

I
Молдова Советикэ, плаюл ностру’н флоаре,
Алэтурь де алте републичь сурорь.
Пэшеште ымпреунэ ку Русия маре,
Спре ал Униуний сенин виитор.

II
Дойна ынфрэцирий прослэвеште Цара,
Ку ынцелепчуне кондусэ де Партид.
Кауза луй Ленин – каузэ мэряцэ –
О ынфэптуеште попорул стрынс унит.

III
Славэ ын вякурь, ренэскут пэмынт!
Мунка сэ-ць фие креатор авынт!
Ши комунисмул – цел нестрэмутат –
Ыналцэ-л прин фапте пентру феричиря та!

Romanian Latin script
(now official)

I
Moldova Sovietică, plaiul nostru-n floare,
Alături de alte republici surori.
Pășește împreună cu Rusia mare,
Spre al Uniunii senin viitor.

II
Doina înfrățirii proslăvește Țara,
Cu înțelepciune condusă de Partid.
Cauza lui Lenin – cauză măreață –
O înfăptuiește poporul strâns unit.

III
Slavă în veacuri, renăscut pământ!
Munca să-ți fie creator avânt!
Și comunismul – țel nestrămutat –
Înalță-l prin fapte pentru fericirea ta!

IPA transcription
(Moldavian dialect)

1
[molˈdo.va soˈvje.ti.kə ˈpla.jul ˈnos.truɱ̩ ˈflo̯a.re
aˈlə.turʲ de ˈal.te reˈpu.blit͡ʃʲ suˈrorʲ
pəˈʃəʃ.te ɨm.preˈu.nə ku ruˈsi.je ˈma.re
spre al u.niˈu.nij seˈnin vi.jiˈtor]

2
[ˈdoj.na ɨɱ.frəˈt͡si.rij pro.sləˈveʃ.te ˈt͡sa.ra
ku ɨn.t͡se.lepˈt͡ʃu.ne konˈdu.sə de parˈtid
ˈkaw.za luj ˈle.nin ˈkaw.zə məˈre̯a.tsə
o ɨɱ.fəp.tuˈjeʃ.te poˈpo.rul strɨns uˈnit]

3
[ˈsla.və ɨɱ ˈve̯a.kurʲ re.nəsˈkut pəˈmɨnt
ˈmuŋ.ka sət͡sʲ ˈfi.je kre.aˈtor aˈvɨnt
ʃi ko.muˈniz.mul ˈt͡sel nes.trə.muˈtat
ɨˈnal.tsəl̩ priɲ ˈfap.te pen.tru fe.rɨ.ˈt͡ʃi.re̯a ˈta]

Russian translation

I
Молдова Советская, край наш цветущий,
В единой семье республик-сестер
С Великой Россией вместе шагает
К светлому грядущему Союза.

II
Дойна единенья славит нашу Отчизну,
Ведомую мудро Партией могучей.
Дело Ленина, великое дело,
В жизнь воплощает сплоченный народ.

III
Славься в веках, земля возрожденная!
Труд твой да будет творческим порывом!
И коммунизм, цель непоколебимую,
Воздвигай делами для счастья своего!

English translation

I
Soviet Moldavia, our land of flowers,
Along with our sister republics,
Together with Great Mother Russia we march on,
Toward the serene future of the Union.

II
The fraternal country praises the doinas,
As our great Party sagaciously leads us.
The cause of Lenin, a cause so noble,
Brought about by our undivided people.

III
Of aeons glorious, O land renewed!
For you may labour be a sire great!
And communism, this goal unshaken –
You raise it through the achievements for your blessing!

== See also ==
- Anthem of Transnistria
- "Deșteaptă-te, române!"
- "Limba noastră"
- "Tarafım"
- State Anthem of the Soviet Union
