= Mihai Ghimpu =

President of the Moldovan Parliament from 2009 to 2010

Mihai Ghimpu OR
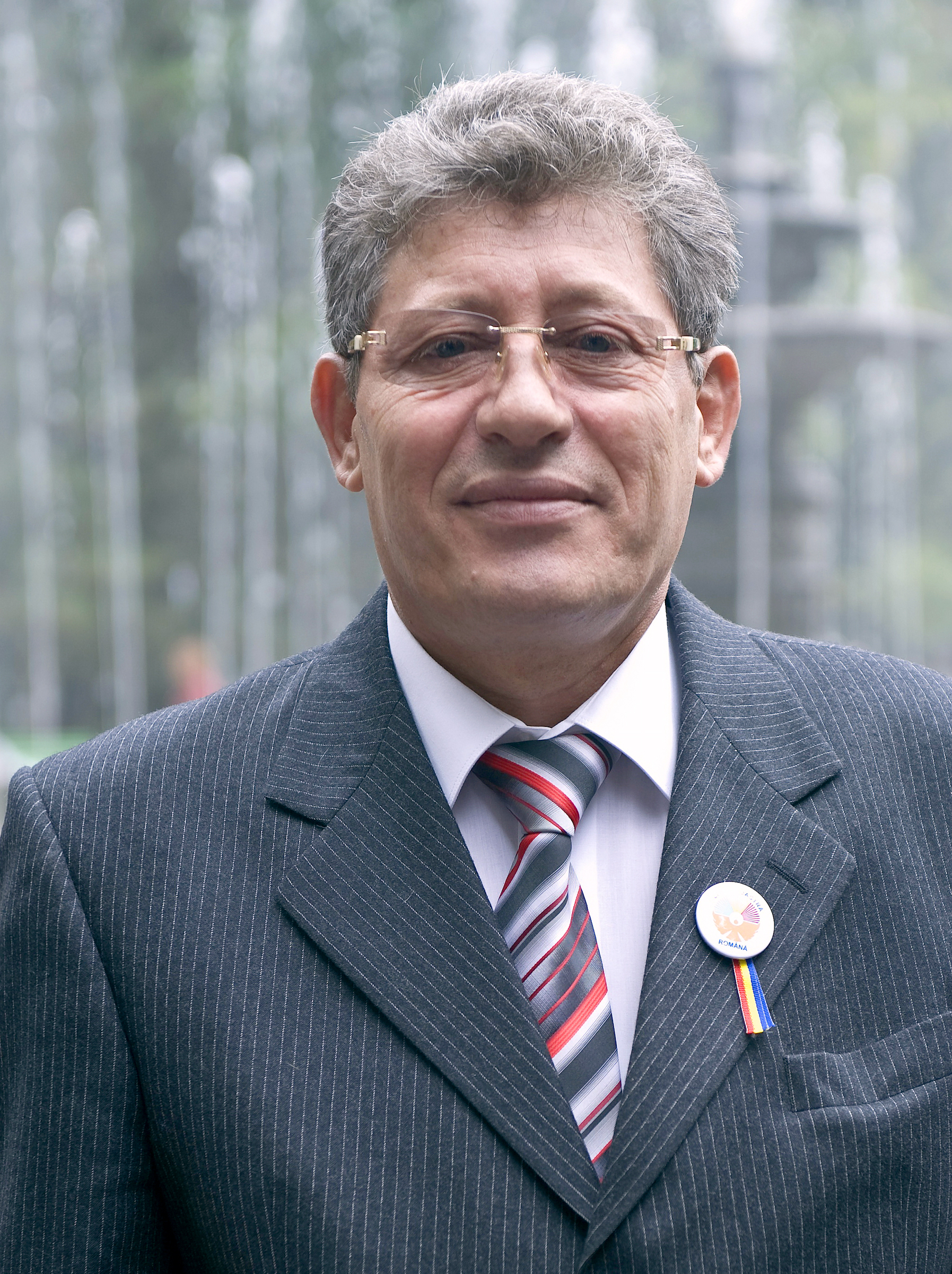
- Ghimpu in 2009

President of the Liberal Party
- Incumbent
- Assumed office 27 July 2025
- Preceded by: Dorin Chirtoacă
- In office 5 January 1998 – 1 December 2018
- Preceded by: Anatol Șalaru (as Leader of the Reform Party)
- Succeeded by: Dorin Chirtoacă

Acting President of Moldova
- In office 11 September 2009 – 28 December 2010
- Prime Minister: Zinaida Greceanîi; Vitalie Pîrlog (acting); Vlad Filat
- Preceded by: Vladimir Voronin
- Succeeded by: Vlad Filat

8th President of the Moldovan Parliament
- In office 28 August 2009 – 28 December 2010
- President: Vladimir Voronin; Himself (acting)
- Prime Minister: Zinaida Greceanîi; Vitalie Pîrlog (acting); Vlad Filat
- Deputy: See list: Serafim Urechean Iurie Țap Marcel Răducan Alexandr Stoianoglo
- Preceded by: Vladimir Voronin
- Succeeded by: Marian Lupu

Member of the Moldovan Parliament
- In office 22 April 2009 – 9 March 2019
- Parliamentary group: Liberal Party
- In office 10 March 1990 – 9 April 1998
- Parliamentary group: Popular Front
- Constituency: Chișinău

Member of the Chișinău Municipal Council
- In office 22 June 2007 – 5 April 2009

President of the Chișinău Municipal Council
- In office 11 November 2007 – 6 June 2008
- Succeeded by: Eduard Mușuc

Personal details
- Born: 19 November 1951 (age 74) Colonița, Moldavian SSR, Soviet Union
- Citizenship: Moldova; Romania
- Party: Popular Front (1990–1993); Liberal Party (1993–present)
- Other political affiliations: Bloc of the Intellectuals (1994); Alliance for European Integration (2009–present)
- Spouse: Dina Ghimpu
- Relatives: Gheorghe Ghimpu (brother); Dorin Chirtoacă (nephew); Simion Ghimpu (brother)
- Education: Moldova State University
- Awards: Order of the Star of Romania, 1st Class

Mihai Ghimpu (born 19 November 1951) is a Moldovan politician who served as President of the Moldovan Parliament and Acting President of Moldova from 2009 to 2010. He was member of Parliament of Moldova from 1990 to 1998 and from 2009 to 2019. Ghimpu held the position of leader of Liberal Party (PL) from 1998 to 2018.

== Family ==
Mihai Ghimpu was born on 19 November 1951 in the village of Colonița, Chișinău, Moldavian SSR. His mother, Irina Ursu (daughter of Haralambie Ursu) died in 2003; she worked at the local kolkhoz. His father, Toader Ghimpu (deceased in 1980), was an elementary school teacher only a few years because he completed only seven years of schooling during the Romanian rule, then he worked at the local kolkhoz too. Mihai Ghimpu is the youngest brother of Gheorghe Ghimpu, Simion Ghimpu, Visarion, and Valentina (mother of Dorin Chirtoacă). He has been married, for more than 30 years, to Dina Ghimpu, an employee of Moldova's Culture Ministry; they have no children.

== Education and early career ==
After attending elementary school in his hometown, Mihai Ghimpu enrolled in School no.1 of Chișinău (now "Gheorghe Asachi" High School). After high school, he carried out the compulsory military service in the Soviet army until 1972. Then, Ghimpu studied law at Moldova State University (1974–1978), after which worked as legal counsel to state enterprises. In 1978–1990 years he worked as a lawyer, headed the legal departments of various companies and served as a judge in Sectorul Rîșcani of Chișinău.

In the late 1980s Ghimpu joined the democratic movement. He was one of the founders of the Popular Front of Moldova, a member of the executive committee of the movement, known as one of the leading political forces in Moldova. In 1990 polls, Mihai Ghimpu was elected to Moldovan Parliament as a representative of Popular Front and in 1994 polls as a representative of the Bloc of the Intellectuals. Alongside parliament members, Ghimpu voted the Declaration of Independence of Moldova in 1991.

In 1997 Mihai Ghimpu was elected as chairman of the Party of Reform, created by Anatol Șalaru in 1993. In 1998 polls, the party obtained only 0.54% and failed to pass the electoral threshold of 4%. The Party of Reform didn't participate in 2001 polls and 2005 polls.

In April 2005, the party changed its name and became known as the Liberal Party of Moldova (PL). In 2007, Mihai Ghimpu was elected as alderman in Chișinău Municipal Council. Two weeks later, the vice-president of the Liberal Party, Dorin Chirtoacă won a victory over the Communist Veaceslav Iordan and became mayor of Chișinău. The Liberal Party obtained 13.13% of the votes in April 2009 polls, equating to 15 out of 101 MPs; Ghimpu was one of the party's MPs and in the July 2009 polls, he was re-elected.

According to last polls made in 2019 referring to the most popular politicians of the Republic of Moldova, Mihai Ghimpu is on the fifteenth position among the top of politicians in which Moldovans have the highest trust, and the others are on the eleventh position

== Timeline ==
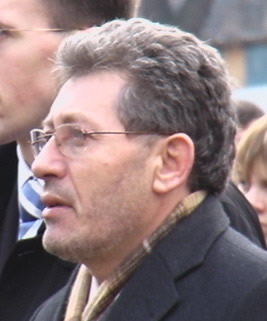
Mihai Ghimpu

- 1988–1993: Founder of the democratic movement the Popular Front of Moldova, member of the Executive Office
- 1990–1998: Member of Parliament of the Republic of Moldova, Vice Chairman of Legal Committee
- 1993–1998: The Congress of Intellectuals, Executive Secretary, Vice President
- 1998–present: Chairman of the Liberal Party (PL)
- 2007–2009: alderman in Chișinau Municipal Council
- 2007–2008: Chairman of the Chișinau Municipal Council
- 28 August 2009: Elected as Speaker of the Moldovan Parliament
- 11 September 2009 – 28 December 2010: interim President of the Republic of Moldova.

== Alliance For European Integration ==
In July 2009 were held early parliamentary elections for the XVIII convocation. The Moldovan Communist Party (PCRM) won the elections with 44.76 per cent of votes. In the parliament entered four other parties – the Liberal Democratic Party of Moldova (16.55 percent), Liberal Party (14.61 percent), Democratic Party of Moldova (12.55 percent) and the Party Alliance Our Moldova (7.35 percent of the vote). As a result, the Communists gained 48 seats in Parliament (out of 101), the Liberal Democrats – 18, Liberals – 15, ASM – 7, the Democrats – 13.

The leader of Liberal Party (PL), Mihai Ghimpu, as well as leaders of the Liberal Democratic Party of Moldova (PLDM), Vlad Filat, Democratic Party of Moldova (PDM), Marian Lupu and the Party Alliance Our Moldova (AMN) Serafim Urechean more than a week held talks on forming a coalition, and in August 2009 the party established a governing coalition under the banner "Alliance For European Integration".

== President of the Moldovan Parliament ==
On 28 August 2009, Mihai Ghimpu was elected as the Speaker of the Moldovan Parliament, through secret voting, getting all 53 votes of the Alliance For European Integration.

Mihai Ghimpu on 28 August 2009: "I thank my colleagues for their trust. I hope that while in this post I will cooperate for a free press, independent legal system, and a state of law of which all the Moldovan citizens will be proud."

Speaking at the World Conference of Speakers of Parliament in Geneva on 20 July 2010, Ghimpu said: "Why have we become the poorest country in Europe? Not only because we did not carry out democratic reforms at the right time, but also because today on the territory of Moldova, part of an occupation army and its equipment continue to be stationed."

== President of Moldova ==
On 11 September 2009, he became the acting president of Moldova. The interim position was possible following the resignation of Moldovan President, Vladimir Voronin, announced in the morning of 11 September 2009 on the public broadcaster Moldova 1. The resignation letter was sent to the Parliament secretariat and by a vote of 52 deputies in the plenary session of the legislature the post of the President of the Republic of Moldova was declared vacant. Therefore, in accordance with Article 91 of the Constitution of 1994, which provides that "the responsibility of the office shall devolve ad interim to the President of Parliament or the Prime Minister, in that order of priority", Mihai Ghimpu has become the interim President of the Republic of Moldova until a new president is elected by the Parliament.

The Commission for constitutional reform in Moldova was set up under presidential decree on 1 December 2009 in order to resolve the constitutional crisis. On 14 January 2010 Ghimpu decreed to set up a Commission for the Study of the Communist Dictatorship in Moldova, aimed at studying the responsibilities of Soviet rule in the former Moldavian SSR.

In June 2010, Ghimpu decreed a Soviet Occupation Day. The decree that was promptly cancelled by the Constitutional Court on 12 July 2010. He also unveiled the commemorative stone to the victims of totalitarianism.

Ghimpu has been awarded the Order of the Star of Romania, 1st Class (Collar).

== Ethnic identity ==
Mihai Ghimpu is known as an unambiguous supporter of the common Romanian-Moldovan ethnic identity:

What have we gained having as leaders people who knew that the language is Romanian and that we are Romanians, but acknowledged this truth only after they left office? I have not come to manipulate the citizens, but to tell them the truth.

== See also ==
- Liberal Party (Moldova)
- Liberalism
- Parliament of the Republic of Moldova
- President of Moldova
- Acting President of Moldova

== Notes ==
Party political offices
New office	President of the Liberal Party; 2005-present	Incumbent
Political offices
Preceded by Vladimir Voronin	President of Moldova; Acting; 2009–2010	Succeeded by Vlad Filat; Acting
