= Ivan Savchenko =

KGB officer

- Иван Савченко

Chairman of the KGB of the Moldovian SSR
- In office 13 March 1954 – 6 July 1959
- Preceded by: Andrei Prokopenko
- Succeeded by: Piotr Chvertko

Deputy Chairman of the KGB
- In office 13 March 1954 – 6 July 1959

Personal details
- Born: 9 March 1908
- Died: 5 September 1999 (aged 91)
- Party: CPSU
- Awards: Order of Lenin; Order of the October Revolution; Order of the Red Banner of Labour; Order of Georgi Dimitrov

Military service
- Allegiance: Soviet Union
- Branch/service: KGB
- Rank: Lieutenant general

Ivan Tikhonovich Savchenko (Russian: Иван Тихонович Савченко; 9 March 1908 – 5 September 1999) was a Soviet Communist Party and KGB executive. Savchenko made a career as a political officer in the Red Army during World War II. A protégé of Nikita Khrushchev and Leonid Brezhnev, Savchenko transferred to the Ministry of State Security (the predecessor to the KGB) in 1951. In 1952 he was promoted to the chief of the Special Services Department (GUSS, a cryptanalysis and information security branch of the Central Committee), in 1953 to the Chief of the KGB's Eighth Chief Directorate. His record at the national Party and KGB levels was lackluster, and 1959 he was transferred from Moscow to Chişinău as the head of the Moldavian SSR KGB. In 1967–1979 Savchenko represented the KGB in Romania and Bulgaria.

== Service in Moscow ==
In June 1951 Savchenko, who already earned special operations experience in the fight against Ukrainian nationalists, held an insignificant bureaucratic appointment in the national offices of the Central Committee in Moscow. In July 1951, after the fall of State Security chief Viktor Abakumov, colonel Savchenko was hastily recruited to the Ministry of State Security (MGB). Savchenko temporarily held the post of the Deputy Chairman of the MGB, but apparently had not done anything notable in this office. One year later he was transferred back to the Central Committee, and appointed chief of its Special Services Department (GUSS), a SIGINT and cryptanalysis service.

GUSS was created in 1942 by (then) major Ivan Shevelev. In 1949 the service was transferred from the NKVD control under direct management of the Central Committee. Shevelev, otherwise a capable SIGINT officer, was not able to overcome the shortage of qualified staff and the departmental rivalry with the stronger GRU force. In June 1952 Shevelev, now a Lieutenant General, was replaced by Savchenko. After the death of Joseph Stalin GUSS was reincorporated into the KGB as its Eighth Directorate, with Savchenko in command. Savchenko, a career apparatchik without technical or intelligence background, "proved to be a major disappointment given his lack of understanding of the technical aspects ... and his well-advertised ambition to get promoted out of GUSS."

== Service in Moldova ==
In 1959 Savchenko was transferred to Moldova and appointed chief of the State Committee of Security of Moldavian SSR. He assumed control over Moldovan KGB at the time when its rights were limited and duties extended. The border guard troops, reporting to KGB general Iosif Mordovets, once subordinated to the Moldovan KGB, now reported directly to Moscow. Savchenko, a Party apparatchik tasked with increasing the Party influence in the KGB, established himself as a capable executive with good interpersonal communication skills. He refused to recruit anyone with less than a university degree, and willfully recruited Moldovan nationals.

His rule in Moldova was marked by the food crisis of the 1960s and its consequence, the rise in black market trading which the KGB was never able to control. In line with Khrushchev's anti-religious campaign, Moldovan KGB actively repressed the church. Many churches and monasteries were closed, the remaining ones infiltrated by the KGB agents and directly regulated from the KGB offices. As the number of foreign tourists increased, Savchenko had to focus on this threat too. The Council of Ministers, concerned about foreign infiltration, installed tight controls over the contacts between foreigners and locals, particularly scientists and academic. Savchenko's influence was gradually diluted since 1962, with the rise of Yuri Andropov, an enemy of Khrushchev. In the late 1960s Major General Savchenko was relieved from his Moldovan appointment and transferred to less important foreign service in the Soviet bloc. He died in Moscow at the age of 91.
