= Nicolae Lupan =

Moldovan journalist

- Born: 16 March 1921; Cepeleuți, Kingdom of Romania (today Moldova)
- Died: 25 January 2017 (aged 95); Paris, France
- Education: Moldova State University
- Occupation: Journalist
- Employer(s): Radio Free Europe; TeleRadio-Moldova
- Political party: National Patriotic Front
- Spouse: Ana
- Children: 3

Nicolae Lupan (16 March 1921 – 25 January 2017) was a Bessarabian journalist.

== Biography ==
In 1958, Lupan became the first editor-in-chief of TeleRadio-Moldova. He was a member of the National Patriotic Front and lost his job. In March 1974, Lupan went into exile in Belgium, where he worked for the Radio Free Europe (1974–1987).

Lupan was the president of the Pro-Bessarabia and Bukovina Association (Romanian: Asociaţia Pro-Basarabia şi Bucovina). The association was formed in Paris on 27 November 1950 by Nicolae Dianu and reactivated by Lupan in 1975.

== Works ==
- Nicolae Lupan, Plânsul Basarabiei, 1981, Carpatii, Madrid
- Nicolae Lupan, "Bessarabie, terre roumaine", 1982
- Nicolae Lupan, Pământuri româneşti : Schiţe, studii şi versuri, Brussels 1984.
- Nicolae Lupan, "Basarabia si Bucovina sunt Pãmânturi Românesti", Ed. Nistru, Brussels 1984.
- Nicolae Lupan, Scrisoare fratelui meu, Editura Nistru, Brussels, 1984, 156 pp.
- Nicolae Lupan, "Imagini nistrene", 2 volumes, 1986, 1990
- Nicolae Lupan, "Alexandru Cristescu, erou si martir", 1987
- Nicolae Lupan, Pământul Basarabiei. Brussels, 1989.
- Nicolae Lupan, Însemnări de desţărat. Brussels, 2001
- Nicolae Lupan, Din coapsa Daciei si a Romei
- Nicolae Lupan, Strain la mine acasa", 1996
- Nicolae Lupan, Gânduri de proscris

== Bibliography ==
- Janusz Bugajski, Ethnic Politics in Eastern Europe: A Guide to Nationality Policies, Organizations, and Parties, 1995.
