= Memorial to the People Killed by Bolsheviks =

Memorial to the people killed by Bolsheviks
- Location: Răzeni
- Designer: Tudor Cataraga
- Completion date: 2009
- Opening date: February 21, 2009
- Dedicated to: Victims of the Răzeni Massacre

The Stone cross in the memory of the people killed by Bolsheviks (Romanian: Crucea de piatră de la Rezeni în memoria celor omorâți de bolșevici) is a monument in Răzeni, Moldova.

== Overview ==
The memorial is dedicated to the victims of the Răzeni Massacre. The massacre took place on June 22, 1941, in Răzeni, when 10 people were killed by the Soviet authorities and buried in a mass grave. The memorial was opened on February 21, 2009; Moldovan politician Alexandru Tănase was present.

In 1941 after Operation Barbarossa, when the area came under the control of the pro-Nazi Antonescu regime, a commemorative plaque was installed in Răzeni: "Aici odihnesc robii lui Dumnezeu Diomid, Niculai, Dănila, Nichita, Alexandru, Jurian, Alexandru, Ilie, doi necunoscuți. Omorâți mișelește de bolșevici comuniști. 12.VII.1941".

== See also ==
- Mass killings under Communist regimes
