= Colonița =

- Village
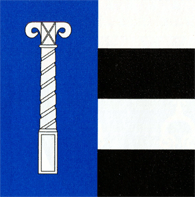
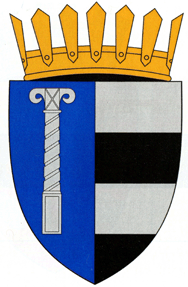
- Flag Coat of arms

- Location in Moldova
- Coordinates: 47°02′N 28°57′E
- Country: Moldova
- Municipality: Chișinău Municipality

Government
  - Mayor: Angela Zaporojan (MAN)

Population (2024 census)
  - Total: 3,956
- Time zone: UTC+2 (EET)
  - Summer (DST): UTC+3 (EEST)
- Postal code: MD-2082

Colonița is a village in Chișinău municipality, Moldova.

== Notable people ==
- Dorin Chirtoacă
- Gheorghe Ghimpu
- Mihai Ghimpu
- Simion Ghimpu
