= Ștefan Neaga =

Moldavian conductor (1900–1951)

- Born: 7 December 1900; Chișinău, Russian Empire (now Republic of Moldova)
- Died: 30 May 1951 (aged 50); Chișinău, Moldavian SSR, USSR
- Education: National University of Music Bucharest, École normale de musique de Paris
- Era: Folk-inspired early modern
- Works: Anthem of the Moldavian Soviet Socialist Republic

Member of the Supreme Soviet of the Moldavian SSR
- In office 1946–1951

Personal details
- Party: All-Union Communist Party (Bolsheviks)
- Other political affiliations: Communist Party of Moldavia
- Awards: Stalin Prize (1950); Order of Lenin; Honored Worker of the Moldavian SSR

Ștefan Neaga (7 December [O.S. 24 November] 1900 – 30 May 1951) was a Moldovan and Soviet composer. He was the son of the Moldovan "Lăutar" folk musician Timofei Neaga.

== Biography ==
From an early age he was a pianist in his father's orchestra. At the age of 18, he graduated with high distinction the School of Music in Chișinău in the class of piano of the prominent teacher and pianist from Odesa Iuliu Guz. By that time he met the Romanian virtuoso Grigoraș Dinicu who invited him in his ensemble as a concert pianist, accompagnateur and arranger. In 1920 he entered the class of piano at the National University of Music Bucharest. He did not finish his course in composition due to his concert tours as a virtuoso pianist whose repertoire included works of Bach, Beethoven, Tchaikovsky, Chopin, Liszt, Debussy, Ravel, R. Strauss, etc.

In 1926 he entered again the Academy of Music, Theater and Fine arts in the class of composition of Dimitrie Cuclin. There he was absorbed by the enthusiasm of composing, and, after graduating the Academy (in 1931), he decided to go to Paris where he met again Grigoraș Dinicu. There he was advised to enter École Normale de Musique de Paris in the class of composition of Nadia Boulanger, piano - with Alfred Cortot, and conducting - with Charles Munch.

== Awards ==
- Stalin Prize (1950)
- Order of Lenin
- Honored Worker of the Moldavian SSR

== Legacy ==
The Chișinău College of Music (which has a monument in his honor) is named for him. In 1952, a street was named after him in the Sectorul Buiucani of the capital. His son Gheorghe was also a composer.

The following is a list of his more famous works:

- Anthem of the Moldavian Soviet Socialist Republic (1945)
- Stefan cel Mare (1945)
- Bessarabians (1947)
- Jubilee Cantata (1949)
- The Song of Revival (1951)

In regards to the melody for the MSSR anthem, Neaga said that he wanted to represent with his work "the creativity and love of Great Stalin, the certainty of the victory of communism, and his desire to give all his forces in this unique case" and that he wanted to "create the symbol of these historic victories, in which the Moldovan people regained their freedom."
