= Răzeni =

- Commune
- Location in Moldova
- Coordinates: 46°46′N 28°54′E
- Country: Moldova
- District: Ialoveni District

Population (2014)
  - Total: 7,031
- Time zone: UTC+2 (EET)
  - Summer (DST): UTC+3 (EEST)

Răzeni is a commune in Ialoveni District, Moldova. It is composed of two villages, Mileștii Noi and Răzeni.

== History ==
The Răzeni Massacre took place on June 22, 1941, when ten people were killed by the Soviet authorities and buried in a mass grave.

== Notable people ==
- Ion Inculeț
- Ion Pelivan
- Elena Alistar

== See also ==
- Memorial to the victims of Răzeni Massacre
