= Mănoilești =

- Commune
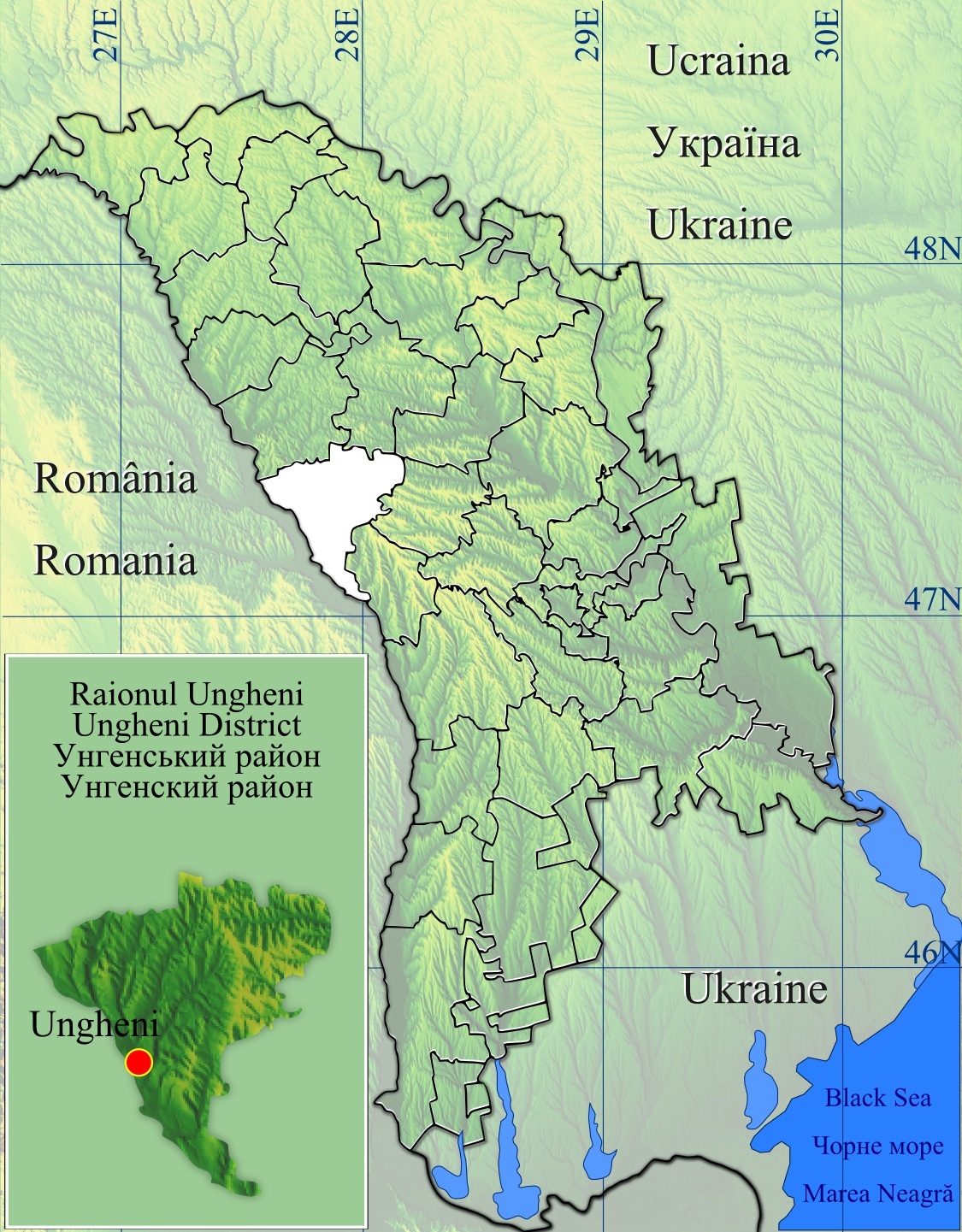
- Location within Ungheni
- Coordinates: 47°14′13″N 27°52′46″E
- Country: Moldova
- District: Ungheni District

Government
  - Mayor: Popa Alexei, 2007

Population (2014)
  - Total: 1,411
- Time zone: UTC+2 (EET)
  - Summer (DST): UTC+3 (EEST)
- Postal code: MD-3634

Agronomovca is a commune in Ungheni District, Moldova. It is composed of four villages: Mănoilești, Novaia Nicolaevca, Rezina and Vulpești.
