= Inești =

- Village
- Location within Moldova
- Coordinates: 47.5044444444°N 28.3977777778°E
- Country: Moldova
- District: Telenești District

Government
  - Mayor: Bunescu Ghenadie

Population (2014 census)
  - Total: 2,081
- Time zone: UTC+2 (EET)
  - Summer (DST): UTC+3 (EEST)

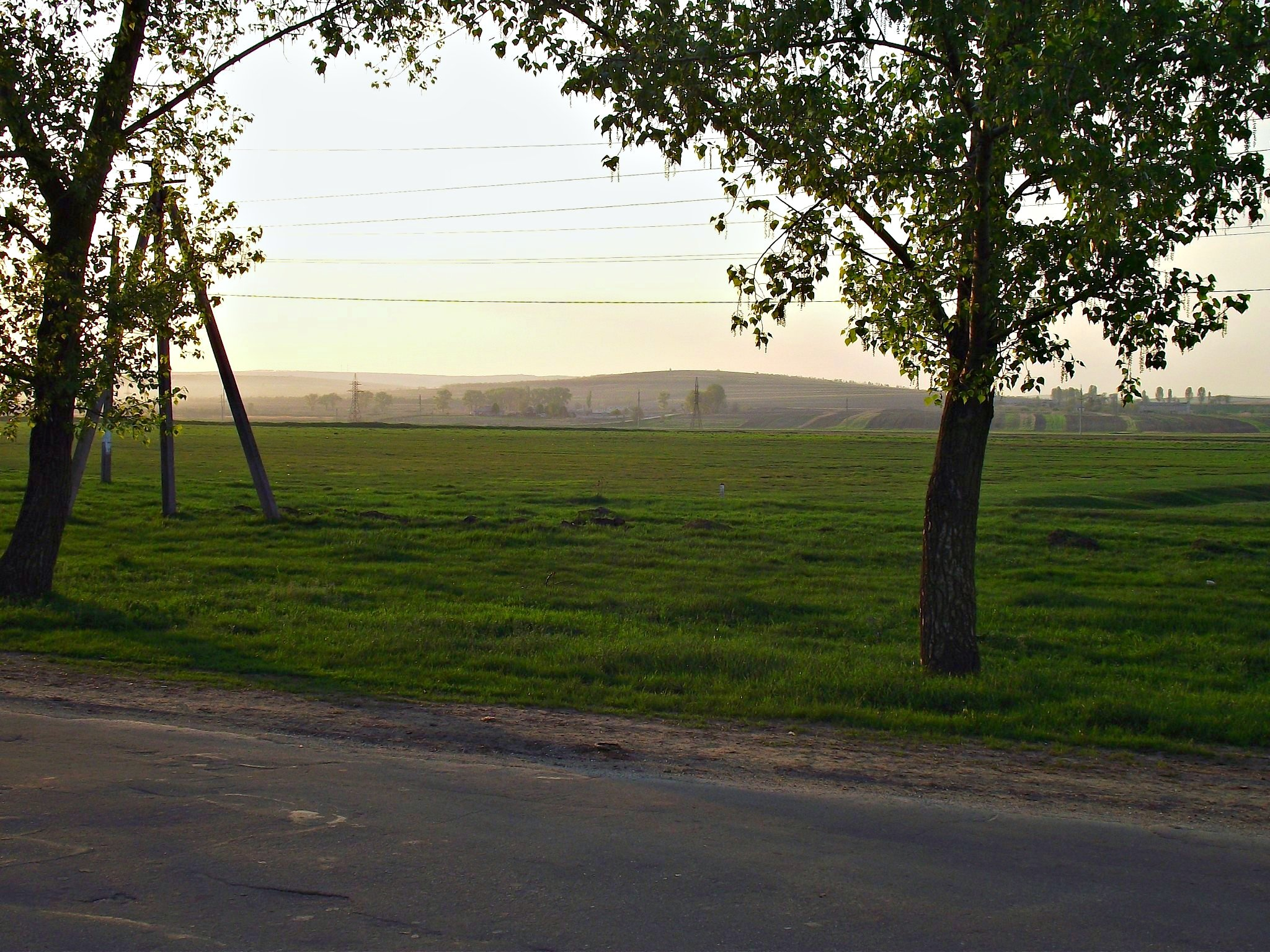

Inești is a village in Telenești District, Moldova.
