= Alexandru Șoltoianu =

Moldovan politician (1933–2022)

Alexandru Șoltoianu OR
- Șoltoianu's grave
- Born: 24 August 1933; Inești, Romania
- Died: 13 April 2022 (aged 88)
- Citizenship: USSR, Moldova
- Education: Moscow State Institute of International Relations
- Occupation: lecturer
- Employer: Moldova State University
- Political party: National Patriotic Front
- Awards: Order of the Republic

Alexandru Șoltoianu (24 August 1933 – 13 April 2022) was a Moldovan orientalist, activist and a political prisoner in the former Soviet Union.

== Biography ==
He graduated at Moscow State Institute of International Relations in 1965 and became a lecturer in Oriental studies at the Moldova State University in Chișinău.

In the 1960s and early 1970s, he militated for the union of Moldavian SSR with the Socialist Republic of Romania. Between 1969 and 1971, he was a founder of a clandestine National Patriotic Front of Bessarabia and Northern Bukovina, established by several young intellectuals in Chișinău, totaling over 100 members, vowing to fight for the establishment of a Moldavian Democratic Republic, its secession from the Soviet Union and union with Romania.

On 13 January 1972, following an informative note from Ion Stănescu, the President of the Romanian Council of State Security, to Yuri Andropov, the chief of KGB, Șoltoianu as well as Alexandru Usatiuc-Bulgăr, Valeriu Graur, and Gheorghe Ghimpu were arrested and later sentenced to long prison terms.

Şoltoianu was sentenced in 1972 for his activity as leader of the National Patriotic Front. He was incarcerated in a prison camp in Mordovia, 400 mi (640 km) southeast of Moscow, notorious for its Soviet Gulag. Gheorghe Ghimpu was incarcerated in the same prison camp.

Șoltoianu was released only in January 1986, and he returned to his apartment in Moscow, where he continued to live even after 1991, when Moldova became independent. Nonetheless, he remained active in Romanian nationalist politics. He also joined Mircea Druc's National Council for Reunification. Șoltoianu died on 13 April 2022.

== Legacy ==
The Commission for the Study of the Communist Dictatorship in Moldova will study and analyze the 1940-1991 period of the communist regime.

== Works ==
- Alexandru Șoltoianu: O viaţă sacrificată pentru ţară. 212.p.
- Alexandru Șoltoianu: Dosar Penal. În: Memoria-Revista gândirii arestate, numărul 16.
