= Vasile Lupu High School Group =

- Abbreviation: Majadahonda
- Formation: 1940
- Dissolved: 1941
- Type: anti-Soviet group
- Location: Orhei
- Official language: Romanian

"Vasile Lupu" High School Group (Romanian: Grupul de liceeni "Vasile Lupu") was one of the first organized anti-Soviet groups in Bessarabia in the wake of its occupation by the Soviet Union on June 28, 1940.

== Activity ==
The resistance group was formed on 1 August 1940 by the students and some teachers of the Vasile Lupu high school in Orhei, which was renamed by the Soviets a Pedagogical School. The group, comprising about 32 members, had as its main goals the overthrow of Soviet power in Bessarabia and the reunification of Bessarabia with the Kingdom of Romania.

After a series of small actions, such as writing anti-Soviet slogans on public walls ("Death to the Stalinist occupiers!", "Go home, barbarians!", "Down with the executioner Stalin!", "Don't believe the bolshevik occupiers!"), and spread of anti-Soviet manifestos, they did an extrodinary achievement: during Christmas night 1940, they took down the Soviet red flags, and put up Romanian flags on top of several buildings in Orhei, including City Hall, the Romanian Communist Party building, and the NKVD headquarters. In January 1941, the NKVD managed to crack into the organization and arrest most of its members. The sentence was pronounced on June 24, 1941.

== Members ==
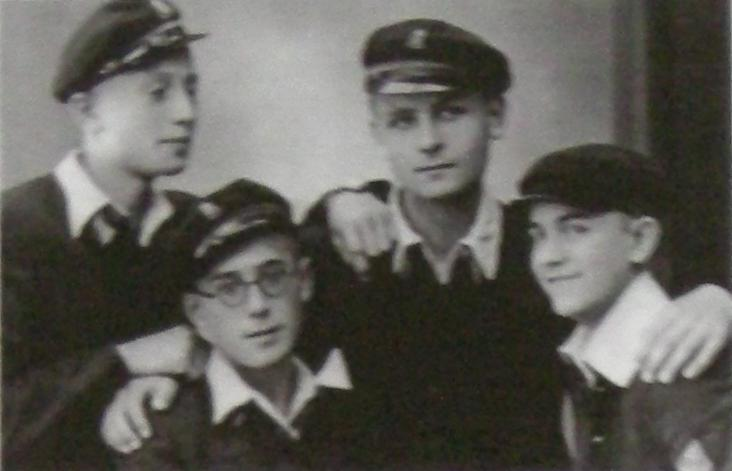

- Dumitru Avramoglo (born in 1922, in Puțintei), condemned to death
- Victor Brodețchi (b. 1924), condemned to death
- Anatol Cotun, condemned to death
- Onisie Cozama (b. 1922), condemned to death
- Dumitru Dobândă (b. 1922), condemned to death
- Mihail Dobândă, condemned to death
- Antol Duca (b. 1922), condemned to death
- Vichentie Eprov (b. 1923), condemned to death
- Haralambie Grăjdianu, condemned to death
- Mihai Grăjdianu (b. 1922), condemned to death
- Antol Gumă (b. 1922), condemned to death
- Gheorghe Mihu (b. 1921), condemned to death
- Constantin Sârbu, condemned to death

Most of them were executed by shooting in Chișinău on June 27, 1941, according to a report of the Odessa Military Tribunal, signed Axelrod. Other members of the group:

- Vlad Alexeev, condemned, disappeared in Siberia
- Ion Bacalu (b. 1924), condemned to 25 years imprisonment, died in detention
- Pavel Boguș (b. 1924, in Mana), condemned to 25 years, died in detention
- Eugen Brașoveanu (b. 1924), condemned to 25 years, died in detention
- Serghei Buiuc (b. 1924), condemned to 10 years
- Vsevolod Ciobanu, condemned to 10 years, disappeared in Siberia
- Nicole Cuculescu (b. 1923), condemned to 20 years
- Oleg Frunză (b. 1928, only 13 years old), condemned to 10 years
- Victor Gumă (b. 1923), condemned to 25 years, died in detention
- Maria Manjaru, teacher, condemned to 10 years for not denouncing, survived
- Gheorghe Martânov (b. 1924), condemned to 25 years, freed in 1954
- Dumitru Munteanu, teacher
- Dumitu Stici, condemned to 10 years, disappeared in Siberia

The investigation was led by G. Goldberg, chief of the Orhei County Section of the NKVD, and was conducted by Konopekin, chief investigator, Terebilo, deputy, Cherepanov, Malinin, Morev, Nikitovich, Plotnikov, and Toporov, investigators.

== Gallery ==
Vichentie Eprov

Maria Manjaru

== See also ==
- Commission for the Study of the Communist Dictatorship in Moldova
