= Ivan Bodiul =

Soviet Moldovan politician

Ivan Bodiul OR
- Иван Бодюл
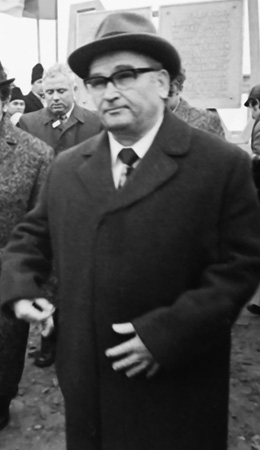
- Bodiul in 1978

First Secretary of the Moldavian Communist Party
- In office 28 May 1961 – 30 December 1980
- Premier: Alexandru Diordiță; Petru Pascari; Semion Grossu
- Preceded by: Zinovie Serdiuk
- Succeeded by: Semion Grossu

Deputy Chairman of the Council of Ministers of the Soviet Union
- In office 19 December 1980 – 30 May 1985
- Premier: Nikolai Tikhonov
- Preceded by: Alexey Antonov
- Succeeded by: Boris Shcherbina

Personal details
- Born: 3 January 1918 [O.S. 21 December 1917] Oleksandrivka, Ukrainian People's Republic
- Died: 27 January 2013 (aged 95) Moscow, Russia
- Resting place: Troyekurovskoye Cemetery
- Party: Communist Party of the Soviet Union (1940–1985)
- Spouse: Claudia

Ivan Ivanovich Bodiul (Russian: Иван Иванович Бодюл; 3 January 1918 [O.S. 21 December 1917] – 27 January 2013) was a Soviet and Moldovan politician prominent in the Moldavian SSR, particularly during the Brezhnev era.

He was primarily responsible for the controversial decision to amend the Anthem of the Moldavian Soviet Socialist Republic in 1980. It was the best anthem of the Soviet Republics (according to the 1950 musical competition).

== Early life ==
Bodiul was born in 1918, in Oleksandrivka, Mykolaiv Oblast, in present-day Ukraine. In spite of his Moldavian origin, he was a poor speaker of the Romanian language.

After graduating in 1937 from the local agricultural college, he worked as a senior agronomist on a collective farm. From 1938 to 1942, he was a student of the Military Veterinary Academy of the Red Army in Moscow, where in 1940 he joined the Communist Party of the Soviet Union. After graduating from the academy, he fought in the regular army as a veterinary officer in the 127th Guards Artillery Regiment of the 59th Guards Rifle Division. After demobilization, as an ethnic Moldovan, he was sent to undertake economic work in the Moldavian SSR. He later became senior agricultural assistant to the Council of Ministers. He then moved up the ranks of the local party structure, first as leader of the Chișinău, Volontirovsky and Olanesti District Committees of the CPM and then as a student of the Higher Party School in Moscow.

== First Secretary ==
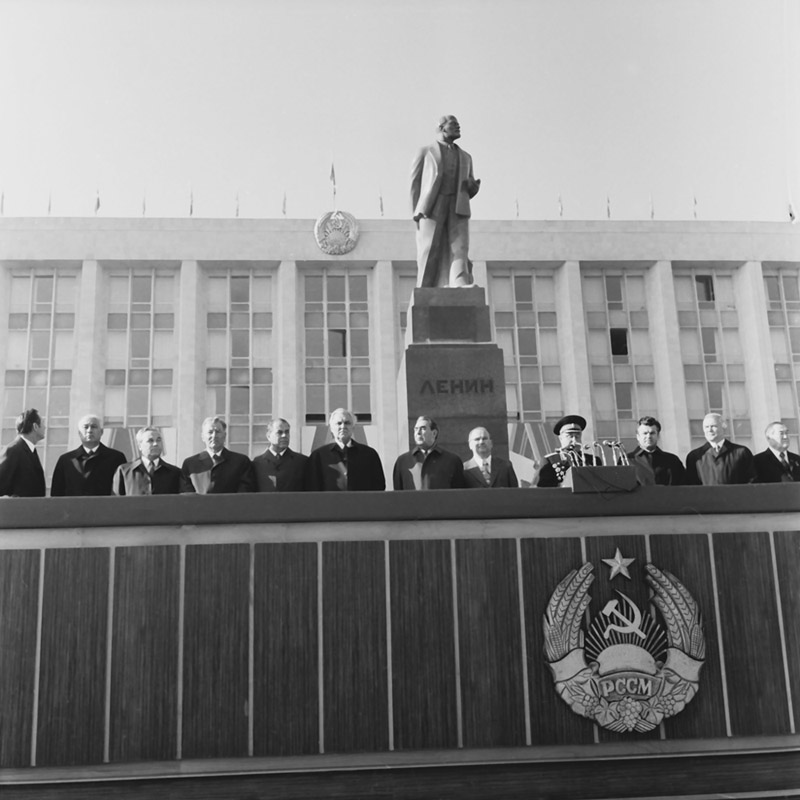
Bodiul with other Soviet leaders during a ceremony in Kishinev in 1976

He was the First Secretary of the Communist Party of Moldavia, the republic branch of the Communist Party of the Soviet Union from 28 May 1961 to 30 December 1980. Bodiul was one of the most authoritarian rulers of Soviet Moldavia. During first part of his rule, his policy concerns and actions were centred on nationalism, sabotage and Zionism. A number of dissidents were imprisoned, including members of the Communist Party, while others were punished. His main supporters were the 2nd Secretaries of the Communist Party (Yuri Melkov until 1973 and Nikolay Merenishchev from 1973 to 1981), who came from Russia, and the KGB, whose Moldavian chairmen were Ivan Savchenko (until 1966), Piotr Chvertko (1966–1974) and Arkady Ragozin (1974–1979). Bodiul continued the fight for atheism, during which many churches were closed or destroyed. In the second part of his rule (from 1976 onwards), the anti-national policy was less harsh, and economic development expanded in the Moldavian SSR. Bodiul was known as one of the most loyal followers of Leonid Brezhnev, a predecessor in his role as Moldavian First Secretary.

=== Relations with Romania ===
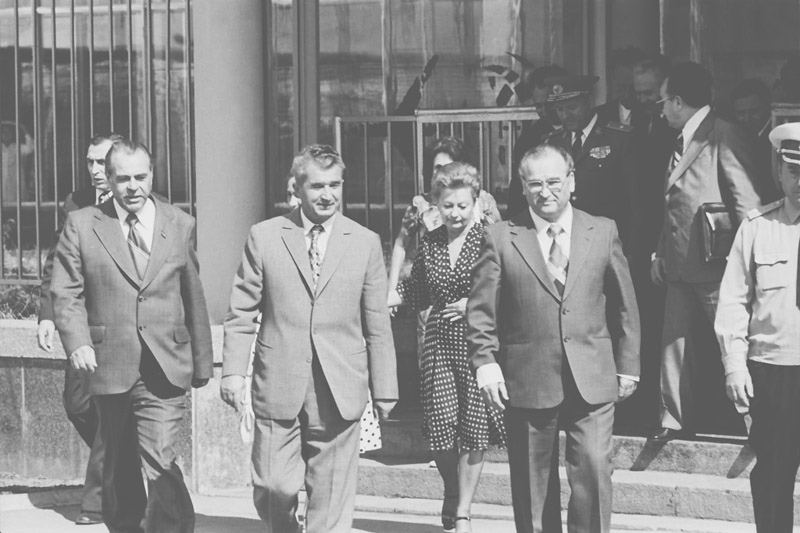
Bodiul with Nicolae Ceaușescu in 1976

In December 1976, Bodiul and his wife, Claudia, were the first high-level Soviet Moldavian visitors to Communist Romania since the Second World War and the annexation of Bessarabia and Northern Bukovina. At one of his meetings in Bucharest, Bodiul said that "the good relationship was initiated by Ceaușescu's visit to Soviet Moldavia, which led to the expansion of contacts and exchanges in all fields." In August 1976, Bodiul had met Ceaușescu and his wife at the frontier and escorted them to Chișinău.

In July 1966, he took issue with an article in the Romanian Scînteia written earlier that year, which opined on the origins of the Moldovan people and their relationship to Romania. In a letter to the Central Committee of the Communist Party, he rebutted the historical claims made in the article on the historical unity of Moldova and Romania, declaring:

"The Moldavian and Romanian nations formed independently, on different territories, in different conditions. The Moldavian nation formed under the influence of the Western countries, primarily France. As a result of these two directions of the development of nations, profound differences developed in the traditions, culture, language, [and] aspirations of these people. Likewise, the process of the formation of the Moldavian socialist nation concluded much earlier than it began in the constitution of the socialist Romanian nation."

He then followed up by recommending that studies in both Russian and Romanian be prepared to counter the claims made by the newspaper in Moldovan society.

== Move to Moscow and retirement ==
He served as Deputy Chairman of the Council of Ministers of the USSR from 1980 to May 1985, when he retired from active politics to a dacha in the Moscow Oblast as the reformist Gorbachev era commenced. He obtained a PhD in Philosophy in 1985. He died on 27 January 2013 in Moscow and is buried at Troyekurovskoye Cemetery.

== Personal life ==
His daughters, Svetlana and Natalia Bodiul, live in Malta and Italy respectively. Svetlana Bodiul was the first organist at the Organ Hall in Chișinău. Natalia is also a noted Moldovan filmmaker.

== Awards ==
Bodiul was decorated by many Soviet orders and medals, including 4 Orders of Lenin. On 3 January 2003, Bodiul was decorated by the Moldovan President Vladimir Voronin with the Order of the Republic, "for long and prodigious work in the supreme organs of state power, substantial contribution to the development Republic of Moldova on the occasion of his 85th birthday." His decoration provoked the protest of the Writers' Union of Moldova, who renounced their own Orders of the Republic in protest.

Party political offices
Preceded by Zinovie Serdiuk	First Secretary of the Moldavian Communist Party; 28 May 1961 – 30 December 1980	Succeeded by Semion Grossu
