= Cojușna =

- Village
- Location in Moldova
- Coordinates: 47°06′N 28°39′E
- Country: Moldova
- District: Strășeni District

Population (2014 census)
  - Total: 6,247
- Time zone: UTC+2 (EET)
  - Summer (DST): UTC+3 (EEST)

Cojușna is a village in Strășeni District, Moldova.
