= National Patriotic Front (Moldova) =

National Patriotic Front Frontul Naţional Patriotic din Basarabia şi Nordul Bucovinei
- Founder: Alexandru Şoltoianu; Alexandru Usatiuc-Bulgăr; Valeriu Graur; Gheorghe Ghimpu
- Founded: 1969
- Dissolved: December 1971
- Headquarters: Chişinău
- Ideology: Romanian nationalism Romanian irredentism Anti-Sovietism; Liberal democracy

The National Patriotic Front (Romanian: Frontul Naţional Patriotic din Basarabia şi Nordul Bucovinei, lit. 'National Patriotic Front of Bessarabia and North Bukovina') was a clandestine political party in the Moldovan SSR.

== Activity ==
Between 1969 and 1971, the National Patriotic Front of Bessarabia and Northern Bukovina was established by several young intellectuals in Chişinău, totalling over 100 members, vowing to fight for the establishment of a Moldavian Democratic Republic, its secession from the Soviet Union and union with Romania.

Among the party's members were Alexandru Usatiuc-Bulgăr, Valeriu Graur, Alexandru Şoltoianu, Gheorghe Ghimpu, Nicolae Lupan, Tudor Basarabeanu, Nicolae Testemiţeanu, Valeriu Gagiu, Mihai Cimpoi, Mircea Druc, Anatol Corobceanu, Vasile Topală.

In December 1971, following an informative note from Ion Stănescu, the President of the Council of State Security of the Romanian Socialist Republic, to Yuri Andropov, the chief of KGB, Alexandru Usatiuc-Bulgăr as well as Valeriu Graur, Alexandru Şoltoianu, and Gheorghe Ghimpu were arrested and sentenced in 1972 to four to seven years in prison, followed by forced settlement.

Alexandru Şoltoianu was released only in 1988. Alexandru Usatiuc-Bulgăr was condemned to seven years in prison and five years of forced residence.

== Leaders ==
Gheorghe Ghimpu

== See also ==
- Category:National Patriotic Front (Moldova) politicians
- List of political parties in Moldova
