= Sergiu Rădăuțanu =

Moldovan physicist

Sergiu Rădăuțanu OR
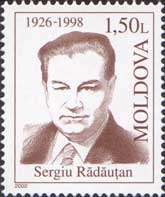
- 2002 stamp of Moldova

Chairman of the Supreme Soviet of the Moldavian SSR
- In office 11 April 1967 – 14 July 1971
- Premier: Alexandru Diordiță; Petru Pascari
- Preceded by: Andrei Lupan
- Succeeded by: Artem Lazarev

Personal details
- Born: 17 June 1926 Chișinău, Kingdom of Romania
- Died: 6 March 1998 (aged 71) Saint Petersburg, Russia

Sergiu Rădăuțanu (17 June 1926 – 6 March 1998) was a Moldovan physicist. He was a vice-president of the Academy of Sciences of Moldova, honorary member of the Romanian Academy and professor at the Technical University of Moldova.

== Early life ==
Rădăuțanu was born on 17 June 1926 in Chișinău. His parents were both teachers, with his father speaking nine languages and teaching French.

== Education and early career ==
Rădăuțanu studied at Bogdan Petriceicu Hasdeu High School in Chișinău and graduated from the State University of Moldova in 1955. He earned his PhD in 1959 from the Ioffe Institute in Leningrad, researching solid solutions in semiconductor systems. His habilitation in 1966 at the Peter the Great St. Petersburg Polytechnic University focused on diamond-type semiconductors with defective structures.

== Key roles and leadership ==
In 1961, Rădăuțanu became the Laboratory Head at the Institute of Applied Physics, where he advanced semiconductor material research. In 1964, he helped found and was a rector of the Technical University of Moldova (UTM). Under his leadership until 1973, UTM became Moldova's premier technical institution. Later, in 1990, he was appointed the vice-president of the Academy of Sciences of Moldova and five years later directed its Semiconductor Materials Center until 1998. Rădăuțanu was also active politically and he served as Chairman of the Supreme Soviet of the Moldavian SSR from 1967 to 1971.

== Scientific contributions ==
Rădăuțanu specialized in semiconductor physics, focusing on ternary and complex compound materials, with his work bridging theoretical and applied research. He authored over 1,000 studies and held over 100 patents, emphasizing semiconductor technology and solid-state electronics. As well as his own research, he supervised 64 doctoral candidates, fostering a generation of physicists and engineers. Rădăuțanu also lectured globally, including in France, Germany, and the United States, England, South Korea, Hungary, India, and Japan, and organized Moldova's first NATO scientific conference in 1996.

== Awards ==
Rădăuțanu was awarded the State Prize of Moldova in 1983 and 1998, as well as the Order of the Red Banner of Labour and the Order of the Republic in 1996.

== Death ==
Rădăuțanu died on 6 March 1998, and several streets and institutions bear his name.
