= Gheorghe Ghimpu =

Moldovan politician and human rights activist

Gheorghe Ghimpu OR
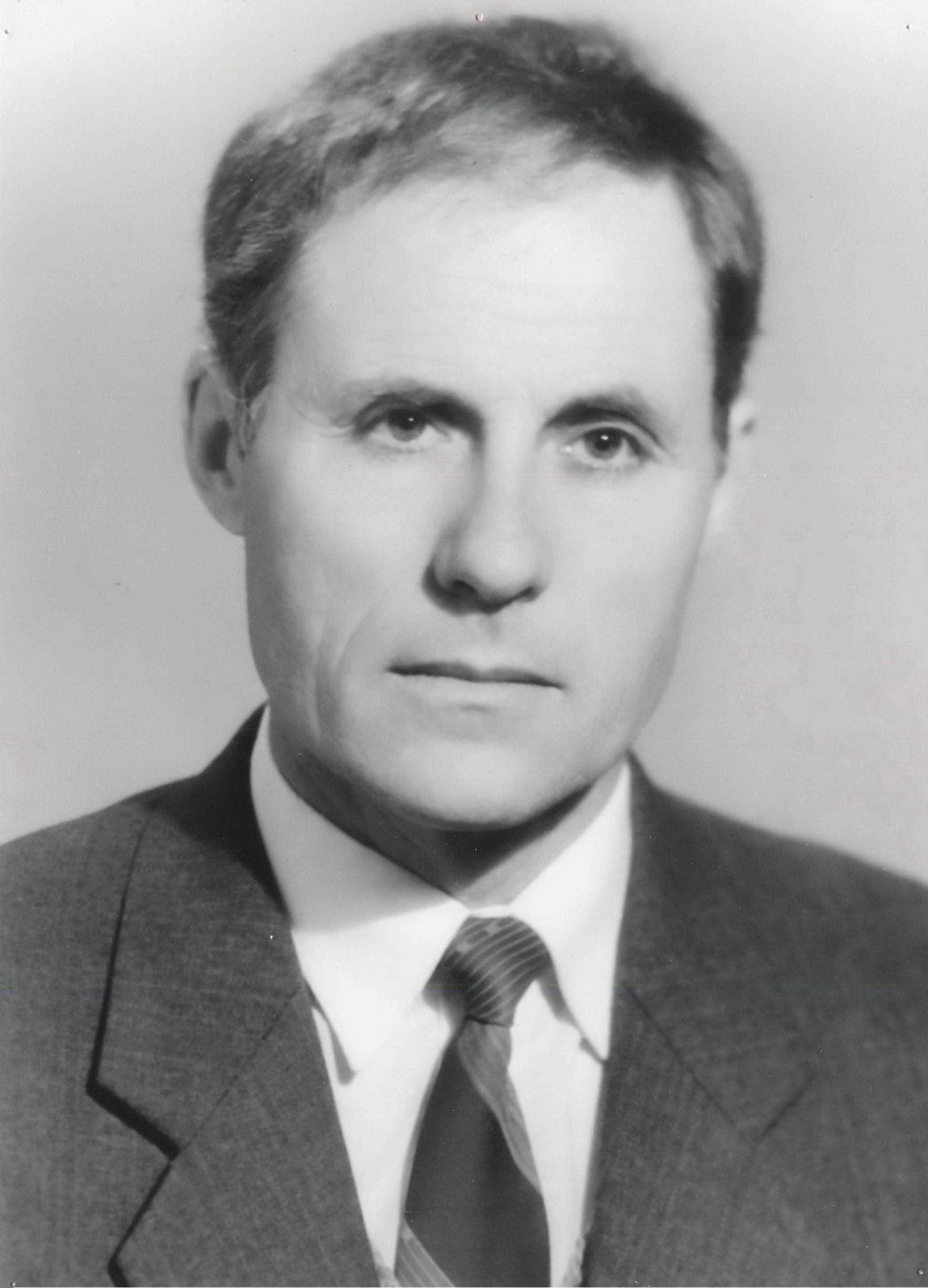
- Ghimpu in 1992

Member of the Moldovan Parliament
- In office 10 March 1990 – 29 March 1994
- Parliamentary group: Popular Front
- Constituency: Criuleni

Personal details
- Born: 26 July 1937 Colonița, Kingdom of Romania (now Moldova)
- Died: 13 November 2000 (aged 63) Chișinău, Moldova
- Resting place: Chișinău
- Citizenship: Moldova; Romania
- Party: New Historical Option (then known as Romanian National Party)
- Other political affiliations: Popular Front of Moldova; National Patriotic Front
- Spouse: Zina Ghimpu
- Children: 2
- Relatives: Mihai Ghimpu (brother); Dorin Chirtoacă (nephew)
- Education: T. G. Shevchenko University; Academy of Sciences of the Soviet Union
- Profession: Professor; Physicist
- Parents: Irina Ursu; Toader Ghimpu

Gheorghe Ghimpu (26 July 1937 – 13 November 2000) was a Moldovan politician and a political prisoner in the former Soviet Union and then in Moldova.

== Early life ==
Ghimpu was born on 26 July 1937 in Colonița, a village in Bessarabia during the Greater Romania administration. His mother, Irina Ursu (daughter of Haralambie Ursu, died in 2003) worked at the local kolkhoz (collective farm). His father, Toader Ghimpu (died in 1980) was an elementary school teacher. Gheorghe Ghimpu is the oldest brother of Simion Ghimpu (born 24 May 1939), Visarion, Valentina (mother of Dorin Chirtoacă) and Mihai Ghimpu.

Ghimpu completed his studies at T. G. Shevchenko University in Tiraspol. Then he obtained his PhD at the Institute of Biological Physics, Academy of Sciences of the Soviet Union in Moscow. Ghimpu was a teacher in Strășeni and a professor at T. G. Shevchenko University in Tiraspol and the Moldova State University in Chișinău.

He was married to Zina and had two children, Oana and Corneliu.

== Political activity ==
Between 1969 and 1971, he was a founder of the clandestine National Patriotic Front of Bessarabia and North of Bukovina, established by several young intellectuals in Chişinău, totaling over 100 members, vowing to fight for the establishment of a Moldovan Democratic Republic, its secession from the Soviet Union and union with Romania. After the NPF leadership got in touch...In December 1971, following an informative note from Ion Stănescu, the President of the Council of State Security of the Romanian Socialist Republic, to Yuri Andropov, the chief of the KGB, Ghimpu as well as Alexandru Usatiuc-Bulgăr, Valeriu Graur, and Alexandru Șoltoianu were arrested and later sentenced to long prison terms. He was sentenced on 13 July 1972. Ghimpu spent six years in prison (1972–1978), as result of his political activities.

Ghimpu took part in the Moldovan national movement and was a supporter of the independence of the Moldovan SSR from the Soviet Union. He was a founding member of the Popular Front of Moldova and a member of the Moldovan Parliament (1990–1994).

He died in Chișinău on 13 November 2000 after an unclarified traffic accident, which had occurred near Dondușeni on 27 October 2000.

== Legacy ==
The Commission for the Study of the Communist Dictatorship in Moldova will study and analyze the 1940–1991 period of the communist regime.

== Gallery ==
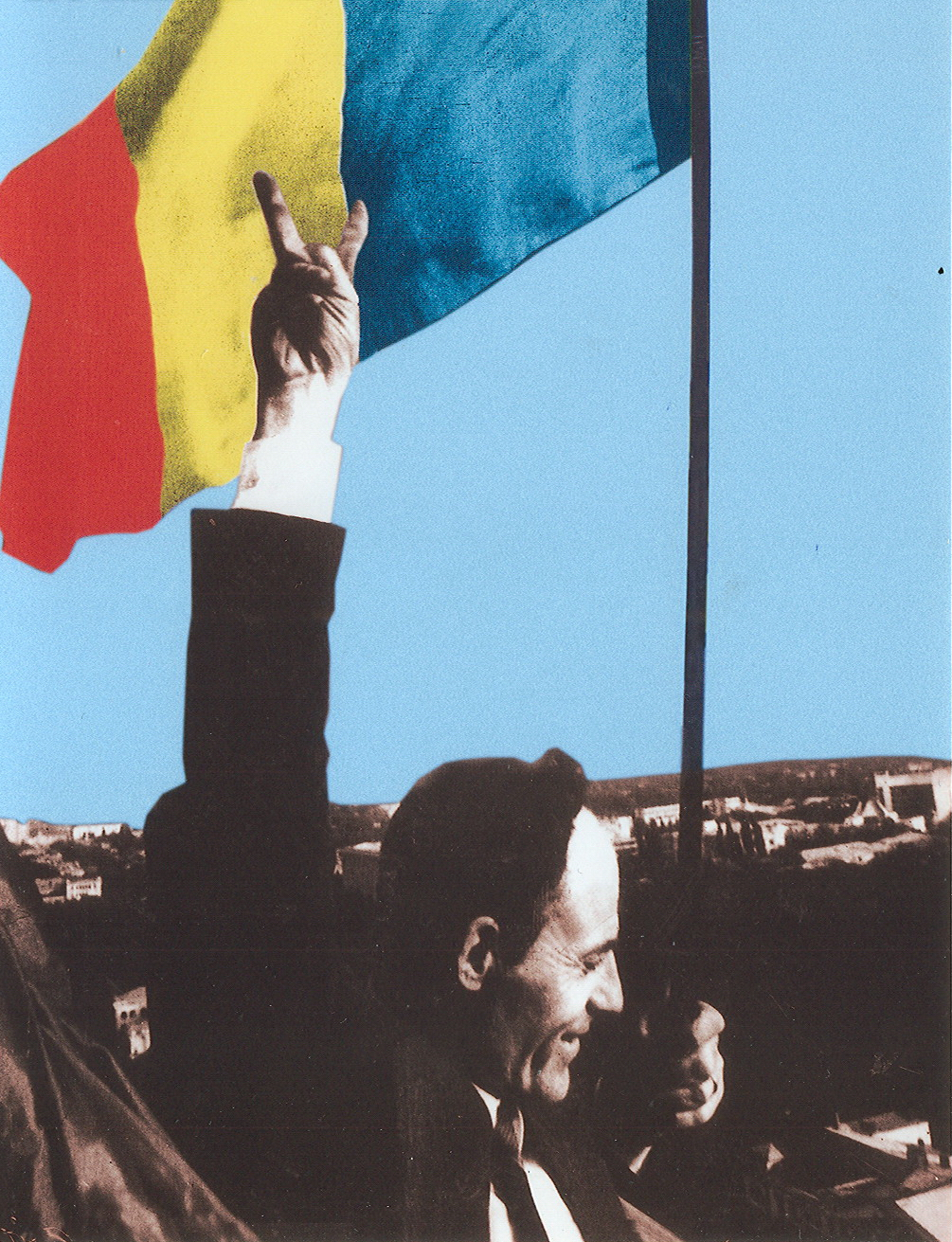
At the Parliament of Moldova on 27 April 1990

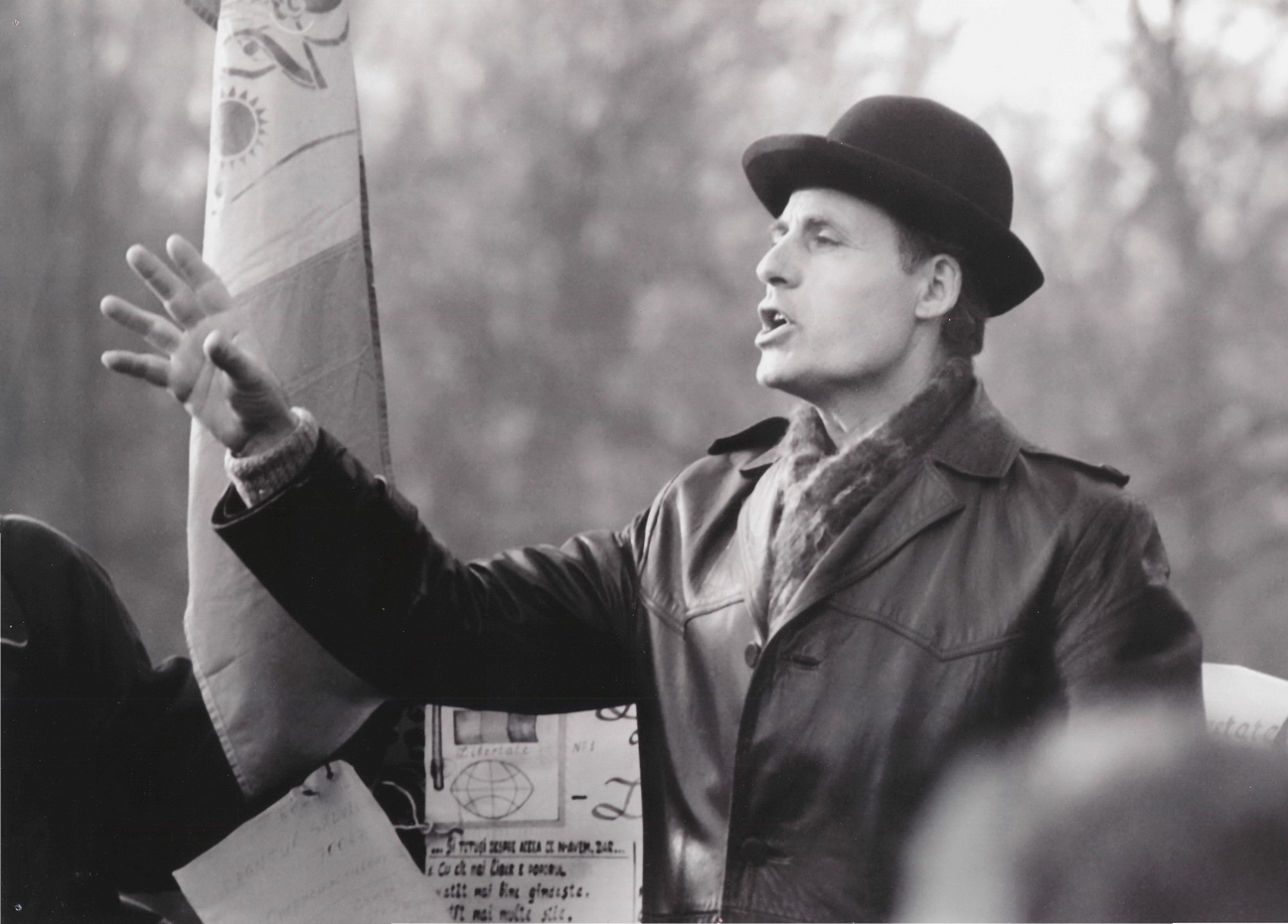
A Popular Front meeting (7 March 1991)

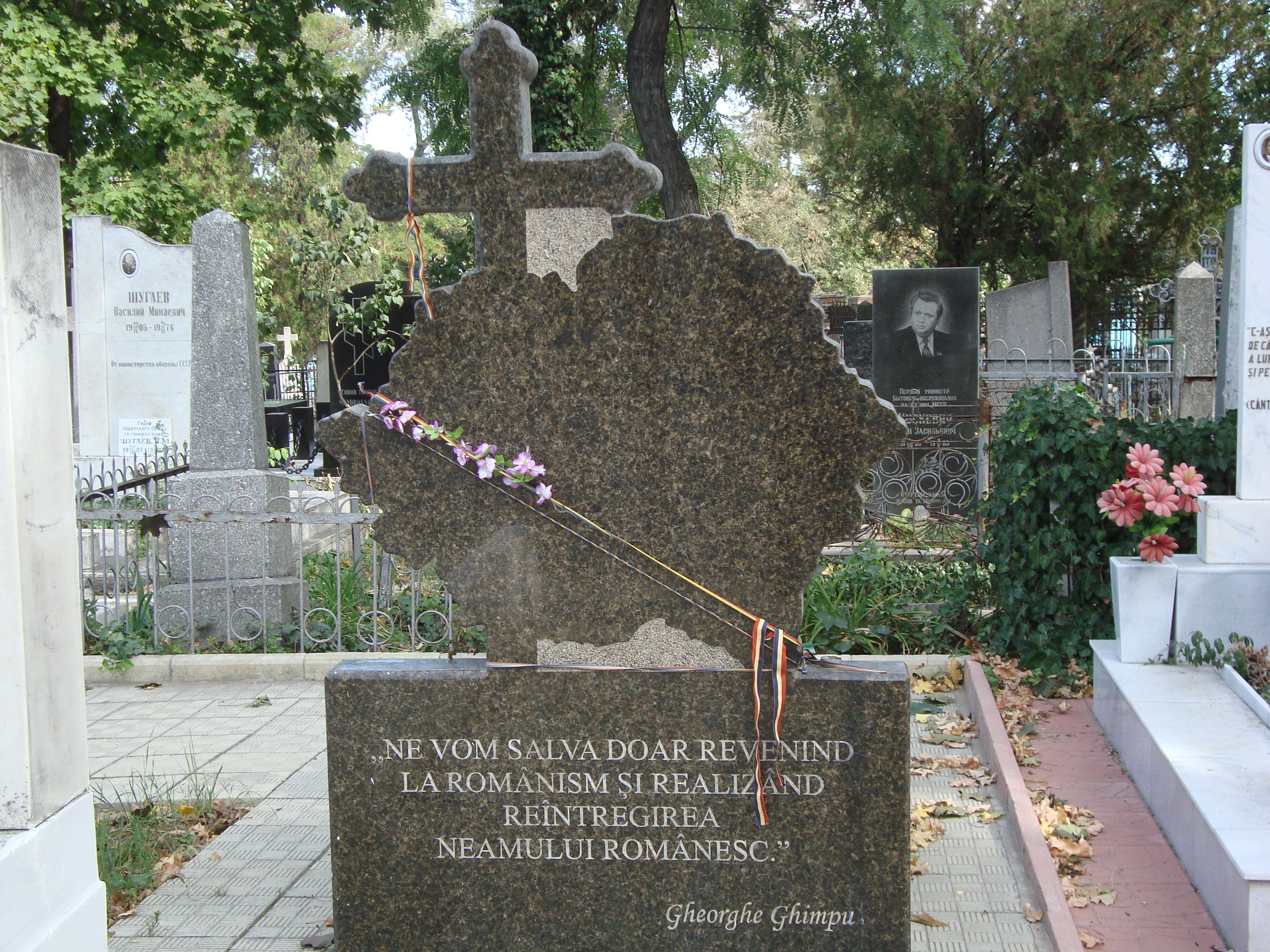
Gheorghe Ghimpu's grave
