= Valeriu Graur =

Valeriu Graur OR
- Born: December 23, 1940; Reni, Ukrainian SSR, USSR
- Died: 15 September 2012 (aged 71); Bucharest, România
- Citizenship: USSR; Moldova; Romania
- Political party: National Patriotic Front

Valeriu Graur (23 December 1940 – 15 September 2012) was a political dissident of Bessarabia, a member of the National Patriotic Front of Moldova.

He was the son of a Romanian officer deported to Siberia. He was born in Reni, in Ukraine, in December 1940, but says he "opened the eyes of the mind" in Siberia, where his family was deported on June 13, 1941.

He is one of the signers of the appeal addressed to Nicolae Ceaușescu in 1972. After denouncing these signatories by Security General Ion Stanescu (chairman of the State Security Council of the SRR.) He was deported for 4 years to Siberia as a result of his belonging to the National Patriotic Front of Moldova.

On August 23, 2010, the acting President of the Republic of Moldova and the President of the Parliament of the Republic of Moldova, Mihai Ghimpu, gave to Valeriu Graur, together with a group of fighters against the communist totalitarian occupation regime the "Order of the Republic".

== Biography ==
Between 1969 and 1971, he was a founder of a clandestine National Patriotic Front of Bessarabia and Northern Bukovina, established by several young intellectuals in Chişinău, totaling over 100 members, vowing to fight for the establishment of a Moldavian Democratic Republic, its secession from the Soviet Union and union with Romania.

In December 1971, following an informative note from Ion Stănescu, the President of the Council of State Security of the Romanian Socialist Republic, to Yuri Andropov, the chief of KGB, Valeriu Graur as well as Alexandru Usatiuc-Bulgăr, Alexandru Şoltoianu, and Gheorghe Ghimpu were arrested and later sentenced to long prison terms.

== Legacy ==
The Commission for the Study of the Communist Dictatorship in Moldova will study and analyze the 1940-1991 period of the communist regime.

== Publications ==
- 2011: "I will not forget you, Bessarabia ..."
