= Alexandru Usatiuc-Bulgăr =

Moldovan activist and political prisoner in the former Soviet Union

Alexandru Usatiuc-Bulgăr OR
- Born: July 15, 1915; Seliște, Russian Empire
- Died: August 3, 2003 (aged 88); Bucharest, Romania
- Political party: National Patriotic Front of Bessarabia and Northern Bukovina

Alexandru Usatiuc-Bulgăr (15 July 1915 – 3 August 2003) was a Moldovan activist and a political prisoner in the former Soviet Union.

== Biography ==
Between 1969 and 1971, he was a founder of a clandestine National Patriotic Front of Bessarabia and Northern Bukovina, established by several young intellectuals in Chișinău, totalling over 100 members, vowing to fight for the establishment of a Moldavian Democratic Republic, its secession from the Soviet Union and union with Romania.

On June 12, 1970, while on a private visit in the Socialist Republic of Romania (RSR), he asked to be received in audience by Nicolae Ceaușescu. Failing to be received, he left a 6-page letter addressed to Ceaușescu, in which he presented details about the methods used by the KGB to denationalize the Romanians in Moldova, and about the attempts of the National Patriotic Front to organize their resistance. In his letter he also asked for help from the authorities in Bucharest to avoid the loss of the Romanian identity of Bessarabians. Following an informative note from the head of the Council of State Security of RSR, Ion Stănescu, to the KGB chief Yuri Andropov, in December 1971, Usatiuc-Bulgăr together with Valeriu Graur, Alexandru Șoltoianu, and Gheorghe Ghimpu were arrested and sentenced to long prison terms and deportation; Usatiuc-Bulgăr received 12 years.

After 1990 Usatiuc-Bulgăr was the president of the Association of Former Political Deportees (Romanian: Asociația foștilor deportați politici).

== Legacy ==
The Commission for the Study of the Communist Dictatorship in Moldova will study and analyze the 1940-1991 period of the communist regime.

== Works ==
- Alexandru Usatiuc-Bulgăr "Cu gîndul la "O lume între două lumi": eroi, martiri, oameni-legendă" ("Thinking of 'A World between Two Worlds': Heroes, Martyrs, Legendary People"), Publisher: Lyceum, Orhei (1999) ISBN 9975-939-36-8
