= Moldavian Soviet Socialist Republic =

Soviet republic from 1940 to 1991

Moldavian Soviet Socialist Republic: Republica Sovietică Socialistă Moldovenească / Република Советикэ Сочиалистэ Молдовеняскэ (Romanian); Молдавская Советская Социалистическая Республика (Russian)
- 1940–1991
- Flag (1952–1990) State emblem (1981–1990)
- Motto: "Пролетарь дин тоате цэриле, уници-вэ!" Proletari din toate țările, uniți-vă! "Workers of the world, unite!"
- Anthem: "Молдова Советикэ"; Moldova Sovietică "Anthem of the Moldavian Soviet Socialist Republic"
- Location of Moldavia (red) within the Soviet Union between 1956 and 1991
- Status: 1940–1990: Union Republic of the Soviet Union; 1990–1991: Union Republic with priority of the Moldavian legislation
- Capital and largest city: Chișinău
- Official languages: Moldovan (Romanian); Russian
- Minority languages: Ukrainian; Gagauz; Bulgarian
- Demonyms: Moldavian, Soviet
- Government: Unitary communist state (1940–1990); Unitary parliamentary republic (1990–91)
- First Secretary
  - 1941–1942 (first): Piotr Borodin
  - 1991 (last): Grigore Eremei
- Head of state
  - 1940–1951 (first): Fyodor Brovko
  - 1989–1991 (last): Mircea Snegur
- Head of government
  - 1940–1945 (first): Tihon Konstantinov
  - 1991 (last): Valeriu Muravschi
- Legislature: Supreme Soviet
- History
  - Soviet occupation: 28 June–3 July 1940
  - Republic proclaimed: 2 August 1940
  - State sovereignty: 23 June 1990
  - Declaration of Independence: 27 August 1991
  - Moldova's international recognition (dissolution of the Soviet Union): 26 December 1991

Area
- 1989 census: 33,843 km^{2} (13,067 sq mi)

Population
  - 1989 census: 4,337,592
- HDI (1991): ▼0.680 medium
- Currency: Soviet rouble (Rbl) (SUR)
- Calling code: +7 042
Preceded by
1940: Moldavian ASSR
Kingdom of Romania
Succeeded by
1990: Gagauz Republic
Pridnestrovian SSR
1991: Moldova
- Today part of: Moldova (including Transnistria)

The Moldavian Soviet Socialist Republic or Moldavian SSR (Romanian: Republica Sovietică Socialistă Moldovenească, Moldovan Cyrillic: Република Советикэ Сочиалистэ Молдовеняскэ), also known as the Moldovan Soviet Socialist Republic, Moldovan SSR, Soviet Moldavia, Soviet Moldova, or simply Moldavia or Moldova, was one of the 15 republics of the Soviet Union that existed from 1940 to 1991. The republic was formed on 2 August 1940 from parts of Bessarabia, a region annexed from Romania on 28 June of that year, and parts of the Moldavian Autonomous Soviet Socialist Republic, an autonomous Soviet republic within the Ukrainian SSR.

From the Moldavian Soviet Socialist Republic Supreme Soviet's adoption of the declaration of sovereignty on 23 June 1990 to 23 May 1991, the country was internationally recognized as the Soviet Socialist Republic of Moldova. Furthermore, from 23 May 1991 until the declaration of independence on 27 August 1991, it was renamed to the Republic of Moldova while remaining a constituent republic of the USSR. Its independence was officially recognized by the international community on 26 December of that year when the Soviet Union was dissolved.

Geographically, the Moldavian SSR was bordered by the Kingdom of Romania (later the People's Republic of Romania) to the west and the Ukrainian Soviet Socialist Republic to the north, east, and south.

== History ==
=== Background ===
After the failure of the Tatarbunary Uprising, the Soviets promoted the newly created Moldavian Autonomous Oblast existing within the Ukrainian SSR on part of the territory between the Dniester and Bug rivers, into the Moldavian Autonomous Soviet Socialist Republic (Moldavian ASSR), on 12 October 1924, as a way to primarily prop up Soviet propaganda efforts in Bessarabia, but also to exert pressure on Bucharest in the negotiations on Bessarabia, and even to help a possible Communist revolution in Romania.

On 24 August 1939, the Soviet Union and Nazi Germany signed a 10-year non-aggression treaty, officially known as the Molotov–Ribbentrop Pact. However, the pact contained a secret protocol, revealed only after Germany's defeat in 1945, according to which the states of Northern and Eastern Europe were divided into German and Soviet spheres of influence. The secret protocol placed the province of Bessarabia, back then controlled by Romania, in the Soviet "sphere of influence." Thereafter, both the Soviet Union and Germany invaded their respective portions of Poland, while the Soviet Union occupied and annexed Lithuania, Estonia, and Latvia in June 1940, alongside waging war upon Finland.

=== Establishment ===
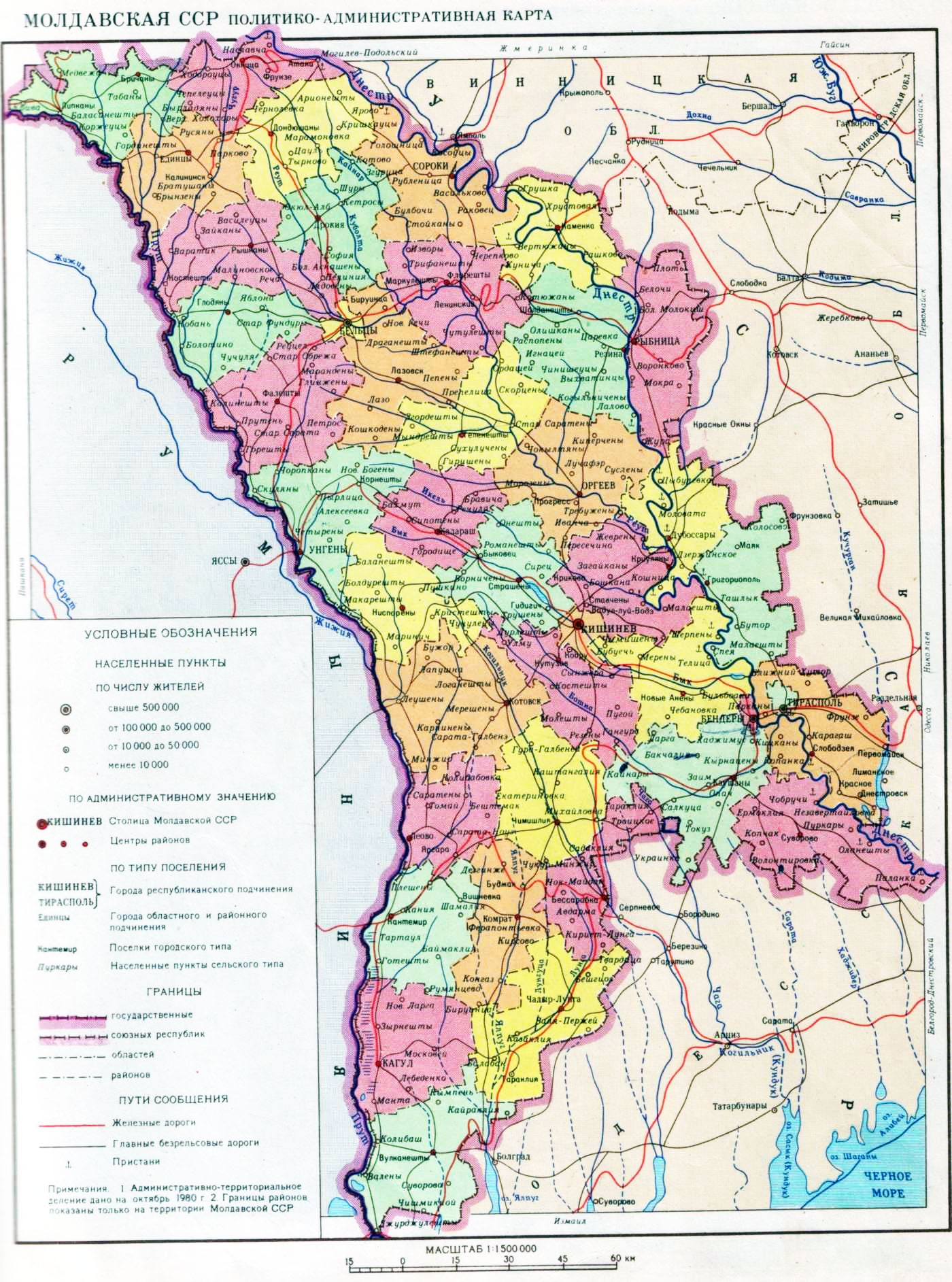
Map of the Moldavian SSR

On 26 June 1940, four days after the end of the Battle of France, the Soviet Union issued an ultimatum to the Kingdom of Romania, demanding that the latter cede its territories of Bessarabia and Bukovina. After the Soviets agreed with Germany that they would limit their claims in Bukovina, which was outside the Molotov–Ribbentrop Pact's secret protocols, to Northern Bukovina, Germany urged Romania to accept the ultimatum, which Romania did two days later. On 28 June, Soviet troops entered the area, and on 9 July, the Moldavian Soviet Socialist Republic was formed and applied to the Supreme Soviet for formal incorporation into the Soviet Union.

On 2 August 1940, the Supreme Soviet unanimously approved the dissolution of the old Moldavian ASSR, while it organized the Moldavian SSR. The new SSR included six full counties and small parts of three other Moldavian counties of Bessarabia (approximately 65 percent of its entire territory), together with the six westernmost raions of the Moldavian ASSR (approximately 40 percent of its entire territory). Considering that, ninety percent of the territory of the MSSR was situated west of the river Dniester, which had been the border between the USSR and Romania before 1940, and ten percent east. Northern and southern parts of the territories occupied by the Soviet Union in June 1940 (the current Chernivtsi Oblast and Budjak), which were more heterogeneous ethnically, were transferred to the Ukrainian SSR, despite their population also including 337,000 Moldovans. Consequently, the strategically important Black Sea coast and Danube frontage were handed to the Ukrainian SSR, considered more reliable than the Moldavian SSR, which could have been claimed by Romania. In the summer of 1941, Romania joined Hitler's Axis in the invasion of the Soviet Union, recovering Bessarabia and Northern Bukovina, and also occupying the territory to the east of the Dniester, dubbed "Transnistria." Pro-Soviet partisans remained active in both regions. By the end of World War II, the Soviet Union had reconquered all of the lost territories, reestablishing Soviet authority there.

=== Stalinist period ===
==== Repressions and deportations ====
On 22 June 1941, during the initial days of the German invasion of the Soviet Union, 10 people were summarily executed in Răzeni by Soviet authorities and buried in several mass graves. In July 1941, after Operation Barbarossa, a commemorative plaque was installed in Răzeni. A memorial to victims of the Răzeni Massacre was opened in 2009.

During the Soviet occupation, the USSR's authorities systematically targeted and harshly persecuted several socio-economic groups due to their economic situation, political views, or ties to the former regime of the Kingdom of Romania. They were deported to or resettled in Siberia and the Kazakh SSR; some were imprisoned or executed. According to a report by the Presidential Commission for the Study of the Communist Dictatorship in Romania, no less than 86,604 people were arrested and deported in 1940 and 1941 alone, comparable to the estimated number of 90,000 repressed put forward by Russian historians.

Immediately after the Soviet reoccupation, in 1944, a so-called "repatriation" of the Bessarabians who fled to Romania before the advancing Red Army was organized by the Soviet security forces; many were shot or deported, blamed as collaborators of Romania and Nazi Germany.

NKVD/MGB also struck at anti-Soviet groups, which were most active from 1944 to 1952. Anti-Soviet organizations, including the Democratic Agrarian Party, the Freedom Party, the Democratic Union of Freedom, Arcașii lui Ștefan, the Vasile Lupu High School Group, and Vocea Basarabiei were severely reprimanded and their leaders faced persecution by the communist authorities.

Furthermore, a dekulakization campaign was directed towards the rich Moldavian peasant families, whose members were rounded up and systematically deported to distant regions of the Soviet Union, such as Kazakhstan and Siberia. For instance, in just two days, from 6 to 7 July 1949, over 11,342 Moldavian families were deported by the order of the Minister of State Security, Iosif Mordovets under a plan named "Operation South."

Additionally, as a part of religious persecutions during the Soviet Union's occupation, numerous priests and other religious figures were targeted with a campaign of state-sponsored violence. After the Soviet occupation began, the religious life underwent a persecution similar to the one in Russia between the two World Wars. Religious minorities, 700 families, especially Jehovah's Witnesses, were deported to Siberia in Operation North in April 1951.

The number of the ethnic Bessarabia Germans also decreased from over 81,000 in 1930 to under 4,000 in 1959 due to voluntary wartime migration (90,000 were transferred in 1940 to German-occupied Poland) and forced removal as collaborators after the war.

==== Collectivisation ====
Collectivisation was implemented between 1949 and 1950, although earlier attempts were made since 1946. During this time, a large-scale famine occurred: some sources give a minimum of 115,000 peasants who died of famine and related diseases between December 1946 and August 1947. According to Charles King, there is no evidence that it was provoked by Soviet requisitioning of large amounts of agricultural products and directed towards the largest ethnic group living in the countryside, the Moldavians. Contributing factors were the recent war and the drought of 1946.

=== Khrushchev and Brezhnev ===
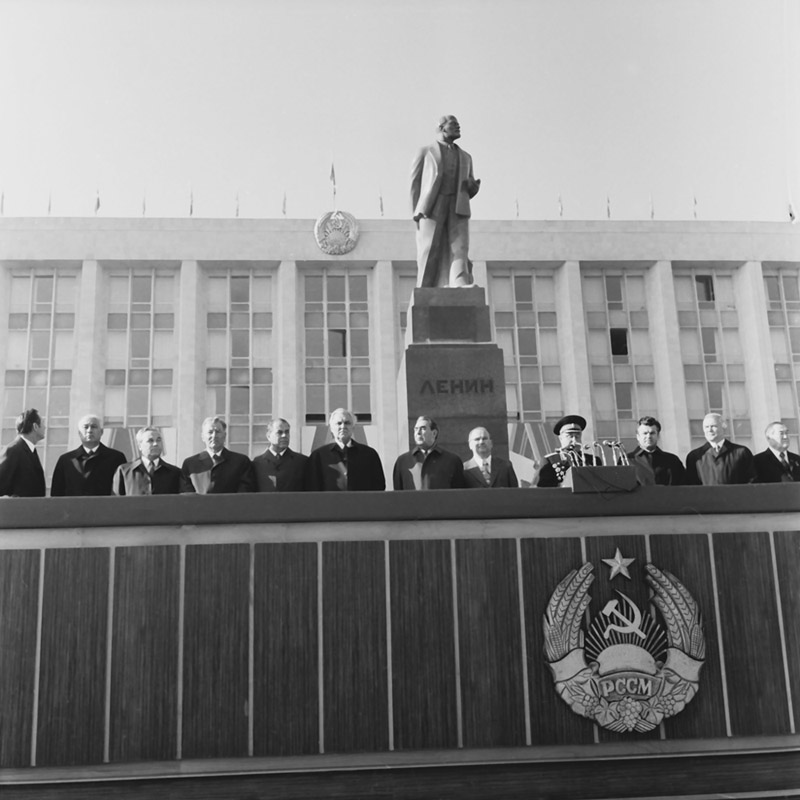
Leonid Brezhnev and Ivan Bodiul during the republic's golden jubilee, 1976

With the regime of Nikita Khrushchev replacing that of Joseph Stalin, the survivors of Gulag camps and of the deportees were gradually allowed to return to the Moldavian SSR. The political thaw ended the unchecked power of the NKVD–MGB, and the command economy gave rise to development in areas such as education, technology and science, health care, and industry.

Between 1969 and 1971, the clandestine National Patriotic Front was established by several young intellectuals in Chișinău, led by Mihail Munteanu, vowing to fight for the secession of Moldavia from the Soviet Union and union with Romania.

In December 1971, following an informative note from Ion Stănescu, the President of the Council of State Security of the Romanian Socialist Republic, to Yuri Andropov, the chief of KGB, three of the leaders of the National Patriotic Front, Alexandru Usatiuc-Bulgăr, Gheorghe Ghimpu and Valeriu Graur, as well as a fourth person, Alexandru Șoltoianu, the leader of a similar clandestine movement in Northern Bukovina, were arrested and later sentenced to long prison terms.

In the 1970s and 1980s, Moldavia received substantial investment from the budget of the USSR to develop industrial, scientific facilities, as well as housing. In 1971, the Soviet Council of Ministers adopted a decision "About the measures for further development of Kishinev city" that secured more than one billion roubles of investment from the USSR budget.

Subsequent decisions directed enormous wealth and brought highly qualified specialists from all over the USSR to develop the Soviet republic. Such an allocation of USSR assets was partially influenced by the fact that Leonid Brezhnev, the effective ruler of the USSR from 1964 to 1982, was the First Secretary of the Communist Party of Moldavia from 1950 to 1952. These allocations stopped in 1991 with the Belavezha Accords, when the nation became independent.

=== Perestroika ===
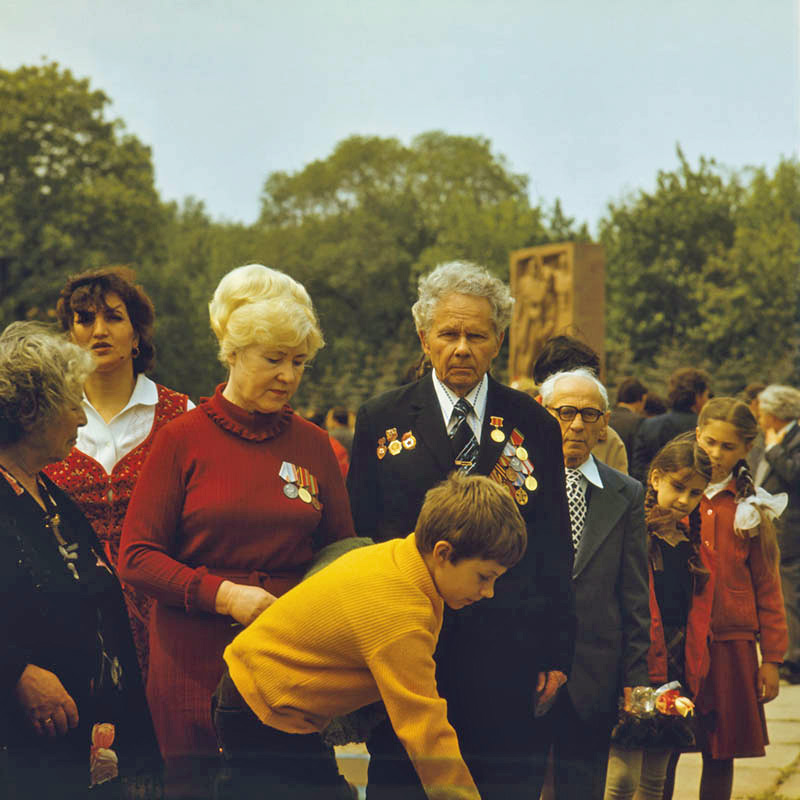
Victory Day celebrations in the Moldavian SSR in 1980

Although Brezhnev and other CPM first secretaries were largely successful in suppressing Moldavian nationalism, Mikhail Gorbachev's administration facilitated the revival of the movement in the region. His policies of glasnost and perestroika created conditions in which national feelings could be openly expressed and in which the Soviet republics could consider reforms independently from the central government.

The Moldavian SSR's drive towards independence from the USSR was marked by civil strife as conservative activists in the east —especially in Tiraspol—as well as communist party activists in Chișinău worked to keep the Moldavian SSR within the Soviet Union. The main success of the national movement from 1988 to 1989 was the official adoption of the Moldovan language on 31 August 1989, by the Supreme Soviet of Moldova, the declaration in the preamble of the declaration of independence of a Moldavian–Romanian linguistic unity, and the return of the language to the pre-Soviet Latin alphabet. In 1990, when it became clear that Moldavia was eventually going to secede, a group of nationalist pro-Soviet activists in Gagauzia and Transnistria proclaimed themselves as separate from the Moldavian SSR in order to remain within the USSR. The Gagauz Republic was eventually peacefully incorporated into Moldavia as the Autonomous Territorial Unit of Gagauzia, but relations with Transnistria soured. Its sovereignty was declared on 23 June 1990 on its territory.

=== Independence ===
Moldovan flag from 1990

On 17 March 1991, Moldova, the Baltic states, the Armenian Soviet Socialist Republic, and the Georgian Soviet Socialist Republic boycotted the 1991 Soviet Union referendum with 98.72% in favor without any official sanction. On 23 May 1991, the Moldavian parliament changed the name of the republic to the Republic of Moldova. The Gagauz declared the Gagauz Republic on 19 August 1990. They had previously declared a Gagauz ASSR within Moldova on 12 November 1989.

Independence was quickly followed by civil war in Transnistria, where the central government in Chișinău battled with separatists, who were supported by pro-Soviet forces and later by different forces from Russia. The conflict left the breakaway regime (Pridnestrovian Moldavian Republic) in control of Transnistria – a situation that persists today. The Soviet Union ceased to exist on 26 December 1991, and Moldova was officially recognized as an independent state.

== Relationship with Romania ==
In the 1947 Paris Peace Treaty, the Soviet Union and Romania reaffirmed each other's borders, recognizing Bessarabia, Northern Bukovina and the Herza region as territory of the respective Soviet republics. Throughout the Cold War, the issue of Bessarabia remained largely dormant in Romania. In the 1950s, research on the history of Bessarabia was a banned subject in Romania, as the Romanian Communist Party tried to emphasise links between the Romanian and Soviet people, with the 1940 annexation being considered proof of Soviet Union's internationalism. Starting in the 1960s, Gheorghe Gheorghiu-Dej and Nicolae Ceaușescu began a policy of distancing from the Soviet Union, but the debate over Bessarabia was discussed only in scholarship fields such as historiography and linguistics, not at a political level.

As Soviet–Romanian relations reached an all-time low in the mid-1960s, Soviet scholars published historical papers on the "Struggle of Unification of Bessarabia with the Soviet Motherland" (Artyom Lazarev) and the "Development of the Moldovan Language" (Nicolae Corlăteanu). On the other side, the Romanian Academy published some notes by Karl Marx which talk about the "injustice" of the Russian Empire's 1812 annexation of Bessarabia and in a 1965 speech, Ceaușescu quoted a letter by Friedrich Engels in which he criticized the Russian annexation, while in another 1966 speech, he denounced the pre-World War II calls by the Romanian Communist Party for the Soviet annexation of Bessarabia and Bukovina.

The issue was brought to light whenever Bucharest's relations with the Soviets were waning, but never became a serious subject of high-level negotiations in itself. On 22 June 1976, Ștefan Andrei, a member on the Permanent Bureau of the Political Executive Committee of Romania and a future Minister of Foreign Affairs, underscored that the republic harbored no territorial claims and recognized "the Moldavian Socialist Republic as an integral part of the USSR," yet that it "cannot accept the idea that Moldavians are not Romanians."

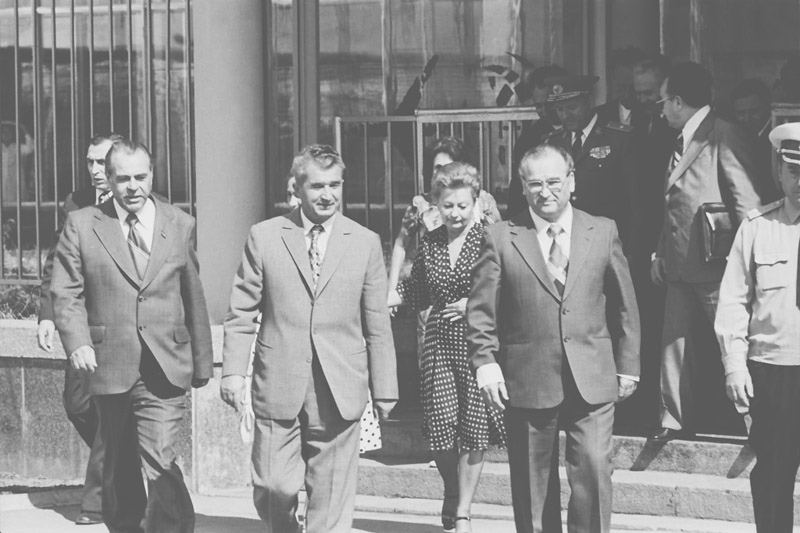
Nicolae Ceaușescu and Ivan Bodiul in Chișinău, 1976

On 1 August 1976, Nicolae Ceaușescu, Elena Ceaușescu, Nicu Ceaușescu, Ștefan Andrei, and Ambassador Gheorghe Badrus were the first high-level Romanian visitors to Moldova since World War II. On 1 August, they came from Iași, and the First Secretary of the Communist Party of Moldavia Ivan Bodiul, Kiril Iliashenko, and N. Merenișcev escorted them from the border until they left for Crimea at the Chișinău International Airport on 2 August. The move was widely interpreted as a sign of improved relations. During a meeting, Brezhnev insisted that Ceaușescu himself had the opportunity to see that the Moldavians existed as a separate people with a separate language during his 1976 visit. "Yes," Ceaușescu replied, "I did, but they spoke with me in Romanian."

In December 1976, Bodiul and his wife Claudia arrived for a return visit of five days at Ceaușescu's invitation. Bodiul's visit was a "first" in the history of postwar bilateral relations. At one of his meetings in Bucharest, Bodiul said that "the good relationship was initiated by Ceaușescu's visit to Soviet Moldavia, which led to the expansion of contacts and exchanges in all fields. A visit was paid from 14 to 16 June 1979, to the Moldavian SSR by a Romanian Communist Party delegation headed by Ion Iliescu, Political Executive Committee alternate member and Iași County Party Committee First Secretary.

As late as November 1989, as Soviet support decreased, Ceaușescu brought up the Bessarabian question once again and denounced the Soviet invasion during the 14th Congress of the Romanian Communist Party.

After the fall of communism in Romania, on 5 April 1991, its president Ion Iliescu, and Soviet President Mikhail Gorbachev signed a political treaty which among other things recognized the Soviet-Romanian border. However, the Parliament of Romania refused to ratify it. Romania and the Russian Federation eventually signed and ratified a treaty in 2003, after the independence of Moldova and Ukraine.

== Leadership ==
The Communist Party of Moldavia was a component of the Communist Party of the Soviet Union. The Communist Party was the sole legal political organization until perestroika. It had supreme power in the land, as all state and public organizations were its subordinates.

Until the 1978 Constitution of the Moldavian SSR (15 April 1978), the republic had four cities directly subordinated to the republican government: Chișinău, Bălți, Bender, and Tiraspol. By the new constitution, the following cities were added to this category: Orhei, Rîbnița, Soroca, and Ungheni. The former four cities, and 40 raions were the first-tier administrative units of the land.

== Economy ==
Although it was the most densely populated republic of the USSR, the Moldavian SSR was meant to be a rural country specialized in agriculture. Kyrgyzstan was the only Soviet Republic to hold a larger percentage of rural population. While holding just 0.2% of the Soviet territory, it accounted for 10% of the canned food production, 4.2% of its vegetables, 12.3% of its fruits and 8.2% of its wine production.At the same time, most of the Moldavian industry was built in Transnistria. While accounting for roughly 15% of the population of Moldavian SSR, Transnistria was responsible for 40% of its GDP and for 90% of electricity production.Major factories included the Rîbnița steel mill, Dubăsari and Moldavskaia power station and the factories near Tiraspol, producing refrigerators, clothing and alcohol.

== Society ==
=== Education and language ===
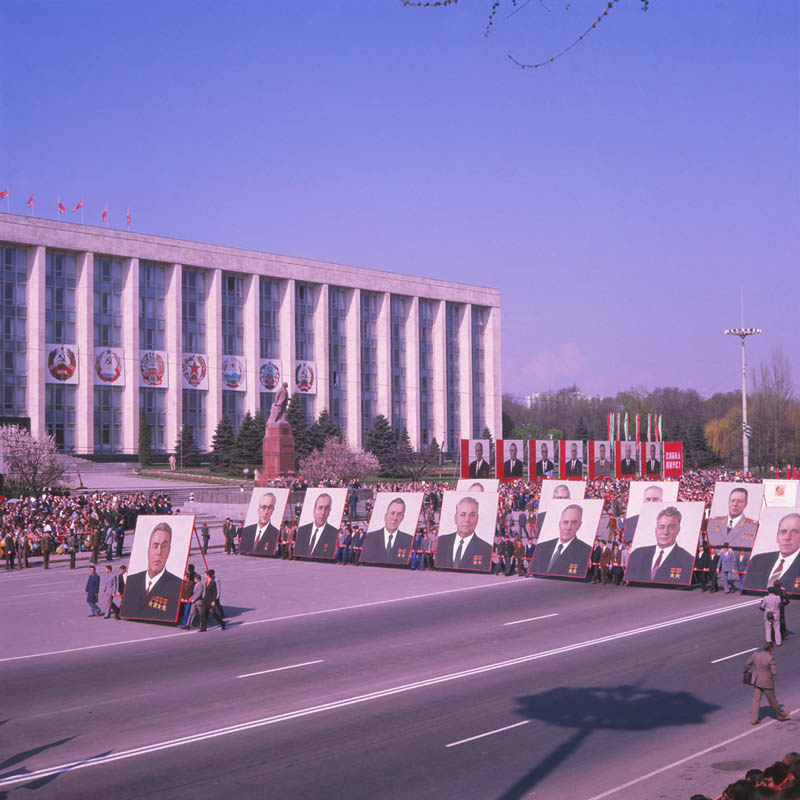
1 May parade on Victory Square, 1971

Beginning with the early 1950s, the government gradually abandoned the language standard based on the central Bessarabian speech, established as official during the Moldavian ASSR, in favour of the Romanian standard. Hence, Mihai Eminescu and Vasile Alecsandri were again allowed, and the standard written language became the same as Romanian, except that it was written with Cyrillic script.

Access to Romanian authors born outside the medieval Principality of Moldavia was restricted, as was the case with works by authors such as Eminescu, Mihail Kogălniceanu, Bogdan Petriceicu Hasdeu, Constantin Stere that promoted a Romanian national sentiment. Contacts with Romania were not severed and, after 1956, people were slowly allowed to visit or receive relatives in Romania. Romanian press became accessible, and cross-border Romanian TV and radio programmes could be easily received. Nevertheless, the Soviet–Romanian border along the Prut river, separating Bessarabia from Romania, was closed for the general public.

=== Culture ===
The little nationalism which existed in the Moldavian elite manifested itself in poems and articles in literary journals, before their authors were purged in campaigns against "anti-Soviet feelings" and "local nationalism" organized by Bodiul and Grossu.

The official stance of the Soviet government was that Moldavian culture was distinct from Romanian culture, but they had a more coherent policy than the previous one from the Moldavian ASSR. There were no more attempts in creating a Moldovan language that is different from Romanian, the literary Romanian written with the Cyrillic alphabet being accepted as the linguistic standard for Moldavia. The only difference was in some technical terms borrowed from Russian.

Moldavians were encouraged to adopt the Russian language, which was required for any leadership job (Russian was intended to be the Lingua Franca of interethnic communication in the Soviet Union). In the early years, political and academic positions were given to members of non-Moldavian ethnic groups (only 14% of the Moldavian SSR's political leaders were ethnic Moldavians in 1946), although this gradually changed as time went on.

=== Demographics ===
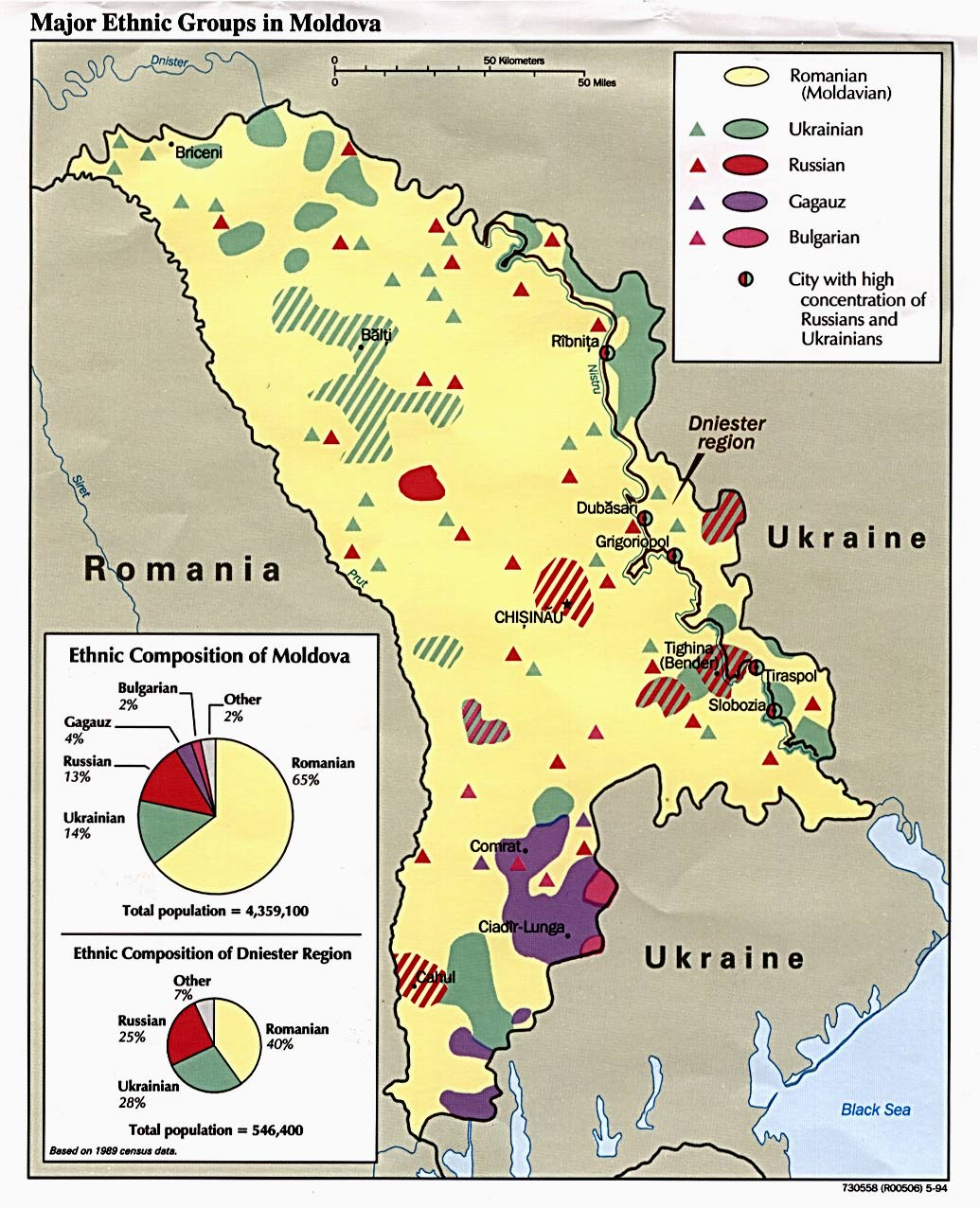
Distribution of major ethnic groups, 1989

In the aftermath of World War II, many Russians and Ukrainians, along with a smaller number of other ethnic groups, migrated from the rest of the USSR to Moldavia in order to help rebuild the heavily war-damaged economy. They were mostly factory and construction workers who settled in major urban areas, as well as military personnel stationed in the region. From a socio-economic point of view, this group was quite diverse: in addition to industrial and construction workers, as well as retired officers and soldiers of the Soviet army, it also included engineers, technicians, a handful of scientists, but mostly unqualified workers.

Access of native Bessarabians to positions in administration and economy was limited, as they were considered untrustworthy. The first local to become minister in the Moldavian SSR was only in the 1960s as minister of health. The antagonism between "natives", and "newcomers" persisted until the dissolution of the Soviet Union and was clear during the anti-Soviet and anti-Communist events from 1988 to 1992. The immigration affected mostly the cities of Bessarabia, Northern Bukovina, as well as the countryside of Budjak where the Bessarabia Germans previously were, but also the cities of Transnistria. All of these saw the proportion of ethnic Moldavians slowly drop throughout the Soviet rule.

Ethnic composition of the Moldavian SSR
Ethnic group	1941		1959		1970		1979		1989	
Moldavian	1,620,800	68.8%	1,886,566	65.4%	2,303,916	64.6%	2,525,687	63.9%	2,794,749	64.5%
Romanian			1,663	0.06%	1,581		1,657		2,477	0.06%
Ukrainian	261 200	11.1%	420,820	14.6%	506,560	14.2%	560,679	14.2%	600,366	13.8%
Russian	158,100	6.7%	292,930	10.2%	414,444	11.6%	505,730	12.8%	562,069	13.0%
Jewish			95,107	3.2%	98,072	2.7%	80,127	2.0%	65,672	1.5%
Gagauz	115,700	4.9%	95,856	3.3%	124,902	3.5%	138,000	3.5%	153,458	3.5%
Bulgarian	177,700	7.5%	61,652	2.1%	73,776	2.1%	80,665	2.0%	88,419	2.0%
Romani			7,265	0.2%	9,235	0.2%	10,666	0.3%	11,571	0.3%
Others	23,200	1.0%	22,618	0.8%	43,768	1.1%	48,202	1.2%	56,579	1.3%

== Legacy ==
The widespread nostalgia for the Soviet Union influences electoral choice in the Republic of Moldova. According to a 2017 survey conducted by the Pew Research Center, nostalgia for the USSR is common with 70% of Moldovans stating that the dissolution of the Soviet Union in 1991 was a bad thing for their country. In the region of Gagauzia, the main street of Etulia is named after Vladimir Lenin and a statue of Karl Marx is still preserved in front of the village hall.
