= Frumușica =

Frumuşica may refer to:

== Romania ==
- Frumușica, Botoșani, a commune in Botoşani County
- Frumuşica, a village in Mădârjac Commune, Iaşi County

== Moldova ==
- Frumușica, Florești, a commune in Florești District, along with its village of Frumuşica Nouă
- Frumuşica, a village in Băcioi Commune, Chişinău municipality
- Frumuşica, a village in Chioselia Mare Commune, Cahul District
- Frumuşica, a village in Călugăr Commune, Făleşti District
- Frumuşica, a village in Cazangic Commune, Leova District
