= Hiliuți =

Hiliuţi may refer to several places in Moldova:

- Hiliuţi, Făleşti, a commune in Făleşti district
- Hiliuţi, Rîşcani, a commune in Rîşcani district
