= Eugenia Crușevan =

Moldovan lawyer (1889–1976)

Eugenia Crușevan (1889, Fălești – 11 March 1976, Timișoara) was the first female lawyer in Bessarabia (1918). She began her lawyer career by signing up in the bar of lawyers in Chișinău. In the early 1950s, she moved to Timișoara. She practised law until retirement.
