= Ion Dumeniuc =

Moldovan scientist, editor and politician

Ion Dumeniuc OR
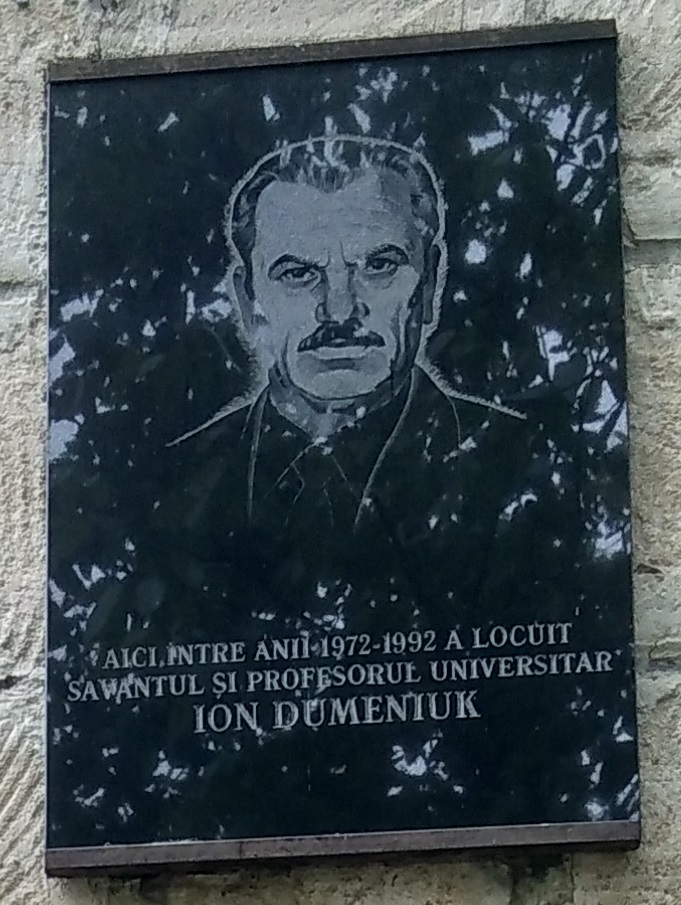
- Plaque of Dumeniuc in Chișinău
- Born: May 5, 1936; Socii Noi, Kingdom of Romania
- Died: November 3, 1992 (aged 56); Chişinău, Moldova
- Resting place: Chişinău
- Education: Moldova State University
- Occupation: editor
- Known for: editor in chief Limba Română
- Spouse: Elena Dumeniuc

Ion Dumeniuc (5 May 1936 – 3 November 1992) was a scientist, editor, and politician from the Republic of Moldova. He was the founder of the Limba Română magazine.

== Biography ==
Between September 1991 and November 3, 1992 Ion Dumeniuc served as Director General of the State Department of Languages (Romanian: Departamentul de Stat al Limbilor).; Ion Ciocanu was his successor.

Ion Dumeniuc died on November 3, 1992. The sculptor Tudor Cataraga has created a sculpture on the grave of Ion Dumeniuc at the Central Orthodox Cemetery in Chişinău.

== Honours ==
- Ion Dumeniuc Street in Chişinău

== Works ==
- "Introducere în lingvistică" (1980)
- "Lingvistica generală" (1985),
- "Norme ortografice, ortoepice şi de punctuaţie ale limbii române" (1990)
