= Băcioi =

Commune and village in Chișinău municipality

- Commune
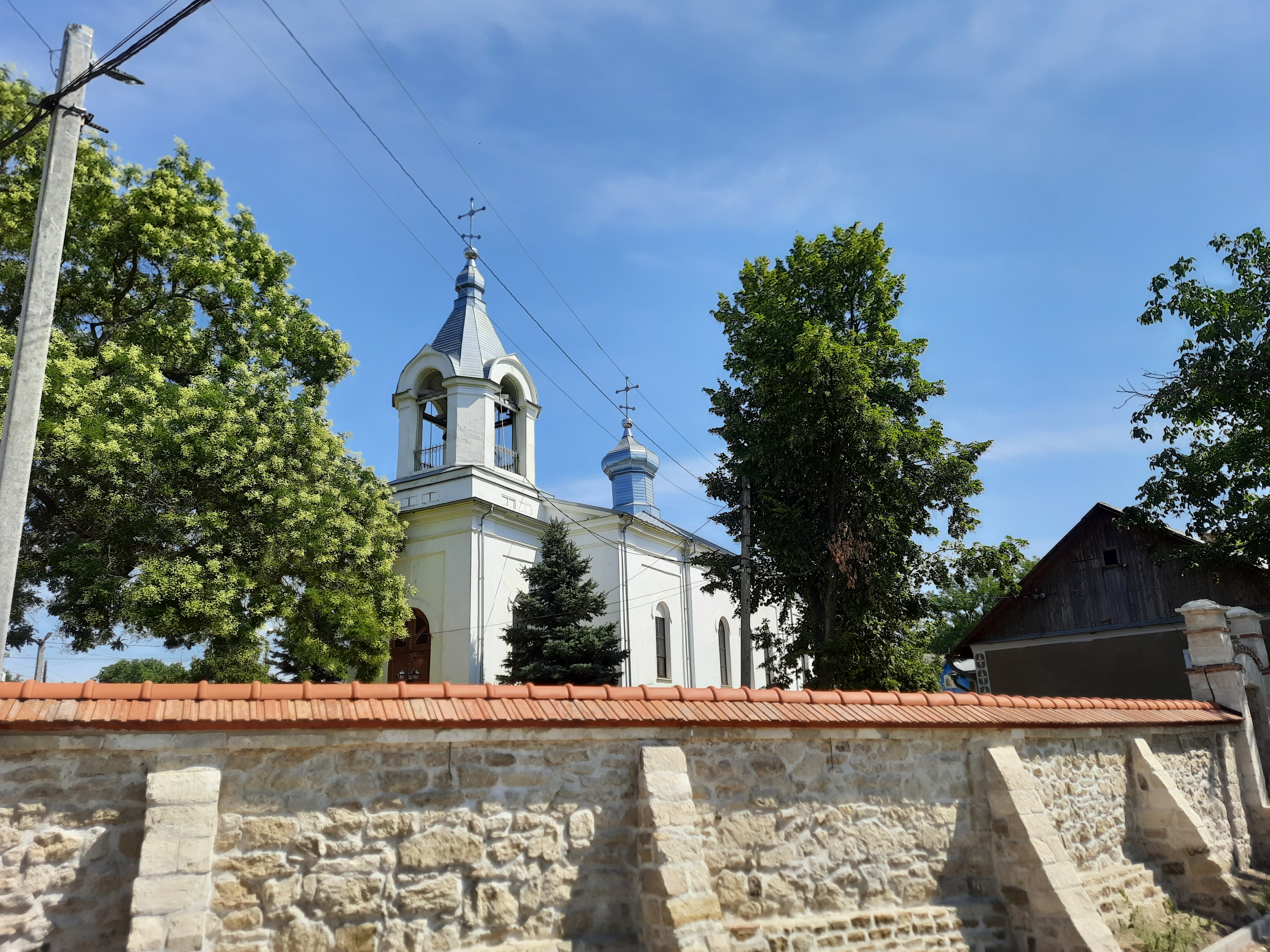
- “Holy Archangels Michael and Gabriel” Church in Băcioi

- Location within Moldova
- Coordinates: 46°54′44″N 28°53′2″E
- Country: Moldova
- Municipality: Chișinău

Government
  - Mayor: Ilie Leahu (PAS)
- Elevation: 52 m (171 ft)

Population (2024)
  - Total: 11,663
- Time zone: UTC+2 (EET)
  - Summer (DST): UTC+3 (EEST)
- Website: Official website

Băcioi (Romanian pronunciation: [bəˈt͡ʃoj]) is a commune and village in Chișinău municipality, Moldova, located south of the capital. The commune is composed of four villages: Băcioi, Brăila, Frumușica, and Străisteni.

== Demographics ==
According to the 2024 census, 11,663 inhabitants lived in the commune of Băcioi, an increase compared to the previous census in 2014, when 10,175 inhabitants were registered.

Ethnic composition of Băcioi (2024)
1. Moldovans (Note: There is an ongoing controversy regarding the ethnic identification of Moldovans and Romanians.) (90.8%)
2. Romanians (8.50%)
3. Others (0.70%)
Linguistic composition of Băcioi (2024)
1. Romanian (53.7%)
2. Moldovan (Note: In March 2023, the Parliament of Moldova passed a law updating all legislative texts and the constitution to refer to the national language as Romanian, effectively rendering the term "Moldovan" obsolete.) (44.5%)
3. Russian (1.30%)
4. Other (0.40%)

Historical population
| Year | Pop. | ±% |
|---|---|---|
| 2004 | 10,618 | — |
| 2014 | 10,175 | −4.2% |
| 2024 | 11,663 | +14.6% |

== Notable people ==
- Anastasia Lazariuc, singer, renowned for her contributions to Romanian and Moldovan pop music
