= Hiliuți, Fălești =

Hiliuți
- Commune
- Location within Moldova
- Coordinates: 47.6688888889°N 27.76°E
- Country: Moldova
- District: Fălești District

Government
  - Mayor: Sanduleac

Population (2014)
  - Total: 1,991
- Time zone: UTC+2 (EET)
  - Summer (DST): UTC+3 (EEST)

Hiliuți is a commune in Făleşti District, Moldova. It is composed of two villages, Hiliuți and Răuțelul Nou.
