= Călugăr =

- Commune
- Location in Moldova
- Coordinates: 47°32′19″N 27°41′17″E
- Country: Moldova
- District: Fălești District

Population (2014)
  - Total: 2,625
- Time zone: UTC+2 (EET)
  - Summer (DST): UTC+3 (EEST)

Călugăr is a commune in Fălești District, Moldova, about 40 km (25 mi) to the east of Iași. It is composed of four villages: Călugăr, Frumușica, Socii Noi and Socii Vechi.

== Notable people ==
- Dimitru Marchitan
- Ion Dumeniuc
