= Seliște, Nisporeni =

Seliște
- Commune
- Location in Moldova
- Coordinates: 47°05′N 28°10′E
- Country: Moldova
- District: Nisporeni District

Population (2014)
  - Total: 2,837
- Time zone: UTC+2 (EET)
  - Summer (DST): UTC+3 (EEST)

Seliște is a commune in Nisporeni District, Moldova. It is composed of two villages, Păruceni and Seliște.

== Notable people ==
- Tudor Cataraga
