= Tudor Cataraga =

Moldovan sculptor (1956–2010)

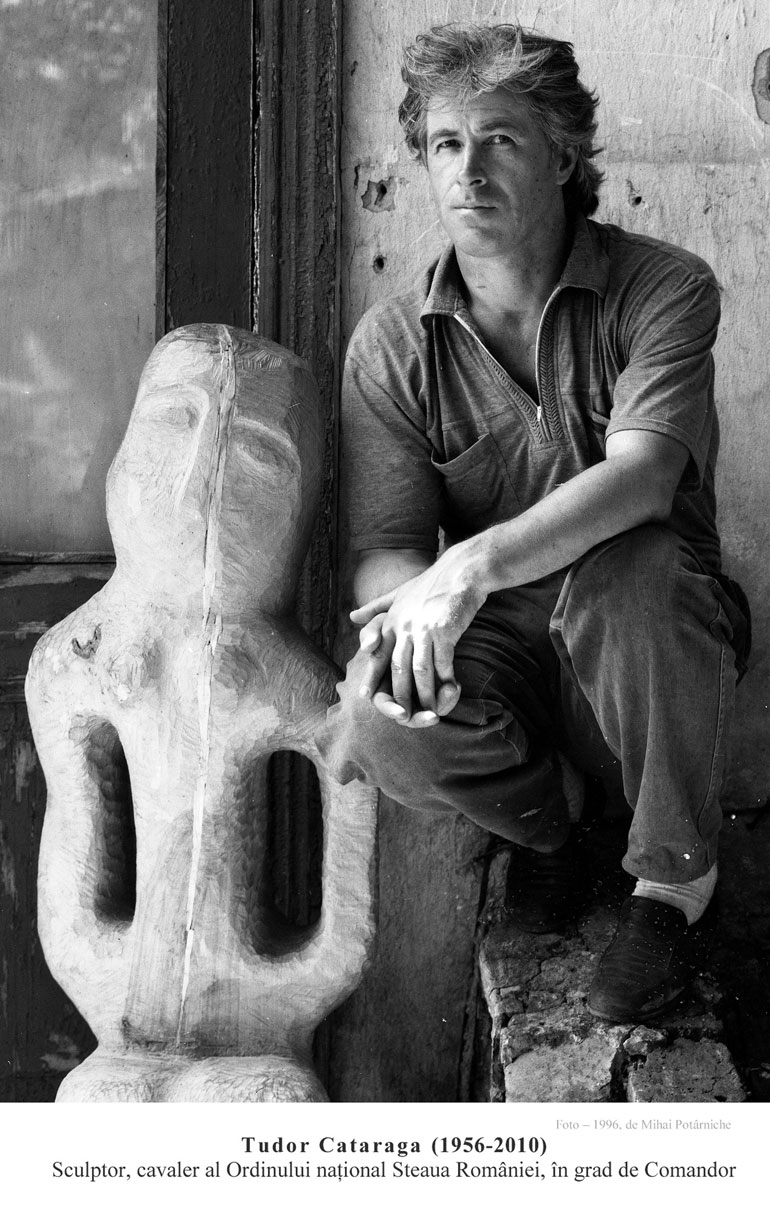
- Cataraga in 1996
- Born: 4 August 1956; Seliște, Moldavian SSR, Soviet Union
- Died: 27 December 2010 (aged 54); Moldova
- Education: Saint Petersburg Academy of Arts
- Occupation: Sculptor
- Awards: Order of the Star of Romania

Tudor Cataraga (4 August 1956 – 27 December 2010) was a sculptor from the Republic of Moldova.

== Biography ==
From 1981 to 1984, Cataraga was a student in the sculpture department at the Saint Petersburg Academy of Arts. As a graduate student at the same Institution (1989), he worked with Professor Sergey Kubasov. His professional affiliations include membership in the Union of Artists of Moldova, which he joined in 1993. Subsequently, in 1997, he became a member of the International Association of Art (IAA/AIAP), an organization functioning in official partnership with UNESCO. In 2000, he was named chair of the Sculpture Department of the Union of Artists of Moldova. In 2010, Cataraga and his wife were killed in a car accident.

== Awards ==
- 1998 – The Prize of the Union of Plastic Artists from Romania for the sculpture The Man Bird (bronze, 36x19x12 cm, 1994). Now in the public collection of the Artists Union, Romania
- 2000 – Medal "Mihai Eminescu", awarded by the President of Romania
- 2001 – Order of the Star of Romania, Commander rank
- Awarded the National prize of the Culture ministry

== About the artist ==
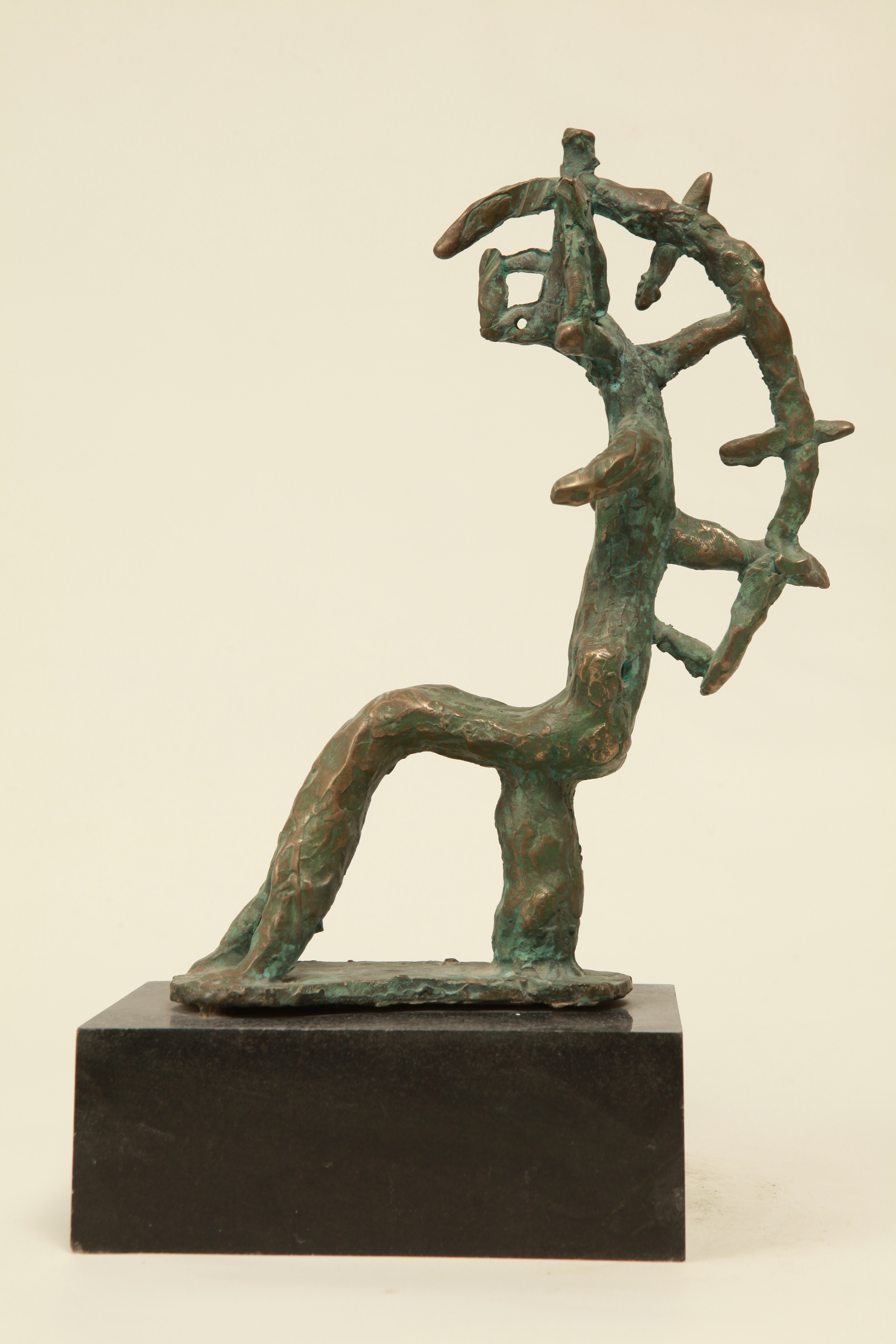
The Man Bird (bronze-granite 1994)

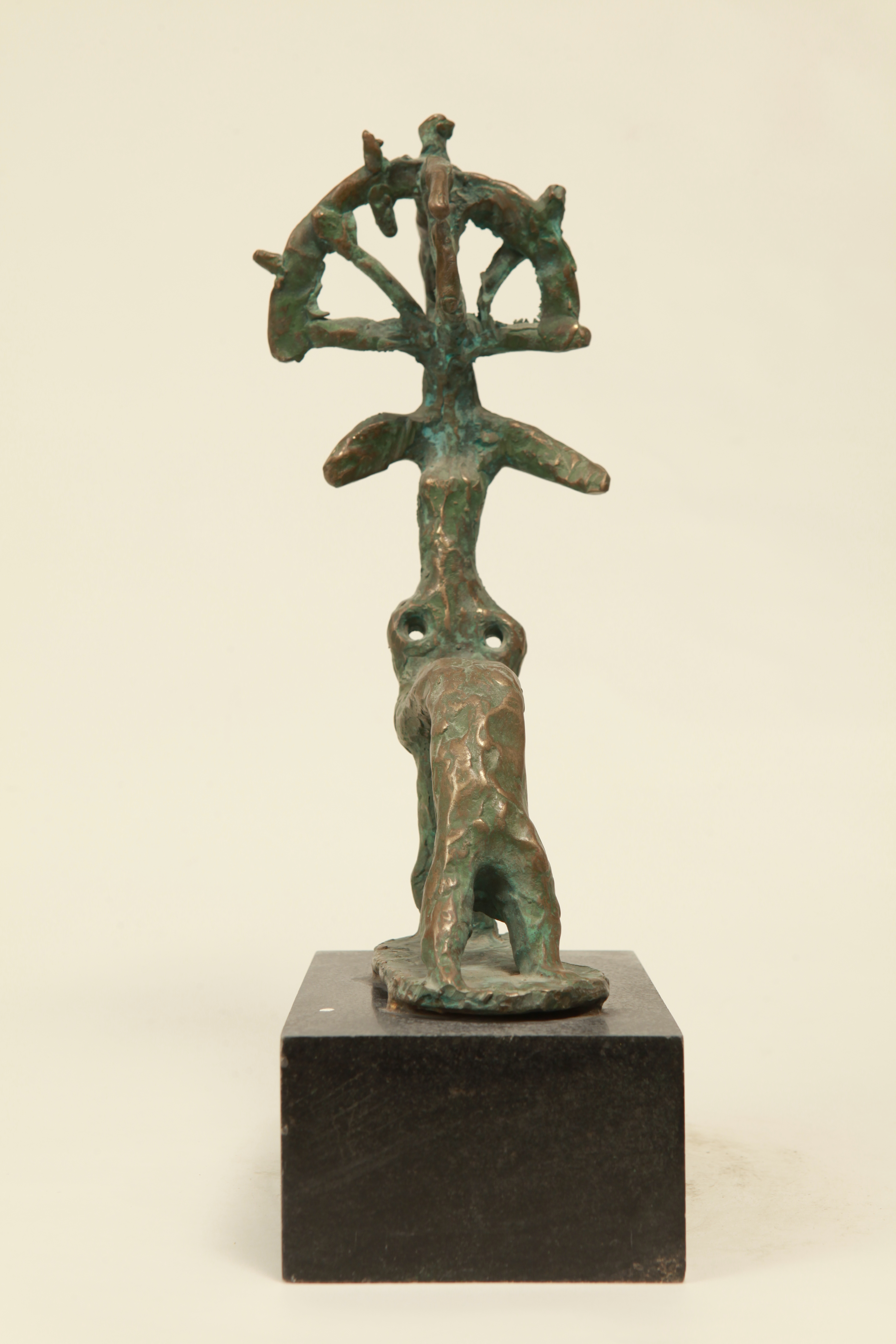
The Man Bird (bronze-granite 1994)

"...As a starting point for the understanding of the artist's repertory of shapes, I would suggest two monuments: Monument to Ion Dumeniuc, The Guarding Angel (stone, 1995, Central Orthodox Cemetery, Chișinău) and Mihai Eminescu (bronze, 1996, square of the "Mihai Eminescu" National Theatre), both of them representing visual arguments of a precise spiritual and historical identity.

The first monument is characteristic for the religious, spiritual aspect, always present in the sculptor's work. We can place the Guarding Angel project, first executed in baked clay and in a smaller form in 1990, into a larger family of works: Prayer (metal, 1991) and Sound of Sadness (baked clay, 1992). The "simplicity as a resolved complexity" Brancusi is an important key for the understanding of these works.

...for the monument to Mihai Eminescu, Tudor Cataraga selects only abstract principles, imagining a "cosmic" portrait of the national genius. Far more modern in visual expression, the sculptor is now free to play with three-dimensional elements and he conceives a rhythmical network that concentrates in the poet's figure /symbolic nucleus, without stirring the space, but comprimating. This second direction of his research, his playing with neo-expressionist forms can be seen in a series of his recent experimental works: The Woman-Crossbow (bronze, wood, 1994), The Man-Bird (bronze, granite, 1994), Motherhood (bronze, granite, 1998).

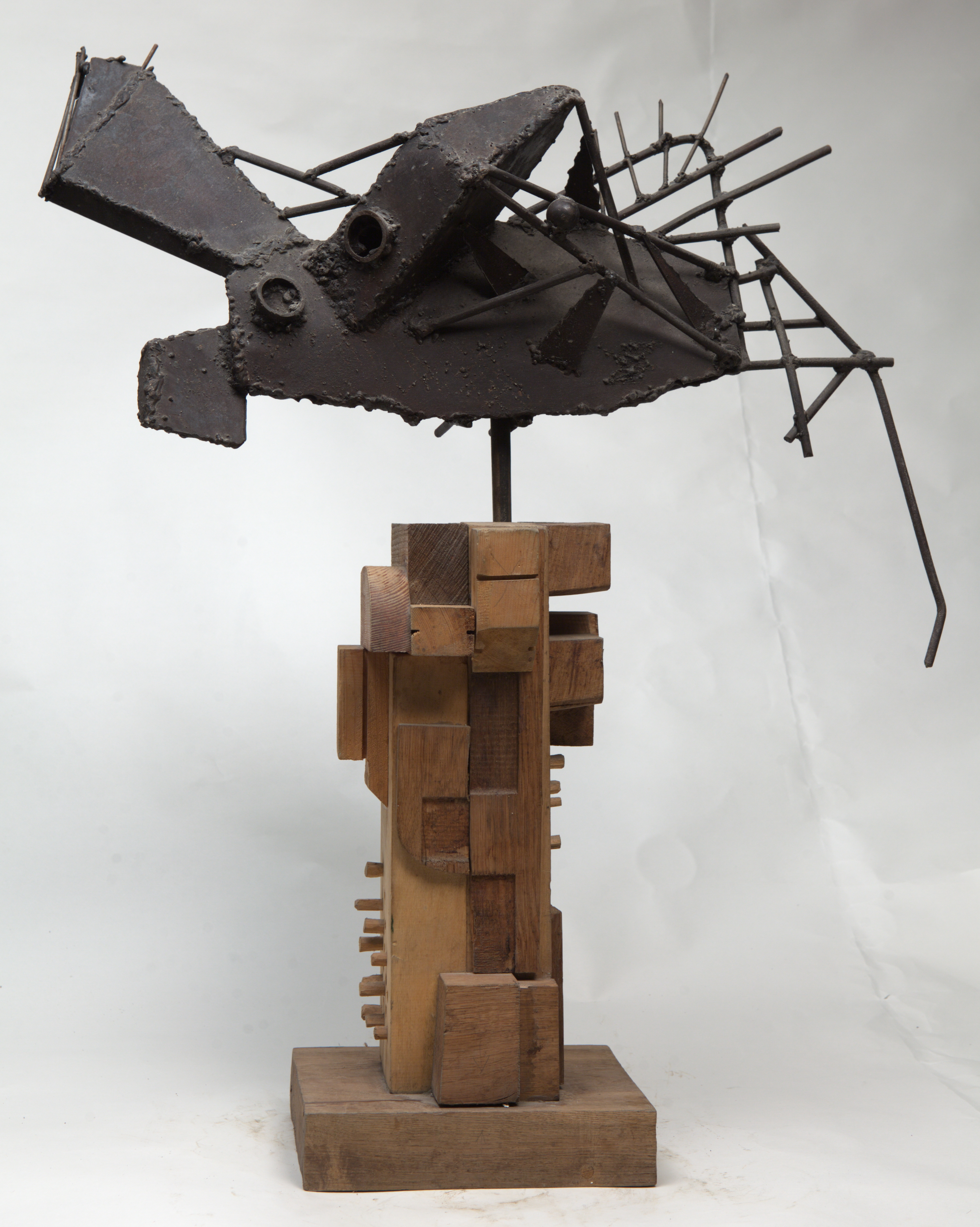
Underwater object (metal 1998)

== Monumental Works ==
- 1990 - Archeology, bronze and stone
- 1990 - Manole the Builder, chamotte
- 1994 - Guarding Angel, funeral monument dedicated to Ion Dumeniuc, stone, Chișinău, Moldova
- 1994 - Woman-Crossbow, bronze and wood
- 1995 - Levitation, bronze and wood
- 1995 - Human bird, bronze
- 1996 - Mihai Eminescu, bronze-granite, Chișinău, Moldova
- 2000 - Medieval Throne, sandstone, Ungheni, Moldova
- 2001 - Beginning and End, granite, Changchun World Sculpture Park, Changchun, Jilin province, China
- 2002 - Meeting in space, wood-stone-metal, Ungheni, Moldova
- 2002 - Rigid fluidity, funeral monument dedicated to Andrei Sârbu, Chișinău, Moldova
- 2004 - Stephen III of Moldavia, stone, Nisporeni, Moldova
- 2005 - Mihai Eminescu-bust, stone, Nisporeni, Moldova
- 2005 - Meşterul Manole, stone, Criuleni, Moldova
- 2006 - Dispersal in Time, stone, Ungheni, Moldova
- 2006 - Dolmen, granite, Chișinău, Moldova
- 2006 - Alexander I of Moldavia, bronze, Ialoveni, Moldova
- 2008 - Leonardo Da Vince, stone, Technical University of Moldova
- 2008 - Mihai Eminescu-bust, bronze, Iurceni, Moldova
- 2010 - Alert Flying, graved stone stele dedicated to writer and diplomat Aurel Dragoș Munteanu, Buda village, Moldova
- 2010 - Masa Raiului, mosaic-concrete, Sângeorz-Băi, Romania

== Sculpture Camps ==
- 1992 - Galda Moment, Alba-Iulia, Romania
- 1993 - Nine Masters, George Apostu Art Center, Bacău, Romania
- 1993 - Mold-Expo, Chișinău, Moldova
- 1997 - First International Symposium of Bronze Sculpture, Chișinău, Moldova
- 1998 - Second International Symposium of Bronze Sculpture, Chișinău, Moldova
- 2000, 2002, 2006 - Stone Sculpture Symposium, Ungheni, Moldova
- 2001 - International Sculpture Symposium, Changchun, Jilin province, China
- 2005 - Stone Sculpture Symposium, Criuleni, Moldova
- 2008 - Stone Sculpture Symposium, at Chișinău Technical University, Moldova
- 2009 - Stone Sculpture Camp, Bran, Romania
- 2010 - Sculpture Camp, Sângeorz-Băi, Romania

== Personal exhibitions ==
- 1998 - Gallery Latin America House, Bucharest, Romania
- 1999 - Vasile Pogor Memorial House, Iași, Romania
- 2000 - Parliament Hall, Bucharest, Romania
- 2003 - Center Constantin Brâncuși, Chișinău, Moldova
- 2005 - UNHCR, Chișinău, Moldova
- 2005 - Art exhibition at OSCE Mission, Chișinău, Moldova
- 2006 - National Museum of Art (MNAM), Chișinău, Moldova
- 2014 - Cu pietate, in eternitate, in memory of Tudor Cataraga, curated by Tudor Braga (art critic), at the Exhibition Center Constantin Brâncuși, Chișinău, Moldova

== Collective exhibitions ==
- 1986 - Youth's Palace, Saint Petersburg, Russia
- 1987 - Exhibition Center Saint Petersburg Manege, Russia
- 1988 - Contemporary History and Civilization, Saint Petersburg, Russia
- 1989 - Exhibition OHTA, Saint Petersburg, Russia
- 1989 - Leningrad and its inhabitants, Saint Petersburg Manege, Russia
- 1989–2001 - Moldova's Salon, Chișinău-Bacău-Bucharest
- 1990, 1994 - Spring Salon, Exhibition Center Constantin Brâncuși, Chișinău, Moldova
- 1990 - The Disciples of Art Academy of USSR Saint Petersburg, Russia
- 1991 - The Disciples of Art Academy of USS, Tbilisi, Georgia
- 1991, 2001 - Autumnala '91 Exhibition Center Constantin Brancuși, Chișinău, Moldova
- 1992 - Limba Noastră, Exhibition Center Constantin Brâncuși, Chișinău, Moldova
- 1992–1993 - Bassarabian Artists in Bucharest, Art-Expo, Bucharest, Romania
- 1995 - Painting Exhibition, Düsseldorf, Germany
- 1996 - Art Exhibition, Budapest, Hungary
- 1999 - Art Exhibition, Strasbourg, France
- 2000 - Parliament Hall Art Exhibition, Bucharest, Romania
- 2001–2010 December 1 – National Day of Romania, Chișinău, Moldova
- 2002 - Sculpture Exhibition, Constantin Brâncuși Exhibition Center, Chișinău, Moldova
- 2002 - Painting Exhibition, Leone, France
- 2003–2006 Orizont Eminescian, Constantin Brâncuși Exhibition Center, Chișinău, Moldova
- 2004 - Art Exhibition at National Museum, Chișinău, Moldova
- 2005 - Art Exhibition, Vilnius, Lithuania
- 2006 - Exhibition TsDH, Moscow/Krimskiy Val, Russia
- 2006 - Art from Republic of Moldova, Utrecht, Holland
- 2006 - Emergenţă Sala Rotonda, Iași, Romania
- 2008 - Exhibition Center Constantin Brâncuși, Chișinău, Moldova

== Public collections ==
- National Art Museum of Moldova, Chișinău, Moldova
- Romanian Literature Museum, Chișinău, Moldova
- Romanian Literature Museum, Iași, Romania
- Moldova State University, Chișinău, Moldova
- Culture Center George Apostu, Bacău, Romania
- Artists Union of Romania, Constantin Brâncuși Exhibition Hall, Bucharest, Romania
