= Limba Română (magazine) =

Magazine from the Republic of Moldova

- Editor: Alexandru Bantoș
- Founder: Ion Dumeniuc
- Founded: 1991
- Based in: Chișinău
- Language: Romanian
- Website: www.limbaromana.md

Limba Română (English: Romanian language) is a magazine from the Republic of Moldova founded in 1991 by Ion Dumeniuc.

== History ==
Alexandru Bantoș has been the editor in chief since 1992. Leo Bordeianu was a secretary-general (1991–2002). The magazine is sponsored by the Romanian Cultural Institute.
