= Mihai Eminescu, Botoșani =

Mihai Eminescu
- Commune
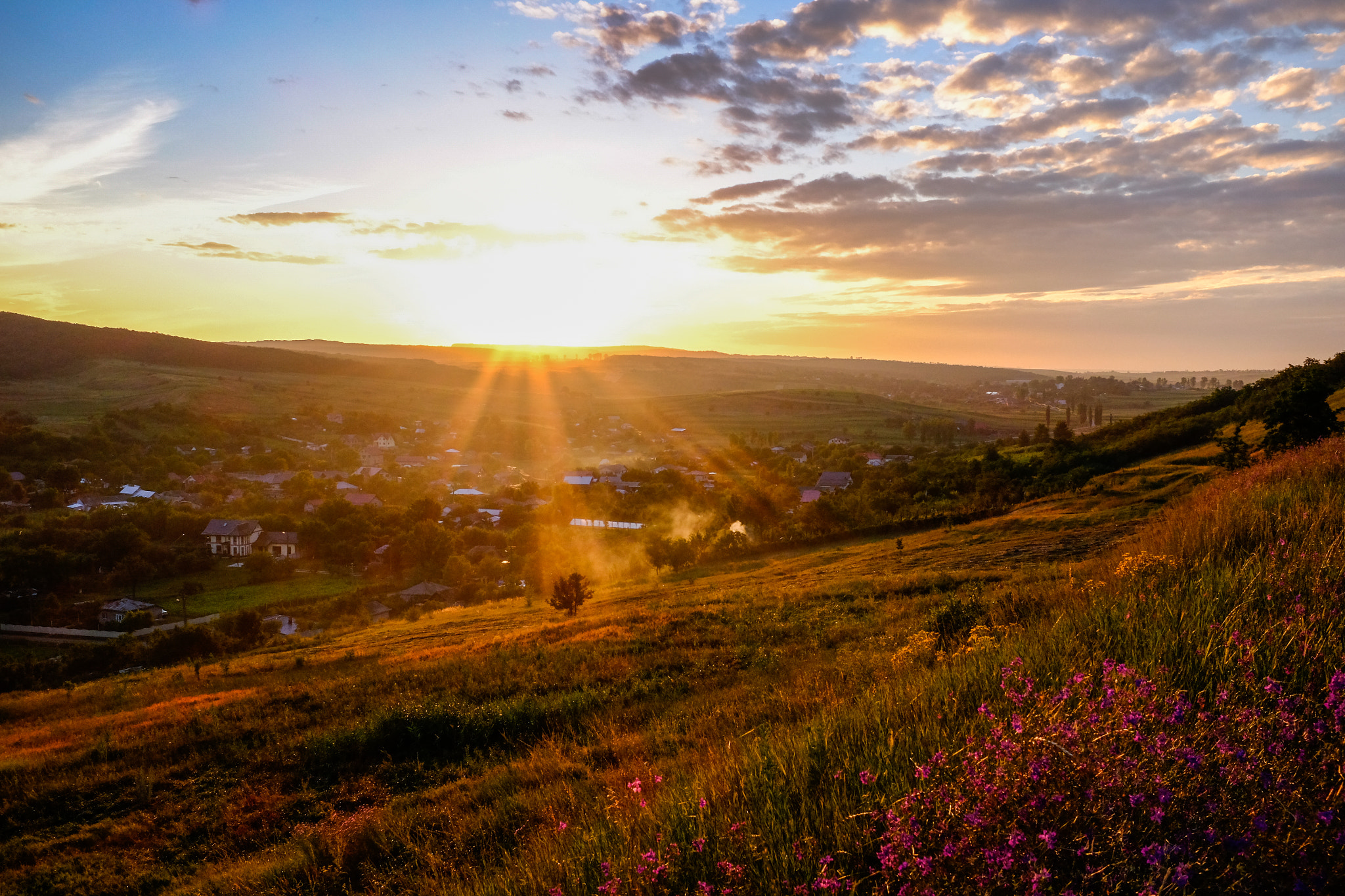

- Coat of arms

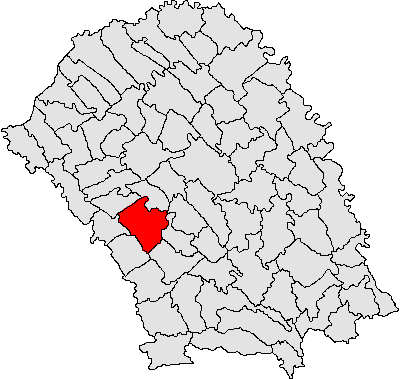
- Location in Botoșani County

- Location in Romania
- Coordinates: 47°46′N 26°33′E
- Country: Romania
- County: Botoșani
- Subdivisions: Ipotești, Baisa, Cătămărești, Cătămărești-Deal, Cervicești, Cervicești-Deal, Cucorăni, Manolești, Stâncești

Government
  - Mayor (2024–2028): Dumitru Verginel Gireadă (PSD)
- Area: 87.13 km^{2} (33.64 sq mi)
- Population (2021-12-01): 8,638
  - Density: 99.14/km^{2} (256.8/sq mi)
- Time zone: UTC+02:00 (EET)
  - Summer (DST): UTC+03:00 (EEST)
- Postal code: 717245
- Area code: +40 x31
- Vehicle reg.: BT
- Website: comunamihaieminescu.ro

Mihai Eminescu is a commune in Botoșani County, Western Moldavia, Romania. It is composed of nine villages: Baisa, Cătămărești, Cătămărești-Deal, Cervicești, Cervicești-Deal, Cucorăni, Ipotești (the commune centre), Manolești and Stâncești.

The commune is so named because Mihai Eminescu spent his childhood here, in the village of Ipotești.
