= Alexandru Bantoș =

Moldovan journalist (1950–2025)

- Born: 23 June 1950; Hiliuți, Rîșcani, Moldavian SSR, USSR (now Moldova)
- Died: 28 March 2025 (aged 74); Moldova
- Citizenship: Moldovan
- Education: Moldova State University
- Occupation: Editor; journalist; writer
- Employer: Limba Română
- Known for: Editor-in-chief of Limba Română
- Spouse: Ana Bantoș
- Awards: Order of Work Glory

Alexandru Bantoș (23 June 1950 – 28 March 2025) was a Moldovan writer and journalist, who was the editor−in−chief of Limba Română.

== Life and career ==
Alexandru Bantoș was born to Bantoș Nichita and Bantoș Agafia on 23 June 1950 in Hiliuți, Rîșcani. He was formerly the editor in chief of Limba Română, a magazine founded in 1991. He was also the director of Casei Limbii Române "Nichita Stănescu" (Nichita Stănescu House of the Romanian Language). He died in Moldova on 28 March 2025, at the age of 74.

== Awards ==
- National Order "For Merit" (Romanian: Ordinul național "Pentru Merit"), Romania, 2000.
- Order of Work Merit (Romanian: Ordinul "Gloria Muncii"), Moldova.
