= Fălești District =

Coordinates: 47°35′N 27°45′E

Fălești
- District (Raion)
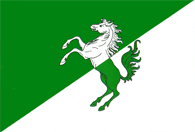
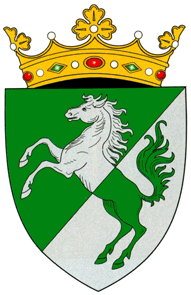
- Flag Coat of arms

- Country: Republic of Moldova
- Administrative center (Oraş-reşedinţă): Fălești
- Established: 2002

Government
  - District President: Vadim Roșca (PSDE)

Area
  - Total: 1,073 km^{2} (414 sq mi)
  - Water: 39.0 km^{2} (15.1 sq mi) 3.63%
- Elevation: 389 m (1,276 ft)

Population (2024)
  - Total: 56,039
  - Density: 52.23/km^{2} (135.3/sq mi)
- Time zone: UTC+2 (EET)
  - Summer (DST): UTC+3 (EEST)
- Area code: +373 59
- Car plates: FL
- Website: Official website

Fălești (pronunciation: [fəˈleʃtʲ]) is a district (Romanian: raion) in the north of Moldova, with its administrative center in the town of Fălești. The district borders Western Moldavia in Romania.

== History ==
District settlements with the earliest historical attestation are Fălești, Scumpia, Călugăr, and Horești, whose first documentary mentions date from the years 1429–1437. Between the fifteenth and seventeenth centuries, the area experienced economic and cultural development, driven by expanding trade and a steady increase in population.

During the 18th century, the region experienced a period of decline due to the ongoing Russo-Turkish wars, fought primarily between the Russian Empire and the Ottoman Empire, with the Danubian Principalities, including Moldavia, often caught in the crossfire. In 1812, following the Treaty of Bucharest, Bessarabia was annexed from Moldavia. Under Tsarist rule, policies of Russification encouraged the settlement of Ukrainians and Russians in the area, whose descendants today make up roughly 15% of the district’s population.

In 1918, after the collapse of the Russian Empire, Bessarabia united with Romania. In 1940, following the Molotov–Ribbentrop Pact, the region was incorporated into the Soviet Union. From 1944 to 1991, Fălești District formed part of the MSSR. After the proclamation of Moldova’s independence in 1991, it became an administrative division that later, in 1998, was reorganized into Ungheni County. In 2003, Fălești was reestablished as a separate administrative unit of the Republic of Moldova.

== Geography ==
Fălești District is located in the west-central part of Moldova and borders Glodeni District to the north, the Bălți municipality to the northeast, Sîngerei District to the east, Ungheni District to the south, and Romania to the west. The landscape is fragmented, with the southern part of the district forming several branches of the Central Moldavian Plateau. The rest of the territory is crossed by numerous rivers and features gentle slopes. The highest point in the district is the isolated hill Măgura, reaching 389 m (1,276 ft).

=== Climate ===
Climatic conditions in Fălești District are influenced by the general west-to-east movement of atmospheric air masses. The district has a temperate continental climate. Four seasons are well defined: summer, with average temperatures of 21-21.5 °C, and winter, with average temperatures of -4.5-5 °C. Annual precipitation ranges 500–600 mm, and the average wind speed is 4–6 m/s.

=== Fauna ===
The fauna of Fălești District includes hares, foxes, deer, wild boars, wolves, occasional wildcats, otters, and raccoon dogs, among others. Common bird species include storks, wild ducks, woodpeckers, tits, partridges, egrets, gulls, and others.

=== Flora ===
Forests cover 10.4% of the district and include oak, beech, hornbeam, maple, acacia, cherry, and other species. In the steppe areas, common plants include clover, fescue, bells, wormwood, knotweed, and others.

=== Rivers ===
The district lies predominantly within the Prut River basin, with the river forming its western boundary along the border with Romania, while its eastern part falls within the Răut River basin, including its tributaries, the Ciulucul Mare and Ciulucul de Mijloc. Rich in ponds and streams, the area supports diverse fish species such as carp, crucian carp, and perch.

== Administrative subdivisions ==
- Localities: 76
  - Cities: Fălești
  - Communes: 30
    - Villages: 43

== Demographics ==
According to the 2024 census, 56,039 inhabitants lived in Fălești District, a decrease compared to the previous census in 2014, when 78,258 inhabitants were registered.

Ethnic composition of Fălești District (2024)
1. Moldovans (Note: There is an ongoing controversy regarding the ethnic identification of Moldovans and Romanians.) (86.4%)
2. Romanians (4.50%)
3. Ukrainians (6.60%)
4. Russians (2.00%)
5. Others (0.40%)
Linguistic composition of Fălești District (2024)
1. Moldovan (Note: In March 2023, the Parliament of Moldova passed a law updating all legislative texts and the constitution to refer to the national language as Romanian, effectively rendering the term "Moldovan" obsolete.) (68.9%)
2. Romanian (19.2%)
3. Russian (7.60%)
4. Ukrainian (4.10%)
5. Other (0.20%)

Historical population
Year	Pop.	±%
2004	90,320	—
2014	78,258	−13.4%
2024	56,039	−28.4%

=== Religion ===
- Christian Orthodox - 95.6%
- Baptists - 1.3%
- Pentecostals - 1.0%
- Other - 1.4%
- Irreligious - 0.4%
- Not stated - 0.3%

== Economy ==
In Fălești District, there are 12,412 active traders, including 10,500 farms, 1,101 individual enterprises, 813 businesses owned by private individuals, and 622 holders of entrepreneurial patents. The main branch of the district's economy is agriculture, with production of cereals (barley, wheat, oats), vegetables, tobacco, sunflower, and permanent crops, including orchards (apple, cherry, pear) and vineyards.

== Education ==
In the district, 47 primary and secondary educational institutions are operating, including 5 elementary schools, 28 gymnasiums, and 14 lyceums. Additionally, there are 2 special schools, a vocational school, a boarding gymnasium, and 43 preschool institutions.

== Politics ==
Fălești District is located in the so-called “Red North” region, where the PCRM and other pro-Russian political movements have traditionally performed strongly. In recent years, however, the district’s political landscape has become increasingly balanced.

Summary of the 28 September 2025 parliamentary election in Fălești District
Parties and coalitions	Votes	%	+/−
Party of Action and Solidarity	9,427	30.54	-5.99
Patriotic Electoral Bloc	8,515	27.58	-4.19
Our Party	7,235	23.44	+8.29
Alternative	1,654	5.36	new
European Social Democratic Party	1,404	4.55	+0.42
Democracy at Home Party	1,401	4.54	+3.55
Other	1,236	4.00	-7.42
Total (turnout 46.38%)	31,434	100.00	

== Culture ==
The network of cultural institutions in the district includes 121 units, including 63 houses of culture, 54 libraries, a music school, two art schools, and museums.

== Health ==
The district has the Fălești Hospital, medical points in all villages, and a state pharmacy with 53 branches.

== Personalities ==
- Valentina Buliga – Politician, Minister of Labour and Social Protection of the Republic of Moldova (2009–2015)
- Eugenia Crușevan – The first female lawyer in Bessarabia
- Avraham Granot – Zionist activist, Israeli politician, and one of the 37 signatories of the Israeli Declaration of Independence
- Ilie Ilașcu – Politician, known for being sentenced to death by the separatist Transnistrian government for alleged involvement in two murders and for actions related to Moldova’s national cause
- Ion Păscăluță – Bessarabian and Romanian politician
- Maia Sandu – Politician, the 6th and current President of Moldova
- Renato Usatîi – Politician and businessman, former Mayor of Bălți, and leader of the political party Partidul Nostru (Our Party)
- Vadim Vacarciuc – Moldovan weightlifter, World Champion in 1997, and silver medalist at the 2000 European Weightlifting Championships
- Ion Văluță – Bessarabian and Romanian politician
- Gheorghe Vrabie – Plastic artist, author of the Coat of arms of the Republic of Moldova, the flag of Chișinău, and the national currency, for which he was called the “Father of the Moldovan leu”
