= Hiliuți, Rîșcani =

Hiliuți
- Village
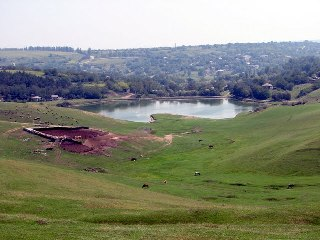

- Location in Moldova
- Coordinates: 47°55′N 27°23′E
- Country: Moldova
- District: Rîșcani District

Population (2014 census)
  - Total: 2,164
- Time zone: UTC+2 (EET)
  - Summer (DST): UTC+3 (EEST)

Hiliuți is a village in Rîșcani District, Moldova.

== Notable people ==
- Alexandru Bantoș

== Bibliography ==
- Furtună, Iacob, Satul Hiliuți, raionul Râșcani : În contextul istoriei Moldovei (Basarabiei) (1575-1998) București : Semne, 1998, ISBN 973-9318-62-2
