= Heinrich Theodor Rötscher =

German theatre critic and theorist (1803–1871)

Heinrich Theodor Rötscher (20 September 1803 – 9 April 1871) was a German theatre critic and theorist. One strong influence on his writing was Hegel.

== Biography ==
Rötscher was born in Mittenwalde, and studied philology and philosophy at the University of Berlin. From 1828 he was a gymnasium teacher in Bromberg (modern-day Bydgoszcz, Poland). In 1842 he moved back to Berlin and dedicated himself to writing and theorizing about theatre. In Berlin, he was the dramatic critic for the Spenersche Zeitung.

== Selected works ==
- Aristophanes und sein Zeitalter, an attempt to understand the ancient Greek comedian Aristophanes in light of Hegel's philosophy (1827)
- Abhandlungen zur Philosophie der Kunst, also strongly tinged with Hegelianism (1837–47)
- Die Kunst der dramatischen Darstellung, his principal work: an attempt to treat theatre criticism in a scientific manner (1841–46; 2nd ed. 1864)
- Das Schauspielwesen (1843)
- Über Byrons Manfred (1844)
- Seydelmanns Leben und Wirken (1845)
- Shakespeare in seinen höchsten Charaktergebilden (1864)
- Dramaturgische und ästhetische Abhandlungen (1864, 1867)
- Dramaturgische Blätter (1865)
- Entwickelung dramatischer Charaktere aus Lessings, Schillers und Goethes Werken (1869)
