= Fălești =

- City
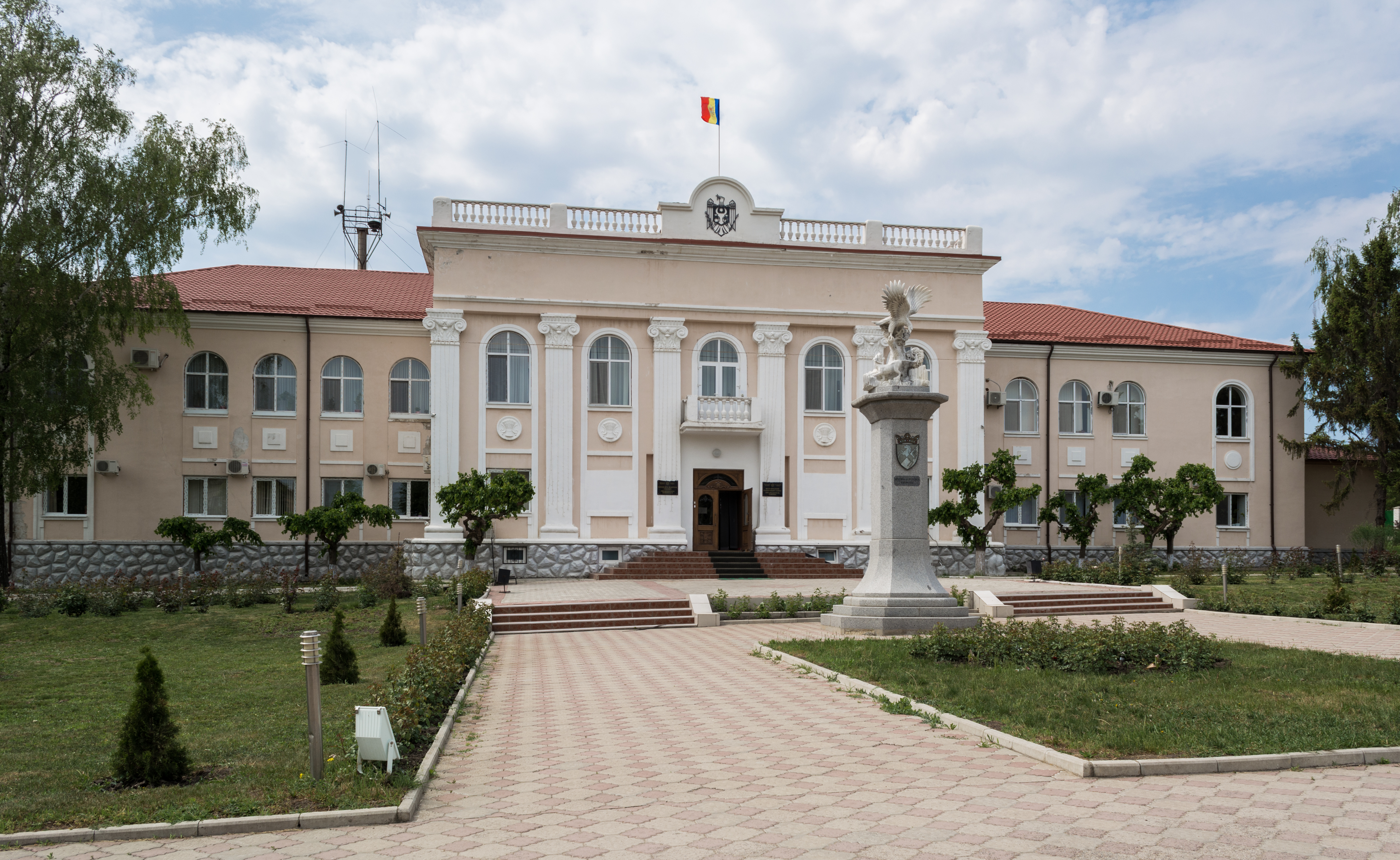
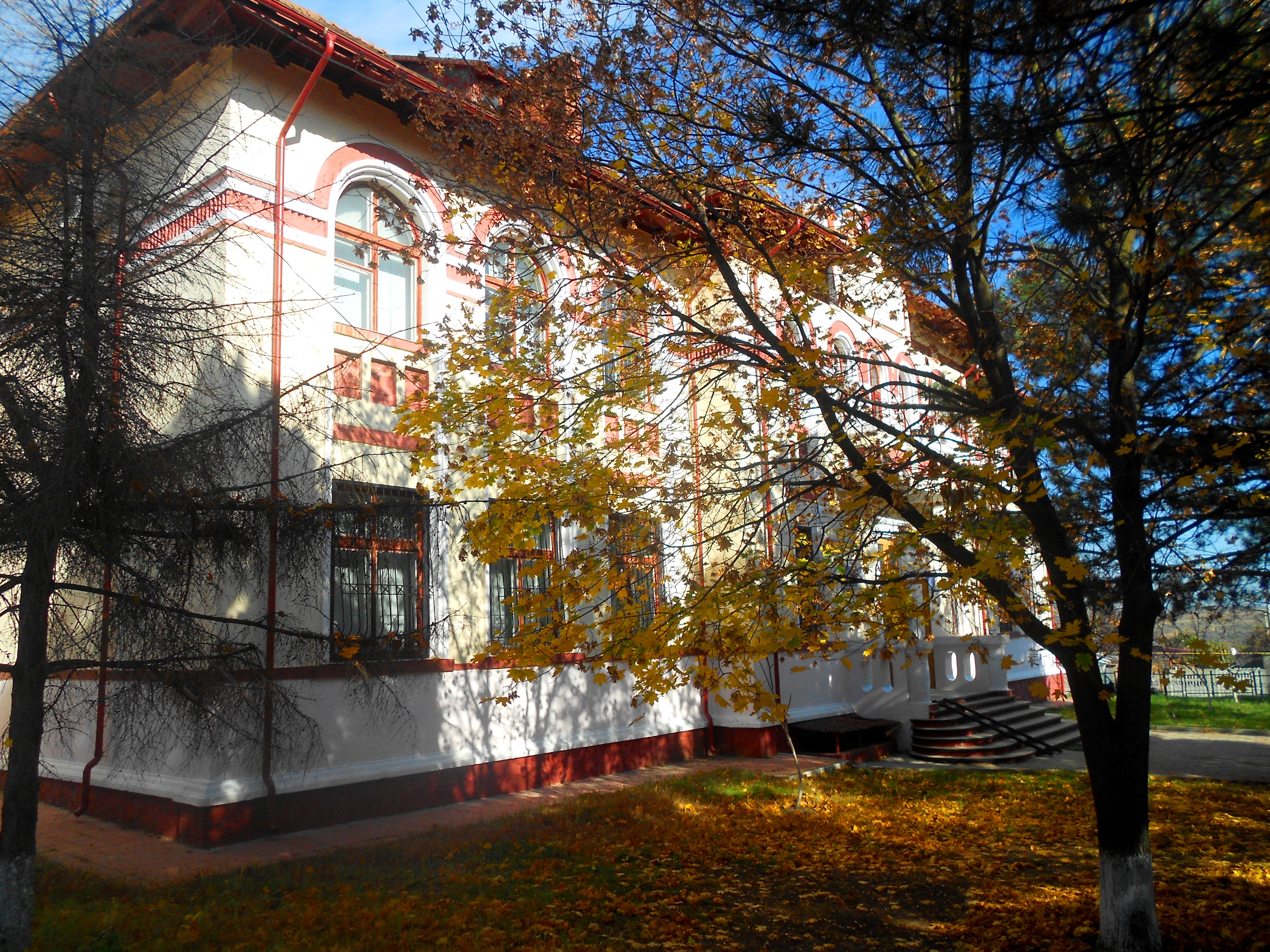
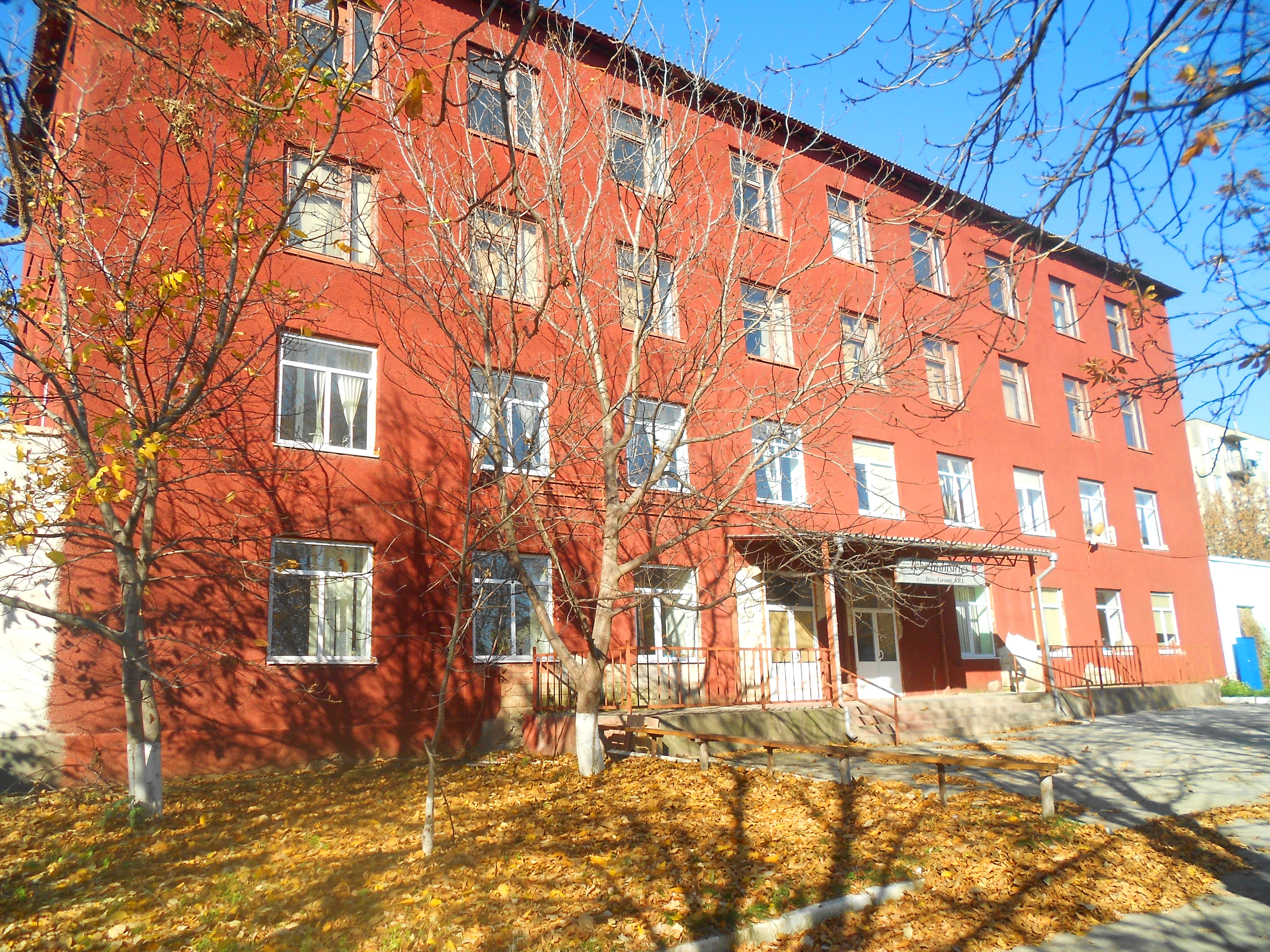
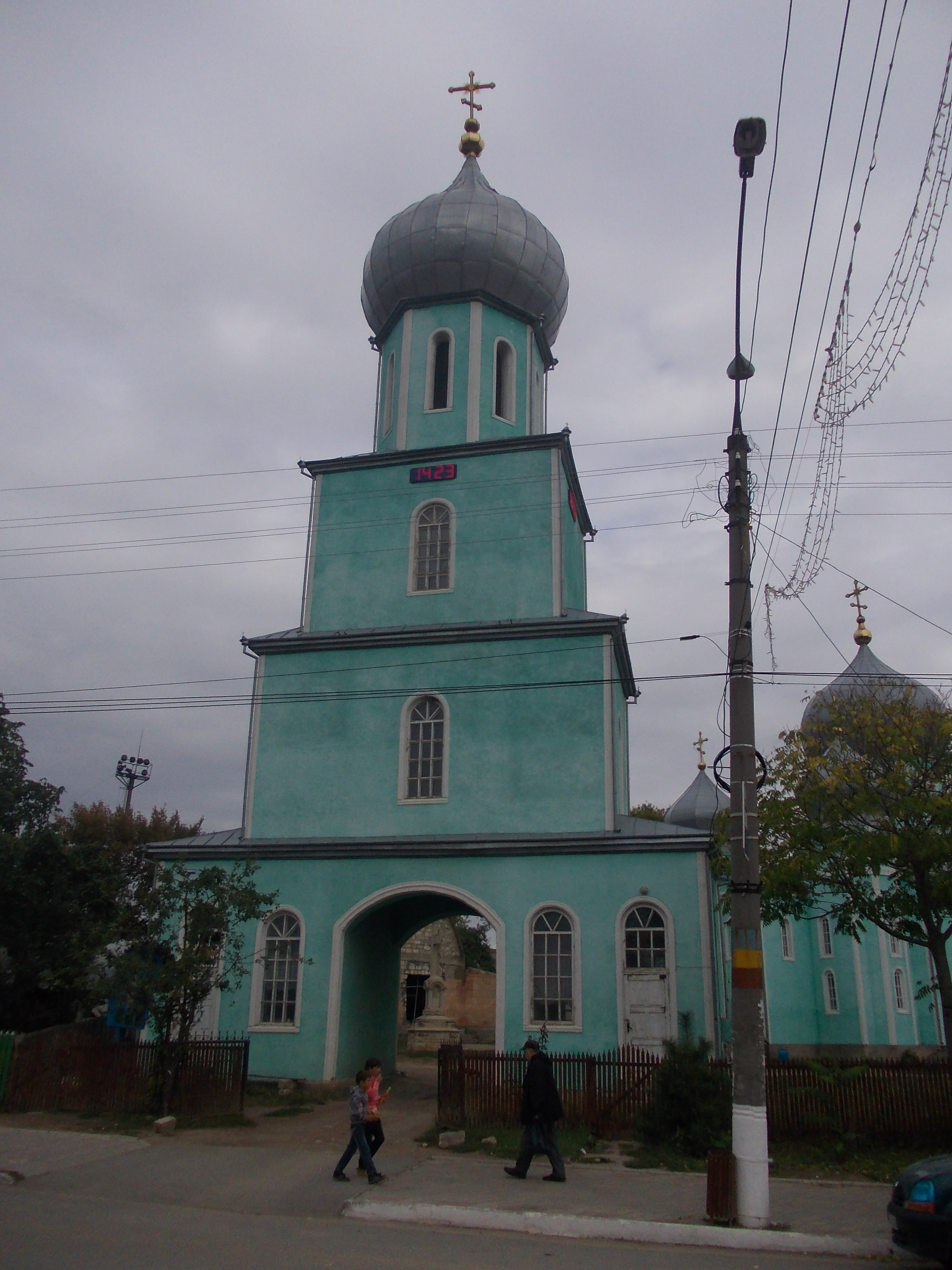
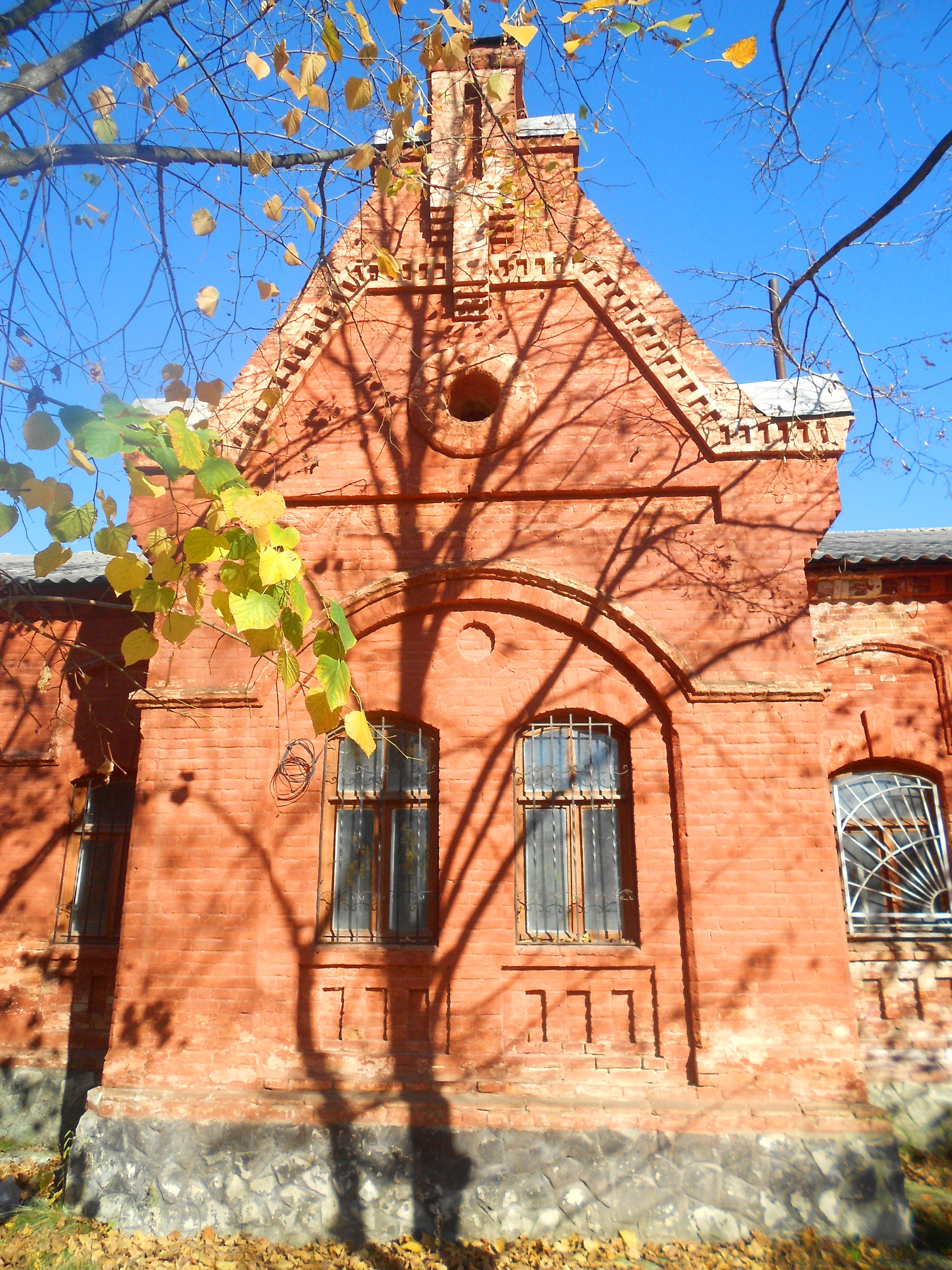
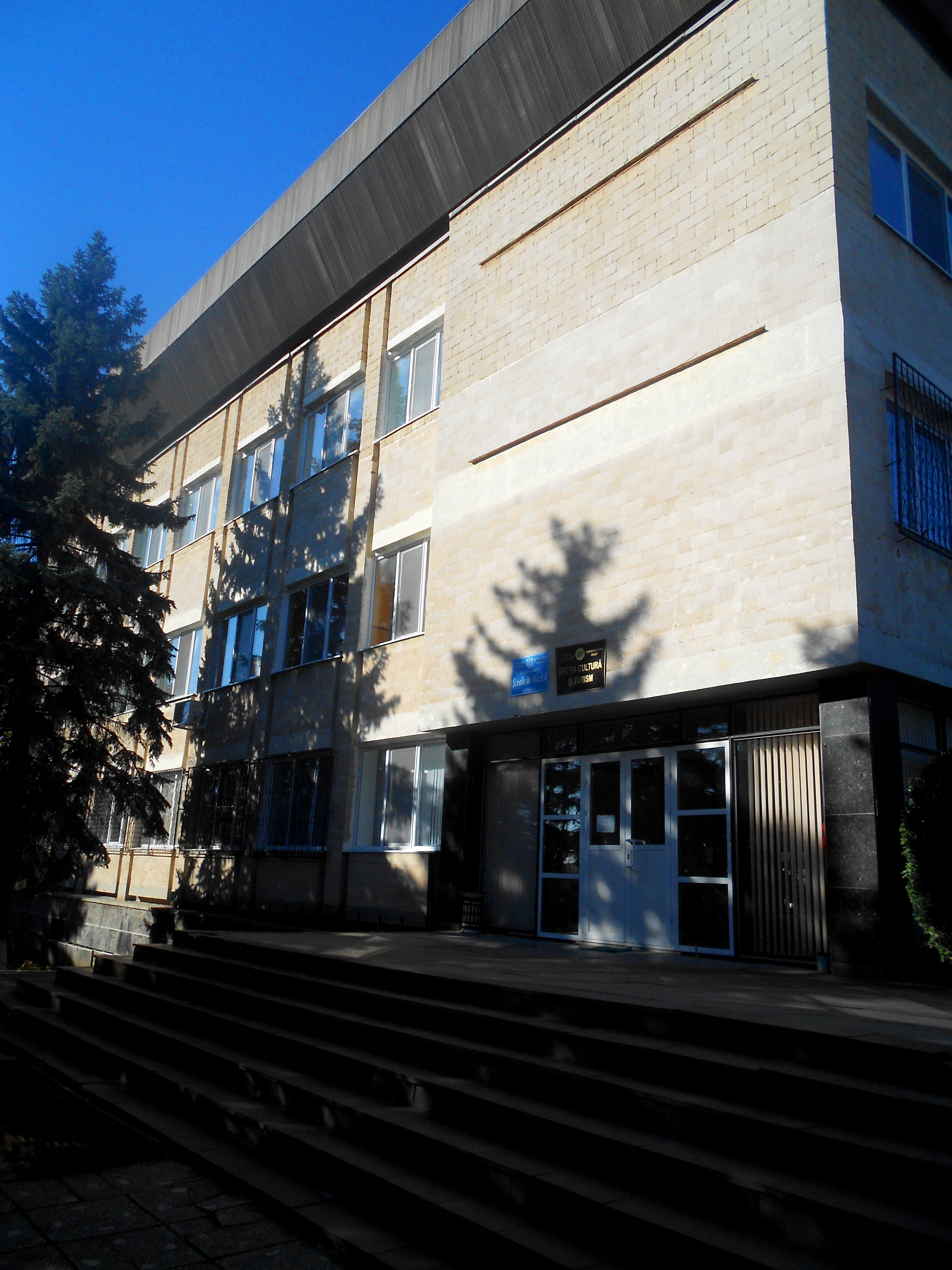

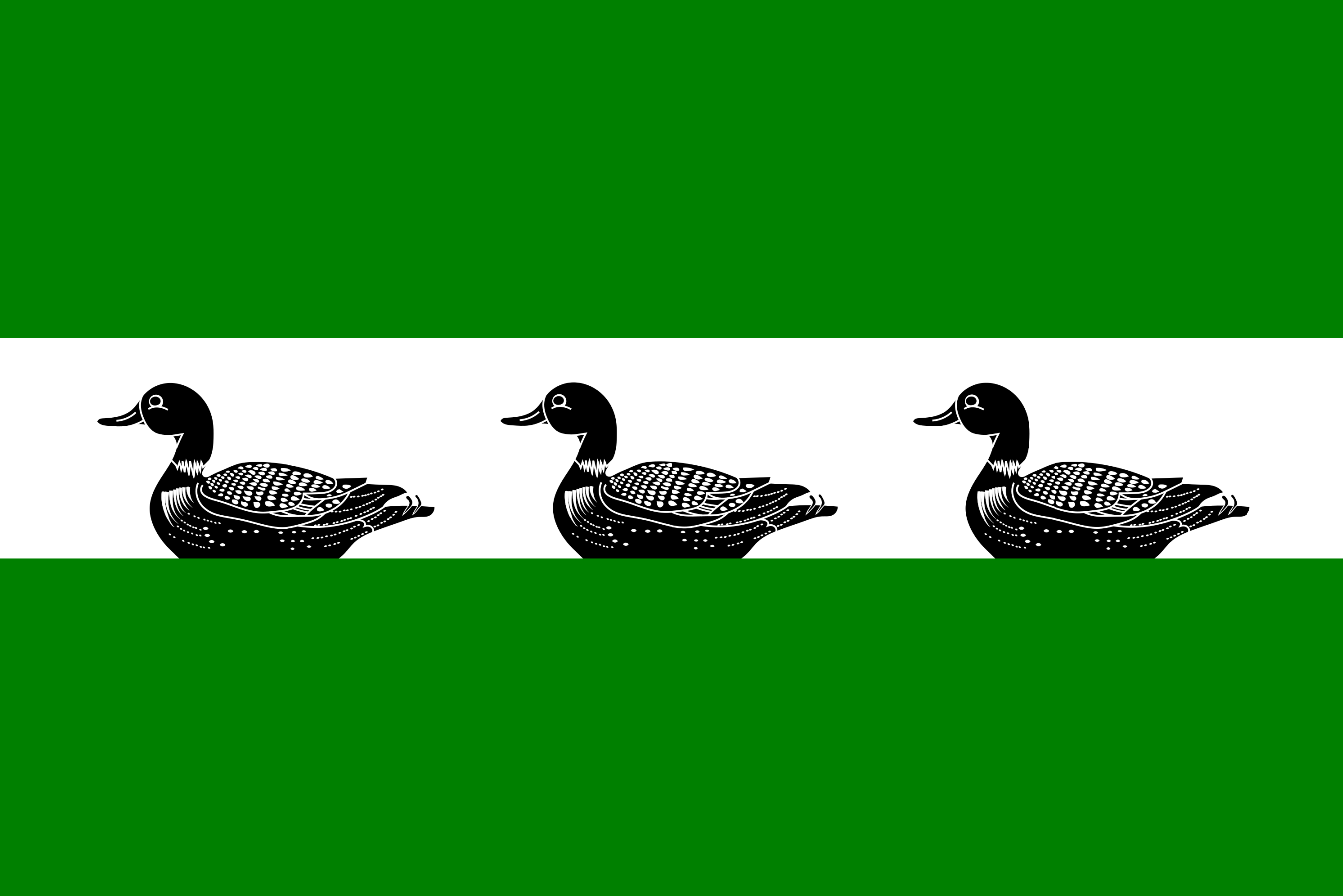
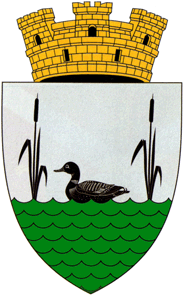
- Flag Coat of arms

- Location in Moldova
- Coordinates: 47°34′20″N 27°42′50″E
- Country: Moldova
- District: Fălești District

Government
  - Mayor: Alexandr Severin (PN)

Area
  - Total: 7.9 sq mi (20.5 km^{2})

Population (2014)
  - Total: 12,074
  - Density: 1,530/sq mi (589/km^{2})
- Time zone: UTC+2 (EET)
  - Summer (DST): UTC+3 (EEST)
- Climate: Dfb

Fălești (Romanian pronunciation: [fəˈleʃtʲ]) is a city in Moldova. It is located in the north-western part of the country, in the old Bessarabia region. It is the largest city and administrative center of Fălești District. Spread across an area of 7.9 km^{2} (3.1 sq mi), the town had a population of 12,074 inhabitants in 2014.

== Geography ==
Fălești is located in Fălești District of Moldova. It is located in the southeastern Europe and in the north-western part of Moldova. Spread across an area of 7.9 km^{2} (3.1 sq mi), it is one of 33 sub-divisions (city of Falesti and 32 communes) in the district. It is part of the Bessarabia region.

== Demographics ==
According to the 2024 census, 11,946 inhabitants lived in Fălești, a decrease compared to the previous census in 2014, when 12,074 inhabitants were registered.

Ethnic composition of Fălești (2024)
1. Moldovans (Note: There is an ongoing controversy regarding the ethnic identification of Moldovans and Romanians.) (83.4%)
2. Romanians (5.30%)
3. Ukrainians (7.00%)
4. Russians (3.20%)
5. Others (0.90%)
Linguistic composition of Fălești (2024)
1. Moldovan (Note: In March 2023, the Parliament of Moldova passed a law updating all legislative texts and the constitution to refer to the national language as Romanian, effectively rendering the term "Moldovan" obsolete.) (57.6%)
2. Romanian (25.4%)
3. Russian (13.4%)
4. Ukrainian (3.30%)
5. Other (0.30%)

Historical population
Year	Pop.	±%
1930	6,278	—
1959	7,964	+26.9%
1970	9,251	+16.2%
1979	10,715	+15.8%
1989	14,043	+31.1%
2004	14,931	+6.3%
2014	12,074	−19.1%
2024	11,946	−1.1%

Prior to the Second World War, Fălești had a substantial Jewish population, comprising almost half of the town’s inhabitants. The community was largely destroyed during the Holocaust, and many of the survivors subsequently emigrated.

== Climate ==
On 7 August 2012, Fălești recorded a temperature of 42.4 °C (108.3 °F), which is the highest temperature to have ever been recorded in Moldova.

Climate data for Fălești (1991–2020, extremes 1957–2021)
Month	Jan	Feb	Mar	Apr	May	Jun	Jul	Aug	Sep	Oct	Nov	Dec	Year
Record high °C (°F)	15.1 (59.2)	22.0 (71.6)	26.4 (79.5)	32.5 (90.5)	35.0 (95.0)	40.1 (104.2)	40.4 (104.7)	42.4 (108.3)	38.6 (101.5)	32.7 (90.9)	26.3 (79.3)	17.2 (63.0)	42.4 (108.3)
Mean daily maximum °C (°F)	1.0 (33.8)	3.4 (38.1)	9.6 (49.3)	17.1 (62.8)	23.0 (73.4)	26.6 (79.9)	28.7 (83.7)	28.6 (83.5)	22.6 (72.7)	15.6 (60.1)	8.2 (46.8)	2.4 (36.3)	15.6 (60.1)
Daily mean °C (°F)	−2.1 (28.2)	−0.3 (31.5)	4.5 (40.1)	11.3 (52.3)	16.8 (62.2)	20.5 (68.9)	22.4 (72.3)	22.2 (72.0)	16.7 (62.1)	10.6 (51.1)	4.7 (40.5)	−0.6 (30.9)	10.5 (50.9)
Mean daily minimum °C (°F)	−4.7 (23.5)	−3.3 (26.1)	0.5 (32.9)	6.3 (43.3)	11.4 (52.5)	15.2 (59.4)	17.0 (62.6)	16.6 (61.9)	11.9 (53.4)	6.7 (44.1)	2.0 (35.6)	−2.8 (27.0)	6.4 (43.5)
Record low °C (°F)	−27.5 (−17.5)	−23.2 (−9.8)	−19.0 (−2.2)	−9.8 (14.4)	−0.4 (31.3)	3.1 (37.6)	8.6 (47.5)	5.6 (42.1)	−1.8 (28.8)	−5.7 (21.7)	−15.9 (3.4)	−26.3 (−15.3)	−27.5 (−17.5)
Average precipitation mm (inches)	30 (1.2)	28 (1.1)	34 (1.3)	40 (1.6)	58 (2.3)	75 (3.0)	78 (3.1)	54 (2.1)	57 (2.2)	42 (1.7)	38 (1.5)	32 (1.3)	566 (22.3)
Average precipitation days (≥ 1.0 mm)	6	6	6	7	8	8	8	6	6	6	5	6	79
Average relative humidity (%)	84	81	74	65	63	66	66	64	68	73	83	85	73
Source 1: NOAA
Source 2: Serviciul Hidrometeorologic de Stat (extremes, relative humidity)
