= Frumușica, Florești =

Frumușica
- Commune
- Location within Moldova
- Coordinates: 47.9588888889°N 28.1183333333°E
- Country: Moldova
- District: Florești District

Population (2014)
  - Total: 1,556
- Time zone: UTC+2 (EET)
  - Summer (DST): UTC+3 (EEST)

Frumușica is a commune in Floreşti District, Moldova. It is composed of two villages, Frumușica and Frumușica Nouă (depopulated as of 2014).
