= Kirill Ilyashenko =

Soviet politician

- Chiril Iliașenco; Кирилл Ильяшенко

Chairman of the Presidium of the Supreme Soviet of the Moldavian SSR
- In office 3 April 1963 – 10 April 1980
- Premier: Alexandru Diordiță; Petru Pascari; Semion Grossu
- Preceded by: Ion Codiță
- Succeeded by: Ivan Calin

Candidate Member of the 24th Central Committee of the Communist Party of the Soviet Union
- In office 1971–1976

Member of the Supreme Soviet of the Soviet Union
- In office 1966–1974

Personal details
- Born: Kirill Fyodorovich Ilyashenko; 14 May 1915 Lypetske, Kherson Governorate, Russian Empire (now Ukraine)
- Died: 21 April 1980 (aged 64) Chișinău, Moldavian SSR, Soviet Union (now Moldova)
- Citizenship: Soviet Union; Russian Empire (previously)
- Party: CPSU (from 1945)
- Education: Shevchenko Transnistria State University (1939)
- Occupation: Politician
- Awards: Order of Lenin Order of the October Revolution Order of the Red Banner of Labour Order of the Badge of Honour

Military service
- Allegiance: Soviet Union
- Branch/service: Soviet Army
- Years of service: 1940–1945
- Rank: Sergeant Major
- Battles/wars: Great Patriotic War

Kirill Fyodorovich Ilyashenko (Romanian: Chiril Iliașenco; Russian: Кири́лл Фёдорович Ильяше́нко; 27 May [O.S. 14 May] 1915 – 21 April 1980) was a Moldavian politician who served as the Chairman of the Presidium of the Supreme Soviet of the Moldavian SSR from 1963 to 1980. He served the longest as Chairman of the Presidium, serving a total of 17 years.

== Early life and education ==
Kirill Ilyashenko was born to a peasant family in Lypetske (Romanian: Lipețchi), Kherson Governorate, Russian Empire. He graduated from the Shevchenko Transnistria State University in 1939.

== Political and military career ==
After graduating in 1939, Ilyashenko served in the Soviet Army from February 1940 to 1945. During his time in the military, he fought with the 3rd Ukrainian front and North Caucasian front in the Great Patriotic War.

Ilyashenko joined the Communist Party of the Soviet Union in 1945. He then worked as an instructor and as a head of the sector of the Central Committee of the Communist Party of Moldavia from 1946 to 1948. He was the Deputy Head of the Department of Propaganda and Agitation of the Communist Party of Moldavia from 1948 to 1951. He served as heads of various departments from 1951 to 1966. From 1962 to 1963, he served as the Chairman of the State Committee of the Council of Ministers of the Moldavian SSR and served as Deputy Chairman of the Council of Ministers of the Moldavian SSR from March 1963. From 3 April 1963 to 10 April 1980, Ilyashenko served as the Chairman of the Presidium of the Supreme Soviet of the Moldavian SSR. He simultaneously served as Deputy Chairman of the Supreme Soviet of the Moldavian SSR from 1966. Ilyashenko was elected as a member of the Central Auditing Commission of the Communist Party of the Soviet Union at the 23rd Congress of the Communist Party of the Soviet Union. At the 24th Congress of the Communist Party of the Soviet Union, he was elected as a candidate member of the Central Committee of the Communist Party of the Soviet Union. He was also a member of the Supreme Soviet of the Soviet Union for the 7th and 8th convocations.

== Death ==
Ilyashko died on 21 April 1980 at the age of 64 in Chișinău, Moldavian SSR, Soviet Union. He is buried at the Chișinău Central Cemetery also known as the Armenian Cemetery.

== Awards ==
- Order of Lenin (twice)
- Order of the October Revolution
- Order of the Red Banner of Labour (twice)
- Order of the Badge of Honour
- Medal "For Battle Merit"
- Medal "For the Defence of the Caucasus"

== See also ==
- Supreme Soviet of the Moldavian Soviet Socialist Republic
- Central Committee of the 24th Congress of the Communist Party of the Soviet Union
- Supreme Soviet of the Soviet Union
