= Alexei Barbăneagră =

Moldovan politician (born 1945)

Alexei Barbăneagră OR

Defense and National Security Advisor to the President – Secretary of the Supreme Security Council
- In office 11 April 2012 – 23 December 2016
- President: Nicolae Timofti
- Preceded by: Iurie Richicinschi
- Succeeded by: Artur Gumeniuc

1st Minister of Justice
- In office 6 June 1990 – 5 April 1994
- President: Mircea Snegur
- Prime Minister: Mircea Druc; Valeriu Muravschi; Andrei Sangheli
- Succeeded by: Vasile Sturza

Personal details
- Born: 3 December 1945 (age 80) Handrabury, Ukrainian SSR, Soviet Union (now Ukraine)
- Party: Popular Front of Moldova
- Education: Moldova State University
- Profession: Jurist

Alexei Barbăneagră (born 3 December 1945) is a lawyer from the Republic of Moldova, who served as Minister of Justice from 6 June 1990 to 5 April 1994 in Mircea Druc Cabinet.
