= Nicolae Mătcaș =

Moldovan politician (born 1940)

Nicolae Mătcaş OR

1st Minister of Science and Education
- In office 6 June 1990 – 5 April 1994
- President: Mircea Snegur
- Prime Minister: Mircea Druc; Valeriu Muravschi; Andrei Sangheli
- Succeeded by: Petru Gaugaș

Personal details
- Born: 27 April 1940 (age 85) Crihana Veche, Kingdom of Romania
- Party: Popular Front of Moldova

Nicolae Mătcaş (born 27 April 1940) is a Moldovan politician. He was the Minister of Education in the Mircea Druc Cabinet.

== Biography ==
Nicolae Mătcaş was born on 27 April 1940 in Crihana Veche, Cahul, Kingdom of Romania (the region alternated between Romanian and Soviet rule, but became part of modern-day Moldova in 1991). He served as Minister of Education in Mircea Druc Cabinet (1990–1994). After 1995 Nicolae Mătcaş worked for the Ministry of Education, Research, Youth and Sport (Romania) in Bucharest.

== Works ==
- "Surâsul Giocondei". Ed. Didactică şi Pedagogică, București, 1997.
- "Trenul cu un singur pasager". Ed. Didactică şi Pedagogică, București, 1998.
- "Azur". Ed. "Augusta", Timişoara, 2002.
- "Câte-s visele, multele…". Ed. "Pro Transilvania", București, 2003.
- "Coloana infinitului". Ed. "Pro Transilvania"; București, 2003.
- "De-a alba – neagra". Ed. Muzeul Literaturii Române, București, 2006.
- "Roată de olar. Sonete". Ed. "Pro Transilvania", București, 2008.
- "Vernale ploi". Ed. "Pro Transilvania", București, 2008.

== Bibliography ==
- Nicolae Mătcaş (la 60 de ani). În : " Calendar naţional 2000 ", Chişinău, 2000, pp. 127–130.
- Nicolae Mătcaş. În : "Enciclopedia marilor personalităţi. Din istoria, ştiinţa şi cultura românească de-a lungul timpului şi de pretutindeni. Vol. V. Contemporanii, K–Z.". Ed. "Geneze", Fundaţia Realitatea Românească, București, 2003, pp. 76–79.
- Tudor Opriş. "Inimi de peste Prut". În cartea : Tudor Opriş. Chipuri în bronz. Evocări, II. Ed. Pro Transilvania, București, 2005, pp. 98–106.
- Nicolae Mătcaş : În : Aurel Sasu. Dicţionarul biografic al literaturii române, vol. II (M-Z). Ed. Paralela 45., Piteşti, 2006, pp. 82–83.
