= Druc Cabinet =

Government of Moldova

The Mircea Druc Cabinet was the cabinet of Moldova (May 25, 1990 – May 28, 1991).

In April, the Popular Front of Moldova won the 1990 parliamentary election. On May 24, 1990, the Mircea Druc Cabinet received the vote of confidence from the Parliament of Moldova, with 259 votes and 1 abstain.

== Membership ==
- Prime Minister of Moldova

Mircea Druc (25 May 1990 - 28 May 1991)

- Deputy prime-minister, Finance Minister

Valeriu Muravschi (6 June 1990 - 28 May 1991)

- Foreign Minister of Moldova

Nicolae Ţîu (6 June 1990 - 28 May 1991)

- Industry Minister

Alexandru Ion Barbu (9 iulie 1991 - ?)

- Minister of Agriculture and Food Industry

Andrei Sangheli (6 June 1990 - 28 May 1991)

- Minister of Education

Nicolae Mătcaş (?)

- Minister of Culture

Ion Ungureanu (6 June 1990 - 28 May 1991)

- Health Minister

Gheorghe Ghidirim (?)

- Justice Minister

Alexei Barbăneagră (6 June 1990 - 28 May 1991)

- Minister of national security (preşedinte al Comitetului pentru Securitatea Statului)

Tudor Botnaru (6 June 1990 - 28 May 1991)

- Minister of Internal Affairs of Moldova

General Ion Costaş (6 June 1990 - 28 May 1991)
