= Lypetske =

Rural locality in Odessa Oblast, Ukraine

Lypetske Липе́цьке Lipețchi
- Village
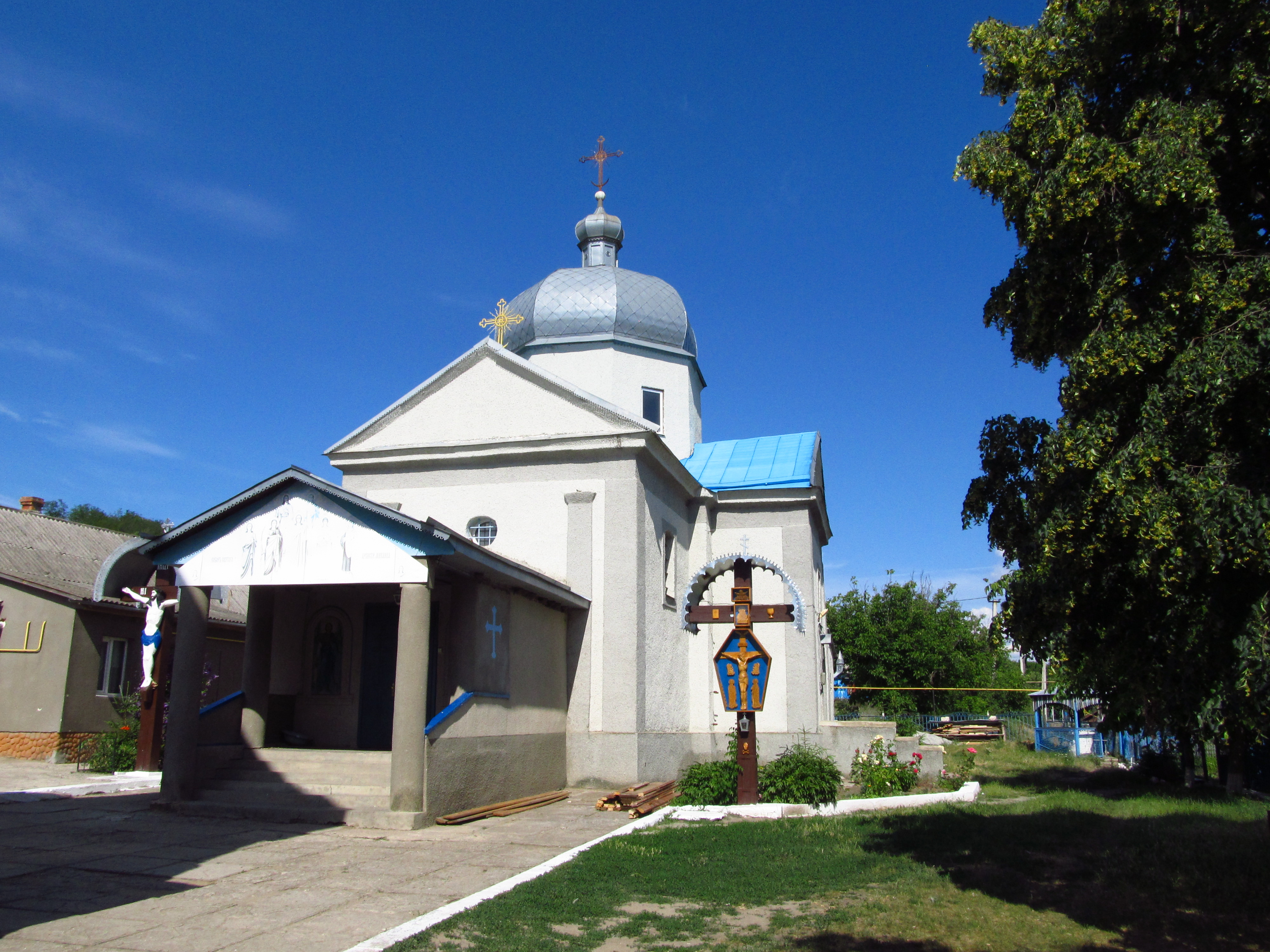
- Interactive map of Lypetske
- Location within Odesa Oblast Location within Ukraine
- Coordinates: 47°44′11″N 29°42′55″E
- Country: Ukraine
- Oblast: Odesa Oblast
- Raion: Podilsk Raion
- Hromada: Podilsk urban hromada
- Founded: 1753

Area
  - Total: 1,366 km^{2} (527 sq mi)
- Elevation: 121 m (397 ft)

Population
  - Total: 3,740
  - Density: 2,737.9/km^{2} (7,091/sq mi)
- Postal code: 66354

Lypetske (Ukrainian: Липе́цьке; Romanian: Lipețchi), is a village in Podilsk Raion, Odesa Oblast, Ukraine. It belongs to Podilsk urban hromada, one of the hromadas of Ukraine. The population is 3740 people.

== History ==
According to data for 1859 in the state village of Ananyiv District of Kherson Province lived 2542 people (1288 males and 1254 - females), there were 428 households, there was an Orthodox Church.

As of 1886, the former state village of Handrabury parish had 3,039 inhabitants, 589 yards, and an Orthodox church and school.

According to the 1897 census, the population grew to 5,446 (2,740 males and 2,706 females), of whom 5,188 were Orthodox.

At least 415 villagers died during the Soviet Holodomor of 1932–1933.

According to the 1989 census of the Ukrainian SSR, the current population of the village was 4,627, of whom 2,028 were men and 2,599 women.

According to the 2001 census of Ukraine, 3740 people lived in the village.

On 24 February 2022, during the Russian invasion of Ukraine, a military facility in Lipetske was bombed by the Russian military, resulting in the death of 18 people.

== Language ==
Population distribution by mother tongue according to the 2001 census:

Language	Percentage
Moldovan (Romanian)	90.08%
Russian	5.45%
Ukrainian	4.14%
Bulgarian	0.13%
Armenian	0.03%
Gagauz	0.03%

== Notable people ==
- Nicolae Ciornîi (born 1949), Moldovan businessman
- Kirill Ilyashenko (1915–1980), Soviet Moldavian politician
