= Novoselivka, Ananiv urban hromada, Podilsk Raion, Odesa Oblast =

Novoselivka
- Location in Ukraine
- Coordinates: 47°38′13″N 29°55′34″E
- Country: Ukraine
- Oblast: Odesa Oblast
- Raion: Podilsk Raion
- Hromada: Ananiv urban hromada
- Time zone: UTC+2 (EET)
  - Summer (DST): UTC+3 (EEST)

Novoselivka is a village located in Podilsk Raion of Odesa Oblast, Ukraine. It belongs to Ananiv urban hromada, one of the hromadas of Ukraine. The land had belonged to Pytor Mikhailovich Skarzhinsky Ataman of the Bug Cossacks.

Until 18 July 2020, Novoselivka belonged to Ananiv Raion. The raion was abolished in July 2020 as part of the administrative reform of Ukraine, which reduced the number of raions of Odesa Oblast to seven. The area of Ananiv Raion was merged into Podilsk Raion.

== Demographics ==
According to the 2001 Ukrainian census, the village had a population of 325 inhabitants. The native language composition was as follows:

Native languages in Novoselivka
| | percent |
| Ukrainian | 97.8% |
| Russian | 1.2% |
| Moldovan | 0.6% |
| Belarusian | 0.3% |
| others | 0.1% |
