= Ilyashenko =

Ilyashenko, Iliashenko, or Iliașenco (Ukrainian: Ільяшенко, Іляшенко, Ілляшенко; Russian: Ильяшенко) is an East Slavic surname. Notable people with the surname include:

- Kirill Ilyashenko (1915–1980), Moldovan politician
- Pavel Ilyashenko (born 1990), Kazakhstani pentathlete
- Yulij Ilyashenko (born 1943), Russian mathematician
