= Ananiv =

City in Odesa Oblast, Ukraine

Ananiv Ананьїв
- City
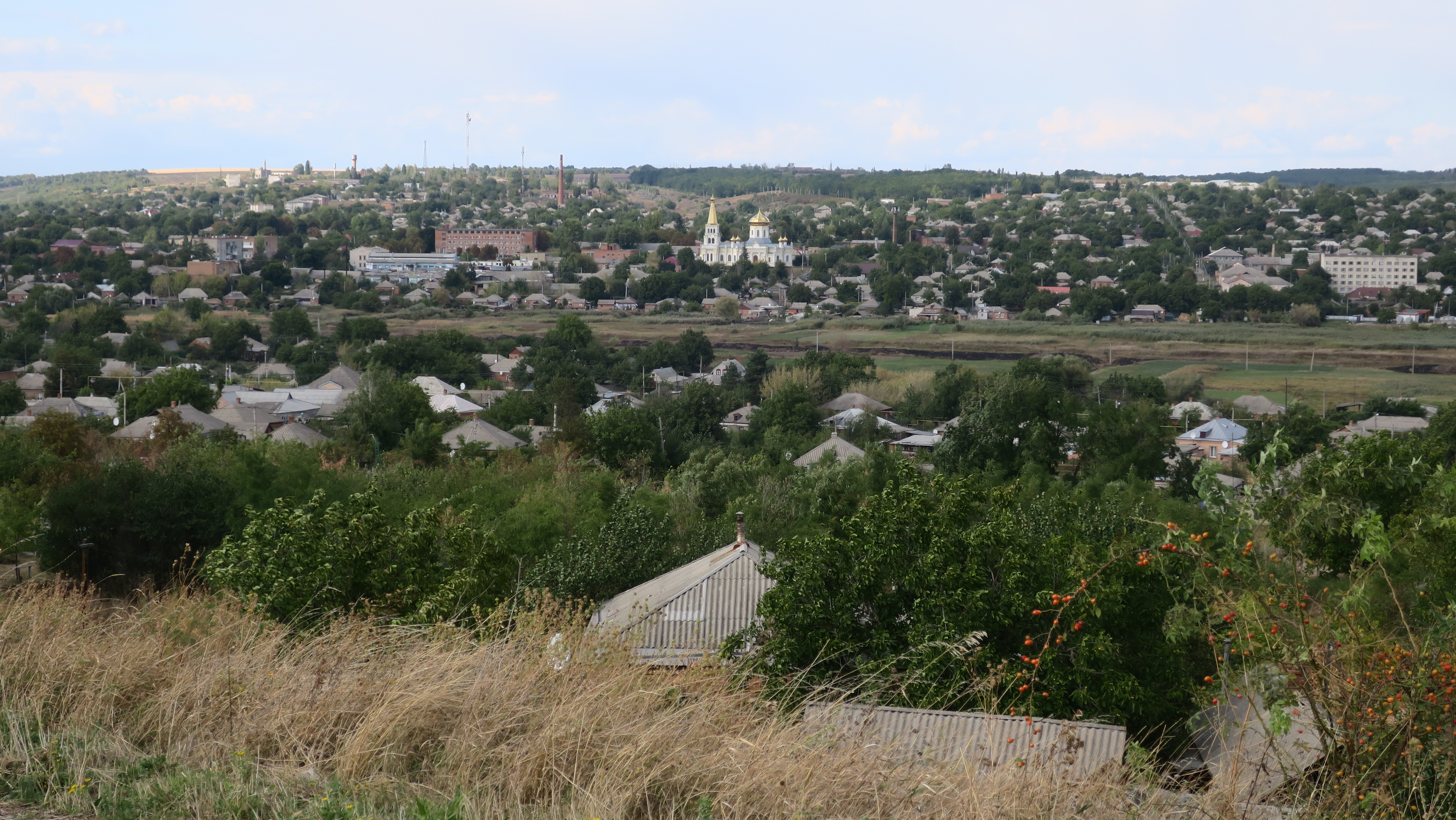
- Skyline of Ananiiv

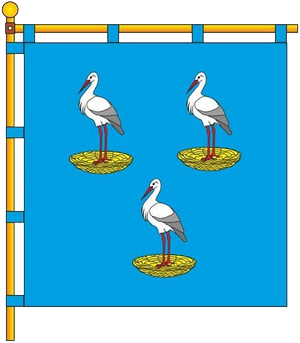
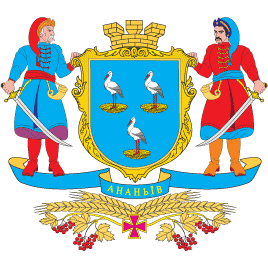
- Flag Coat of arms

- Location in Ukraine Ananiv (Ukraine)
- Coordinates: 47°43′N 29°58′E
- Country: Ukraine
- Oblast: Odesa Oblast
- Raion: Podilsk Raion
- Hromada: Ananiv urban hromada

Population (2022)
  - Total: 7,626
- Time zone: UTC+2 (EET)
  - Summer (DST): UTC+3 (EEST)
- Area code: +380 4863
- Climate: Dfb

Ananiv (Ukrainian: Ананьїв, romanized: Ananiiv pronounced [ɐˈnɑnʲjiu̯]; Russian: Ананьев, romanized: Ananyev; Yiddish: אַנאַניעוו, romanized: Ananiev; Romanian: Ananiev, also Nani) is a city of Podilsk Raion in Odesa Oblast, Ukraine. It hosts the administration of Ananiv urban hromada, one of the hromadas of Ukraine. Ananiv stands on the Tylihul River. According to the 2001 census, the majority of the population of Ananiv was Ukrainian -speaking (87.88%), with Russian (9.43%) and Romanian (2.08%) speakers in the minority. Population: 7,626 (2022 estimate).

== Geography ==
Ananiiv is located in the southeastern part of Podolian Upland.

== History ==
Ananiiv was founded in the mid-18th century, when the territory belonged to the Ottoman Empire. In 1792 it came under Russian rule according to the Treaty of Jassy and became a povit centre of Kherson Governorate. The town's development was sow due to its remoteness from main railways. From 1924 to 1940 it belonged to Moldavian Autonomous Soviet Socialist Republic. In 1932 the town was estimated to have 19,000 inhabitants. In the 20th century Ananiiv and the surrounding areas served as a centre of gardening, viticulture and food industry. Two museum functioned in the town.

Until 18 July 2020, Ananiv was the administrative center of Ananiv Raion. The raion was abolished in July 2020 as part of the administrative reform of Ukraine, which reduced the number of raions of Odesa Oblast to seven. The area of Ananiv Raion was merged into Podilsk Raion.

=== Jewish history ===
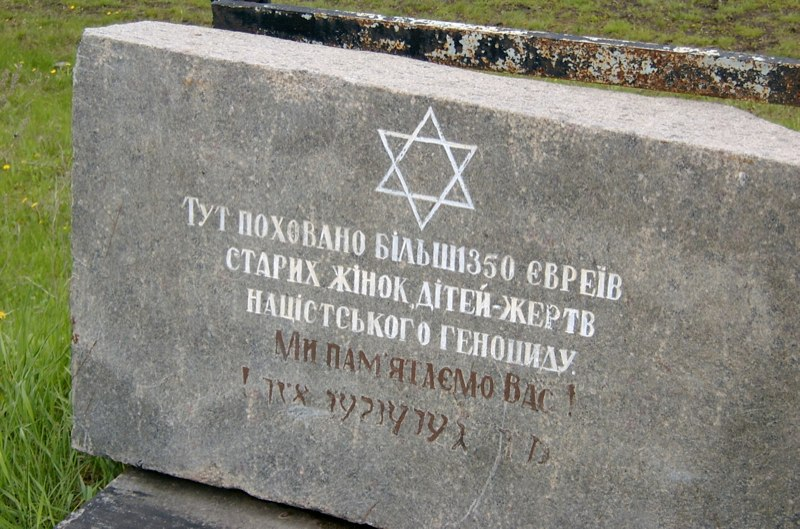
Memorial at a mass grave of Jews murdered during the Holocaust

Jews settled in Ananiv during the 19th century. By 1820, the Jewish community had established a synagogue and a cemetery. The original cemetery no longer exists, although a newer Jewish cemetery dating from the 20th century survives. Surnames recorded on its gravestones have been documented. Photographs of members of the Jewish community from the early 20th century have also been preserved.

The Jewish community suffered repeated outbreaks of antisemitic violence. In April 1887, a mob attacked the Jewish quarter, destroying 175 Jewish homes and 14 shops. Jews constituted approximately half of the town's population in 1897. By the beginning of the 20th century, approximately 3,500 Jews lived in Ananiv, comprising about 20 percent of its population.

During the Russian Civil War, the Jewish population was again subjected to violence. More than 40 Jews were killed in two pogroms in 1919. In early 1920, approximately 300 members of a Jewish self-defence organization fought Ukrainian armed groups; according to Yad Vashem, 220 members of the self-defence group were killed. The Jewish population subsequently declined because of the violence, migration, industrialization and urbanization. During the Soviet period, a Yiddish-language Jewish school operated in the town. On the eve of the German invasion of the Soviet Union in 1941, approximately 1,800 Jews lived in Ananiv.

==== The Holocaust ====
German forces occupied Ananiv on 7 August 1941. An unknown number of Jews had succeeded in fleeing eastward before the occupation. The remaining Jews were ordered to sew a yellow Star of David onto their clothing, were prohibited from moving freely through the town or buying food at the market, and were subjected to beatings. Seven Jews were shot on 15 August. On 28 August 1941, members of Einsatzkommando 10b murdered approximately 300 Jews from Ananiv; additional Jews who had hidden during the killing operation were captured and murdered during the following days.

On 1 September 1941, Ananiv was transferred to Romanian administration and incorporated into the Transnistria Governorate. Romanian authorities throughout Transnistria confined local Jews and deportees in approximately 150 improvised ghettos and camps, generally under conditions of severe overcrowding, hunger, disease and forced labour.

Approximately 300 Jews who remained in Ananiv were confined in a ghetto several days after the Romanian takeover. In early October 1941, approximately half of the ghetto's inhabitants were taken to an area near the village of Mostove and murdered. The remaining 145 Jews were transported in November to the village of Gvozdiovka under the pretext that they were being transferred to a labour camp and were murdered there.

A memorial marks one of the mass graves associated with the murders. In 1990, approximately 30 Jews remained in Ananiv.

== Demographics ==
According to the 2001 Ukrainian census, Ananiv had a population of 9,355 inhabitants. Ethnic Ukrainians account for almost 90% of the population, 7% declared an ethnic Russian background, and a bit less than 4% of the population referred to themselves as Moldovans. The exact distribution of the population by ethnicity was:

Ethnic composition of Ananiv
	percent
Ukrainians	87.63%
Russians	7.32%
Moldovans	3.57%
Belarusians	0.32%
Bulgarians	0.30%
Armenians	0.19%
Ashkenazi Jews	0.13%
Gagauz	0.11%

== Notable people ==
- Mykola Vilinsky

== Gallery ==
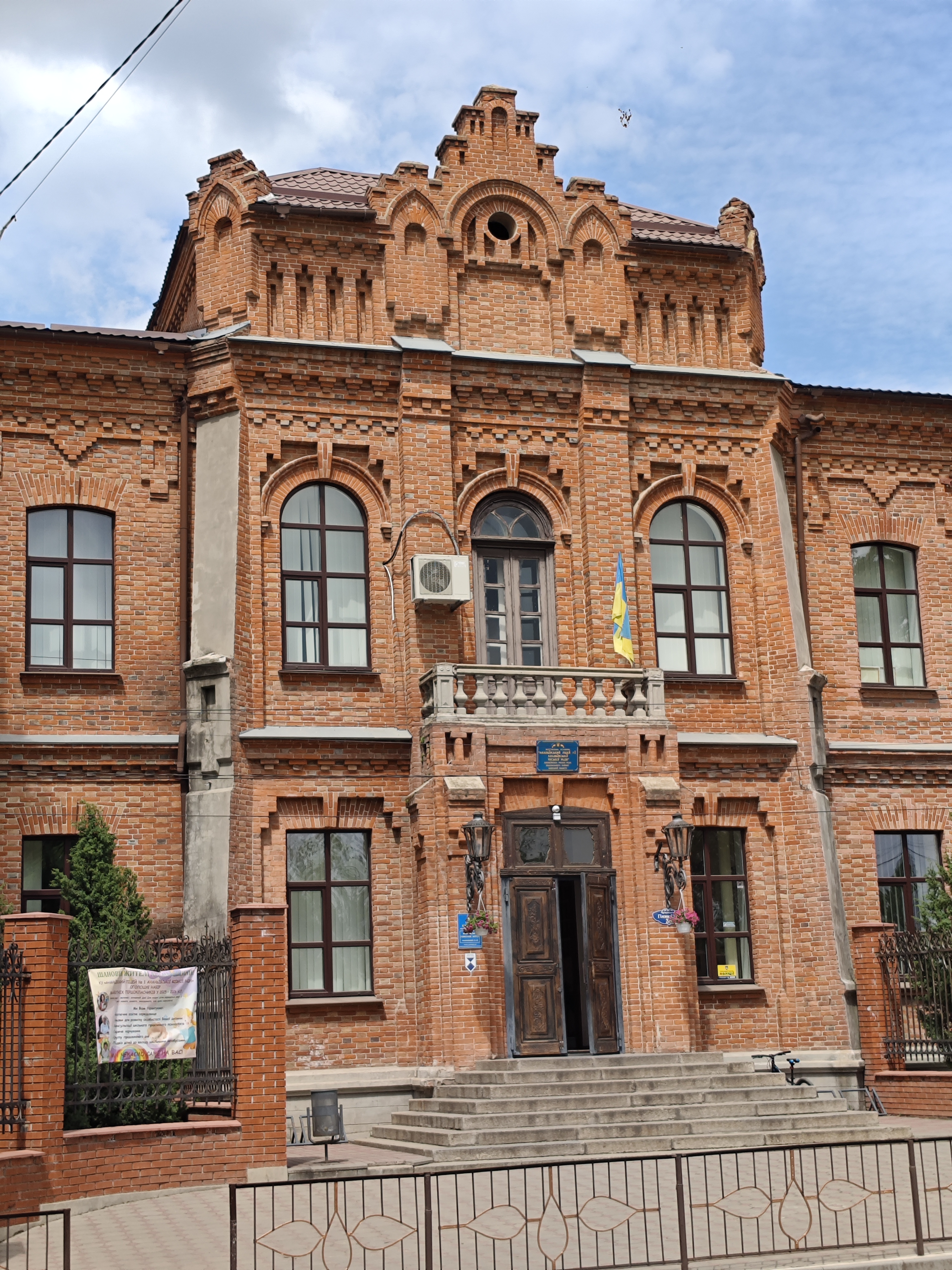
Men's gymnasium

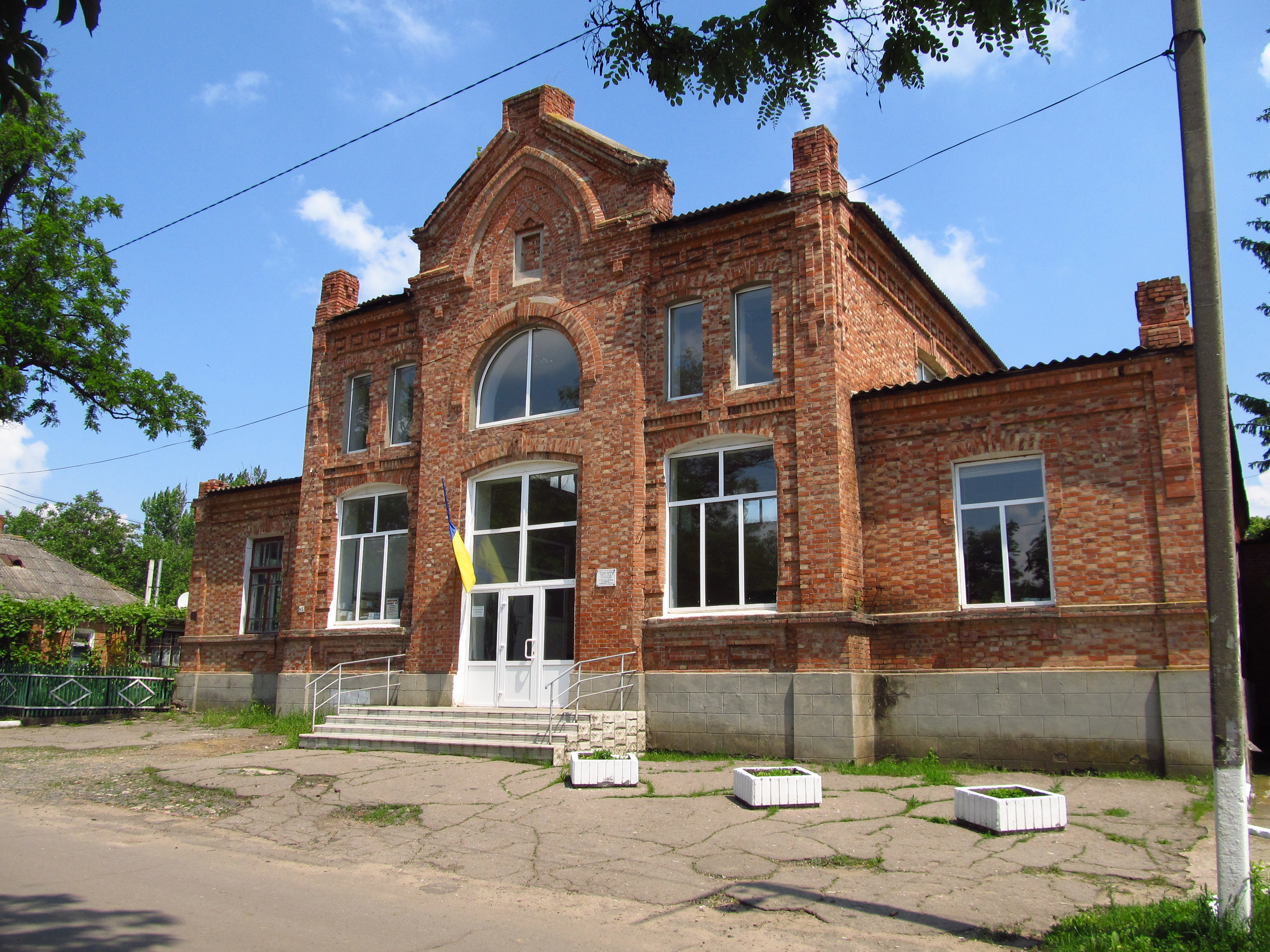
County hospital in Ananiv

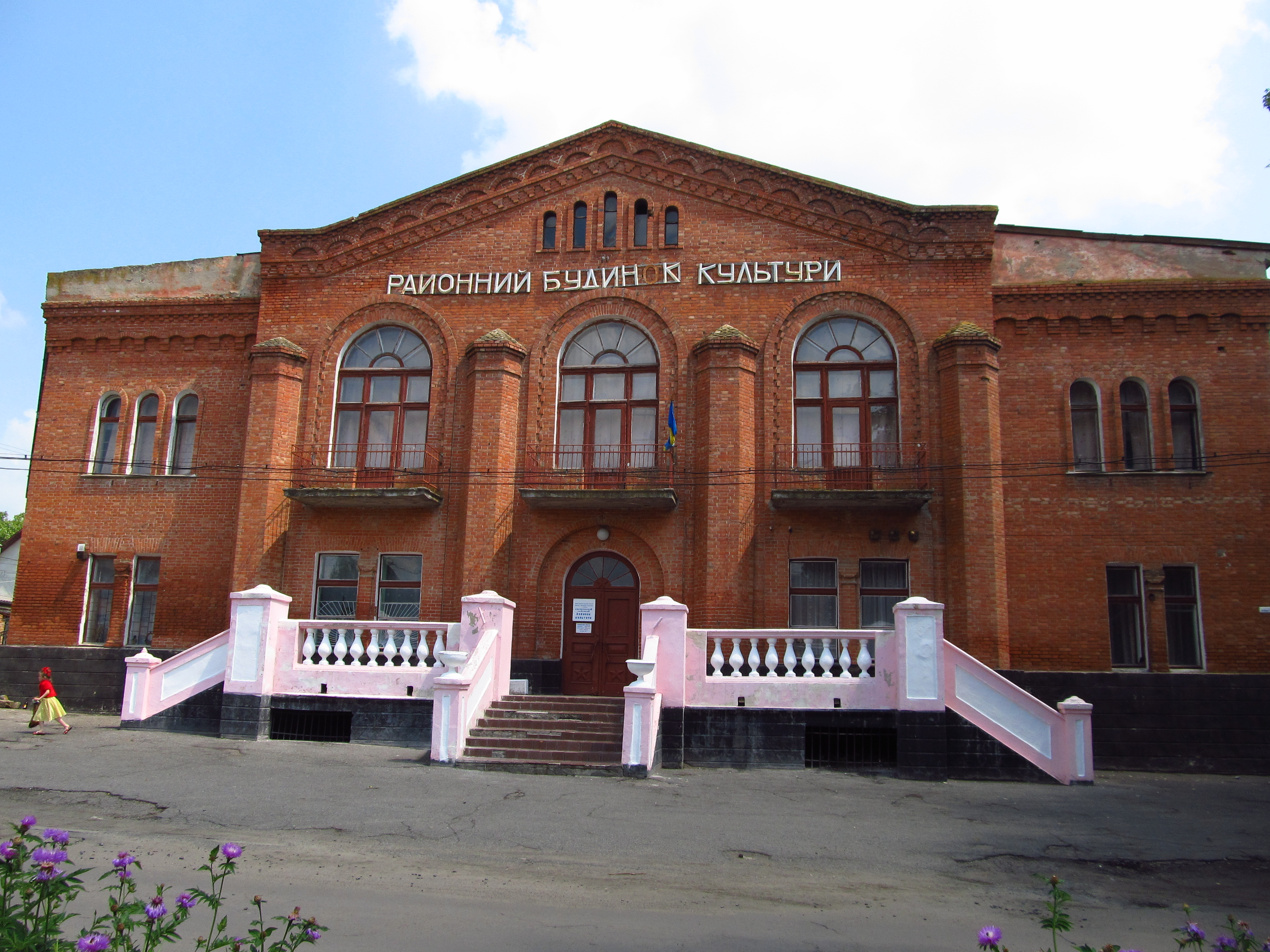
House of Culture (former Noble Assembly)

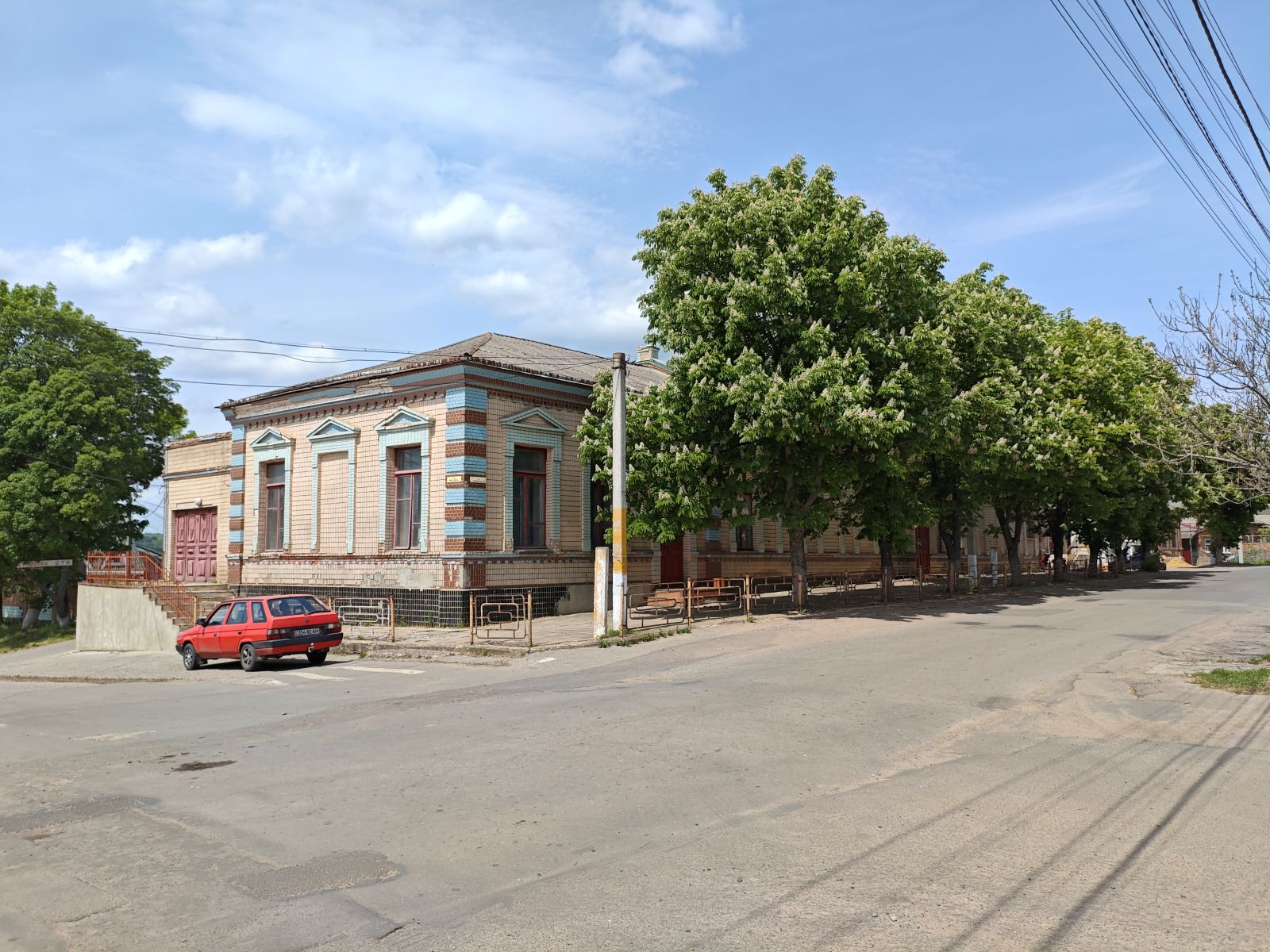
District court

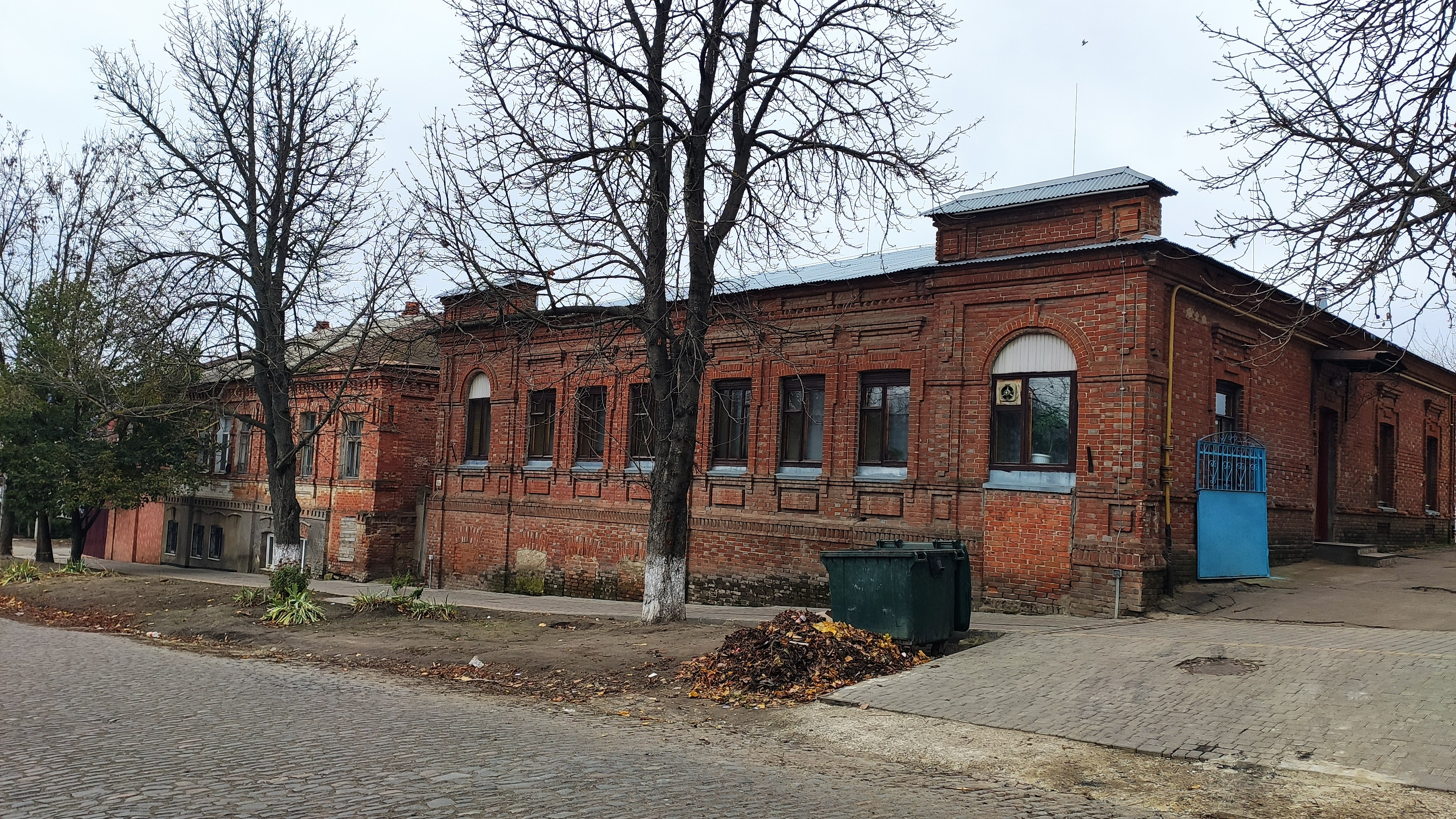
Residential houses

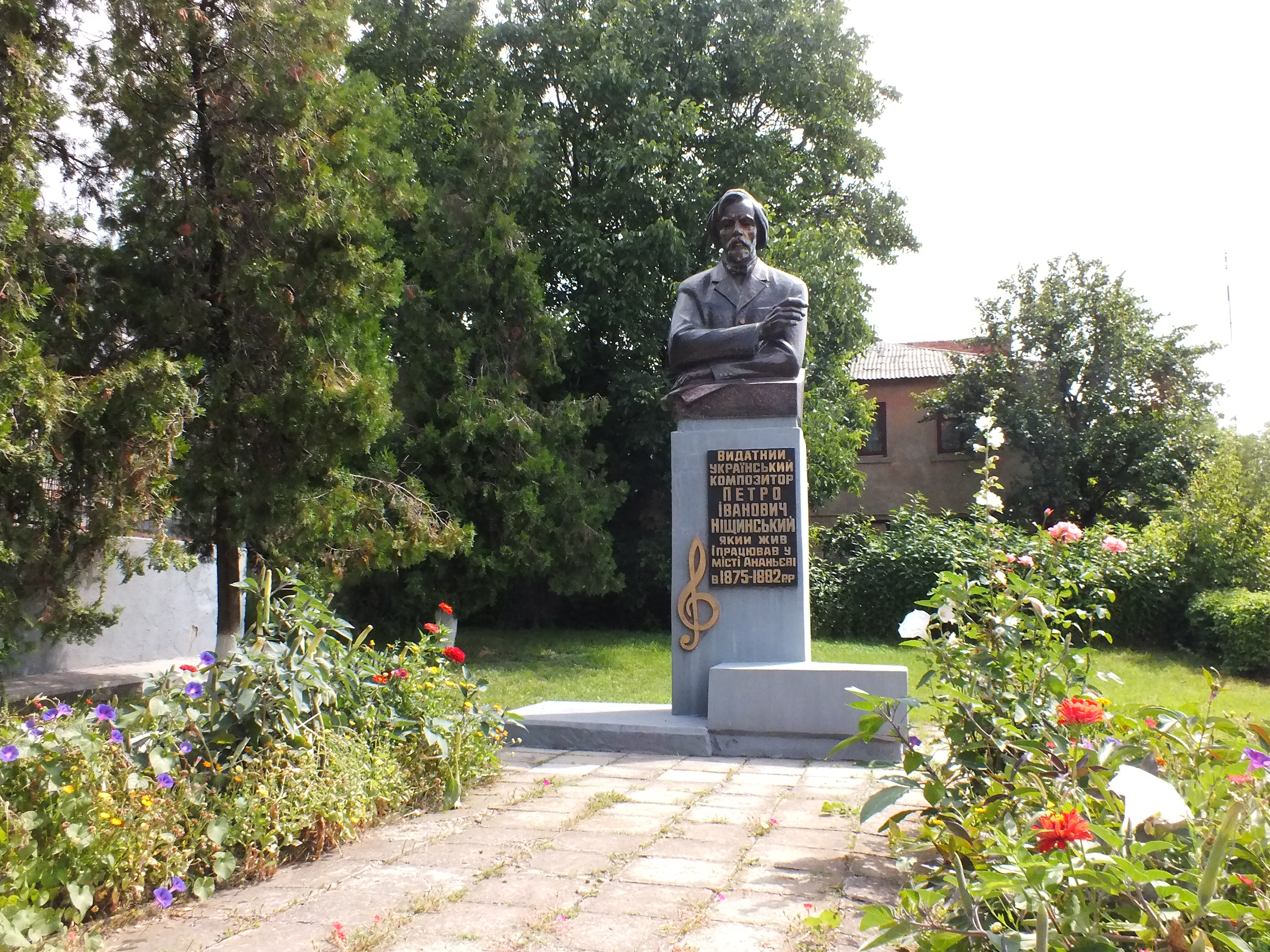
Monument to Petro Nishchynskyi in the city of Ananiv
