= Podilsk =

City in Odesa Oblast, Ukraine

Podilsk Подільськ
- City
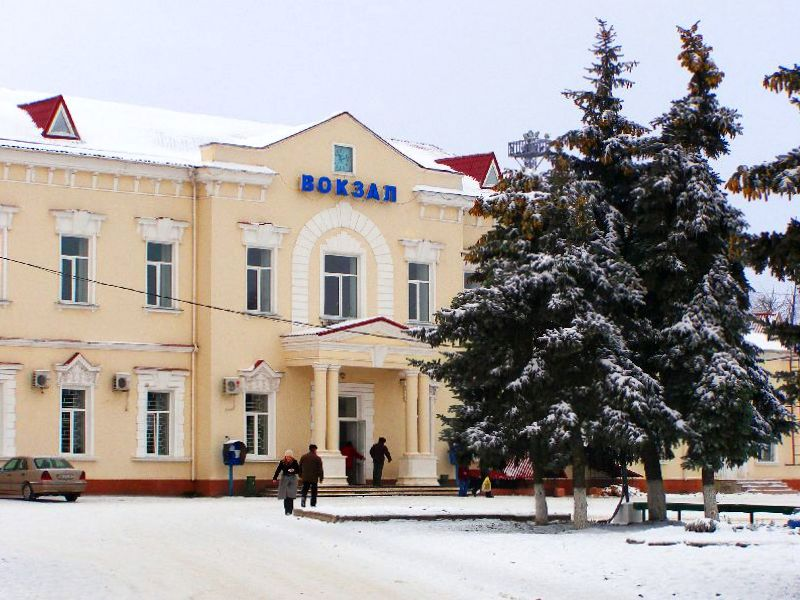
- Podilsk railway station

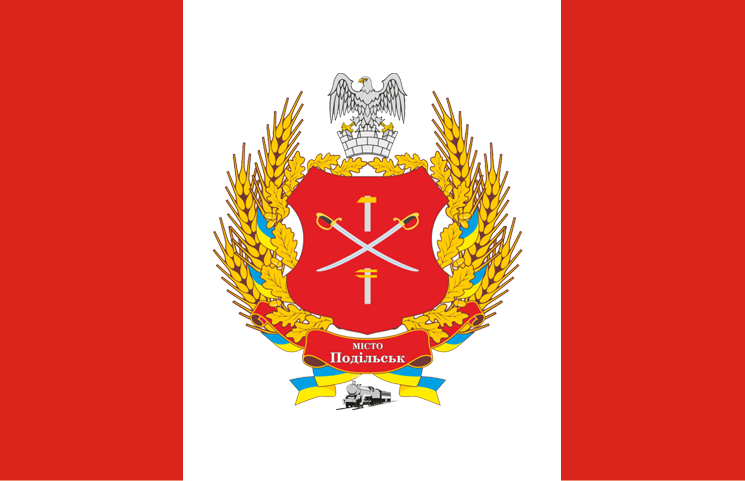
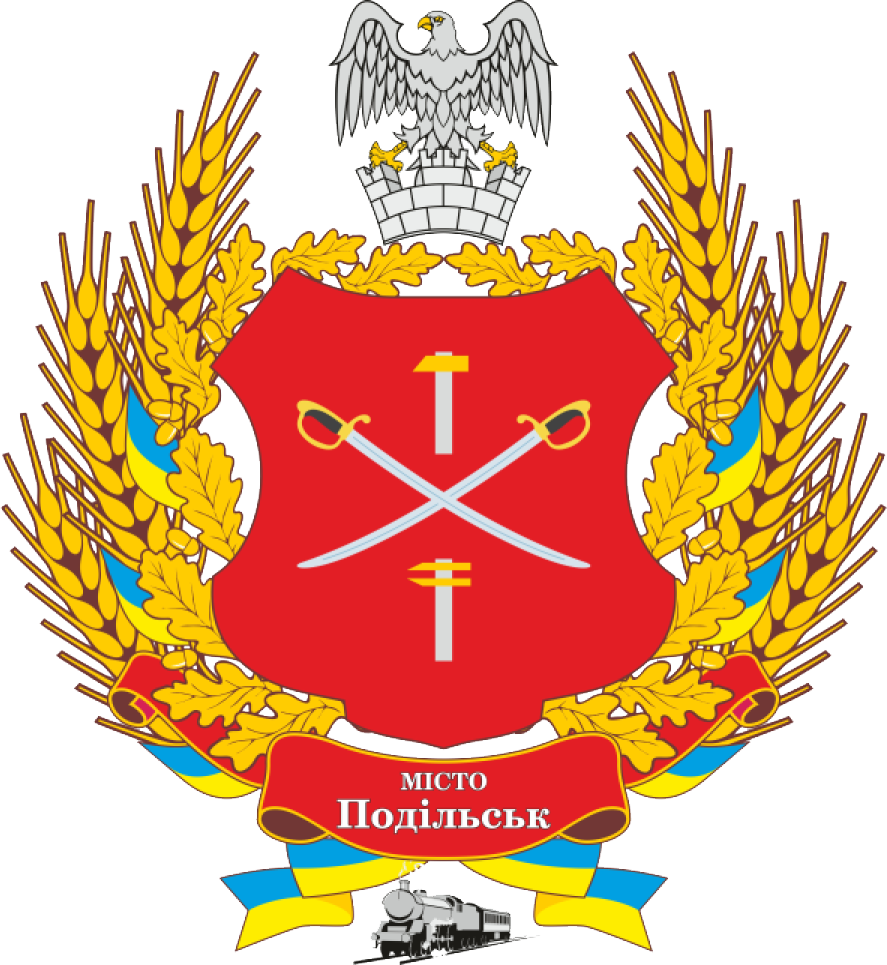
- Flag Coat of arms

- Location within Odesa Oblast Location within Ukraine
- Coordinates: 47°44′31″N 29°32′06″E
- Country: Ukraine
- Oblast: Odesa Oblast
- Raion: Podilsk Raion
- Hromada: Podilsk urban hromada

Area
  - Total: 25.44 km^{2} (9.82 sq mi)
- Elevation: 248 m (814 ft)

Population (2022)
  - Total: 39,220
  - Density: 1,542/km^{2} (3,993/sq mi)
- Time zone: UTC+2
- Postal code: 66300—314
- Area code: +380-4862
- Climate: Dfb
- Website: podilska-gromada.gov.ua

Podilsk (Ukrainian: Подільськ, pronounced [poˈd⁽ʲ⁾ilʲsʲk]; Romanian: Bârzula or Bârzu), until May 2016 Kotovsk (Ukrainian: Котовськ; Russian: Котовск) is a city in Odesa Oblast, southern Ukraine. Administratively, Podilsk serves as the administrative center of Podilsk Raion, one of seven districts of Odesa Oblast. It also hosts the administration of Podilsk urban hromada, one of the hromadas of Ukraine.

It had a population of 39,220 (2022 estimate). In 2001, it had a population of 40,718. It is the largest city in the northern part of Odesa Oblast.

== History ==
Birzula was first mentioned in Ottoman documents in 1772 as one of the settlements of the Dubossar (Dubăsari) raya. The physicist Gleb Wataghin was born in Birzula in 1899.

The city is known as the place where Soviet military leader Grigori Kotovsky was buried in a mausoleum. It was part of the Moldavian Autonomous Soviet Socialist Republic from 1924 to 1940. In 1935, the city was renamed Kotovsk after him; formerly the settlement bore the name Birzula. The mausoleum was later destroyed during the Romanian administration of Transnistria. The monument was (again) dismantled in June 2017 to comply with decommunization laws.

A Vladimir Lenin statue in Kotovsk was pushed off its pedestal and broken into several pieces on 9 December 2013. On 21 May 2016, Verkhovna Rada adopted decision to rename Kotovsk to Podilsk and Kotovsk Raion to Podilsk Raion according to the laws prohibiting names of Communist origin.

Until 18 July 2020, Podilsk was incorporated as a city of oblast significance and served as the administrative center of Podilsk Raion though it did not belong to the raion. In July 2020, as part of the administrative reform of Ukraine, which reduced the number of raions of Odesa Oblast to seven, the city of Podilsk was merged into Podilsk Raion.

== Demographics ==
According to the 2001 Ukrainian census, Podilsk had a population of 40,664 inhabitants. Ethnic Ukrainians account for over 80% of the population, 10% refer to themselves as Russians, and 5% are Moldovans. The exact distribution of the population by ethnicity was:

Ethnic composition of Podilsk (formerly Kotovsk)
| | percent |
| Ukrainians | 82.25% |
| Russians | 10.34% |
| Moldovans | 5.12% |
| Belarusians | 0.46% |
| Bulgarians | 0.20% |
| Armenians | 0.15% |
| Ashkenazi Jews | 0.14% |
| Poles | 0.08% |
| Gagauz | 0.06% |

Native language composition according to the 2001 Ukrainian census:

Native languages in Podilsk
| | percent |
| Ukrainian | 70.3% |
| Russian | 26.5% |
| "Moldovan" (Romanian) | 2.3% |
| Romani | 0.3% |
| Belarusian | 0.1% |
| others | 0.3% |

== Transportation ==
The city has a major railway station and depot on the Odesa—Zhmerynka line (a stretch of the Rozdilna—Poberezhzhia line).

== Notable people ==
- Vitaly Ignatiev (born 1980), foreign minister and diplomat of Moldova's unrecognized breakaway region of Transnistria
- Nikolai Morshen (1917–2001), Russian second-wave émigré poet and translator of American poetry into Russian
- Volodymyr Muntyan (1946–2025), Soviet and Ukrainian midfielder of the 1960s and 1970s
- Viktor Seliverstov (born 1954), Russian political figure and deputy of the 7th and 8th State Dumas
- Gleb Wataghin (1899–1986), famous Ukrainian-Italian theoretical and experimental physicist
- Valentyn Zghursky (1927–2014), head of the executive committee of the Kyiv City Council

== Gallery ==
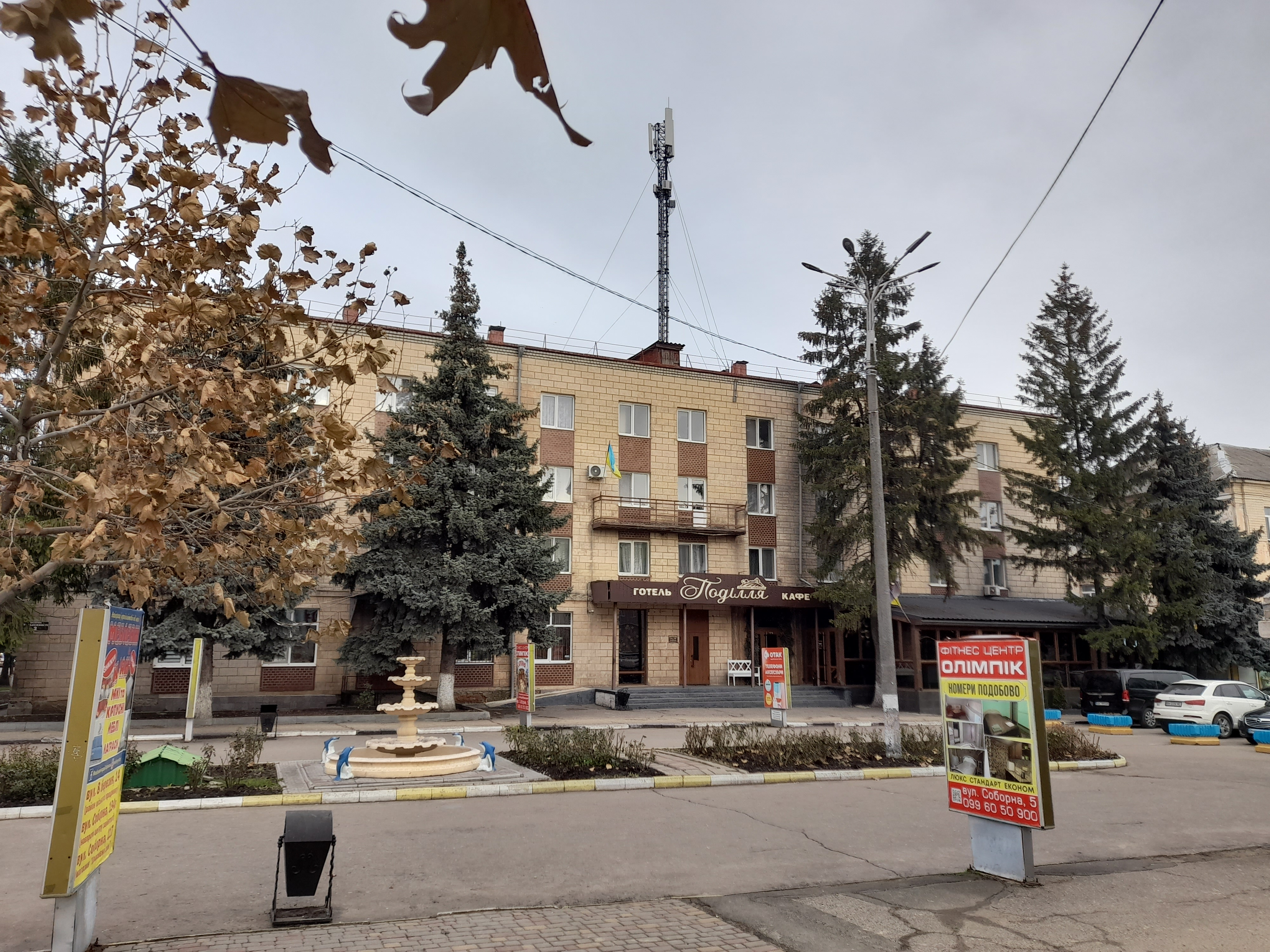
Podilla Hotel in Podilsk

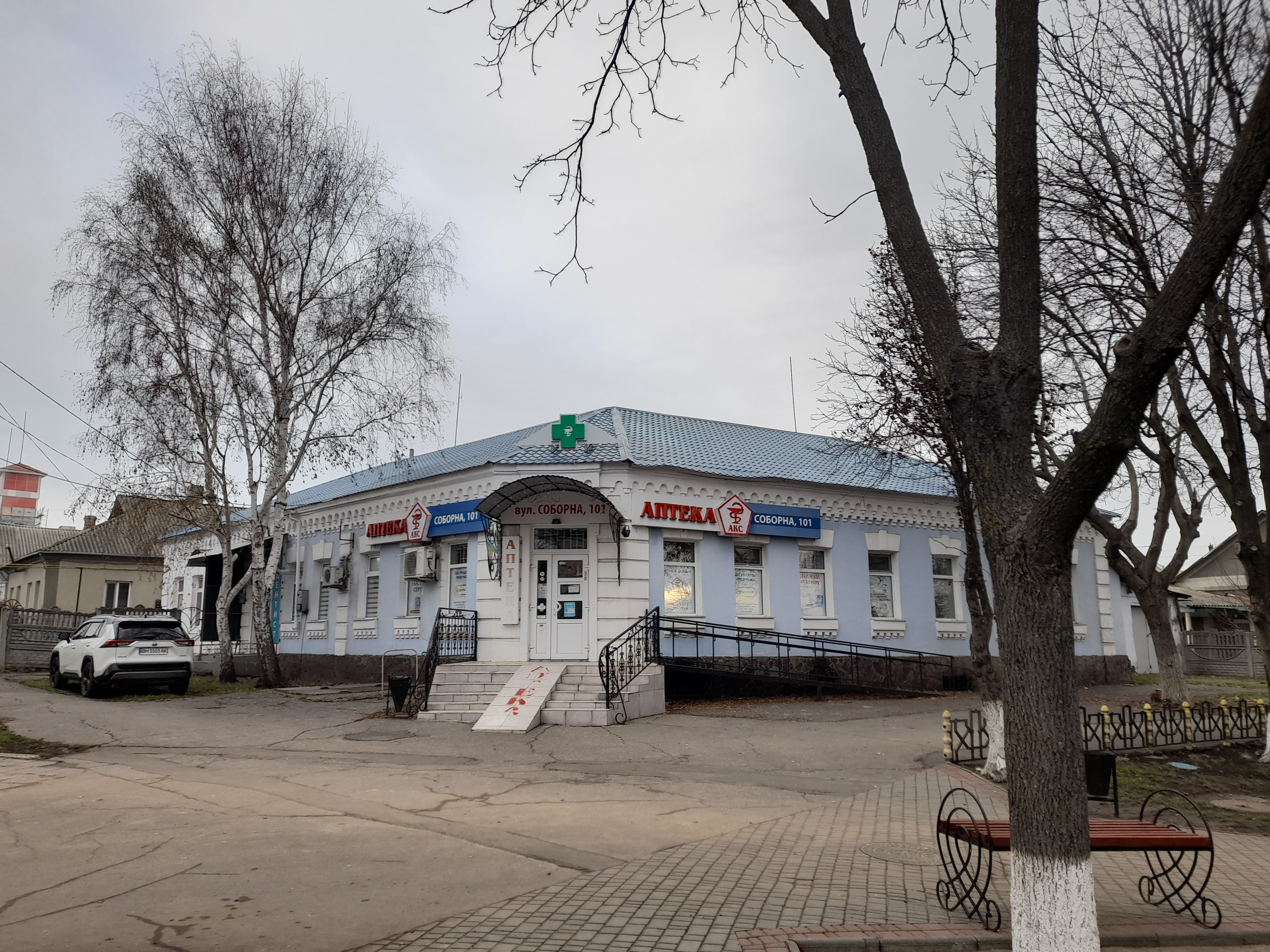
Pharmacy

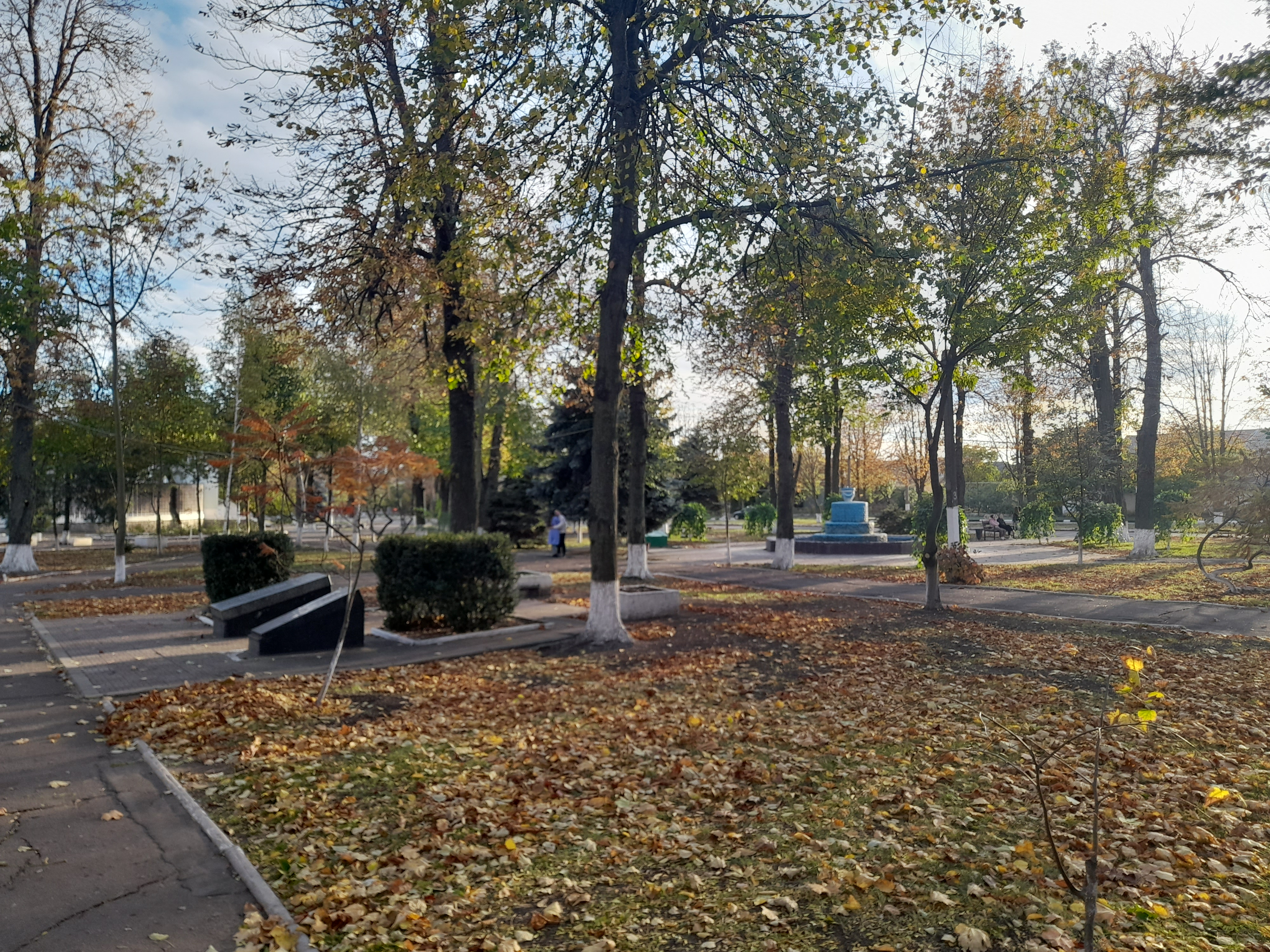
City park

== See also ==
- List of cities in Ukraine
