= Ion Ustian =

Moldovan politician (born 1939)

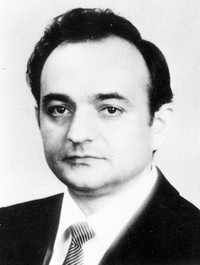

Chairman of the Council of Ministers of the Moldavian SSR
- In office 30 December 1980 – 24 December 1985
- Preceded by: Semion Grossu
- Succeeded by: Ivan Calin

Minister of Foreign Affairs of the Moldavian SSR
- In office 31 December 1980 – 29 December 1981
- Premier: Himself
- Preceded by: Semion Grossu
- Succeeded by: Petru Comendant

Personal details
- Born: 12 September 1939 (age 86) Olișcani, Kingdom of Romania
- Party: Communist Party of the Soviet Union

Ion Ustian (born 12 September 1939) is a Soviet and Moldovan politician.

== Biography ==
Ion Ustian was born on 12 September 1939 in Olișcani, Șoldănești District.

Ion Ustian was the prime minister of the Moldavian Soviet Socialist Republic (30 December 1980 – 24 December 1985).

Later that year, he was wounded in a car accident, but made a quick recovery.

== Works ==
- Laureații Premiului Nobel în economie (Editura Știința, Chișinău, 1999)
- Omul produce scopuri... : Eminescu și economia teoretică (Ed. Cartea Moldovei, Chișinău, 2000)
- Пушкин и политэкономия (Кишинев, 2002)

Political offices
Preceded by Semion Grossu	Chairman of the Council of Ministers of the Moldavian SSR; 30 December 1980 – 24 December 1985	Succeeded by Ivan Calin
