= Ivan Calin =

Moldovan politician (1935–2012)

Ivan Calin OR

Member of the Moldovan Parliament
- In office 21 April 1998 – 28 December 2010
- Parliamentary group: Party of Communists

Chairman of the Council of Ministers of the Moldavian SSR
- In office 24 December 1985 – 10 January 1990
- Preceded by: Ion Ustian
- Succeeded by: Petru Pascari

Chairman of the Presidium of the Supreme Soviet of the Moldavian SSR
- In office 19 April 1980 – 24 December 1985
- Premier: Semion Grossu; Ion Ustian
- Preceded by: Kirill Ilyashenko
- Succeeded by: Alexandru Mocanu

Personal details
- Born: 10 March 1935 Plopi, Moldavian ASSR, Ukrainian SSR, Soviet Union (now Moldova)
- Died: 2 January 2012 (aged 76) Chișinău, Moldova
- Party: Communist Party of Moldova
- Other political affiliations: Party of Communists

Ivan Calin (10 March 1935 – 2 January 2012) was a Soviet and Moldovan agronomist-scholar, political scientist, diplomat and politician.

== Biography ==
Calin was born in the small village of Plopi in Rîbnița District, then in Moldavian Autonomous Soviet Socialist Republic.

Calin was President of the Presidium of the Supreme Soviet of the Moldavian SSR from 10 April 1980 to 24 December 1985. Following this he became prime minister of the Moldavian SSR until 10 January 1990.

He was elected as member of the Parliament of Moldova in the 1998 election, 2005 election, April 2009 election and July 2009 election.

Until the speaker was elected, the plenary meetings of the Moldovan Parliament were chaired by the oldest MP, making Calin the acting speaker from 5 to 12 May 2009.

== Awards ==
- Order of Lenin
- Three Orders of the Red Banner of Labour
- Order of the Republic

Political offices
Preceded by Ion Ustian	Chairman of the Council of Ministers of the Moldavian SSR; 24 December 1985 – 10 January 1990	Succeeded by Petru Pascari
