= Podilsk urban hromada =

Coordinates: 47°44′N 29°32′E

Podilsk urban hromada Подільська міська громада
- Hromada
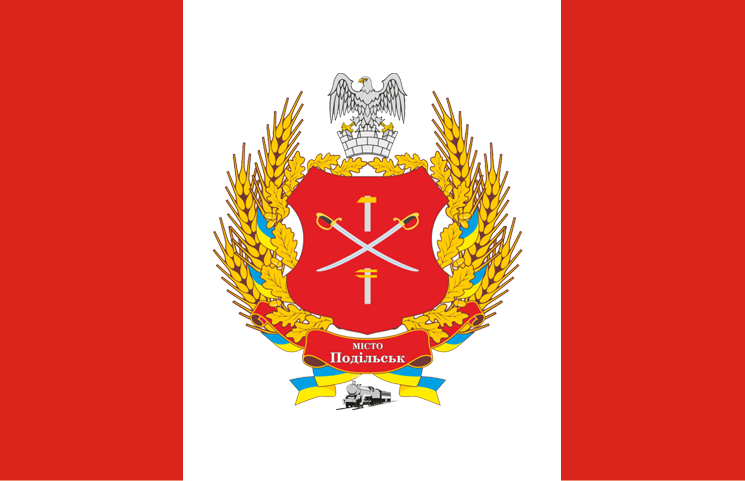
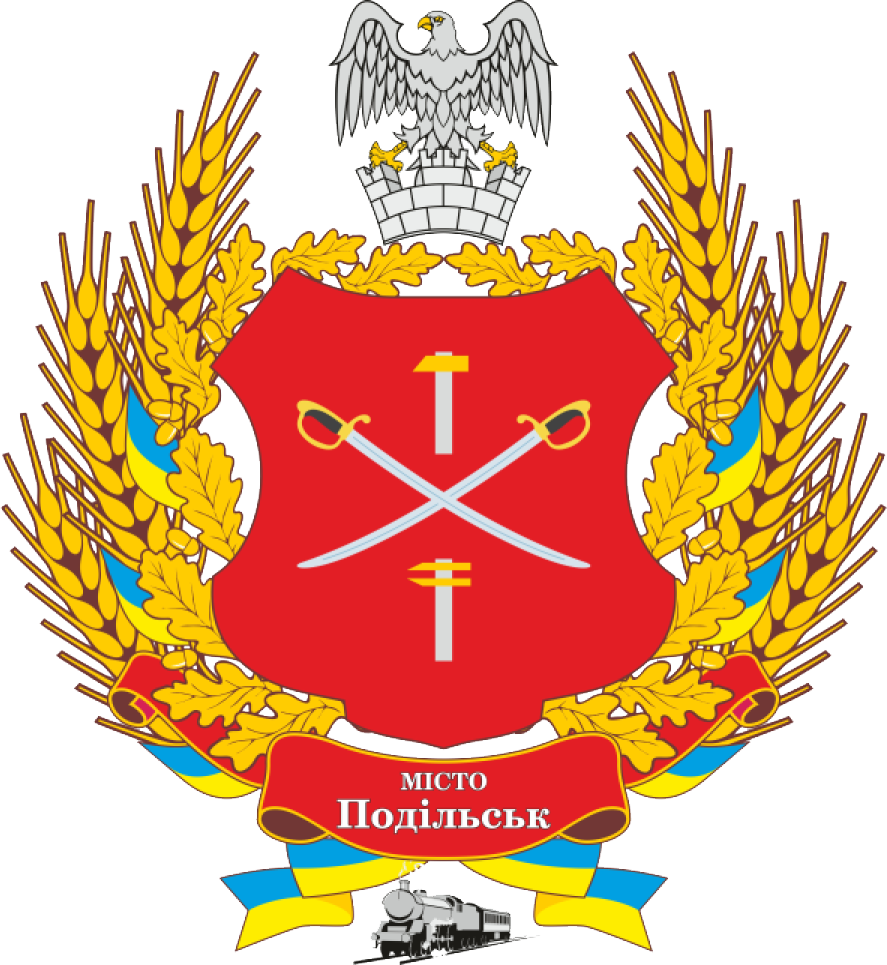
- Flag Coat of arms
- Interactive map of Podilsk urban hromada
- Country: Ukraine
- Oblast: Odesa Oblast
- Raion: Podilsk Raion
- Admin. center: Podilsk

Area
  - Total: 124.7 km^{2} (48.1 sq mi)

Population (2020)
  - Total: 43,567
  - Density: 349.4/km^{2} (904.9/sq mi)
- CATOTTG code: UA51120190000044451
- Settlements: 4
- Cities: 1
- Villages: 3

Podilsk urban hromada (Ukrainian: Подільська міська громада) is a hromada in Podilsk Raion of Odesa Oblast in southwestern Ukraine. Population: 43,567 (2020 est.)

The hromada consists of a city of Podilsk and 3 villages: Kazbeky, Lypetske and Oleksandrivka.

== Links ==
- "Подільська територіальна громада".
