= Petru Pascari =

Moldovan politician (1929–2025)

Petru Pascari OR
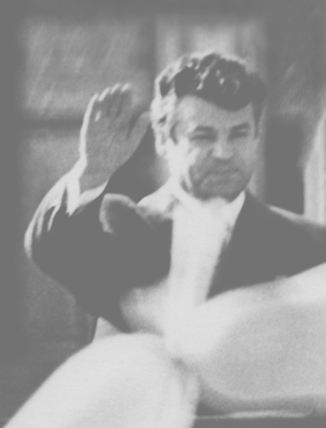
- Pascari in 1976

Chairman of the Council of Ministers of the Moldavian SSR
- In office 10 January 1990 – 26 May 1990
- Preceded by: Ivan Calin
- Succeeded by: Mircea Druc (as Prime Minister of SSR Moldova)
- In office 24 April 1970 – 1 August 1976
- Preceded by: Alexandru Diordiță
- Succeeded by: Semion Grossu

Personal details
- Born: 22 September 1929 Stroenți, Moldavian ASSR, Ukrainian SSR, Soviet Union (now Moldova)
- Died: 20 November 2025 (aged 96) Moscow, Russia
- Party: Communist Party of Moldavia^{1}
- 1. Ivan Bodiul and Petru Lucinschi were first secretaries of the Communist Party of Moldova at that time.

Petru Pascari, Russified as Pyotr Andreyevich Paskar (Note: In this name that follows East Slavic naming customs, the patronymic is Andreyevich and the family name is Paskar.) (Russian: Пётр Андреевич Паскарь; 22 September 1929 – 20 November 2025), was a Soviet and Moldovan politician. He was on two occasions the Chairman of the Council of Ministers of the Moldavian SSR: 24 April 1970 – 1 August 1976 (1st time) and 10 January 1990 – 26 May 1990 (2nd time).

== Life and career ==
Petru Pascari was born on 22 September 1929 in the small village of Stroenți (Stroiești), in the north of Transnistria, in Rîbnița District.

From 1946 to 1949, he worked at a wine-making technical school in the village of Saharna before enrolling in the Chisinau Agricultural Institute (now State Agrarian University of Moldova). For ten years after he worked as an agronomist before becoming a minister in the cabinet. In December 1962, he became Secretary of the Central Committee of the Communist Party of Moldova. He served his first stinct as premier in April 1970, at the same time serving as Minister of Foreign Affairs of the Moldavian SSR. In July 1976, he was appointed First Deputy Chairman of Gosplan. In early 1990, he returned to Moldova to serve as premier for a second time.

In June 1990, he became a personal pensioner and lived in Moscow.

Pascari died on 20 November 2025, at the age of 96.

== Honours and awards ==
- (Moldova) Order of the Republic
- (Soviet Union) Order of Lenin (2)
- (Soviet Union) Order of the Red Banner of Labour (2)

== Notes ==
Political offices
Preceded by Ivan Calin	Chairman of the Council of Ministers of the Moldavian SSR; 10 January 1990 – 26 May 1990	Succeeded by Mircea Druc
Preceded by Alexandru Diordiță	Chairman of the Council of Ministers of the Moldavian SSR; 24 August 1970 – 1 August 1976	Succeeded by Semion Grossu
