= Ananiv Raion =

Former subdivision of Odesa Oblast, Ukraine

Ananiv Raion Ананьївський район
- Raion
- Ananivskyi raion
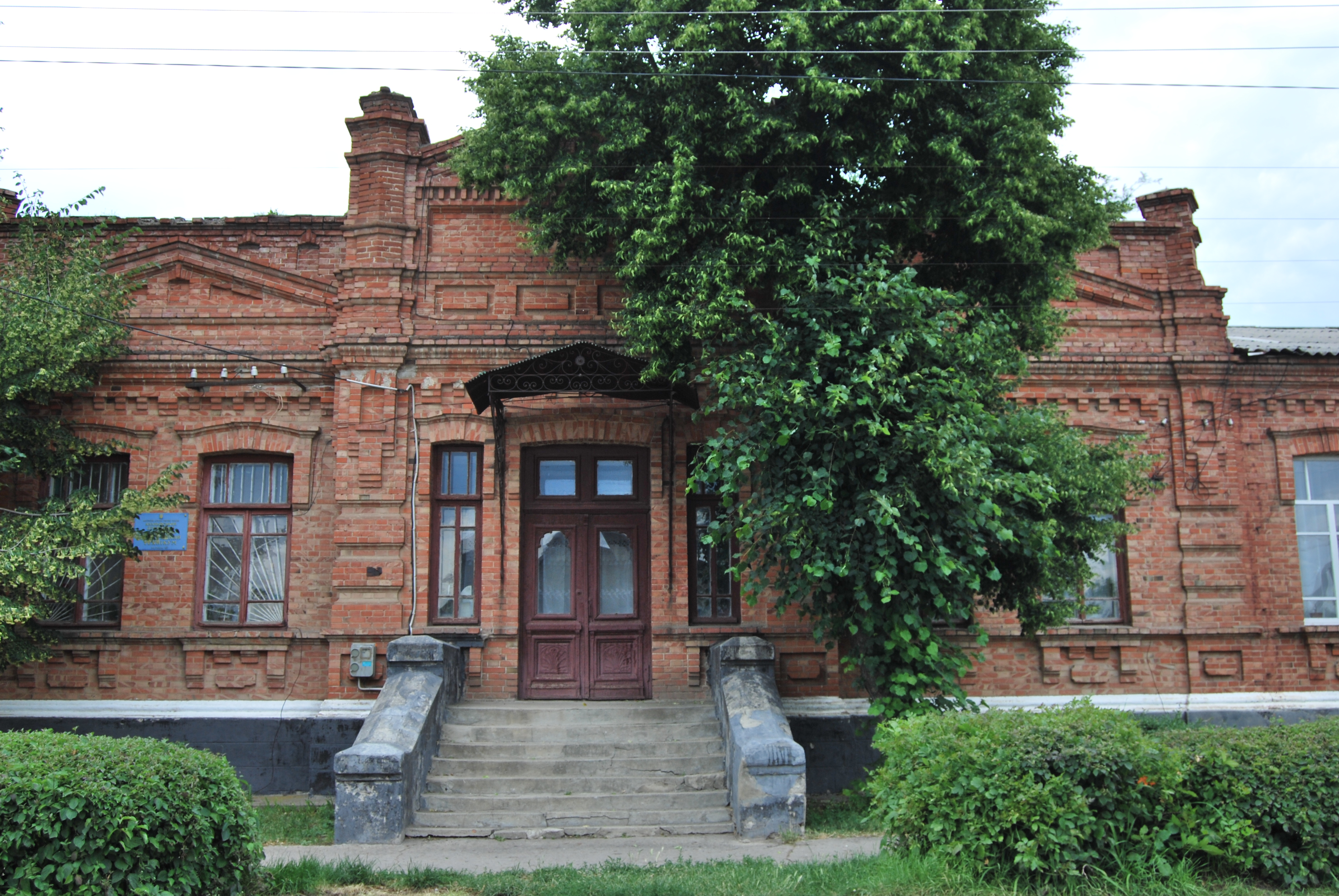
- Ananyiv Vocational Agricultural Lyceum

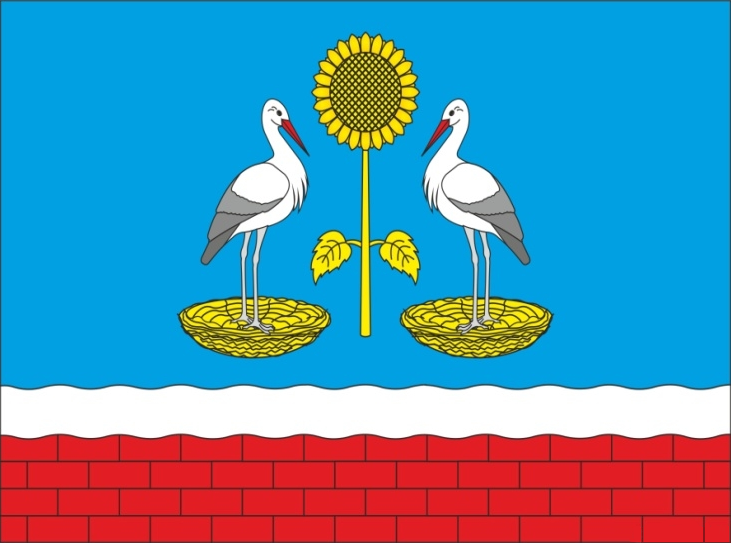
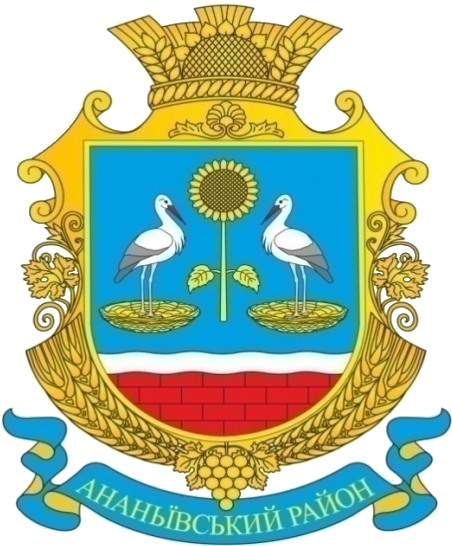
- Flag Coat of arms

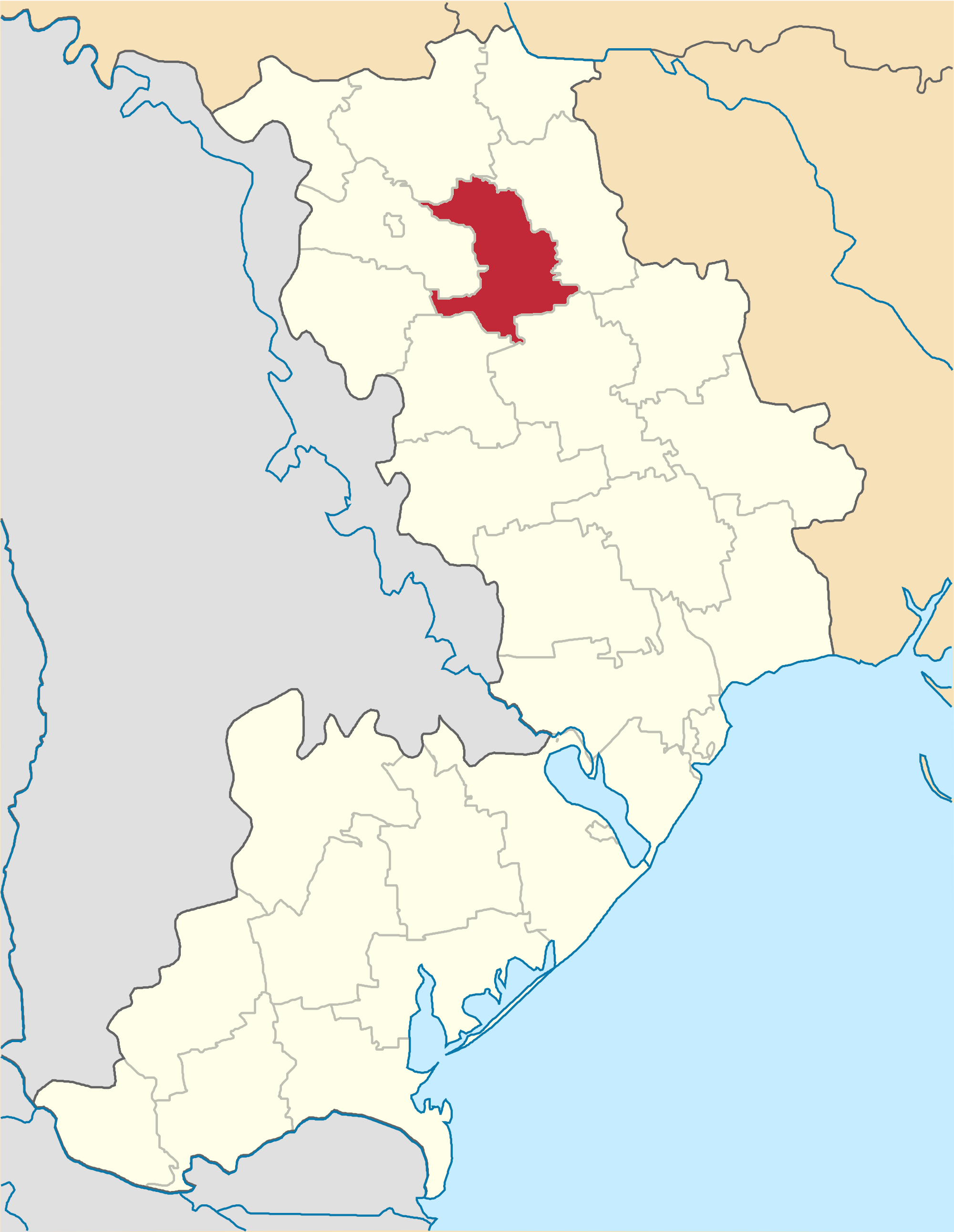
- Coordinates: 47°43′N 29°58′E
- Country: Ukraine
- Oblast: Odesa Oblast
- Established: 1961
- Disestablished: 18 July 2020
- Admin. center: Ananiv
- Subdivisions: List: 1 — city councils; — settlement councils; 14 — rural councils; Number of localities: 1 — cities; — urban-type settlements; 31 — villages; 0 — rural settlements

Government
  - Governor: Vyacheslav Serbin

Area
  - Total: 1,104.68 km^{2} (426.52 sq mi)

Population (2020)
  - Total: 25,393 ▼
  - Density: 22.987/km^{2} (59.535/sq mi)
- Time zone: UTC+2 (EET)
  - Summer (DST): UTC+3 (EEST)
- Postal index: 66400—66447
- Area code: +380 4863
- Website: http://ananiev-rda.odessa.gov.ua

Ananiv Raion (Ukrainian: Ананьївський район) was a raion (district) in Odesa Oblast of Ukraine. Its administrative center was the city of Ananiv. The raion was abolished on 18 July 2020 as part of the administrative reform of Ukraine, which reduced the number of raions of Odesa Oblast to seven. Its territory became part of Podilsk Raion. According to the 2001 census, the majority of the Ananiev district's population spoke Ukrainian (78.17%), with a minority of Romanian (16.09%) and Russian (5.27%) speakers. The last estimate of the raion population was 25,393 (2020 est.).

At the time of disestablishment, the raion consisted of two hromadas:

- Ananiv urban hromada with the administration in Ananiv;
- Dolynske rural hromada with the administration in the selo of Dolynske.
