= Plopi, Transnistria =

Plopi Plopi Плоть (Russian) Плоть (Ukrainian)
- Village
- Location within Moldova
- Coordinates: 47°57′15″N 29°9′48″E
- Country (de jure): Moldova
- Country (de facto): Transnistria (Note: Transnistria's political status is disputed. It considers itself to be an independent state, but this is not recognised by any UN member state. The Moldovan government and the international community consider Transnistria a part of Moldova's territory.)
- Elevation: 120 m (390 ft)
- Time zone: UTC+2 (EET)
  - Summer (DST): UTC+3 (EEST)

Plopi (Moldovan Cyrillic: Плопь; Russian and Ukrainian: Плоть, romanized: Plot') is a village in the Rîbnița District of Transnistria, Moldova. It has since 1990 been administered as a part of the self-proclaimed Pridnestrovian Moldavian Republic.

According to the 2004 census, the population of the village was 1,277 inhabitants, of which 1,174 (91.93%) were Moldovans (Romanians), 69 (5.4%) Ukrainians and 29 (2.27%) Russians.

== Notable people ==
- Ivan Calin (1935–2012), Moldovan agronomist, scholar and politician
