= Constantin Tampiza =

Moldovan economist and politician

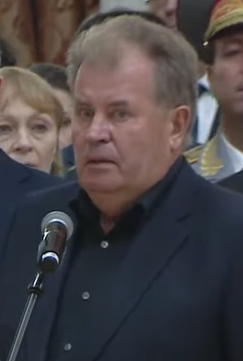
- Tampiza in 2023

1st Minister of Finance
- In office 27 August 1991 – 4 August 1992
- President: Mircea Snegur
- Prime Minister: Valeriu Muravschi
- Succeeded by: Claudia Melnic

1st Minister of Economy
- In office 6 June 1990 – 1 July 1992
- President: Mircea Snegur
- Prime Minister: Mircea Druc; Valeriu Muravschi
- Succeeded by: Sergiu Certan

Deputy Prime Minister of Moldova
- In office 27 August 1991 – 4 February 1992
- President: Mircea Snegur
- Prime Minister: Valeriu Muravschi

Deputy Prime Minister of SSR Moldova
- In office 6 June 1990 – 27 August 1991
- President: Mircea Snegur
- Prime Minister: Mircea Druc

Personal details
- Born: 21 December 1947 (age 78) Coștangalia, Moldavian SSR, Soviet Union
- Education: Technical University of Moldova

Constantin Tampiza (born 21 December 1947) is a Moldovan economist and former politician. He served as the 1st Minister of Finance and the 1st Minister of Economy of Moldova from 1990 to 1992.
