= Ananiv urban hromada =

Coordinates: 47°43′02″N 29°58′32″E

Ananiv urban hromada Ананьївська міська громада
- Hromada
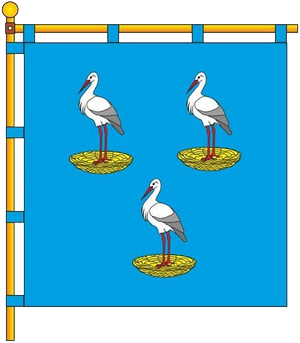
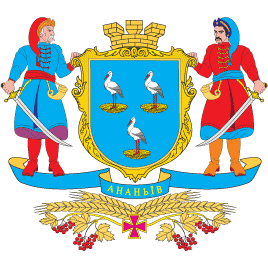
- Flag Coat of arms
- Interactive map of Ananiv urban hromada
- Country: Ukraine
- Oblast: Odesa Oblast
- Raion: Podilsk Raion
- Admin. center: Ananiv

Area
  - Total: 825.7 km^{2} (318.8 sq mi)

Population (2020)
  - Total: 22,391
  - Density: 27.12/km^{2} (70.23/sq mi)
- CATOTTG code: UA51120010000025020
- Settlements: 30
- Cities: 1
- Villages: 29

Ananiv urban hromada (Ukrainian: Ананьївська міська громада) is a hromada in Podilsk Raion of Odesa Oblast in southwestern Ukraine. Population: 22,391 (2020 est.)

The hromada consists of a city of Ananiv and 29 villages:

- Amury
- Ananiv (village)
- Baitaly
- Blahodatne
- Bondari
- Boyarka
- Handrabury
- Druzheliubivka
- Kalyny
- Kokhanivka
- Kokhivka
- Kozache
- Mykhailivka
- Novodachne
- Novoheorhiivka
- Novoivanivka
- Novooleksandrivka
- Novoselivka
- Pasytsely
- Romanivka
- Selyvanivka
- Shevchenkove
- Shelekhove
- Shymkove
- Strutynka
- Tochylove
- Velykoboyarka
- Verbove
- Zherebkove

== Demographics ==
As of the 2001 Ukrainian census, the administrative division had a population of 28,404 inhabitants. The native language composition was as follows:

2001 census
	percent
Ukrainian	79.0%
Moldovan	15.2%
Russian	5.4%
Armenian	0.1%
Bulgarian	0.1%
Belarusian	0.1%
others	0.1%

== Links ==
- https://decentralization.gov.ua/newgromada/4309
