= Alexandru Diordiță =

Moldavian politician

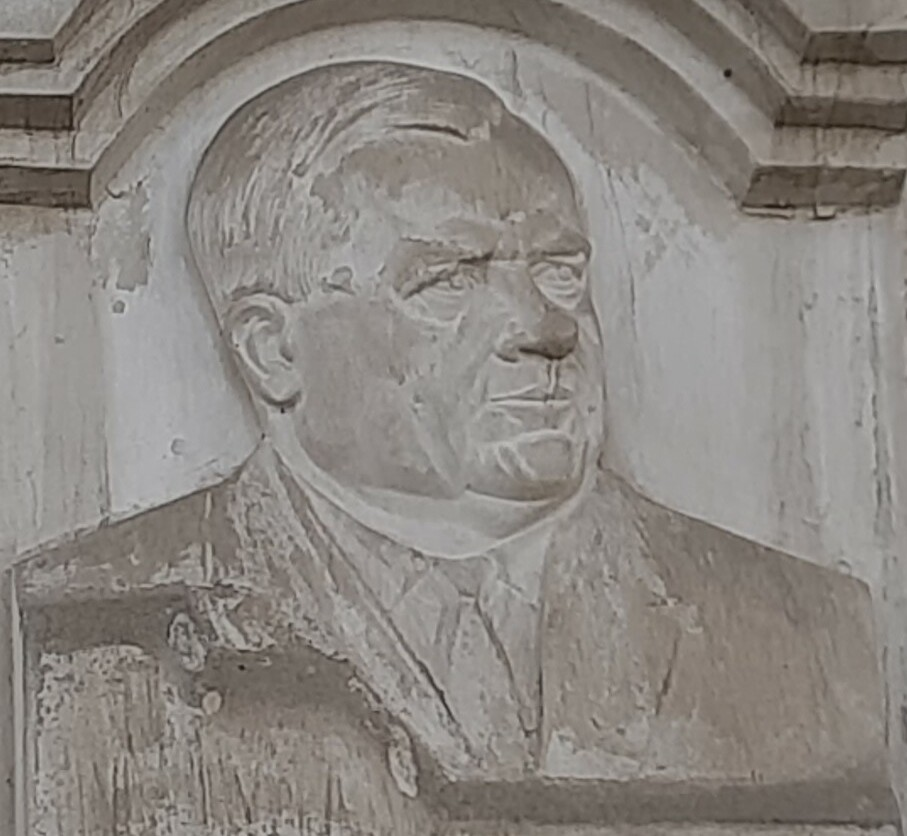
- Plaque of Diordiță in Chișinău

Chairman of the Council of Ministers of the Moldavian SSR
- In office 23 January 1958 – 15 April 1970
- Preceded by: Gherasim Rudi
- Succeeded by: Petru Pascari

Minister of Foreign Affairs of the Moldavian SSR
- In office 23 January 1958 – 15 April 1970
- Premier: Himselft
- Preceded by: Gherasim Rudi
- Succeeded by: Petru Pascari

Personal details
- Born: 13 September 1911 Handrabury, Russian Empire (now Ukraine)
- Died: 1 April 1996 (aged 84) Moscow, Russia
- Party: Communist Party of the Soviet Union (from 1938)

Alexandru Diordiță (Romanian: [ˈdjorditsə]; 13 September 1911 – 1 April 1996) was a Moldavian politician, who served as Chairman of the Council of Ministers of the Moldavian Soviet Socialist Republic (1958–1970).

== Biography ==
Alexandru Diordiță was born on 13 September 1911 in Handrabury (Romanian: Handrabura), Ananyevsky Uyezd. He died on 1 April 1996 in Moscow.

Since November 1933 he is deputy director of the State Department for Savings and Loans in Tiraspol. After a brief internship (January - November 1935) of studies in the administration of the financial departments organized in Odessa, he returned in November 1935 to Tiraspol in the position previously held.

In September 1936 he enrolled in the courses of the Leningrad Academy of Economic Studies, which he graduated in 1938 with the qualification of economist, specialist in finance.

In March 1938 he became a member of the Communist Party of the Soviet Union. Later he was appointed as head of the budget section (Narkomfin) within the People's Commissariat for Finance of Moldavian ASSR. Since September 1939 he heads the finance and trade section of the Soviet of the People's Commissars of Moldavian ASSR.

After the occupation of Bessarabia by the USSR, Alexandru Diordiță was appointed deputy commissioner of the people for finance of the Moldavian SSR. In August 1941 he was incorporated into the 161st Regiment of the USSR Marine, taking part in the battles for the defense of Odessa. After the occupation of Odessa by the Romanian-German armies, Diordiță is appointed deputy director of the Orenburg Economics Bank. He returned in March 1942 as deputy commissioner of the people for finance of the Moldavian SSR.

In July 1946 he was appointed Minister of Finance of the Moldavian SSR. In 1957 he graduated from the Moscow Superior Party School for the senior soviet officials.

Between 23 January 1958 and 15 April 1970, Alexandru Diordiță fulfilled the position of president of the Soviet of Ministers of the Moldavian SSR, being simultaneously minister of foreign affairs. During this period, he was also a member of the Bureau CC of the Communist Party of Moldavia.

Alexandru Diordiță was elected five times as a deputy in the Supreme Soviet of the USSR from 1954 to 1970.

Alexandru Diordiță was the prime minister of Moldavian SSR (23 January 1958 – 15 April 1970).

== Bibliography ==
- Enciclopedia sovietică moldovenească, 1970–1977

Political offices
Preceded by Gherasim Rudi	Chairman of the Council of Ministers of the Moldavian SSR; 23 January 1958 – 15 April 1970	Succeeded by Petru Pascari
