= Semion Grossu =

Moldovan politician and businessman

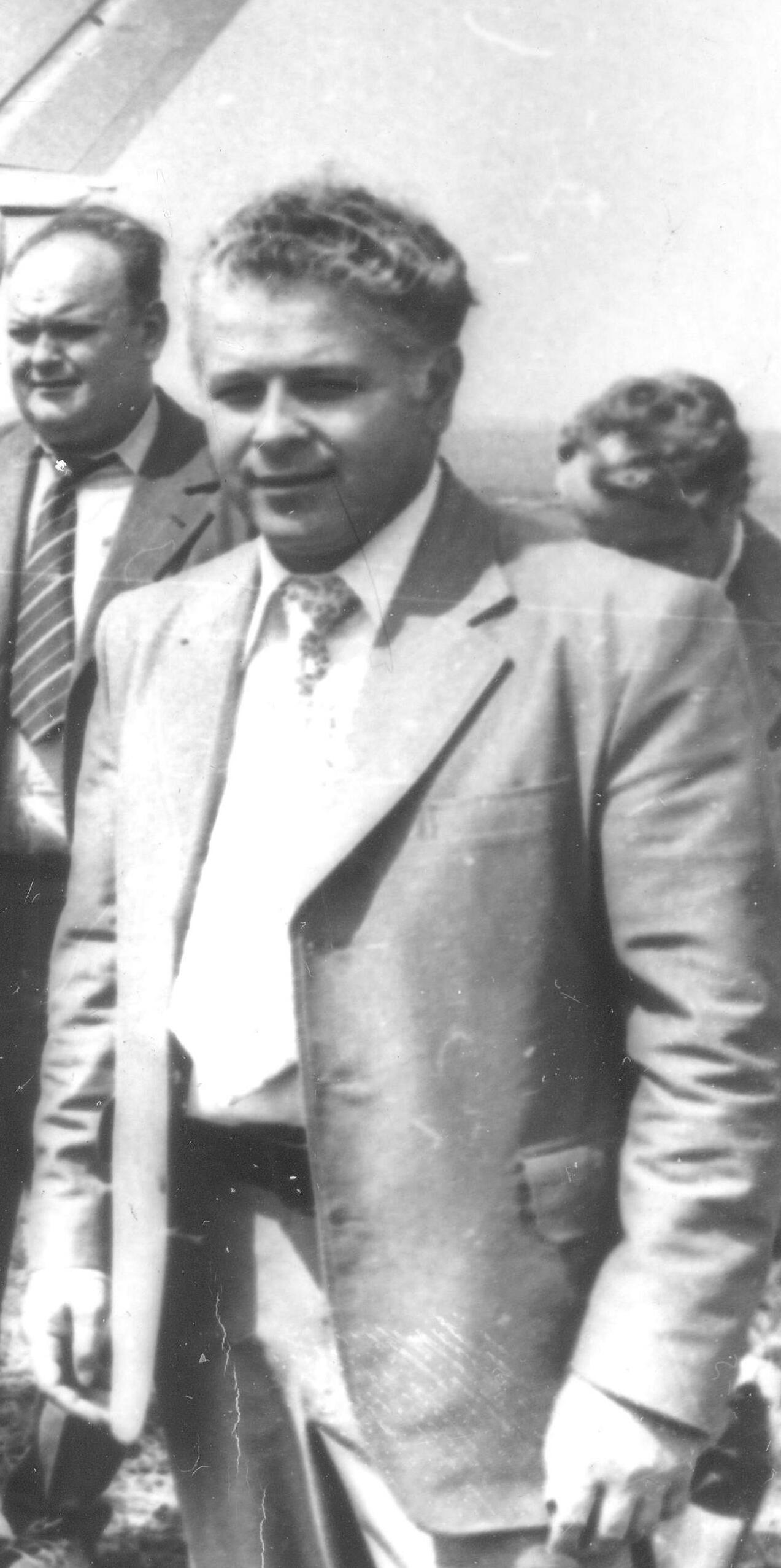
- Grossu in 1979

First Secretary of the Moldavian Communist Party
- In office 30 December 1980 – 16 November 1989
- Premier: Ion Ustian; Ivan Calin
- Preceded by: Ivan Bodiul
- Succeeded by: Petru Lucinschi

Chairman of the Council of Ministers of the Moldavian SSR
- In office 1 August 1976 – 30 December 1980
- Preceded by: Petru Pascari
- Succeeded by: Ion Ustian

Personal details
- Born: 18 March 1934 (age 92) Satu-Nou, Kingdom of Romania (now Novoselivka, Ukraine)
- Party: Communist Party of the Soviet Union (1961–1991)

Semion Grossu (born 18 March 1934) is a Moldovan politician.

== Biography ==
Grossu was born on 18 March 1934 in the commune of Satu-Nou, Cetatea Albă County, Kingdom of Romania (nowadays Novoselivka, Bilhorod-Dnistrovskyi Raion, Ukraine). In 1961, he joined the Communist Party of Moldavia.

Grossu was the chairman of government of the Moldavian Soviet Socialist Republic (1 August 1976 – 30 December 1980) and the Minister of Foreign Affairs of the Moldovan SSR (1 September 1976 – 31 December 1980). He later became First Secretary of the Communist Party of Moldavia (30 December 1980 – 16 November 1989). He was the final Moldavian SSR leader to espouse the Soviet party line; his successor, Petru Lucinschi, was identified with aspirations for Moldovan independence, which was finally achieved in 1991.

Although the first Soviet leader of Moldova to be fluent in Romanian, Grossu preferred to speak Russian in public during his tenures.

Since 1991, Semion Grossu has been the chairman of the Russo–Moldovan winemaking firm, Product Impex SRL. In a video posted on YouTube in 2009, filmed by the Moldovan news source Internet TV, Grossu said he did not consider himself a public figure.

== Sources ==
- Enciclopedia sovietică moldovenească (Chişinău, 1970–1977)

Party political offices
Preceded by Ivan Bodiul	First Secretary of the Moldavian Communist Party; 30 December 1980 – 16 November 1989	Succeeded by Petru Lucinschi
Political offices
Preceded by Petru Pascari	Chairman of the Council of Ministers of the Moldavian SSR; 1 August 1976 – 30 December 1980	Succeeded by Ion Ustian
