= Stroiești, Transnistria =

Stroiești Строенцы (Russian) Строїнці (Ukrainian)
- Village
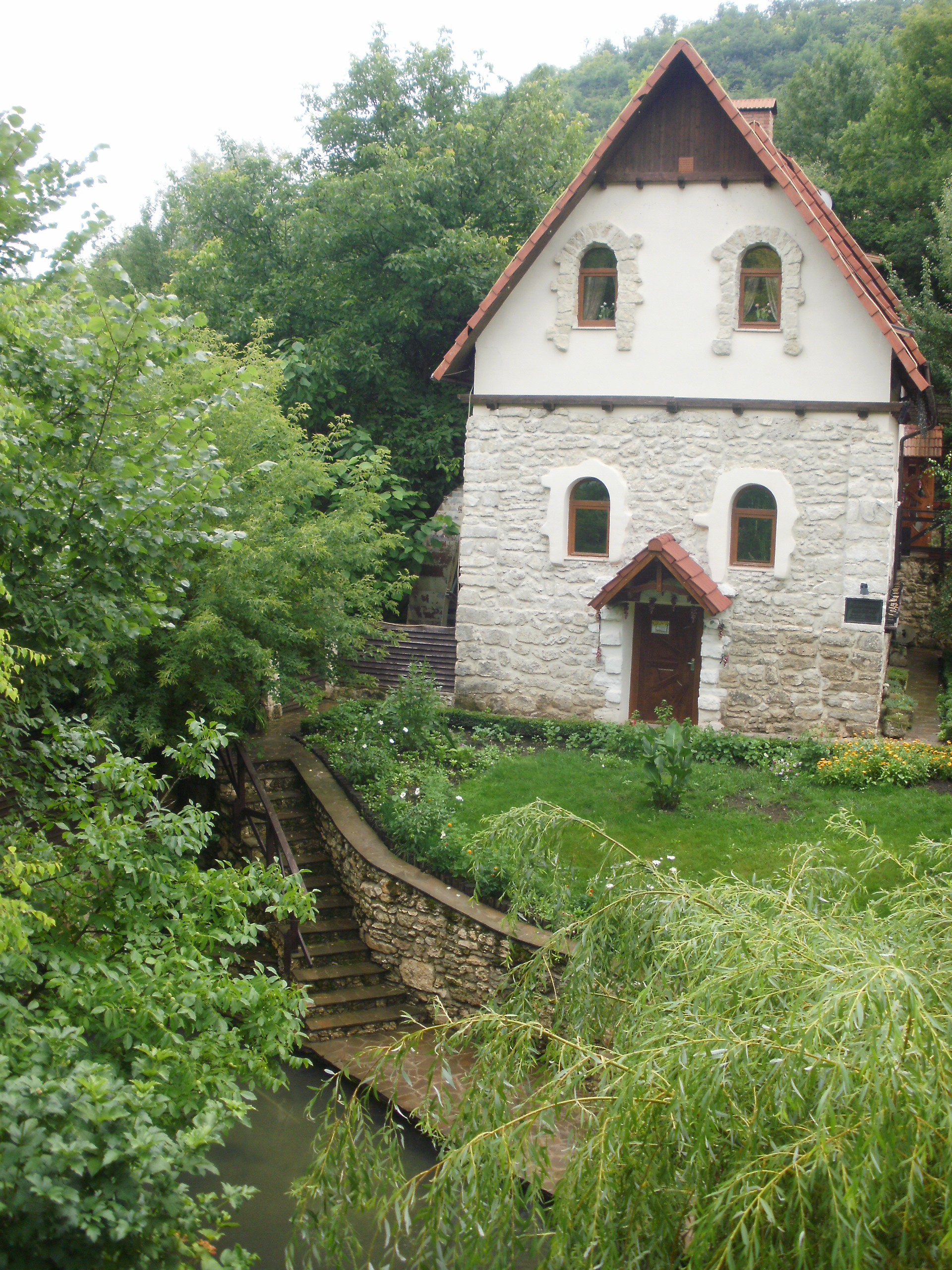

- Location within Moldova
- Coordinates: 47°53′19″N 28°56′11″E
- Country (de jure): Moldova
- Country (de facto): Transnistria (Note: Transnistria's political status is disputed. It considers itself to be an independent state, but this is not recognised by any UN member state. The Moldovan government and the international community consider Transnistria a part of Moldova's territory.)
- Elevation: 39 m (128 ft)
- Time zone: UTC+2 (EET)
  - Summer (DST): UTC+3 (EEST)

Stroiești (Ukrainian: Строїнці, romanized: Stroyintsi, Russian: Стро́енцы, romanized: Stroentsy, Polish: Stroińce) is a village in the Rîbnița District of Transnistria, Moldova, located midway between Rîbnița and Rașcov. It is the site of the Church of St. Michael the Archangel, an Orthodox church.

== History ==
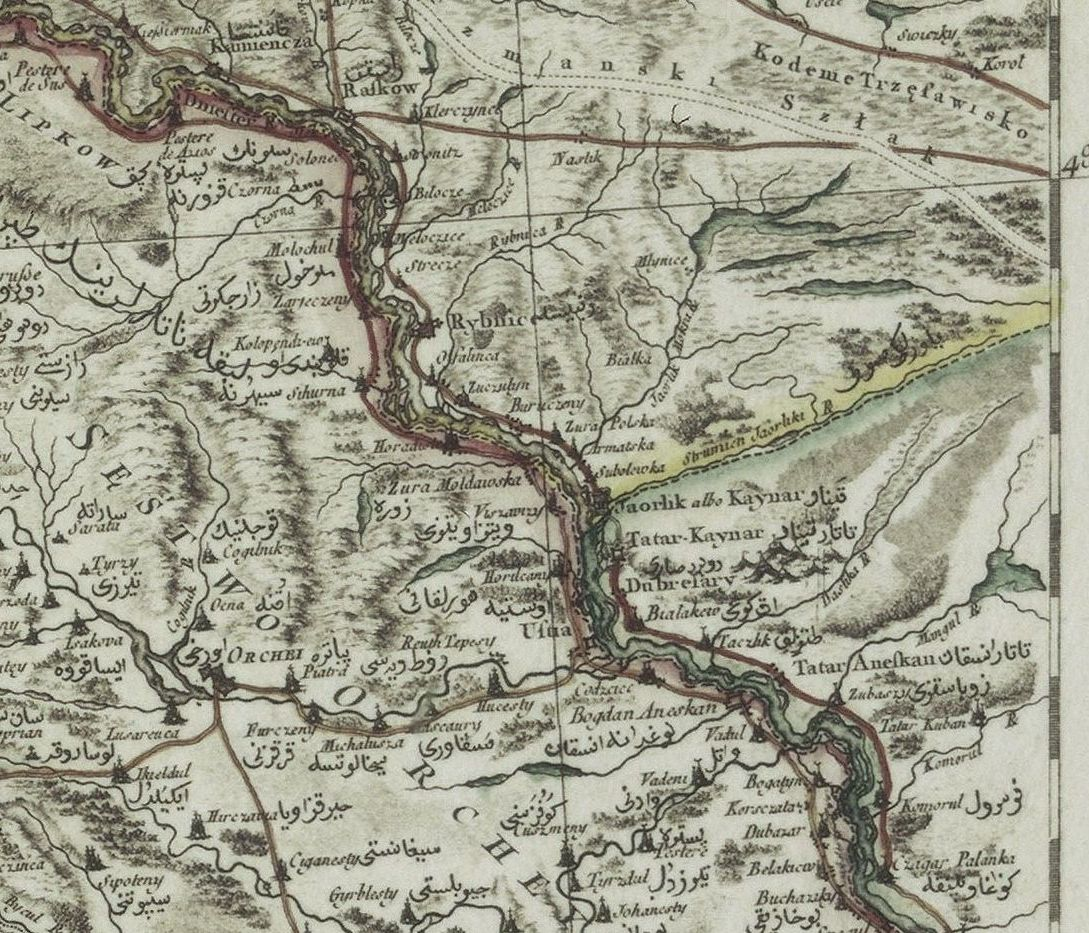
Fragment of a map of Poland from 1772 with Stronitz marked

Stroińce, as it was known in Polish, was a private village of the Lubomirski family, administratively located in the Bracław County in the Bracław Voivodeship in the Lesser Poland Province of the Kingdom of Poland. Following the Second Partition of Poland, it was annexed by Russia. In 1827 the Saint Michael church was built. In the late 19th century, the population was largely employed in shoemaking.

In 1924, it became part of the Moldavian Autonomous Oblast, which was soon converted into the Moldavian Autonomous Soviet Socialist Republic, and the Moldavian Soviet Socialist Republic in 1940 during World War II. From 1941 to 1944, it was administered by Romania as part of the Transnistria Governorate.

According to the 2004 census, the village's population was 689, of which 630 (91.43%) were Moldovans (Romanians), 35 (5.07%) Ukrainians and 17 (2.46%) Russians.
