= Handrabury =

Settlement in Odesa Oblast, Ukraine

Handrabury Гандрабури (Ukrainian) Handrabura (Romanian)
- Location in Ukraine Handrabury (Ukraine)
- Coordinates: 47°43′00″N 29°50′39″E
- Country: Ukraine
- Oblast: Odesa Oblast
- Raion: Podilsk Raion
- Hromada: Ananiv urban hromada

Population (2001)
  - Total: 2,744
- Postal code: 66428

Handrabury (Ukrainian: Гандрабури; Romanian: Handrabura) is a village in the Ananiv urban hromada, in Podilsk Raion, Odesa Oblast, Ukraine.

== Demographics ==
The village had 2,744 inhabitants in 2001. In the 2001 Ukrainian census, 2,580 (94.02%) people declared "Moldovan" (Romanian) as their mother language, 90 (3.28%) declared Ukrainian, 72 (2.62%) Russian and 2 (0.07%) other languages.

Native languages in Handrabury
	percent
Romanian	94.0%
Ukrainian	3.3%
Russian	2.6%
others	0.1%

== Notable people ==
- Alexei Barbăneagră (born 1945), Moldovan lawyer
- Efrem Barbăneagră (born 1941), Russian Orthodox Church bishop
- Alexandru Diordiță (1911–1996), Soviet Moldovan politician
