= Mircea Druc =

Prime Minister of SSR Moldova from 1990 to 1991

Mircea Druc OR
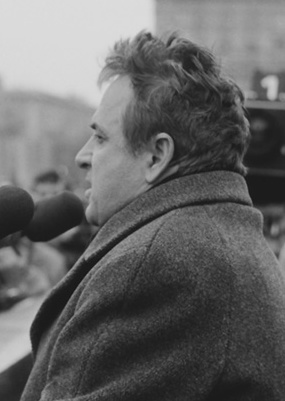
- Druc in 1991

Prime Minister of the Moldova SSR
- In office 26 May 1990 – 28 May 1991
- President: Mircea Snegur
- Deputy: Andrei Sangheli; Constantin Oboroc; Constantin Tampiza
- Preceded by: Petru Pascari (as Chairman of the Council of Ministers of the Moldavian SSR)
- Succeeded by: Valeriu Muravschi

Member of the Moldovan Parliament
- In office 17 April 1990 – 25 May 1990
- Parliamentary group: Popular Front
- Constituency: Strășeni

Personal details
- Born: 25 July 1941 (age 85) Pociumbăuți, Kingdom of Romania
- Citizenship: Moldova; Romania
- Party: Independent; Popular Front of Moldova

Mircea Druc (born 25 July 1941) is a Moldovan and Romanian politician who served as the Prime Minister of the Soviet Socialist Republic of Moldova from May 1990 to May 1991. Coming to power during the turbulent final years of the Soviet Union, his administration played a central role in Moldova’s early transition away from Soviet structures toward national independence and cultural alignment with Romania.

Born in Pociumbăuți (in present-day Rîșcani District, Moldova, then part of the Kingdom of Romania), Druc studied at universities in Leningrad, Moscow, and Chișinău. Unlike previous heads of government in Soviet Moldova, who were traditionally career apparatchiks vetted by the Communist Party, Druc emerged from the anti-communist civic and cultural movements of the late 1980s.

He became a prominent figure in the Popular Front of Moldova, a mass political movement advocating for democratic reforms, national sovereignty, and the cultural restoration of the majority Romanian-speaking population. Following the democratic mobilization of the 1990 Moldavian Supreme Soviet election, Druc was appointed Prime Minister on 26 May 1990. His investiture took place against a backdrop of deep legislative fractures, as conservative and Russophone factions frequently walked out to protest the Popular Front's political dominance.

== Tenure and challenges ==
Druc’s short-lived administration pursued systematic institutional reorientation, enacting sweeping reforms designed to reverse decades of Soviet legacy. While supporters championed these changes as vital cultural restoration, public discussions focused on navigating the transition and addressing local concerns.

- Cultural and Educational Shifts: The government transitioned the state education system away from the Russian-centric Soviet model, expanding Romanian-language instruction within the framework of the 1989 language laws, which restored the Latin alphabet. Traditional state symbols were reintroduced, and street names reflecting Soviet ideology were changed to reflect the historical Romanian heritage of Moldova.
- Civil Service and Institutional Changes: The cabinet moved to replace Soviet-era administrative structures and personnel and to establish a legal framework for sovereignty. Proponents argued these changes were needed to modernize public institutions and restore national rights. Conversely, the conservative opposition, which included hardline Communists, Interfront networks, and regional leaders in Gagauzia and Transnistria, opposed the reforms, arguing that the institutional overhauls and language policy threatened minority populations. The resulting friction became a catalyst for regional separatism, which Moscow supported.
- Macroeconomic Pressures: Druc’s government operated amid the broader systemic collapse of the Soviet command economy, suffering from disrupted supply chains and severe macroeconomic instability. While the cabinet struggled to implement effective economic reforms without an independent national currency or sovereign financial framework, mounting inflation and economic hardship fueled widespread public dissatisfaction and weakened his administration's domestic standing.

== Dismissal and Subsequent Career ==
By mid-1991, political tensions had escalated significantly. Amid growing economic crisis, regional fragmentation, and friction with more moderate state leaders (such as President Mircea Snegur), Druc was ousted on 22 May 1991 following an overwhelming vote of no confidence in Parliament. His removal marked a turning point, paving the way for more pragmatic, centrist coalitions under his successor, Valeriu Muravschi.

Following his dismissal, Druc faced political fallout, including scrutiny over financial dealings during his tenure and sharp criticism from minority representatives and political adversaries who contended that his administration's policies alienated non-Romanian-speaking populations and deepened ethnic polarization.

After Moldova's declaration of independence in August 1991, Druc eventually settled in Romania, where he obtained Romanian citizenship, and has been a vocal advocate of the unification of Moldova and Romania. Emphasizing grassroots integration over political rhetoric, he was quoted as saying: "Make 100 joint ventures on both banks of the Prut with mixed capital, make 10,000 mixed marriages, and do not talk about unification, but unite; do not talk about love, love one another!"

He ran as an independent candidate with a single-issue platform centered on unification during the 1992 Romanian presidential election, receiving 326,866 votes (2.75%).

Druc subsequently worked for the Ministry of Foreign Affairs of Romania between 2001 and 2004. In 2004, he was briefly a member of the nationalist Greater Romania Party (PRM), contesting a seat for Botoșani County in the November parliamentary election, but was unsuccessful. He later took up a role at the Chamber of Commerce and Industry of Romania, engaging in transborder cooperation projects involving Romania, Moldova, and Ukraine.

In the 2008 Romanian parliamentary election, Druc stood as a candidate of the Democratic Liberal Party (PDL) in a Suceava County constituency, once again failing to secure a mandate.

== Electoral history ==
=== Romanian Presidential elections ===
Election	Affiliation	First round			Second round		
Election	Affiliation	Votes	Percentage	Position	Votes	Percentage	Position
1992	Independent	362,866	2.75%	5th			

Political offices
Preceded by Petru Pascari	Prime Minister of the Moldavian SSR; 1990–1991	Succeeded by Valeriu Muravschi
