= Valeriu Muravschi =

First prime minister of Moldova

Valeriu Muravschi OR
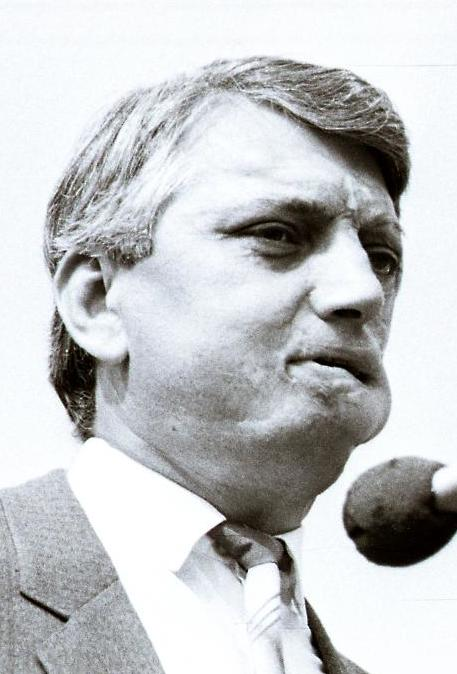
- Muravschi in 1991

1st Prime Minister of Moldova
- In office 27 August 1991 – 1 July 1992
- President: Mircea Snegur
- Deputy: See list: Constantin Oboroc Ion Ciubuc Andrei Sangheli Constantin Tampiza Valeriu Cebotari Gheorghe Efros
- Succeeded by: Andrei Sangheli

Prime Minister of the Moldovan SSR
- In office 28 May 1991 – 27 August 1991
- President: Mircea Snegur
- Preceded by: Mircea Druc

Member of the Moldovan Parliament
- In office 9 April 1998 – 13 March 2001
- Parliamentary group: For a Democratic and Prosperous Moldova Electoral Bloc

Minister of Finance
- In office 6 June 1990 – 28 May 1991
- President: Mircea Snegur
- Prime Minister: Mircea Druc
- Preceded by: Adrian Budeanu
- Succeeded by: Constantin Tampiza

Personal details
- Born: 31 July 1949 Sirota, Moldavian SSR, Soviet Union
- Died: 8 April 2020 (aged 70) Chișinău, Moldova
- Party: Popular Front of Moldova
- Education: Technical University of Moldova

Valeriu Muravschi (31 July 1949 – 8 April 2020) was a Moldovan politician and businessman who served as the first prime minister of Moldova between 28 May 1991 and 1 July 1992.

== Early life and career ==
Muravschi was born in Sirota, Orhei District on 31 July 1949. He was burned at a young age along with his brother, Sergiu, and required surgery. He graduated from the Faculty of Economics at the "Sergei Lazo" Polytechnic Institute in Chișinău.

Following his graduation, Muravschi had a series of jobs in various economic ministries for the Moldavian SSR: he was a senior economist at the State Committee for Prices from 1971 until 1976, chief of the Pricing Section of the Ministry of Building Materials Industry from 1976 until 1984, head of the Department of Finance from 1984 until 1988, and finally director of the Directorate from 1988 to 1990. He then entered Mircea Druc's cabinet and held the posts of Deputy Prime Minister and Minister of Finance from 1990 until 1991. He was appointed Prime Minister on 28 May 1991.

== Premiership ==
Muravschi's term as Prime Minister was dominated by the Transnistria War.

== Post-premiership ==
In 1999, Muravschi founded the National Christian Democratic Peasants Party of Moldova (PNCD) and was president of that party until 2002. It subsequently merged into the Liberal Party (PL) and then the Our Moldova Alliance (AMN) in 2003.

On 31 July 1999, for "long and fruitful activity in the state, contributing to the socio-economic development of the republic and high professionalism", Muravschi was awarded the Order of Work Merit.

== Death ==
Muravschi suffered from cancer and was taken to the hospital in Chișinău in late March 2020. He underwent surgery; though the surgery was successful, his condition deteriorated and he fell into a coma. He died on April 8, 2020, at age 70.

Political offices
Preceded by Mircea Druc	Prime Minister of Moldova; 1991–1992	Succeeded by Andrei Sangheli
