= Television in Moldova =

Television in Moldova was introduced in 1958.

From 2022 it became illegal to retransmit television and radio programmes with informative, analytical, military, or political content, produced in states that have not ratified the European Convention regulation on cross-border television.

The following is a list of television channels broadcast in Moldova.

== National ==
- Moldova 1 (state owned) – 1st national network
- Moldova 2 (state owned) – 2nd national network

Only available in Transnistria:

- Transnistria 1 is the only channel in Transnistria transmitting programmes in Russian, Ukrainian and Moldovan (in Cyrillic).

== Regional ==
- ProTV Chișinău (national), retransmits programmes of Pro TV (Romania)
- Super TV (semi-national), retransmits programmes of SET (Russia)
- TVR Moldova (national), retransmits programmes of the Romanian Television channels
- TV8 (Moldova) (Chișinău and Bălți)
- Realitatea TV (semi-national)
- Prima TV Moldova (national), retransmits programmes of Prima TV (Romania)
- Prima Sport Moldova (national), retransmits programmes of Prima Sport (Romania)
- Cinemaraton Moldova (national), retransmits programmes of Cinemaraton (Romania)

Only available in Transnistria:

- TSV (TV channel) (Transnistria)

== Local ==
- Albasat TV (Nisporeni), retransmits programmes of Jurnal TV
- Euronova TV (Ungheni), retransmits programmes of Jurnal TV

== Cable and digital terrestrial channels ==
- Alt TV
- Jurnal TV (owned by Victor Topa)
- Noroc TV

== Defunct ==
- Muz-TV Moldova (semi-national), retransmitted programmes of Muz-TV (Russia)
- TV Moldova Internațional (state owned)
- Prime retransmitted programmes of Channel One (ORT) (Russia) (owned by Vladimir Plahotniuc¹) (managed by General Media Group SRL - controlled by Vladimir Plahotniuc¹)
- Canal 3 (semi-national) (managed by Telestar media SRL - controlled by Vladimir Plahotniuc¹)
- Publika TV (semi-national) (managed by General Media Group SRL - controlled by Vladimir Plahotniuc¹)
- ITV Moldova
- Orhei TV
- Orizont TV
- First in Moldova
- RTR Moldova, used to retransmit programmes of Russia-1 (Russia) (part owned by Sberbank)
- NTV Moldova, used to retransmit programmes of NTV (Russia) (managed by Exclusiv Media Company, owned by Corneliu Furculiță)
- RU TV Moldova, used to retransmit programmes of RU.TV (Russia)
- TV6

== See also ==
- Media of Moldova
- TeleRadio-Moldova
- List of Romanian-language television channels
- Television in Transnistria
- Euronova Media Group
