= Internet in Moldova =

Internet in Moldova is one of the fastest and least expensive in the world. The country ranks 3rd in the world by gigabit coverage with around 90% of the population having the option to subscribe to a gigabit plan. The overall infrastructure is well developed which allows many users to experience good quality services throughout the country. However, despite high speeds and cheap prices, the penetration level is quite low when compared with many EU or CIS countries. In 2018, 49% of Moldovan households had broadband access. In 2015, there were 80 registered Internet service providers (ISPs) in the country, with the majority being local or regional with only a few offering their services throughout the country. Moldtelecom and StarNet are the country's leading providers sharing around 88% of the market. The remaining 12% are shared between other ISPS, like SunCommunications, Arax Communications and others. Almost all ISPs that offer their services across the country have their headquarters located in the capital-city of Chişinău.

Moldtelecom is the only ISP that offers its services throughout the country on a wide scale, StarNet follows offering its services in several large towns and regional centers. Other ISPs are limited to their town or region.

Since 2008 all carriers offer 3G HSDPA Internet access throughout the country. While Moldtelecom and StarNet are major players on the "wired Internet access" market, Orange Moldova and Moldcell are major players on "mobile Internet access" market.

After the War of Transnistria in early 1990s, the Transnistrian self-proclaimed government denied access of operation for many Moldavian-based companies on its territory, including telecommunications companies. As such, the only major ISPs in that area are local IDC or Interdnestrcom (Интерднестрком) and LinkService, both operating only on Transnistrian territory.

The country's top-level domain is .md.

== Legal and regulatory frameworks ==
In order to meet requirements for WTO and the EU accession, the telecommunications market has been liberalized and no exclusive rights remain. Moldtelecom—the incumbent telecom operator—decreased its tariffs, allowing other providers into the market. However, low computer penetration rates and inconsistent government policy remain major impediments to Internet growth.

The state has officially committed to developing Moldova as an information society, although many of its policies undermine this objective. Moldtelecom, which is also the major national ISP, remains under state control despite large-scale criticism and four failed privatization attempts. Moldtelecom also controls Unite, one of the four mobile operators created in 2007. At present, ISPs are forced to rent access from Moldtelecom's well-developed infrastructure, a necessity which increases their costs and diminishes their competitiveness. Moldtelecom provides the nondiscriminatory Reference Interconnection Offer, the last version having been approved by the regulator after much delay in December 2007. Even though some interconnection agreements are now agreed between the incumbent and IP and data transmission operators, some new entrants have complained about insufficient access to Moldtelecom's network leading to inefficient usage of infrastructure. In April 2009, the Moldovan regulator introduced new guidelines on interconnection tariffs. The regulation addresses the issues of obligations imposed on operators, with emphasis on transparency and nondiscriminatory stances toward competitors. It remains to be seen in practice how the new guideline will be applied by Moldtelecom.

The Ministry of Information Development is the main policymaker in the field of information and communications and was drafting new Policy Strategy 2009–2011. The ministry's objective is to implement the National Strategy and Program on establishing e- Moldova.

The main law regulating the Internet is the 2007 Law on Electronic Communication. The law established the National Agency for Telecommunications and Information Regulation (NATIR) as the telecommunications regulator in Moldova. This law mandates the government to harmonize national legislation with European standards. The law is intended to give NATIR full autonomy over the sector and replaces the licensing regime. ISPs can now start operating immediately after notifying NATIR.

This agency is responsible for monitoring ISPs’ compliance with the law and keeping the Public Register of Electronic Communications Network and Service Providers. The law specifically provides for the possibility of introducing anticompetitive restrictions on service providers. The agency can demand that ISPs provide additional accounting information, can make them change to cost-oriented tariffs, and can introduce other measures in order to stimulate efficient market competition; and NATIR also regulates the management of the country's highest-level Internet domain (.md). The National Security Doctrine of Moldova as of 1995 did not include the Internet. The Supreme Security Council (SSC), which oversees implementation of the president's decrees related to national security, monitors ministries’ and state agencies’ various activities to ensure national security. The Ministry of Information Development carries out government policies related to information and communications and encourages collaboration between state and private organizations. The Moldovan legislation does not provide for comprehensive regulation of information security. Rather, the National Security and Information Service is endowed with broad authority to monitor and gather information on Internet usage and data transmission related to national security issues. In July 2008, a Moldovan court ordered the seizure of the PCs of 12 young Internet users for posting critical comments online against the governing party. The suspects were accused of illegally inciting people to overthrow the constitutional order and threaten the stability and territorial integrity of the Republic of Moldova. It is unknown how the authorities obtained the names of the people, but some suggest that an ISP provided them with the IP addresses of the users.

Even though Moldova is one of the poorest countries in Europe, Internet and cell phones are used extensively by opposition and civil society groups to organize protests and voice their opinion. After the parliamentary elections on April 5, 2009, thousands of Moldovans attempted to gather in Chişinău's main square to protest the results. The protesters set the Parliament and president's offices on fire, images of which were broadcast around the world. As the guarantees for press freedom are still weak, Moldovan state television continued to show regular TV programming rather than broadcasting events occurring in the capital. The authorities disconnected cell phone coverage in the main square. More than 10,000 Moldovans joined in on Twitter (some with GPRS technology on their mobiles) to share their opinions and spread the news of Chişinău's political protests. The authorities attempted to shut down a number of Web sites for a few days, demonstrating a resolute hand in dealing with protesters.

This incident, like others that have transpired in the region (e.g., the Ukrainian Orange Revolution), reveals the growing role of the social media in Eastern Europe as a tool for organizing protests and diffusing them online. At the same time, it creates the concern that governments in the region, aware of the increasing importance of social media, might attempt to close down free speech outlets anytime they feel threatened.

== Access Technologies and ISPs ==
=== Moldova ===
xDSL

- Moldtelecom is the national telecommunications company and is the main xDSL provider in the county. It is the only ISP that offers its services countrywide. Fees are different depending where the subscriber is located - subscribers located in cities and regional centers will have faster connection and pay less compared to those living in small towns and rural areas.

Cable

- SunCommunications and later Orange were the only ISP's in Moldova that offered Internet connection via Cable. The service was available in Chişinău, Bălţi and Cahul but was discontinued in the early 2020s in favor of FTTx.

FTTx

- StarNet is the pioneer of this technology in Moldova. It was the first ISP that began offering Internet connection via FTTx. The service is available in all large towns and cities.
- Moldtelecom started offering Internet connection via FTTx in 2008. The service is available in all large towns and cities.
- ARAX is the first company in Moldova to offer triple-play (broadband Internet access, fixed telephony and digital TV) via own FTTx network. The service is available only in Chişinău.

Dial-up

- Dial-Up is available throughout the country and is provided by Moldtelecom under the brand name "Internet Total"

Wi-Fi

- Orange has the largest metropolitan Wi-Fi network in the country. Coverage area includes mass transit areas and bus stops in many large towns and cities. Network access is limited to Orange subscribers only.
- StarNet has the second largest metropolitan Wi-Fi network in the country. Coverage area includes most of the Chişinău's central streets and residential districts as well as parks and other public and recreational places. Company offers paid and free access to its network, free access has limitations on time of use.

Aside from StarNet and Orange there are many other local free Wi-Fi networks hosted by café's, shops and fast food restaurants. Free municipal Wi-Fi is also available in Chişinău's trolleybuses

Mobile

- Orange is the largest mobile carrier in the country. The company offers mobile Internet access via 3G/HSPA and LTE networks with download speeds up to 42 Mbit/s for HSDPA and 300 Mbit/s for LTE. Coverage area includes most of the country with HSDPA, LTE coverage is limited to large towns and cities.
- Moldcell is the second largest mobile carrier in the country. The company offers mobile Internet access via 3G/HSPA and LTE networks with download speeds up to 42 Mbit/s for HSDPA and 150 Mbit/s for LTE. Coverage area includes most of the country with HSDPA, LTE coverage is limited to large towns and cities.
- Moldtelecom (formerly Unité) is the third largest mobile carrier in the country. The company offers mobile Internet access via 3G/HSPA and LTE networks with download speeds up to 42 Mbit/s for HSDPA and 175 Mbit/s for LTE. Coverage area includes most of the country with HSDPA, LTE coverage is limited to Chişinău and Bălţi.

=== Transnistria ===
xDSL

- Interdnestrcom is a regional telecommunications company and is the main xDSL provider in Transnistria. It is the only ISP that offers its services throughout the region.

FTTx

- LinkService was the first ISP in Transnistria to start offering FTTx services in 2005. The service is mostly limited to the city of Bender, with some limited availability in Tiraspol.
- Interdnestrcom started offering FTTx services in 2011. The service is available in all large towns and cities in the region.

Dial-Up

- Interdnestrcom used to provide dial-up access on Transnistrian territory, but on 10 January 2011, the company officially discontinued support of this technology.

Wi-Fi

- Interdnestrcom has the largest metropolitan Wi-Fi network in the region. Coverage area includes public and recreational places in all large towns and cities. Company offers paid and free access to its network, free access has limitations on access speed.

Mobile

- Interdnestrcom is the largest mobile carrier in Transnistria. The company offers mobile Internet access via EVDO Rev.A and LTE networks, with download speeds up to 3.1 Mbit/s for EVDO and 100 Mbit/s for LTE. Coverage area includes most of the Transnistrian territory (IDC does not cover official Moldova), with LTE being limited to large towns and cities.

=== ISPs by category ===
Provider	xDSL	FTTx	Mobile	Connection Speed (maximum)	
Provider	xDSL	FTTx	Mobile	Download	Upload
Moldova
Moldtelecom	+	+^{50G-PON}	+^{5G NSA}	50Gbit/s	50Gbit/s
StarNet	-	+^{XGS-PON}	-	10Gbit/s	10Gbit/s
Arax	+	+^{XGS-PON}	-	10Gbit/s	10Gbit/s
Orange	-	+^{XGS-PON}	+^{5G NSA}	10Gbit/s	10Gbit/s
Moldcell	-	+^{GPON}	+^{5G NSA}	800Mbit/s	800Mbit/s
Transnistria
IDC	+	+^{GPON}	+^{LTE}	1Gbit/s	1Gbit/s

The "maximum Download/Upload" means maximum external DL/UL speed for the most expensive package available for home subscribers, not business.

== Statistics ==
At the end of 2015, there were 534,400 wired broadband subscribers and 298,400 mobile subscribers, most of them are from Chişinău. In 2004, there were 183 Internet cafés registered in Chişinău alone, however as personal computers and Internet access became much cheaper over the years the number of registered Internet cafés has significantly decreased to the point where it would be very difficult to find one now. Since 2010, many providers have started offering unlimited 100 Mbit/s plans, the average price for a 100 Mbit/s plan is around MDL200 or €9. In 2015, there were 80 registered ISPs in the country. Average download speed throughout the country is estimated to be around 40 Mbit/s according to Ookla Net Metrics.
The table below shows the number of Broadband subscribers and penetration level per 100inh. in Moldova (excluding Transnistria). Statistical data is provided by ITU and ANRCETI.

Year	Wired Broadband Subscriptions	Penetration	Mobile Broadband Users	Penetration	Internet Users
2005	~10,400	0.3%	no data	no data	14.63%
2010	~269,100	7.5%	~121,600	3.4%	32.3%
2015	~534,400	18.8%	~1,760,100	61.9%	no data
2020	~719,000	27.2%	~2,371,100	89.8%	no data

* Starting from 2015 penetration levels are counted based on "Usual Resident Population" rather than "General Resident Population" as recommended by National Bureau of Statistics.
* Statistical data may change as new data becomes available !

=== Moldovan Internet in graphics ===
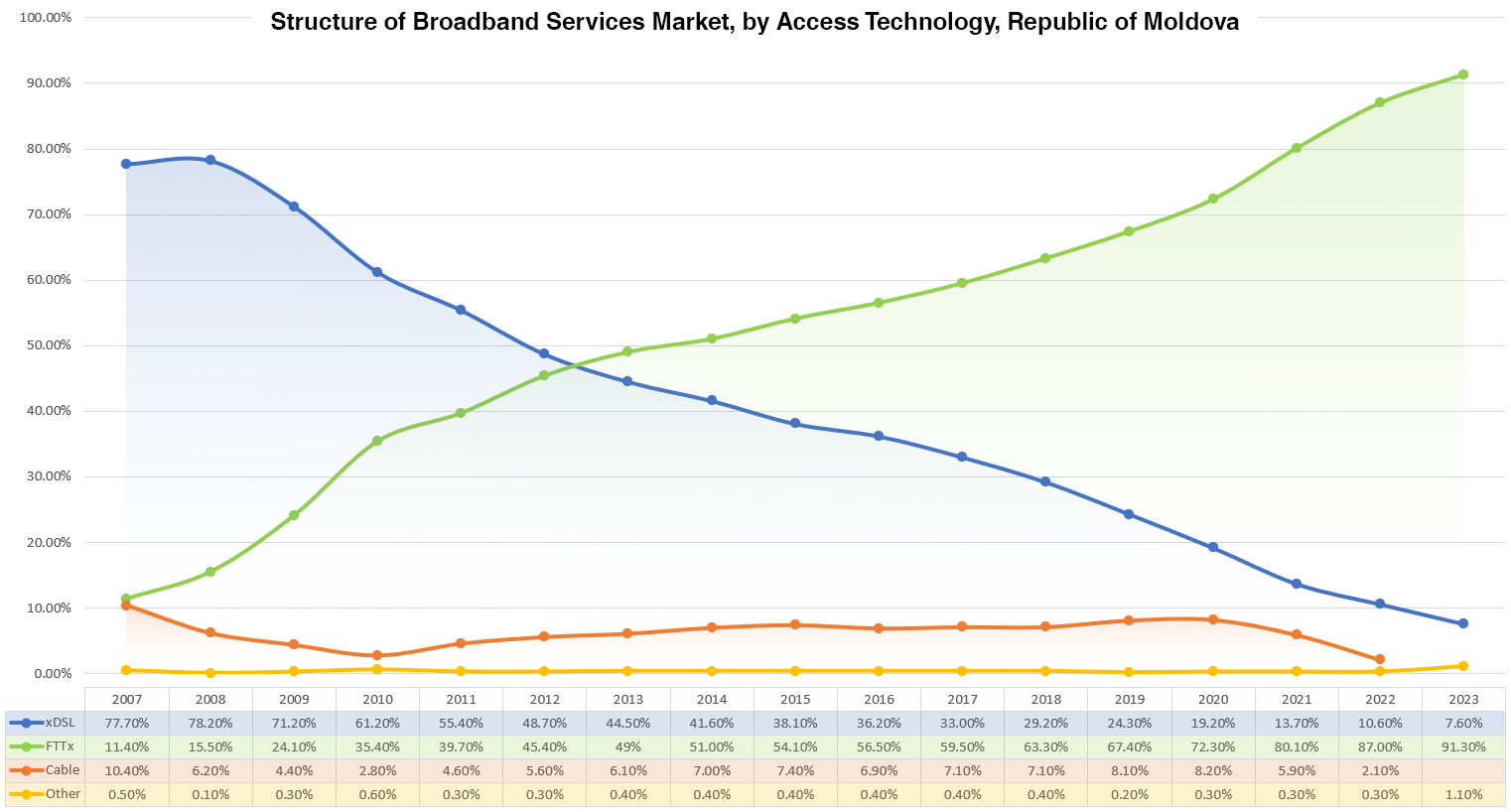
Structure of Wired Broadband Services Market, by Access Technology.

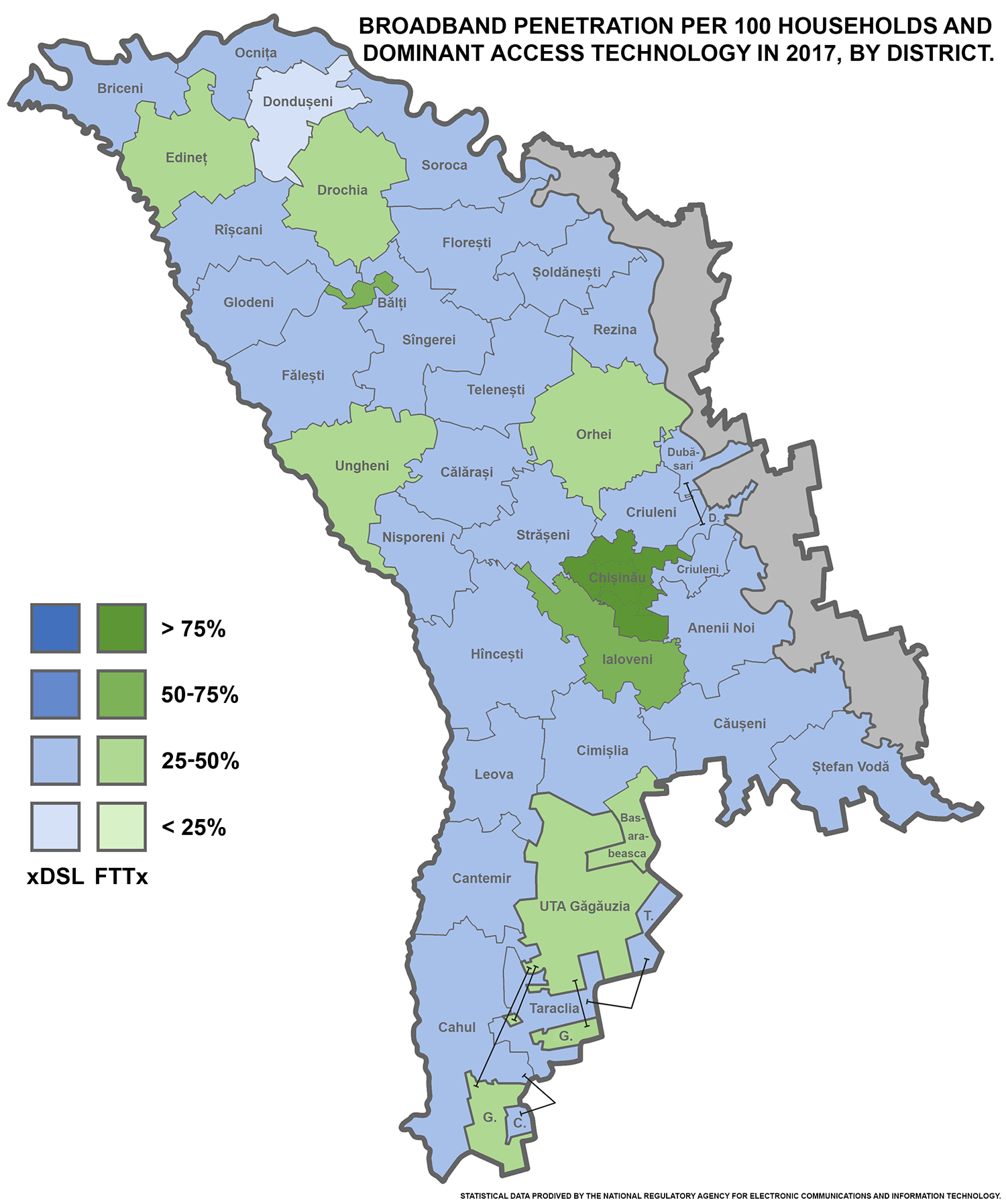
Broadband Penetration per 100 Households and Dominant Access Technology, by District.

Allocation of IPv4 Address Space in Moldova.

Allocation of IPv6 Address Space in Moldova.

== History ==
- 1991 – Registration of domain moldova.su
- 1992 – "Relsoft" - the first ISP in Moldova is born.
- 1994 – Registration of domain .md.
- 1995 – First ISPs "CRI" and "Relsoft Communications" start offering online Internet access.
- 1996 - First satellite link that connects local universities is established, with the help from Soros Foundation. First FTTx line between Chişinău and Bucharest is constructed.
- 1998 - DNT Association expands the existing network created by Soros Foundation to provide Internet access to schools and universities. Moldtelecom starts offering ISP services. Commercial wing of DNT is registered under the brand name - "Globnet".
- 1999 - Arax starts offering ISP services.
- 2000 - Interdnestrcom starts offering dial-up services in Transnistria.
- 2001 - On April 1, Moldtelecom starts offering dial-up services.
- 2002 - Globnet starts offering ADSL services. The number of Internet users in Moldova reaches 100,000.
- 2003 - StarNet is born. Redelegation of .md top-level domain
- 2004 - On November 1, Moldtelecom starts offering ADSL services under the brand name - "MaxDSL". SunCommunications starts offering Internet services via cable under the brand name - "SunInternet".
- 2005 - The number of Internet users in Moldova reaches 500,000.
- 2006 - StarNet begins construction of its own FTTx network in Chișinău.
- 2007 - Interdnestrcom starts offering ADSL services under the brand name - "OK". StarNet starts offering FTTx services. ARAX starts offering FTTx services under the brand name - "SETI".
- 2008 - On April 16, Moldtelecom starts offering FTTx services under the brand name - "MaxFiber". Moldcell and Orange launch their 3G networks.
- 2009 - The number of Internet users in Moldova reaches 1,000,000.
- 2010 - On April 1, Moldtelecom Unité launches its own 3G network. First LTE test by Orange in July. On December 1, StarNet becomes the first ISP in Moldova to introduce fully unlimited 100/100 Mbit plan. On December 10, Interdnestrcom officially discontinues support of dial-up.
- 2011 - On March 25, Arax introduces its own 100/100 Mbit unlimited plan. On April 1, Moldtelecom introduces its own 100/100 Mbit unlimited plan, thus becoming the 4th ISP to do so after StarNet, NordLinks and Arax. Interdnestrcom starts offering FTTx services.
- 2012 - On March 5, Moldtelecom becomes the first ISP in Moldova to start offering speeds above 100 Mbit. On April 21, Interdnestrcom becomes the first carrier in the country to launch a commercial LTE network. On November 20, Orange became the second carrier in the country and, officially, the first in Moldova to successfully launch a commercial LTE network. On December 24, Moldcell became the third carrier in the country to successfully launch a commercial LTE network.
- 2013 - On April 1, Unité successfully launched its own HSPA+ network. FTTx becomes the dominant Internet access technology in the country.
- 2014 - Moldtelecom becomes the first ISP in the country to start offering gigabit speeds.
- 2015 - On October 22, Moldtelecom's Unité became the last carrier to launch a commercial LTE network.
- 2016 - On October 19, Orange Moldova acquired 100% of the share capital of SunCommunications for an undisclosed amount, after approval by the National Competition Council.
- 2024 - On April 23, Moldcell launched a limited public test of 5G NSA (limited to specific devices/manufacturers as well as several areas in central parts of Chisinau; the service has since been expanded and fully launched across the country), thus becoming the first carrier in the country to do so. On June 20, Orange Moldova launched a limited public test of 5G NSA (limited to a few select Orange stores and locations in Chisinau; the service has since been expanded and fully launched across the country)
- 2025 - On April 8th, Orange Moldova became the first ISP in the country to start offering XGS-PON services with speeds up to 10Gbit/s.
- 2026 - On May 4th, Moldtelecom launched its own 5G NSA network thus becoming the third carrier in the country to do so. On May 28th, Moldtelecom became the first ISP in the country to start offering 50G-PON services with speeds up to 50Gbit/s.

== Surveillance and filtering ==
The National Security and Information Service is authorized to monitor the Internet and collect any information necessary to prevent infringements of the laws. Surveillance in Moldova is permitted only after obtaining a court order. There is no special legal act providing for Internet surveillance per se. Nevertheless, surveillance may effectively be carried out on the provider level or at companies. The Parliament is deliberating on legislative proposals, including changes to the Law on Operative-Investigative Activities and the Law on Telecommunications that would allow government agencies to carry out surveillance on telephone and electronic communications. The law is still under consideration, but if it is approved, it is expected that it might follow the Russian Law on Surveillance (SORM).

Moldova has established two departments responsible for overseeing the activities of participants in the ICT sector. The first structure, within the Ministry of Internal Affairs, is charged with prevention of interregional and informational infringements. The other body, within the Center on Prevention of Economic Crimes and Corruption, has special powers to prevent infringements in the IT and other fields.

Moldova also possesses a comprehensive centralized database of information on all its citizens. This system, called "registru" (registry), has been heavily criticized by human rights groups for being too comprehensive and lacking oversight. Privacy rights are poorly developed in Moldova, and not yet defined in law. The information held by the registru is extremely comprehensive and brings together data collected by all state agencies. Consequently, human rights groups fear that it represents unwarranted and unprecedented surveillance. The system has proven highly successful, and it is a model for governments in the CIS. It has been exported to several other countries in the region. The current Moldovan president, a former internal ministry general, supports the registru—in part because it was originally developed within the Ministry of Internal Affairs.

In 2007 and 2008, the OpenNet Initiative carried out testing on three first-tier ISPs in Moldova: Moldtelecom, Telemedia and DNT SunCommunications. Results did not reveal any filtering carried out on the Internet backbone. In Internet cafés, access is limited more by surveillance than by direct filtering. Specific content is prohibited, and, if it is accessed, the user is fined. Approximately 56% of Internet cafés’ administrators surveyed by ONI admitted to filtering and surveillance activities in 2006. Other administrators stated that they noted that some Web sites were inaccessible, but would not confirm that they used any specific filtering system in the Internet cafés.

== See also ==
- Telecommunications in Moldova
- Media of Moldova
