= Telecommunications in Moldova =

Telecommunications in Moldova are maintained at a relatively high performance level. Because Moldova is a small country, telecommunications companies managed to achieve good coverage in both wired and wireless communications infrastructure. Landline is available in most settlements, however mobile phone popularity has vastly increased in recent years. Mobile communications infrastructures are fairly well developed but suffer from high prices, nonetheless the amount of mobile subscriptions is growing very fast compared to the landline. As far as the Internet is concerned, Moldova has one of the best wired Internet connections in the world as well as one of the cheapest in $ per Mbit.

== Landline ==
After the break of the Soviet Union Moldova's telecommunications facilities were in a very poor condition. In 1990 Moldova had an average of 11 telephones per 100 inhabitants and there were more than 200,000 unfilled orders for telephone installations. The situation didn't progress much as only around 24,000 new lines were installed by 1994. Only after 1995 the state owned Moldtelecom began to upgrade their lines and stations. When in 1999 Moldtelecom became a JSC the company began a rapid upgrade process of all of their equipment and installations across the country. In 2000 around 440,000 new lines were installed and the overall power of telephone stations was increased to 645,000 numbers, at that time the average number of telephones per 100 inh. was around 16. The upgrade process to digital has also sped up and in 2008 around 83% of all stations were digital, for example in 1993 only 4% of all stations were digital. Currently all stations in the country are digital and the number of installed lines is 1,171,300 with around 33 telephones per 100 inh. In recent years however the general trend was the decrease in total number of landline subscriptions, after reaching its peak of 1,222,400 subscriptions in Q1 2014.
Currently Moldtelecom is the dominant provider in this industry holding around 89% of the market share, the rest are shared between some ISP's who provide triple play options to their customers, however most if not all of them rent lines from Moldtelecom.
Until recently an open dialing plan was used but as of April 1, 2012 Moldova has implemented a closed dialing plan on all of its territory.

Landline Subscriptions and Penetration level. (2020)

- ▼ Number of Landline Subscriptions - 1,027,689
- Penetration Level - 38.9%

Market Structure by Number of Users. (2020)

- Moldtelecom - 89.5%
- Other Providers - 10.5%

*Statistics do not include data from Transnistria.

== Mobile telephony ==
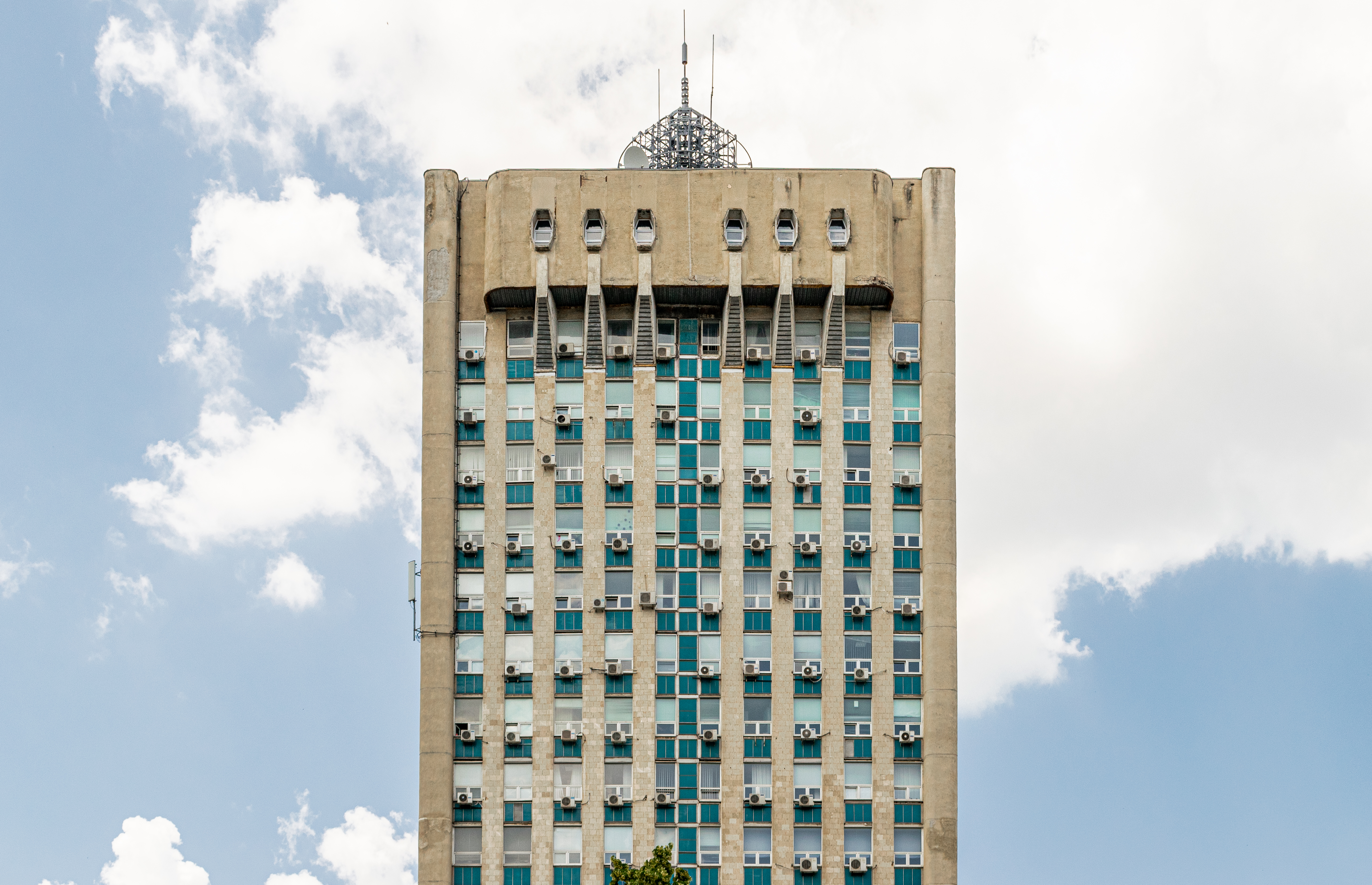
Moldtelecom headquarters, Chișinău

The mobile telephone market of Moldova is divided between two GSM carriers - Orange Moldova and Moldcell, and two CDMA carriers - Unité and Interdnestrcom. Orange Moldova launched its network in October 1998 under the brand of Voxtel and was the first and only carrier at the time. In April 2000 TeliaSonera entered the market with its own network under the brand of Moldcell and thus became the second carrier in the country. Moldtelecom became the third carrier when it launched its own network in March 2007 under the brand of Unité. In December 2007 another carrier named Eventis entered the market but three previous carriers have already saturated it so much that on February 5, 2010 Eventis declared bankruptcy and shut down its network.
After the War of Transnistria in early 1990s Transnistrian government denied access of operation for many Moldavian based companies on its territory including telecommunications companies. As such the only major carrier on its territory is Interdnestrcom or IDC who began its operation in 1998.
Unlike Internet market the state of the mobile market in the country is very poor, while coverage is not really an issue all carriers practice archaic methods that carriers in many developed countries have long since abolished, general prices are very high compared to other CIS and even EU countries with no change in this segment in many years in fact in some cases the prices have even increased, mobile Internet access is in no better condition with very high prices and very low monthly caps compared to extremely well developed and cheap wired Internet access.
The first millionth subscription was registered in September 2005 since then the number of subscriptions has quadrupled and now amounts to around 4,323,500 which is almost 25% more than the estimated population of the country (without Transnistria), this means that the penetration level has exceeded 100%.
In October 2008 Moldcell became the first carrier in Moldova to launch a 3G network, currently, all carriers provide 3G services throughout the country. In September 2009 Moldova became the first country in the world to launch high-definition voice services (HD voice) for mobile phones, and the first country in Europe to launch 14.4 Mbit/s mobile broadband at a national scale, with over 40% population coverage. On April 26, 2012, Interdnestrcom becomes the first carrier in the country to launch a commercial LTE network. On November 20, 2012, Orange became the second carrier in the country and first in official Moldova to successfully launch commercial LTE network. On December 24, 2012, Moldcell became the third carrier in the country to successfully launch a commercial LTE network. On October 22, 2015, Unité became the last carrier to launch a commercial LTE network.

Mobile Subscriptions and Penetration level. (2020)

- ▼ Total Number of Mobile Subscriptions - 4,108,207
- ▼ Number of Active Mobile Subscriptions - 3,420,383
- Penetration Level of Active Users - 129.5%

Market Structure by Number of Users. (2020)

- ▼ Orange Moldova - 55.7%
- ▼ Moldcell - 33.1%
- ▲ Moldtelecom (Unité) - 11.2%

*Statistics do not include data from Transnistria.

== Internet ==
Moldova has one of the best wired Internet connections in the world as well as one of the cheapest in terms of $ per Mbit. The overall infrastructure is well developed which allows many users to experience good quality services throughout the country. However, despite high speed availability and cheap prices the penetration level is quite low compared to many EU or CIS countries. At the end of 2015 there were 80 registered ISP's in the country with the majority being local or regional only with only few offering their services throughout the country. Moldtelecom and StarNet are country's leading providers sharing around 86% of the market. The remaining 14% are shared between other ISP's like SunCommunications, Arax Communications and others. All ISP's that offer their services across the country have their headquarters located in the capital city of Chişinău.
Moldtelecom is the only ISP that offers its services throughout the country on a wide scale, StarNet follows offering its services in several large towns and regional centers. Other ISP's are limited to their town or region.
Since 2008 all mobile carriers offer 3G HSDPA Internet access throughout the country. LTE is also available in Chişinău and select regions and is provided by all carriers. While Moldtelecom and StarNet are major players on the "wired Internet access" market, Orange Moldova, Moldcell and Unité are major players on "mobile Internet access" market. However, because the general state of the mobile market in the country is rather poor the gap between prices and quality for wired and mobile Internet is extremely high.
After the War of Transnistria in early 1990s Transnistrian government denied access of operation for many Moldavian based companies on its territory including telecommunications companies. As such the only major ISP's in that area are local IDC or Interdnestrcom (Интерднестрком) and LinkService, both operate only on Transnistrian territory.
The most popular wired Internet access technology is FTTx with about 83.8% of fixed broadband subscribers as of mid-2022, xDSL comes second with about 12%. Average download speed throughout the country is estimated to be around 120 Mbit/s according to Ookla Net Metrics. In Chişinău and some regional centers speeds as high as 1 Gbit/s are easily available through FTTx.

Number of Broadband Subscriptions. (2020)

- Wired:
  - ▲ Number of Wired Subscriptions - 719,001
  - Penetration level - 27.2%
- Mobile:
  - ▼ Number of Mobile Subscriptions - 2,371,108
  - Penetration level - 89.8%

Structure of Wired Broadband Service Market, by Access Technology. (2020)

- ▲FTTx - 72.3%
- ▼ xDSL - 19.2%
- ▲ Cable - 8.2%
- ▼ Other - 0.3%

Top Level Domain: MD

*Statistics do not include data from Transnistria.

Internet hosting service

Moldova has numerous internet hosting services:

- Alexhost (Alexhost S.R.L)
- AvenaCloud (Infotech-Grup S.R.L)
- MangoHost (IT FRUIT S.R.L)
- HOST.md (Molddata Î.S)

== Television ==
Television industry in Moldova began in 1956 with the construction of the country's first dedicated television tower in Chişinău which took a little over a year to complete, the finished tower was 196 meters tall and could broadcast within a 60 km radius. The first television transmission was sent on 30 April 1958 at 19:00 and included amongst other things cheers from all the parties that participated in the project's development as well as some local celebrities.

At first programs were broadcast only two times a week on Friday and Sunday but by the end of 1958 broadcasts became daily. The first live broadcast in the country also happened in 1958.

In 1961 the coverage area was expanded after several relay masts were constructed in Bălți, Cahul and Comrat. Since 1974 all broadcasts were made in color and in 1977 the first dedicated television studio was built which is still in use to this day. In the early 1980s there were more than a million citizens with access to television sets. During the Soviet era there weren't all that many channels available with most of them being news and general purpose channels which were all state owned. The industry didn't really change much and only after the fall of the USSR was when the television industry in the country really started to gain momentum. One of the first cable companies to begin their operation in the country was EuroCable which began its operation shortly after the collapse of the Soviet Union, the company offered cable television to its customers with multiple local and foreign channels. EuroCable remained the dominant cable television provider until the mid 1990s when it was bought by SunCommunications which merged it with its own service and re-branded it into SunTV. Because EuroCable and later SunTV began very early they gathered a large subscription base and remain the dominant cable television provider to this day offering their services in several large towns in the country, although this might soon change as Moldtelecom is rapidly gaining momentum. During the 2000s many other Chişinău based cable television providers such as Satellit, Delta and Alfa emerged offering similar services as SunTV. In 2015 there were 83 registered television providers. In 2007 Arax Communications launched its own cable television network called Zebra TV which became the first digital network in the country, SunTV followed launching its own digital network later that year. Until recently accessing television was only possible via cable but in 2011 StarNet and Moldtelecom launched their separate IPTV services in Chişinău and other towns offering multiple channels in both SD and HD qualities. Local broadcasting has remained fairly undeveloped since the time it was first launched although progress towards better quality is quite rapid with most local channels hoping to go fully digital in the near future.

Subscriptions and Penetration level. (2020)

- ▲ Number of multichannel TV subscriptions - 360,932
- Household Penetration level - 41.0%

Structure of multichannel TV subscriptions, by reception technology. (2020)

- ▲IPTV - 58.4%
- ▼ Cable - 41.6%

of which:

- ▲ Digital - 78.9%
- ▼ Analog - 21.1%

*Statistics do not include data from Transnistria.

== Printed media ==
The main daily newspaper in the republic, Moldova Suverană, is published by the government. Sfatul Țării is published by Parliament, which also publishes the daily Nezavisimaya Moldova in Russian. Other principal newspapers include Rabochiy Tiraspol' (in Russian, the main newspaper of the Slavs in Transnistria), Ţara, Tineretul Moldovei/Molodezh Moldovy (in Romanian and Russian), and Viaţa satului (published by the government).

The main cultural publication in Moldova is the weekly journal Literatura şi arta, published by the Union of Writers of Moldova. Other principal periodicals include Basarabia (also published by the Writers' Union), Chipăruş, Alunelul, Femeia Moldovei, Lanterna Magică, Moldova, Noi, and SudEst.

Kishinëvskiye novosti, Kodry, and Russkoye Slovo are Russian-language periodicals. Other minority-language periodicals include Prosvita and Homin in Ukrainian, Ana sözu and Cîrlangaci in Gagauz, Rodno slovo in Bulgarian, and Undzer kol/Nash golos in Yiddish and Russian. In all, 240 newspapers (ninety-seven in Romanian) and sixty-eight magazines (thirty-five in Romanian) were being published in the republic in 1990. Basa Press, an independent news service, was established in November 1992.

== General Information ==
- Fixed telephony subscriptions - 1,143,900 (2017)
- Fixed telephony penetration - 32.2% (2017)
- Mobile telephony subscriptions - 4,460,000 (2017)
- Mobile telephony penetration - 125.6% (2017)
- Wired Broadband subscriptions - 584,300 (2017)
- Wired Broadband penetration - 16.5% (2017)
- Mobile Broadband subscriptions - 2,430,078 (2017)
- Mobile Broadband penetration - 68,4% (2017)
- Internet hosts - 711,564 (2012)
- Internet Service Providers (ISP's) - 80 (2015)
- Country code (Top level domain) - MD

== See also ==
- Internet in Moldova
