= Scoreni =

- Village
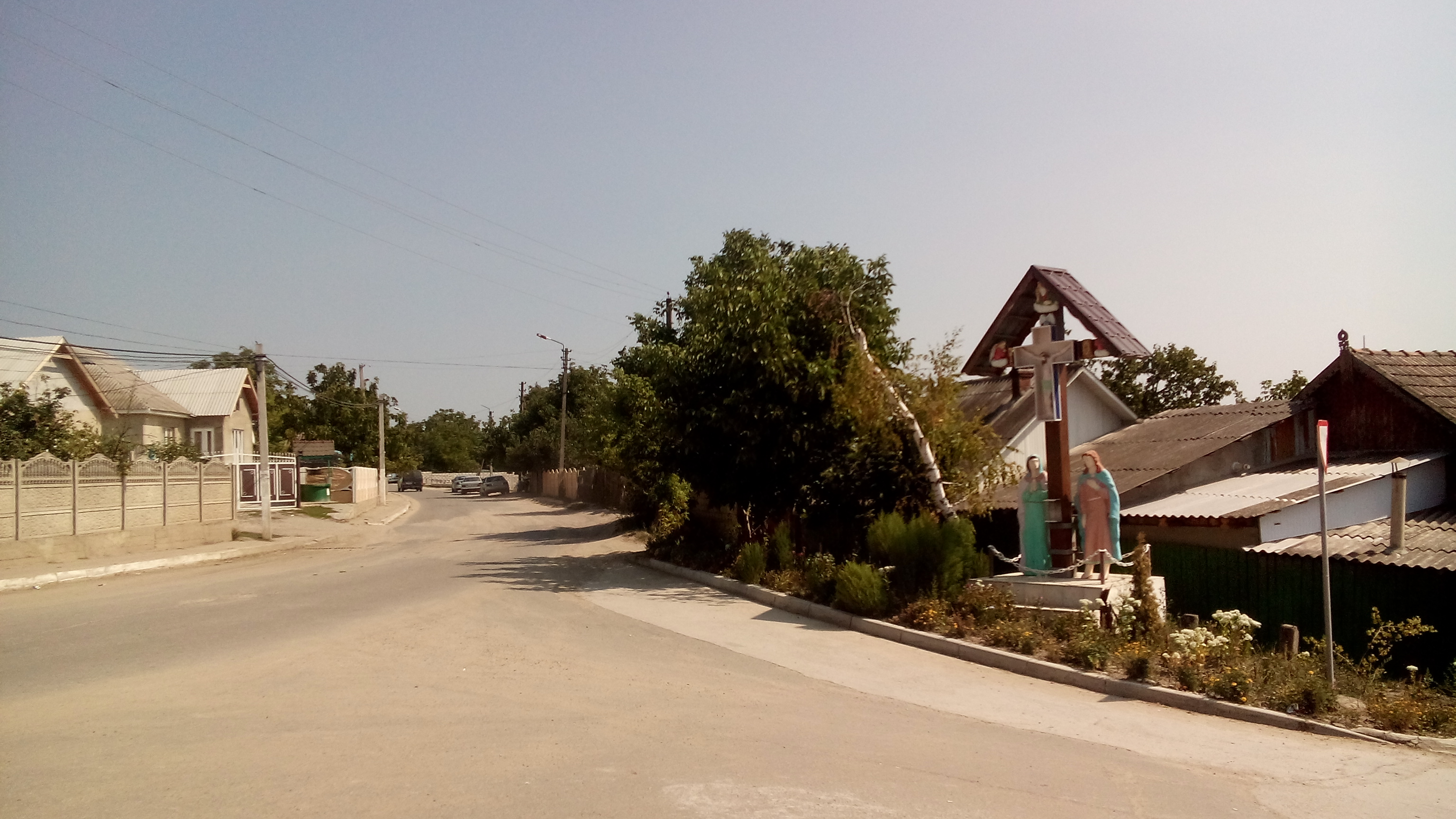

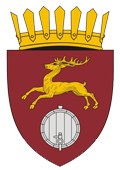
- Coat of arms

- Location within Moldova
- Coordinates: 47°04′02″N 28°36′32″E
- Country: Moldova
- District: Strășeni District

Government
  - Mayor: Svetlana Tabacari (BEPPEM)

Population (2014 census)
  - Total: 3,647
- Time zone: UTC+2 (EET)
  - Summer (DST): UTC+3 (EEST)
- Postal code: 3730
- Website: http://scoreni.md

Scoreni is a village located in Strășeni District, Moldova. It neighbors the following communities: Cojușna, Căpriana, from Strășeni, Condrița, Trușeni, suburbs of Chișinău County (Chișinău), and Strășeni. Scoreni is famous because of its well-developed barrel crafting industry. Scoreni is known as a good starting point for hiking excursions because it is surrounded by woods and various other landscape features.

== Public institutions ==
The "Universul" public school serves the village exclusively and is attended by over 500 children; around 30 teachers teach there. The school was built in the late 1980s and is still in a good condition, lately benefiting from European funds for complete renovation and installation of a natural gas heating system. The village has 8 shops, a drugstore, a day-care and a consulting clinic, all built in the late 1980s. The city hall is located in an old Soviet-type building in the center of the village, 50 meters north-west from the school, on the main street.

== Roads & Infrastructure ==
There are 3 way to access the village which are regularly used by the local residents, two main roads and a dirt road used only during summer. The main road which connects the village with the town of Straseni is a macadam style paved road. This road is relatively well maintained and is one of the two main access to the village.

The second road connects the village to E581 highway was completed in the fall of 2014. The new road connects the village with the nearby village of Malcoci.

The village is connected to the national natural gas network, electricity, land and mobile telephone networks. The internet connection is available at the moment only via DSL provided by Moldtelecom or using 3G provided by Orange Moldova and Moldcell. The water infrastructure is only partially developed and covers only the south-eastern quarter of the village. Most households have constructed water wells for water provisioning.
