= Gheorghi Agadjanean =

Moldavian film director

- Born: 24 June 1986; Chişinău
- Education: Academy of Music, Theater and Fine Arts
- Parent(s): Rafael Agadjanean and Elena Jignea

Gheorghi Agadjanean (Russian: Агаджанян Георгий Рафаэльевич) (born 24 june 1986 in Chișinău, MSSR) is a Moldovan film director and producer, and a member of the Union of Cinematographers of Moldova.

== Biography ==
Agadjanean comes from a family of filmmakers; his father Rafael Agadjanean is a screenwriter and his mother Elena Jignea an animation movie director, He has spent most of his childhood years on the film set. He graduated in 2007 from the Arts Academy of Moldova where he studied in its TV/Film Faculty.

== Career ==
In 2006, Agadjanean made a documentary titled Сан Саныч (San Sanîci), for which he was received an award in 2007 from the Moldovan Union of Filmmakers for best directorial debut and the film was selected for a number of international film festivals. The film won the Best Moldovan Film at the international film festival "Cronograf; and the CEI prize at the Trieste (Italy) film festival. It was also selected for the main program of festivals in Leipzig (Germany), Cottbus (Germany), Vukovar (Croatia), Jihlava (the Czech Republic), Paris (France), the international festival for human rights in Kyiv (Ukraine), and multiple other international film festivals.

In 2010 Agadjanean was one of the 15 directors that participated at the documentary film project "15 Young by Young" (Arte France/Avantis Latvia). The concept of the project was to "represent the destiny of the former soviet republics – 20 years after the break-up of the USSR". The premier of the project took place at the Berlin International Film Festival (Berlinare), being also broadcast by the TV channel “Arte”. The work of Mr. Agadjanean at this project (Sasha and walls) was the first Moldovan documentary to be shown on French and German TV channel Arte.

Agadjanean joined the Publika TV team (the first news channel in Moldova) in 2010.

Agadjanean has been the showrunner of one with the highest-rated projects in the history of the Moldovan television – Deal or No Deal (Endemol franchise), as well as the showrunner of the morning TV show in Moldova – Prima Oră. Additionally, he oversaw the production and promotion of the comedy show – Made in Moldova, its sketches getting millions of hits on various social media channels.

In 2016, in parallel with his content creation and management responsibilities, Agadjanean took on the leadership role of the GMG Marketing & Promo Department where he manage the promotion of holding's TV channels on the media and advertisement market.

== Filmography ==
- Square N10 (2004)
- Afro-Moldavians (2005)
- German Tracks in Moldavia (2005)
- The Tuberculosis is Curable (2006)
- San Sanych (2006)
- A country of fairy tales (2009)
- Sasha and His Walls (2010) Avantis/Allegria

== Awards ==
- 2007 Prize of union of filmmakers of Moldova for best director’s debut
- 2008 Prize for best Moldavian film, Cronograf International Film Festival
- 2008 Central European Institute Premio, Trieste Film Festival
- Participant of different film festivals – Berlinare, Cottbus, Leipzig, Paris, Vukovar, Kyiv, Cluj-Napoca, Yerevan, Chișinău.

== See also ==
- Media of Moldova
- Cinema of Moldova
