= Valeriu Saharneanu =

Moldovan journalist

Valeriu Saharneanu OR
- Born: 3 August 1952 (age 73); Cuizăuca, Moldavian SSR, Soviet Union
- Other names: Valeriu (Vladimir) Saharneanu
- Education: Moldova State University
- Occupation: Journalist
- Employer: Euronova Media Group
- Known for: head of the Union of Journalists of Moldova
- Spouse: Maria Bulat-Saharneanu
- Children: Ciprian, Domniţa (b. 1985)

Valeriu Saharneanu (born 3 August 1952) is a journalist from the Republic of Moldova. He has been the head of the Union of Journalists of Moldova since 1994.

== Biography ==
Valeriu (Vladimir) Saharneanu was born on 3 August 1952 in Cuizăuca, Rezina District, where he completed his elementary studies (1959–1969). He has a degree in philology from the Journalism Department at Moldova's State University, and from the Journalism Department at the Superior School of Political Science in Sankt-Petersburg. He attended the Moldova State University (1970–1975) and the Faculty of Journalism of the Saint Petersburg State University (1987–1989). He attended also courses in Romania (1993), Berlin (1995), Brussels (1996), Paris (1998), Thessaloniki (1999), Strasbourg (2002), Cairo (2004), Norway (2005), the United States (2006).

He worked as editor (1975–1987), deputy editor in chief (1989–1991), editor in chief (1991–1994) at TeleRadio-Moldova. During the 1994 parliamentary election, Saharneanu was attacked at the entrance of the building where he lived and was sick for three months. Soon, he lost his job at TeleRadio-Moldova and his wife, Maria Bulat-Saharneanu, lost her job at "Femeia Moldovei" magazine.

Saharneanu is co-founder and director of Euronova Media Group (the Vocea Basarabiei radio station, TV Euronova, and TV Albasat). In 2001, Saharneanu founded Gazeta Românească [The Romanian Gazette], a weekly magazine sold in Moldova that compiled articles from major Romanian media outlets. The project failed primarily because of financial reasons.

He has been the head of the Union of Journalists of Moldova (Romanian: Uniunea Jurnaliştilor din Moldova) since 1994. On 25 January 2004, at a meeting of an opposition party in Chişinău, officials restricted journalistic activities. As president of the Moldovan Journalists Union, Saharneanu gave a speech at the meeting on the necessity to defend media independence and freedoms. He was summoned by the police and charged with disturbing the public order. A date for his trial was immediately established.

In 2005, Saharneanu was a founding member of the Democratic Forum of Romanians in Moldova (Romanian: Forumul Democrat al Românilor din Republica Moldova).

In January 2010, as many as 14 people put forward their candidacies for the post of chairman of TeleRadio-Moldova, of whom Constantin Marin got five votes, journalist Valentina Ursu three and Saharneanu, one vote.

== Awards ==
- Order of the Republic (2009)
- Ordinul României "Order for Merit", grad Comandor (2000)
- "Om Emerit" (1991)
- "Jurnalist emerit al Republicii Moldova" (1991)

== See also ==
- Vocea Basarabiei
