= Veaceslav Țâbuleac =

- Born: Chişinău
- Education: Moldova State University
- Occupation: Journalist
- Employer: Euronova Media Group
- Known for: head Vocea Basarabiei
- Awards: Order of Honor (Moldova)

Veaceslav Țâbuleac is a journalist from the Republic of Moldova. Veaceslav Țâbuleac and Valeriu Saharneanu were the founders of the radio station Vocea Basarabiei and Euronova Media Group.

== Awards ==
- Veaceslav Tibuleac received "Ordinul de Onoare" (Order of Honor) for substantial contribution to freedom of speech in Moldova, as stated in Mihai Ghimpu's decree.

== See also ==
- Vocea Basarabiei
