= Mass media in Moldova =

The mass media in Moldova refers to mass media outlets based in the Republic of Moldova. Television, magazines, and newspapers are all operated by both state-owned and for-profit corporations which depend on advertising, subscription, and other sales-related revenues. The Constitution of Moldova guarantees freedom of speech. As a country in transition, Moldova's media system is under transformation.

For the situation in the separatist republic of Transnistria, see Media of Transnistria.

== History ==
240 newspapers (ninety-seven in Romanian) and sixty-eight magazines (thirty-five in Romanian) were being published in the republic in 1990. Basa Press, an independent news service, was established in November 1992.

The media in Moldova has passed through hard times during the ruling period of the Party of Communists (2001-2009), during which the media continued being seen as an instrument of political influence, as in Soviet times. Only few media outlets were able to preserve their independence, due to the "lack of democratic traditions, insufficient financial resources, scarce management and marketing skills, and self-censorship". In 2009 Freedom House assessed the Moldovan press as "not free", and Reporters Without Borders's Press Freedom Index saw it at the 114th position on 175 in 2009.

The change in power in 2009 and the arrival of foreign investments in the Moldovan media market have brought a new dynamism.

== Legislative framework ==
Moldova's media legislation is deemed rather good; yet, cases of abuses and intimidations persist.

The Constitution of Moldova guarantees to all citizens “the freedom of thought, opinion, as well as freedom of expression in public by words, images, or any other possible means” (art. 32.1). The same article (32.3) outlaws the “defamation of the state and the nation, the encouragement to war of aggression, to nationalistic, racial or religious hatred, incitement to discrimination, territorial separatism, public violence, as well as other manifestations that attempt at the legality of the constitutional regime”. The Criminal Code (Article 347) punishes with up to 3 years in prison the “profanation of the flag, coat of arms, or anthem of the Republic of Moldova or of any other state”, though this has been criticised as inconsistent with international standards.

Defamation has been decriminalised in Moldova in 2009. Yet, art. 70 of the Administrative Code still punishes libel and insults with up to 15 days in prison. Art. 16 of the Civil Code guarantees the right to respect, honour, dignity and professional reputation, and provides for the refutation of untruthful information and payment of moral and material compensations. The law places the burden of proof on journalists and does not specify the limits to compensation. As a result, authorities have in some cases claimed outrageous amounts in compensation from journalists as a way to influence the media and foster self-censorship.

The 2006 Broadcasting Code is the law regulating the media field. The Code also defines the responsibilities and powers of the independent authority supervising it, the Broadcasting Coordinating Council (BCC). The Code also establishes that the BCC should allocate at least 70% of frequencies to programmes in the state language (Romanian language).

The 2000 law on access to information provides that any resident citizen can request information from the public authorities without the need for justification. Yet, its implementation has been inconsistent. According to a 2008 monitoring report, authorities have responded only in 19.3% of cases. Compliance remains weak, as no authority is tasked with enforcement or supervision. Access is more difficult outside the capital, particularly in the autonomous region of Gagauzia. A positive step was made in October 2014 when authorities cancelled fees to access information about companies registered in Moldova.

A Law on state secret entered into force in May 2009, despite international concerns, restricting the possibility to access sensitive information.

Internet is not regulated in Moldova. In the April 2009 Moldovan parliamentary election protests (the “Twitter revolution”) the Communist government has been accused of limiting or blocking access to media outlets, to prevent further mobilisation of the population.

In 2015 amendments were proposed to the Law on Freedom of Expression, including a provision to prevent dissemination of materials from anonymous authors. OSCE Representative on Freedom of the Media Dunja Mijatović said that they could harm freedom of expression and of the media. A new draft contained less ambiguous provisions.

In July 2016 three amendments to the Audio-visual Code, aiming to limit foreign-language or foreign broadcasts, were adopted the Parliament in the first reading. According to Mijatović they would not comply with international standards on freedom of the media.

=== Anti-Russian "media propaganda" law ===
On 10 January 2018, after the Constitutional Court of Moldova suspended pro-Russia President Igor Dodon's powers on the issues, the pro-E.U. speaker of Moldova's parliament, Andrian Candu, signed a "media propaganda" law effectively banning the rebroadcasting in Moldova of Russian television programs on news, analysis, politics, and military issues.

=== Status and self-regulation of journalists ===
Different media organisations, including Teleradio-Moldova, have elaborated their own professional codes of conduct. A Code of professional ethics was adopted in 1999 by the Union of Journalists from Moldova.

In October 2009 a Press Council was set up by six civil society actors to increase the professionalism of print media and mediate in the disputes between readers and the press.

== Media outlets ==
Moldova (including Transnistria) hosted up to 410 media outlets in 2010, half of which established after 2000 - a relatively high number when compared to a small market. In 2014 there are around 64 television channels (of which 5 with national coverage, 4 privately owned), 57 radio stations, and 400 print publications in operation.

The media still command a high trust by the Moldovan population - 51.3% of Moldovan residents in 2009 affirmed to trust the media, which came second only to the Church (79.8%). Among them, the highest-trusted media is the television (60%).

The print media included around 60% of media outlets in 2008, with circulation figures ranging between 150/1000 copies for quarterly and biannual magazines, 500/25.000 for weeklies and 3000/9000 for dailies. Around 60% of the print media (50 outlets) is owned by the state, while 42 are private.

Broadcasting media included in 2009 166 cable operators, 38 terrestrial TV channels and 50 radio stations. The TV is seen daily by 83.4% of the population (compared to 51.4% for the radio) and remains the main source of information for 72.9% of Moldovans (the radio only for 8.9% of them).

Media pluralism has improved recently. Private owners control five of the six most popular TV channels, 2 of the top 3 radio stations, and 7 of the 8 major press agencies. Ownership transparency remains lacking, and concentration is not effectively regulated.

The media in Moldova are regularly used as a tool to advance the commercial or political interests of their owners, particularly at time of electoral campaigns. Regulations require broadcasters to submit a plan for electoral coverage and declare ownership structures, but several channels failed to do so in 2014, including Channel 2, Channel 3, Prime TV and Publika TV.

=== Print media ===
The print media maintains a small audience in Moldova. In November 2009, only 3% of citizens had the print media as their main source of information, and only 4.5% as most trusted media source. Only 10.2% read newspapers everyday, while 34.4% said they had not read a single newspaper in three months.

The print media is traditionally divided along language lines (Romanian and Russian-language media). Other minorities (Ukrainian, Gagauz, Bulgarian and Jewish) also have their own publications, though mainly in Russian language. Most Moldovan media are more committed to their owners' interests rather than to the general public ones'.

The Moldovan print press is mainly concentrated in the capital Chișinău, and the regional press is underdeveloped. The weak distribution system penalises rural areas, where newspapers still arrive with up to several days of delay. Most newspapers have online editions with distinct and updated contents.

The main daily newspaper in the republic, Moldova Suverana, is published by the government. Sfatul Țării is published by Parliament, which also publishes the daily Nezavisimaya Moldova in Russian. Other principal newspapers include Rabochiy Tiraspol (in Russian, the main newspaper of the Slavs in Transnistria), Ţara, Tineretul Moldovei/Molodezh Moldovy (in Romanian and Russian), and Viaţa satului (published by the government).

The main cultural publication in Moldova is the weekly journal Literatura și Arta, published by the Union of Writers of Moldova. Other principal periodicals include Basarabia (also published by the Writers' Union), Chipăruş, Alunelul, Femeia Moldovei, Lanterna Magică, Moldova, Noi, and SudEst.

Kishinëvskiye novosti, Kodry, and Russkoye Slovo are Russian-language periodicals. Other minority-language periodicals include Prosvita and Homin in Ukrainian, Ana sözu and Cîrlangaci in Gagauz, Rodno slovo in Bulgarian, and Undzer kol/Nash golos in Yiddish and Russian.

Some Moldovan press institutions have demonstrated a profitable potential. The Jurnal de Chișinău started as a weekly, became a daily and then launched an Internet TV channel and created a powerful media network, the Jurnal Trust Media.

=== Radio broadcasting ===
Radio Moldova (RM) started broadcasting on 30 October 1930 with a Romanian-language programme from an improvised studio in Tiraspol. It is today hosted in a 10-storey building built in the early 1990s and is part of the public broadcaster IPNA “Teleradio-Moldova”, usually deemed pro-governmental.

In October 1939, Radio Basarabia, a local station of the Romanian Radio Broadcasting Company, was the first radio station opened in Chișinău.

Antena C was launched in 1998, municipalised in 2004 and privatised in 2007, being taken over by acquaintances of the Party of Communists.

Other popular radio stations include Radio Free Europe/Radio Liberty, Vocea Basarabiei, Noroc, PRO FM Chișinău, Kiss FM, Radio Nova, Hit FM.

=== Television broadcasting ===
Television in Moldova was introduced in April 1958, within the framework of Soviet television. Through cable, Moldovan viewers can receive a large number of Russian channels, a few Romanian channels, and several Russian language versions of international channels in addition to several local channels. One Russian and two local channels are aired.

Television industry in Moldova begun in 1956 with the construction of the country's first dedicated television tower in Chişinău which took a little over a year to complete, the finished tower was 196 meters tall and could broadcast within a 60 km radius. The first television transmission was sent on 30 April 1958 at 19:00 and included amongst other things cheers from all the parties that participated in the project's development as well as some local celebrities.
At first programs were broadcast only two times a week on Friday and Sunday but by the end of 1958 broadcasts became daily. The first live broadcast in the country also happened in 1958.

In 1961 the coverage area was expanded after several relay masts were constructed in Bălţi, Cahul and Comrat. Since 1974 all broadcasts were made in color and in 1977 the first dedicated television studio was built which is still in use to this day. In the early 80's there were more than a million citizens with access to television sets. During the Soviet era there weren't all that many channels available with most of them being news and general purpose channels which were all state owned.

The industry did not really change much and only after the fall of the USSR was when the television industry in the country really started to gain momentum. One of the first cable companies to begin their operation in the country was EuroCable which began its operation shortly after the collapse of the Soviet Union, the company offered cable television to its customers with multiple local and foreign channels. EuroCable remained the dominant cable television provider until in the mid '90s it was bought by SunCommunications which merged it with its own service and re-branded it into SunTV. Because EuroCable and later SunTV began very early they gathered a large subscription base and remain the dominant cable television provider to this day offering their services in several large towns in the country.

During the 2000s many other Chişinău based cable television providers such as Satellit, Delta and Alfa emerged offering similar services as SunTV. In 2013 there were 95 registered television providers.

In 2007 Arax Communications launched its own cable television network called Zebra TV, which became the first digital network in the country. SunTV followed, launching its own digital network later that year. Until recently accessing television was only possible via cable but in 2011 StarNet and Moldtelecom launched their separate IPTV services in Chişinău and other towns offering multiple channels on both SD and HD qualities. Local broadcasting has remained fairly undeveloped since the time it was first launched although progress towards better quality is quite rapid with most local channels hoping to go digital by 2015.

Other TV channels include the following.

- NIT, established as a local station in 1997, expanded to the first private TV station with national coverage in 2005, also thanks to close relations with the then-ruling Party of Communists.
- N4 is a regional private TV station, also influenced by the Party of Communists.
- Pro TV Chișinău is an independent TV station launched in 1999, part of the Romanian group Pro TV.
- EuTV, formerly owned by the Chișinău Municipal Council, was privatized in 2007 and became a media influenced by the Christian-Democratic People's Party.
- Prime started broadcasting in Moldova in 1999 as a spin-off of Channel One Russia.
- TV 7, launched in 2006 by the Analitic Media Group in partnership with the Russian NTV.
- Mir Moldova, the local representative of the МТРК "МИР" was founded within the activity of the Community of Independent States.
- Alt TV is a new TV station re-broadcasting 70% of contents from the Romanian station B1 TV and 30% of original contents.
- TV Publika was launched in 2010 and supported by the Romanian Realitatea TV. It broadcasts in Romanian (80%) and Russian (20%).
- Jurnal TV, the first private news TV with national coverage, launched in 2010 by Jurnal de Chișinău's Jurnal Trust Media.
- Muz TV Moldova is a music and entertainment channel.

In late 2009, the main TV channels in Moldova include Moldova 1 (56.2 percent), Prime TV (55.4 percent), Pro TV (30.7 percent), NIT (21.7 percent), TV7 (9.7 percent), etc.

In the vigil of the 2014 Moldovan parliamentary election, most private channels aligned with specific political interests, favouring different candidates and parties.

- Four channels (Canal 2, Canal 3, Prime TV, Publika TV), owned by the General Media Group linked to the businessman Vlad Plahotniuc, favoured the pro-EU, centre-left government party Democratic Party of Moldova.
- The EuroTV, N4 and TV7 channels aligned with the pro-EU, centre-right Liberal Democratic Party of Moldova
- Accent TV favoured the pro-Russia Patria Party
- The public station Moldova 1 maintained a balanced coverage, though sliding towards favouring the pro-EU governmental coalition at times.

Subscriptions and penetration level (2014):

- ▼ Number of multichannel TV subscriptions - 273,083
- Penetration level - 7.68%

=== Public service broadcaster ===
Moldova's state-owned national radio-TV broadcaster is Teleradio-Moldova (TRM), which includes the TV channels Moldova 1 and TV Moldova Internațional (until 2013) and the radio channels Radio Moldova and Radio Moldova Internaţional (with broadcasts in Romanian, English, French, Spanish and Russian).

TRM is financed from the state budget and regulated under Moldova's Broadcasting Code by a Supervisory Board, ensuring that its activities serve the public interest. Notwithstanding several restructuring plans to transform it in a public service broadcaster, TRM remains biased in a pro-governmental way.

In the 2009 Manole and others versus Moldova case, the European Court on Human Rights recognised a violation of freedom of expression (Article 10 of the European Convention on Human Rights) due to the censorship practices at TRM, deemed an unjustified interference in the journalists' rights to free expression and free communication of information. At the time of the appeal (2002), TRM was the only channel with national coverage, and was particularly relevant for rural population without access to alternative sources of information (cable or satellite TV). The ECtHR thus reaffirmed the need for the state to provide impartial and unbiased information through its public service broadcaster.

=== Cinema ===
The Cinema of Moldova developed in the early 1960s during the Soviet period, experiencing a flowering of about a decade and a half. Stagnation followed, and after the Moldavian SSR became independent in 1991, the industry almost completely disappeared.

Moldova hosts 44 rural and 14 municipal cinemas, with an annual audience of 5,000 and 26,000 people respectively. In 2010 all Moldovan cinemas (except Odeon) broadcast Russian-distributed movies, since the country still lacked a centre of synchronization/subtitling of movies in Romanian.

The Cinematography Department within the Ministry of Culture was the regulatory authority in the film in 2001-2005, before being disbanded in 2006. Moldovan cinematography today lacks a comprehensive strategy.

- The Documentary Film Studio (later Moldova-film) was set up in Chișinău by the USSR Ministry of Cinematography in 1952. In the next 30 years, Moldova-film screened 120 fiction movies, 800 documentaries, 750 editions of the cinema magazine "Soviet Moldova", 40 editions of the satiric magazine “Usturici”, 40 cartoon pictures. In the 1980s the studio produced around 4 fiction movies and 25 documentaries yearly.

Production declined after the Soviet collapse and independence in the 1990s, while private studios for commercial productions appeared. Moldova-film, despite progressive dilapidation, maintained the inherited production capacities.

- The Telefilm-Chișinău studio was founded in 1959 as a creative association; it produced circa 300 artistic films, documentaries and concert-films. After a stop in the 1990s, it was partially relaunched in 2005.
- OWH TV Studio founded in 1995 as a creative atelier for young TV producers, has evolved into an independent and alternative production centre. It also launched in 2001 the International Documentary Film Festival CRONOGRAF, the only film festival in Moldova
- Prim-Plan Studio was launched in 2007 by the renowned film producer Valeriu Jereghi.

The Union of Film Makers of Moldova, constituted in 1962 as part of the Union of Film Makers of the Soviet Union, had 200 members around 2009.

=== Telecommunications ===
Telecommunications in Moldova are maintained at a relatively high performance level. Because Moldova is a small country, telecommunications companies managed to achieve good coverage in both wired and wireless communications infrastructure. Landline is available in most settlements, however mobile phone popularity has vastly increased in recent years. Mobile communications infrastructure are fairly well developed but suffer from high prices, nonetheless the amount of mobile subscriptions is growing very fast compared to the landline. As far as the Internet is concerned, Moldova has one of the best wired Internet connections in the world as well as one of the cheapest in $ per Mbit.

The TLC field is regulated by the National Agency for Regulation of Electronic Communications and for Technology of Information (ANRCETI), based on the Law on electronic communications, launched around 2000.

The state-owned Moldtelecom dominates the fixed telephony market, with a 97.52% share in 2009 (1.104.000 users). Penetration rate is 31.7%.

The mobile telephony market is shared among four main providers: Orange Moldova, operating since 1998 (France Télécom, Orange România; 74.24% market share in 2009); Moldcell, est. 2000 (TeliaSonera, Turkcell; 23.41%), Unite (Moldtelecom), and Eventis Mobile (Moldovan and Russian owners). Mobile penetration rate in 2009 was of 76.1%.

=== Internet ===
Internet in Moldova was hindered by an obsolete infrastructure and high subscription fees but is currently steadily developing. Online media started developing in Moldova in the late 2000s. In 2009, internet was the main source of information for only the 8.6% of residents, and the most trusted source for only the 6.7%. 17% of the population used internet daily, with a broadband penetration of 4.63%. Internet penetration reached 47% in 2014.

The Moldovan blogosphere is quite organised, with a website (Blogosfera.md) which in 2009 registered around 1000 blogs. It also holds a blogging competition (Blogovăţ). Journalists' blogs are also popular sources of information.

== Media organisations ==
=== Media agencies ===
The state-owned Moldpres is the oldest news agency in Moldova. It was founded in 1935 as Moldovan Telegraphic Agency, and was known in 1990-1994 as Information Agency Moldova-press. It has been renamed and put under governmental control since 1994. Moldpres also publishes the official gazette Monitorul Oficial.

BASA-press and Infotag are the first private news agencies in Moldova, both launched in 1992. Basa-press ended operations in 2010. Since 1997 DECA-press is a specialised news agency on regional development. Imedia was launched by former Radio BBC Chișinău employees, upon the closure of the channel in 2008. Infomarket.Md is devoted to economics news. Other news agencies include Info-Prim Neo, Interlic, Noutati-Moldova, Omega.

News agencies operating in the separatist region of Transnistria include Ольвия-Пресс (Olvia-Press) founded in 1992; Новый Регион-Приднестровье (New Region - Transnistria), part of the Russian Agency Новый Регион; and Лента ПМР (Lenta PMR)

=== Trade unions ===
The Union of Journalists of Moldova, founded in 1957 as a creative organisation, was re-organised in 1998 into a journalistic union. In 2009 it had around 400 members, but no real influence. In 2004 the Communist government tried to oppose it with an alternative trade union of loyalist journalists, the League of Professional Journalists, which was only operational for a year, but the polarisation of media professionals along partisan lines.

The Association of Independent Press, established in 1997, works for the development of independent regional media. The Association of Electronic Press (APEL), created in 1999, aiming to contribute to the development of the audiovisual domain. The Centre for promotion of freedom of expression and access to information “Access-Info” was established in 2000 and participated in the drafting of the new Law on access to information. Other professional associations include the Centre of Young Journalist from Moldova, founded in 2002, and the Association of Business Journalists.

In 2003 a group of Moldovan journalists and three media organisations (the Association of Independent Press, the Association of Electronic Press and the Press Freedom Committee) founded the Investigative Journalism Center.

The UN Resident Coordinator Office in Moldova founded the UN Journalists' Club in September 2001.

=== Regulatory authorities ===
The regulatory authority on public and private audiovisual media in Moldova is the Broadcasting Coordinating Council (Consiliul Coordonator al Audiovizualului - CCA), which supervises the enactment of the Broadcasting Code, and issues broadcasting licenses and retransmission authorizations. The CCA can examine complaints, ex officio or upon request, and hand gradual sanctions (public warning, temporary withdrawal of the right to broadcast advertisements, fine, temporary suspension of the license, and withdrawal of the broadcasting license). Its 9 members are appointed by the Moldovan Parliament to represent the public interest - although the appointment process is highly politicised. The CCA's "perceived lack of independence and politicized, opaque decision-making" remains a strong issue.

- During Communist governments (2001-2009) the CCA favoured pro-governmental broadcasters and applied legislation selectively.
- In 2012 the CCA closed down the pro-PCRM station NIT for lack of pluralism. The closure was upheld in appeal in 2013.
- In July 2014 the CCA suspended for 6 months the broadcasts of the Russian state-owned Rossiya 24, again for lack of pluralism, after complaints by a Liberal Reformist Party MP. Other outlets that re-transmits Russian channels were warned or fined in 2014.
- In September 2014 the Supreme Court of Moldova upheld the 2013 CCA quota obliging broadcasters to air at least 30% of locally produced programming, and half prime-time hours with Romanian-language programming.

Teleradio-Moldova's Supervisory Board (Consiliul de Observatori - CO), established under the Broadcasting Code, is tasked with ensuring that the national public broadcaster works in the public’s best interest. Its 9 members are prominent figures of the Moldovan public sphere, appointed by the Parliament. The Supervisory Board may adopt TRM Statute, approve its financial plan and editorial policy, and monitor its activities. It also confirms TRM's President and channels' Directors. As the CCA, the CO has so far been lacking in independence and remained highly vulnerable to political influences. In 2009, after the change in power, the CO dismissed TRM's President and Directors.

== Transparency of media ownership ==
Transparency of media ownership refers to the public availability of accurate, comprehensive and up-to-date information about media ownership structures. A legal regime guaranteeing transparency of media ownership makes possible for the public as well as for media authorities to find out who effectively owns, controls and influences the media as well as media influence on political parties or state bodies.

After the change of government in 2009, with the rise to power of the Alliance for European Integration, the parties forming the governing coalition, pushed by civil society, addressed the problem of transparency in the media sector together with the need to find solutions for reforming the public broadcaster, denationalizing the media, approve laws on defamation and ending monopolies in the media market. Public authorities initiated a process of cooperation with civil society organisations for reforming the media sector and since then civil society has been participating in the consultation for drafting new legislation with the aim of enhancing transparency and pluralism in the media field. However, despite these efforts and some improvements to the broadcasting law which was emended in 2015, Moldova still does not have a specific law on transparency of media ownership.

According to the expert media lawyer Corina Costin, the main problem leading to a lack of transparency about the owners of media outlets in Moldova arises from the existing legal framework, despite some improvements in recent years. For instance, the Press Law of 1994 does not include the concept of owner and only refers to founders and co-founders of press publications. This lack of definition hinders the application of media ownership requirements to this kind of media. In March 2015, the parliament passed some amendments to the broadcasting code that included requirements for radio and TVs to disclose the names and stakes of their owners and the names of board members, managers, senior staff, broadcasters and producers. The amendments was drafted by the Independent Journalism Center (IJC) that, together with other civil society organisations, had been advocating for years for enhancing transparency of media ownership. The new legislation entered into force in November 2015. Despite some improvements, it does not require the disclosure of information on owners of stakeholders companies which are registered offshore. The information disclosed thanks to this new provisions confirmed long-standing assumptions on alarming trends with regard to media ownership structure and media concentration.

Print media are included in the scope of the Law on the Press no. 243 of 1994, which is an obsolete law that has widely fallen into disuse. Article 12 and 13 contain provisions concerning media ownership transparency. Specifically, the law requires print media to make public information about the source and value of donations (including non-monetary ones) collected in the country and abroad to be disclosed twice a year and some mandatory data to be published in every issue (title of publication, the founder, the name of the editor, price per copy, address of the editorial office, circulation, number of registration, etc.). The law prohibits the circulation of publications which do not comply with these rules, but this provision is ineffective since there are no sanctions to enforce it. Under the law, the public has access to only a minimum part of information on management and founders of the publications, while the Minister of Justice requires more detailed information in order to issue the registration certificates to the media applying for them. In sum, public access to general ownership information on print media is largely limited. Moreover, the law does not oblige print media to disclose information about interests held in other media, nor about the persons other than those directly involved in the editorial structure that are in the position to exercise a significant influence over the editorial policy of the media outlet.

A specific law on transparency of media ownership has not yet be applied even if a draft proposal has been examined by the Parliament in 2014 in more than one reading, before being trapped in parliamentary procedures and being finally stopped as a consequence of political instability. According to expert Corina Cepoi, after some initial efforts and a good cooperation of civil society organisations with the Parliament’s Media commission, as the time passed, the draft law on media ownership transparency lost momentum and saw less and less political support.

== Concentration of media ownership and pluralism ==
=== Legal framework ===
Concentration of media ownership is regulated by the Broadcasting Code, that was approved in 2006 and amended (arguably too easily) multiple times. The Law on the Protection of Competition is also relevant. Nonetheless existing legal provisions are not effective.

The Broadcasting Code states that:

To protect pluralism and political, social and cultural diversity, the concentration of ownership shall be limited to dimensions that would ensure economic efficiency but would not generate a dominant position in forming public opinion.

— Article 7, Paragraph 5

And while there is a sanction, there is no provision on who should control the observance of the provision.

The Broadcasting Code provides that:

...broadcasting licenses shall be issued according to the principle of ensuring pluralism in broadcasting, excluding the possibility of creating conditions for monopoly and concentrations of property in broadcasting and in the media in general.

— Article 23, Paragraph 3, letter b)

The National Agency for the Protection of Competition (NAPC) is in charge of the implementation of this provision. The Code, However, does nothing to ensure the respect of this principle during the validity of license, after it is issued.

In October 2010 the Broadcasting Code also provided that:

A natural or legal person can own at most 2 (two) broadcasting licenses in the same administrative unit or area with no exclusive rights [to broadcasting]

— Paragraph 3 of Article 66, initial version

At some point the number of license was increased to five and the changed back to two with the final text being:

A natural or legal person can own at most 2 (two) broadcasting licenses in the same administrative unit or area with no exclusive rights [to broadcasting] and be a shareholder with a majority stake at most within two broadcasting [media]

— Paragraph 3 of Article 66, final version

However the amendment stated that "the broadcasting licenses issued before the coming into force of the present law remain valid until the expiry of their validity".

"No legal provisions exist to regulate the allocation of subsidies for media institutions or to distribute state advertising in a transparent or fair manner, enabling officials in charge of advertising budgets to play favorites and distribute resources under their control arbitrarily or for personal gain."

==== Draft Broadcasting Code ====
A new version of the Broadcasting Code was drafted in 2011 by civil society and media experts.

Article 105 is devoted to limiting property concentration in broadcasting. It provides restrictions for owners and spouses, but according to OSCE expert Katrin Nyman-Metcalf "it may be questioned if not more persons like also children could be covered to avoid it being too easy to circumvent the rules". Art. 106 sets to limit audience share on programme services market. Nyman-Metcalf find it difficult to understand it and fails to see a legitimate purpose for it. Penalties for violations of artt. 105 or 106 are provided by art. 108.

In any case, even if it was part of the program of the Alliance for European Integration coalition that came to power in 2009 and its successors, it became a legislative initiative only in March 2015 and, as of March 2016, it was stalled.

=== Current situation ===
Disclosures about media ownership, and thus concentration, were made in November 2015, when an amendment to the Broadcasting Code approved in March of the same year came into force. Media concentration is high and is considered a problem by Freedom House. In the short run the situation is not expected to improve.

Oligarch Vladimir Plahotniuc is "the owner of four of the country’s five national television stations—Prime TV, Publika TV, Canal 2, and Canal 3—in addition to three radio stations" controlling 60% of the shares on the information market. The four channels were found to have been partisan in the 2016 presidential election and were publicly warned by the Broadcasting Coordinating Council (BCC).

PLDM legislator Chiril Lucinschi (not to be confused with former President Petru Chiril Lucinschi) is the owner of two smaller television channels, TV7 and Bravo." In 2016 TV7 was also warned by the BCC.

More in general "private media remain financially – and editorially – dependent on affiliated businesses and political groups".

"In the run-up to local elections in June 2015 (...) most private television channels were aligned with particular parties or interests in their electoral reporting (...); online and print media were found to provide more diverse coverage."

Many local stations rebroadcast content from Russian media outlets. This is a source of concern for the pro-European government. In Spring 2016 a bill was proposed that would ban broadcasting from Russia. This would favor existing players, worsening the concentration problem.

== Censorship and media freedom ==
=== Legal framework ===
The Moldovan Constitution of 1994 held that:

The mass media may not be subject to censorship

— Art. Article 34, part (5) of the Moldovan Constitution of 1994

Similarly the Press Law:

Any kind of censorship of periodicals and news agencies and interference in their activity related to the preparation and distribution of information is prohibited

— Art. 19 of Law No. 243 of 26/10/1994

And also the Broadcast Code:

Any censorship of TV and radio communication is prohibited

— Art. 8, p.(2) of the Broadcast Code (No. 260 of 27/07/2006)

=== International ranking ===
Moldova is ranked as "partly free" in Freedom House 2016 Freedom of the Press report, with a score of 56, losing one point from the 55 of 2015 (0 is the best, 100 the worst).

Reporters without borders rank it as 76th of 180 countries, on a decline from the 72nd position of 2015 and the 55th/56th of 2012/2014, though better than the 98th/114th positions of 2008/2009.

=== Attacks and threats against journalists ===
Physical attacks against journalists are rather rare in Moldova.

- In June 2014, journalist and human rights activist Oleg Brega was assaulted in Chișinău by two masked men.
- In September 2014 threats were sent to the investigative newspaper Ziarul de Gardă after it had published information on the assets and personal life of the leader of the Moldovan Orthodox Church.

In some cases, detentions have been reported as a way to stifle free speech.

- In 2011 Eduard Bagirov, a Russian-language writer and journalist blogger, was held in pre-trial detention for several months without official charges, notwithstanding protests and a hunger strike by Bagirov.

In 2015-2016 Russian journalists were repeatedly denied entry to Moldova.

=== Political interferences ===
State authorities and policy makers are known to make "recommendations" and "friendly pressure" on what to report or not, and how.

Authorities prohibited journalists to be present at the renewed Parliament's plenary hall, restricting them to a separate press room. The Independent Journalism Centre (IJC) criticised the policy as a violation of access and pressed the government to repeal it, also lamenting the insufficient space devoted to journalists.

In January 2014 several cable operators excluded three broadcasters from their basic packages. The excluded ones were the opposition-linked Accent TV, the critical Jurnal TV, and RTR Moldova which rebroadcasts Russian media. They were reintroduced following objections from the public and international organisations such as the OSCE.

In 2022, the government removed the broadcasting licenses from six television stations for allegedly broadcasting pro-Russian propaganda and disinformation about Russia's invasion of Ukraine in violation of the country's Audiovisual Services Code. The stations were Primul, RTR Moldova, Accent TV, NTV Moldova, TV6 and Orhei TV. The government stated that this was done in order to "prevent the risk of disinformation or attempts to manipulate public opinion". All six were either owned or affiliated with Ilan Șhor, a fugitive pro-Russian politician and businessman who fled to Israel in 2019 after being convicted of fraud and money-laundering and sentenced to 15 years in prison in absentia.

In October 2023 Moldova, having declared a national emergency, blocked several websites of major Russian news media organizations, including TASS and Interfax. They were accused of taking part in an information war against the country. In a separate decree, Moldova also suspended the licenses of six domestic TV channels broadcasting Russian disinformation. Since 2022 Moldova already banned news and analysis programming from Russia. Orizont TV, ITV, Prime, Publika TV, Canal 2 and Canal 3 were also banned for a stated reason of "undermining the local elections".

=== Civil defamation lawsuits ===
Despite decriminalisation of defamation in 2009, cases keep being filed against media outlets in the Moldovan courts, which are reputed for their lack of integrity. Courts also do not publish number of cases filed.

- In August 2011 the investigative newspaper Ziarul de Gardă was ordered to pay €33,000 in defamation damages to two Glodeni prosecutors for reporting about their alleged wrongdoings - judgement upheld in appeal, although with reduced damages, and finally dismissed by Moldova's Supreme Court in July 2012. "Media should be free to criticize public officials for the benefit of their societies and should not risk going bankrupt due to extortionate moral damage awards paid to public officials", the OSCE Representative for Freedom of the Media commented.
- In July 2014 Ruslan Popa, leader of the splinter Reformist Communist Party of Moldova, won a case for defamation against Accent TV, which had to pay 130,000 lei ($9,000) in damages - although the case had been filed incorrectly, inter alia beyond the 30-days limit established by the 2010 Law on Freedom of Expression.

=== Self-censorship ===
To avoid problems, including loss of state funds and lawsuits, media owners or journalist themselves practice self-censorship. Most journalists' contracts do not protect freedom of the journalist within the organization.

== See also ==
- Media of Transnistria
