= Hadârcă =

Hadârcă is a Moldovan surname. Notable people with the surname include:

- Ion Hadârcă (born 1949), Moldovan poet, translator, and politician
- Petru Hadârcă (born 1963), Moldovan director and actor
