= Access to public information in Moldova =

Overview of freedom of information in Moldova

Access to public information and freedom of information (FOI) refer to the right to access information held by public bodies also known as "right to know". Access to public information is considered of fundamental importance for the effective functioning of democratic systems, as it enhances governments' and public officials' accountability, boosting people participation and allowing their informed participation into public life. The fundamental premise of the right to access public information is that the information held by governmental institutions is in principle public and may be concealed only on the basis of legitimate reasons which should be detailed in the law.

Access to information, just as media independence and pluralism remain critical issues in the Republic of Moldova. Despite numerous calls for media legislation reform, the government of Moldova has not made significant steps to improve access to information according to the country's international obligations, including a convention with the Council of Europe. Public officials widely impede access to public information through refusals, delays or incomplete answers, without sanctions. In 2014, the Independent Journalism Center (IJC) presented to Parliament amendments to improve the law on access to information, provide additional guarantees for journalists and limit unjustified limitations of access to public information by public officials. However, the draft law has not yet been adopted. According to the Executive Director of the Association of Independent Press, Petru Macovei, overall the law on access to information is good, but it is compromised by a non-collaborative attitude of the public authorities.

== Legal framework ==
The right to access public information in guaranteed by Article 34 of the Moldovan Constitution and is regulated by the Law on Access to Information which was adopted in 2000. The law establishes that information of public interest can be requested in writing or orally. Information can be consulted at the institution’s premises or can be received stored in an electronic support or in hardcopy. Viewing documents on the institution’s premises is free of charge, while reasonable fees can be charged for the cost of photocopying, transcribing, translating or delivering the documents. According to the law, documents of public interest must be provided within 15 working days, which can be extended by five days in case of requests of large numbers of documents. If the request is rejected, the applicant can exercise its right of appeal to the relevant courts, and if the court decides on behalf of the applicant, the law imposes penalties in form of fines to the government body which has violated the law. Exceptions justifying limitation to the disclosure regime are specified in the law and include state secrets, information on the military, intelligence, economic, foreign policy or criminal proceedings, information concerning ongoing lawsuit, personal data, confidential business data, and preliminary results of scientific and technical research.

== Access to information in practice ==
In practice, compliance with the Law on Access to Information remains weak just as its implementation which is not supported by the full authority of the bodies responsible for its enforcement. The Ombudsman in Moldova has the authority to supervise the implementation of the law, but this office lacks the capacity and the resources to exercise its role. Investigative journalists and civil society organisations face numerous difficulties when requesting access to public information, including obstruction by public officials, refusals and delays in replying to requests, as well as incomplete responses to requests for information. To justify their denials, public officials frequently cite laws that conflict with the Law on Access to Information, in particular the Law on State Secrets and the Law on Trade Secrets.

One of the problem in enforcing the right to access public information is impunity, meaning that the law establishes only insignificant fines on public offices who fail to provide due access to information. Also, in many cases, the information provided by state bodies is shaped in the officials' favor, giving the impression that authorities are behaving in compliance with the law, while in fact depriving the requester the information they are seeking. Moreover, in many cases officials do not provide public interest information without the approval from a supervisor and often refuse to answers telephone calls from journalists, thus increasing the time for getting the required information.

Another problem concerns the costs for obtaining public information and the fees charged to the requester, despite some improvements made recently, such as the introduction of a public register through the E-Government service in 2014. This affects in particular newsrooms and investigative journalists that must pay large sums of money for getting data useful for their investigative work.

== See also ==
- Access to public information in Europe
- Freedom of information
- Freedom of information laws by country
- Transparency of media ownership in Europe
- Media of Moldova
- Transparency of media ownership in Moldova
