= Romanian television =

Romanian television may refer to:

- Communications media in Romania
- Televiziunea Română, TVR, the national television network
- List of Romanian-language television channels
