= Euronova TV =

- Country: Moldova
- Headquarters: Ungheni, Moldova

Programming
- Language(s): Romanian

Ownership
- Owner: Euronova Media Grup

Euronova TV is a television station in Moldova. Its headquarters are in Ungheni.

It provides news of public interest from a number of areas. Euronova TV is a member of Euronova Media Group Holding, which includes Albasat TV and the radio station Vocea Basarabiei.
