= Odobescu =

Odobescu is a Romanian surname. Notable people with the surname include:

- Alexandru Odobescu (1834–1895), Romanian author, archaeologist, and politician
- Anna Odobescu (born 1991), Moldovan singer and actress
- Luminița Odobescu (born 1969), Romanian diplomat
- Vasile Odobescu (died 1953), Moldovan activist
