= Publika FM =

Chişinău; Moldova
- Frequency: 92.1 FM

Programming
- Language: Romanian

Links
- Webcast: LIVE

Publika FM is a Romanian language radio station in Chişinău, the capital of the Republic of Moldova.

== See also ==
- Publika TV
