= Victor Cobăsneanu =

Moldovan politician and journalist (born 1960)

- Born: 9 December 1960 (age 65); Cuizăuca
- Occupation: Journalist
- Employer(s): Observatorul de Nord; Vocea Basarabiei

Victor Cobăsneanu (born 9 December 1960) is a journalist from Soroca, Republic of Moldova. He has been the editor in chief of Observatorul de Nord in Soroca since 1988. Also, he is an editorialist of Vocea Basarabiei.

== Biography ==
Victor Cobăsneanu graduated from Ion Creangă Pedagogical State University in 1986 and worked as correspondent for Moldpres, correspondent for „Nezavisimaia Moldova” and adviser of the prefect of Soroca. He is a member of the Union of Journalists of Moldova.

== Awards ==
- "Best reporter in the Independent Press Association”.
- Prize “Gold Cup for Prestigious Business”, of the newspaper "Actualidad", Spain
