= Victor Rusu =

Moldovan politician

Personal details
- Born: 1953 (age 72–73) Nisporeni
- Party: Liberal Democratic Party of Moldova; Social Liberal Party (Moldova)
- Known for: Mayor Paşcani, Criuleni
- Awards: Order of the Star of Romania

Victor Rusu (born 1953) is a politician, journalist, and activist from Moldova. He served as Mayor of Nisporeni and a leader of the Social Liberal Party (Moldova). He has been the leader of the Liberal Democratic Party of Moldova in Nisporeni since February 2008. He has a show on Vocea Basarabiei radio station.

== Awards ==
Victor Rusu was awarded, by a presidential decree, with Romania's highest state decoration – the Order of the Star of Romania. He was also awarded the state diploma.
