= Observatorul de Nord =

- Format: A3
- Owner(s): Victor Cobăsneanu & Elena Cobăsneanu
- Publisher: PPI "Observatorul de Nord"
- Editor-in-chief: Victor Cobăsneanu
- Founded: 1998
- Language: Romanian & Russian
- Headquarters: Soroca
- Website: Observatorul de Nord

Observatorul de Nord (English: North Observatory) is a newspaper from Soroca, the Republic of Moldova, founded in 1998 by Victor Cobăsneanu.
