= Democratic Agrarian Party =

Democratic Agrarian Party Partidul Democrat Agrar
- President: Vasile Odobescu
- Founded: 1950
- Dissolved: 1953
- Headquarters: Chişinău
- Ideology: Agrarianism
- Colours: Green

From left to right: Ilarion Tautu, Vasile Odobescu, and Alexandru Duca

The Democratic Agrarian Party (Romanian: Partidul Democrat Agrar) was a clandestine political party in the Moldovan SSR.

== Activity ==
The leader of the Democratic Agrarian Party was Vasile Odobescu. During the Soviet deportations from Bessarabia and Northern Bukovina, his family was deported from Bessarabia.

In 1953, Vasile Odobescu was sentenced to death and Ilarion Tautu and Alexandru Duca were sentenced to 25 years in prison.

== See also ==
- List of political parties in Moldova
