= Aurelian Silvestru =

Aurelian Silvestru OR
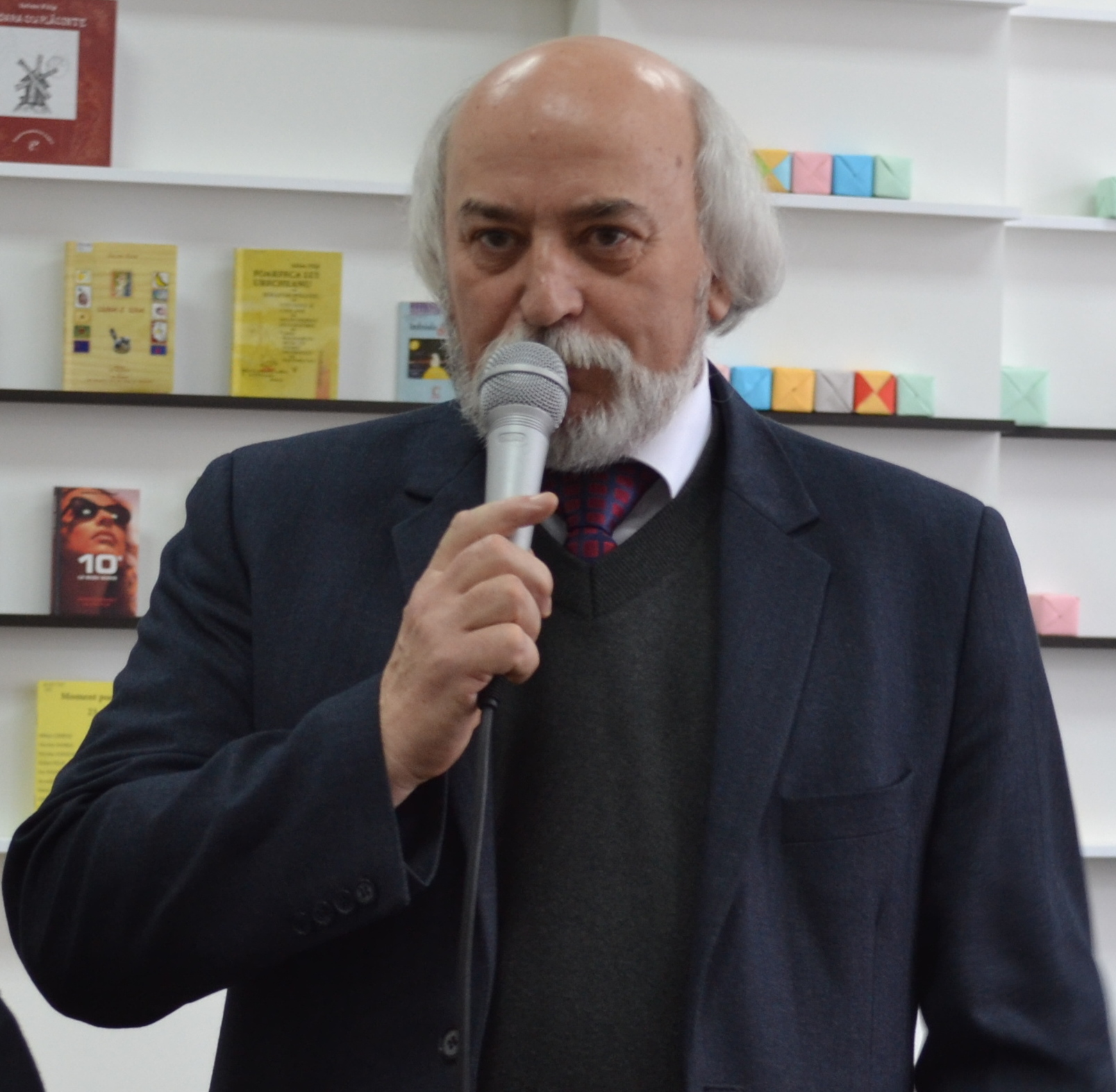
- Silvestru in 2014
- Born: 1 October 1949 (age 76); Cuşelăuca, Moldavian SSR, Soviet Union
- Education: Alecu Russo State University of Bălți
- Known for: Head of Prometeu-Protalent Lyceum editorialist Vocea Basarabiei
- Awards: Order of the Republic (Moldova)

Aurelian Silvestru (born 1 October 1949) is a writer and activist from Moldova. He is the founder and the head of the Prometeu-Protalent Lyceum, a leader of Democratic Forum of Romanians in Moldova, and an editorialist of Vocea Basarabiei.

== Biography ==
Aurelian Silvestru graduated from Alecu Russo State University of Bălți and got a PhD from Moscow Institute of Psychology. Prometeu-Protalent Lyceum is a private school founded in 1993 by Aurelian Silvestru.

Aurelian Silvestru is an editorialist of Vocea Basarabiei radio station. He is a leader of Democratic Forum of Romanians in Moldova.

== Awards ==
- Order of the Republic (Moldova)
