= Gazeta Românească =

Newspaper in Moldova

- Owner: Euronova Media Group
- Founders: Ioan Mânăscurtă; Princeps Association; Vladimir Saharneanu; Alecu Reniţă; Boris Vieru
- Editor-in-chief: Ioan Mânăscurtă
- Founded: 2001
- Language: Romanian
- Headquarters: Chişinău

Gazeta Românească (English: The Romanian Gazette) was a newspaper from the Republic of Moldova, founded in 2001 by Ioan Mânăscurtă (26%), Princeps Association (9%), Vladimir Saharneanu (25%), Alecu Reniţă (20%), and Boris Vieru (20%). It was administered by Ioan Mânăscurtă until 2002, and subsequently by Vladimir Saharneanu from 2002 until the conclusion of the publication.
