= Independent Journalism Center =

Nonprofit organization

- Established: 1994
- Legal status: Non-profit
- Headquarters: Chișinău, MD
- Board of directors: Nadine Gogu

The Independent Journalism Center of Moldova (IJC) is a non-governmental, nonprofit organization based in Chișinău, Moldova, that promotes independent and ethical journalism, supports media pluralism, and defends press freedom in the country.

== History and Mission ==
Founded in 1994, the IJC was established in response to the need for an independent institution that would strengthen professional journalism in post-Soviet Moldova. Its mission is to contribute to the development of a free and pluralistic media environment by promoting media literacy, professional standards in journalism, and access to quality information.

== Activities ==
The Independent Journalism Center of Moldova carries out various initiatives aimed at supporting media development and journalistic standards in the country. These include organizing training sessions and educational programs for journalists, with a focus on topics such as investigative reporting, ethics, and misinformation.

The center also conducts media monitoring, particularly during election periods, to evaluate coverage and detect potential bias or disinformation.

In addition, it works to improve media literacy among the general population and in schools through educational campaigns and teaching materials. The IJC provides legal assistance to journalists facing challenges related to their professional activities and advocates for legislative reforms to improve the media environment in Moldova.

The IJC is a member of the South East European Network for Professionalization of the Media (SEENPM) and collaborates with international organizations such as the Institute for War and Peace Reporting (IWPR). It has played a role in promoting transparency during election campaigns and in supporting journalists during politically sensitive events, such as the parliamentary elections in Moldova.

Through its training programs and advocacy efforts, the center has contributed to improving the quality of journalism and strengthening media institutions in the country.

== See also ==
- Media of Moldova
- Freedom of the press
