= Union of Journalists of Moldova =

- Uniunea Jurnaliştilor din Moldova
- Founded: October 1, 1957; 68 years ago
- Headquarters: Chişinău
- Location: Moldova
- Members: 400
- Key people: Valeriu Saharneanu
- Affiliations: International Federation of Journalists; Association of European Journalists
- Website: Official website

The Union of Journalists of Moldova (Romanian: Uniunea Jurnaliştilor din Moldova) is a non-governmental organisation promoting interests of journalists involved in Moldovan media.

== Overview ==
The Union of Journalists of Moldova (then Moldovan SSR) was formed in October 1957. The Union has 400 active members. Valeriu Saharneanu has been the head of the Union of Journalists of Moldova since 1997. The union is a full member of the Association of European Journalists.

Freelance journalists in Moldova are encouraged to apply for a press card through the union, or through international press card providers.

== See also ==
- List of newspapers in Moldova
- Television in Moldova
