= Cuizăuca =

- Village
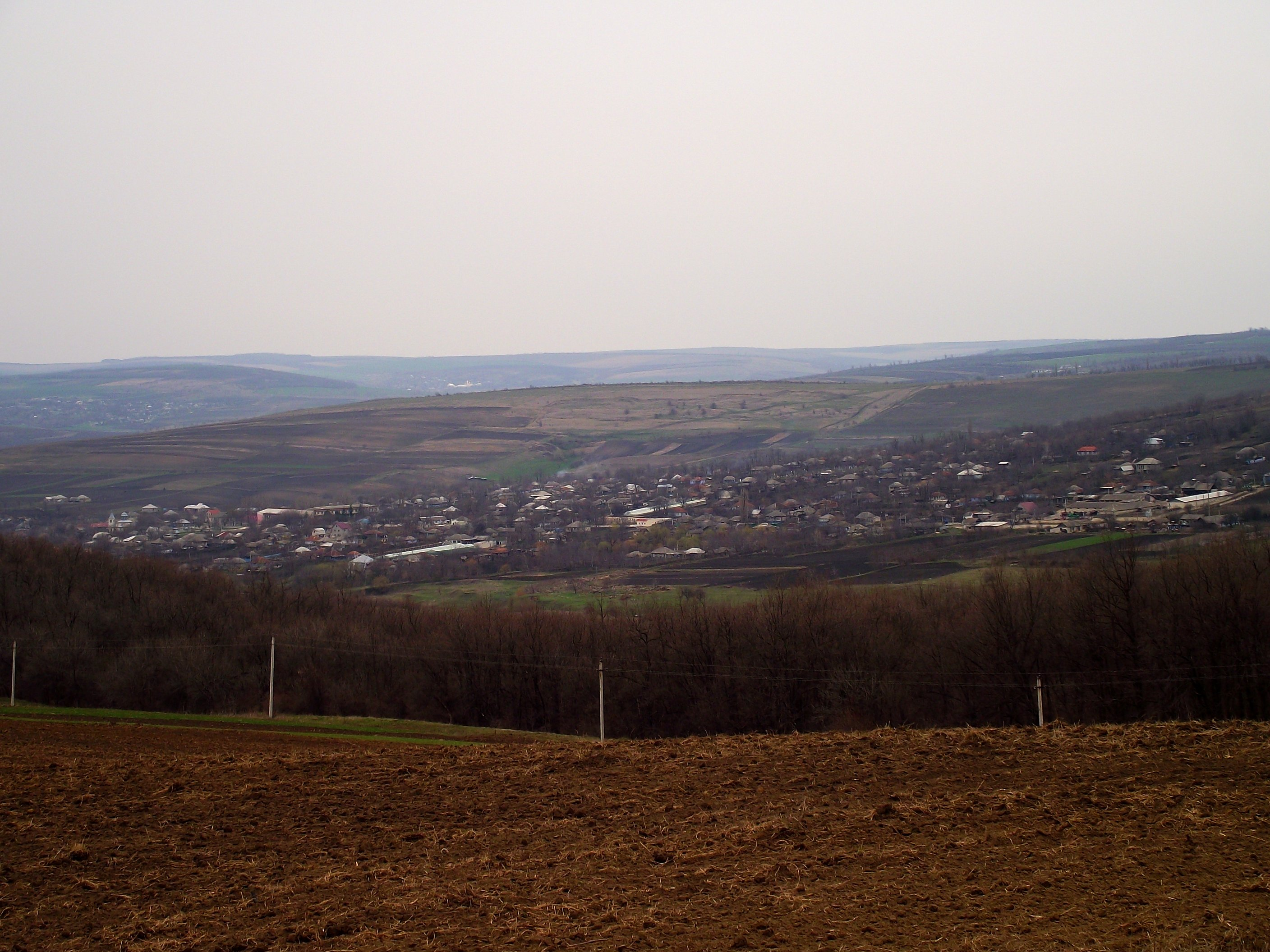
- Cuizâuca

- Location in Moldova
- Coordinates: 47°37′N 28°49′E
- Country: Moldova
- District: Rezina District

Government
  - Mayor: Turcan Ion Vasile
- Elevation: 535 ft (163 m)

Population (2014 census)
  - Total: 1,378
- Time zone: UTC+2 (EET)
  - Summer (DST): UTC+3 (EEST)
- Postal code: MD-5415
- Area code: +373 254
- Registration plate: RZ

Cuizăuca is a village in Rezina District, Moldova.

== Notable people ==
- Valeriu Saharneanu
- Vasile Odobescu
- Victor Cobăsneanu
- Zoey Logan
