= RU.TV =

Russian music TV channel

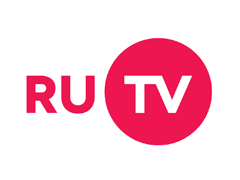
- Broadcast area: EU, Russia
- Headquarters: Russia

Programming
- Language(s): Russian language

Ownership
- Owner: Russian Media Group
- Sister channels: HITV, RU TV Moldova, RU.TV Belarus, RU24TV

History
- Launched: 1 October 2006; 18 years ago
- Founder: Sergey Kozhevnikov

Links
- Website: www.ru.tv (Russian)

RU.TV is a Russian music TV channel founded by Sergey Kozhevnikov and owned by Russian Media Group. It started broadcasting in October 2006 as the video version of Russkoye Radio.

== Programming ==
In January 2017 RU.TV switched to the 16:9 format and began broadcasting in HDTV.

=== Broadcast ===
In several Russian cities—Derbent, Domodedovo, Kaspiysk, Kyzyl, Perm, Simferopol and Makhachkala—RU.TV is on broadcast analog frequencies. Since the channel was carrying commercials before they were banned on broadcast television at the beginning of 2015, it is allowed to continue doing so.

=== Cable ===
In Russia RU.TV is carried by ER-Telecom. When it went live in 2009 it was carried on Akado; a year later it moved to National Cable Networks. In Moscow this put RU.TV on Mostelekom; later in 2010 it became available online.

=== Satellite ===
RU.TV is freely available on the Yamal 201 and ABS-2A satellites.

=== Network partners ===
RU.TV partners with Labytnangi-TV in that city, PTK-Avto in Perm and MTV POBEGAILO in Slavgorod.
