= National Cable Networks =

Russian telecommunications company

National Cable Networks (Russian: Национальные кабельные сети) was a Russian company which provides Pay-TV. It was fully owned by Rostelecom, and headquartered in Moscow. The company merged with Rostelecom in 2013.

== History ==
In 2001 formed of "National Cable Networks." The first step was the acquisition of companies "Infokos +" and "Eltelekor" in the Moscow region and "NovAKTV" in Novosibirsk, the company subsequently entered the markets of Kurgan and Yekaterinburg.

In 2005 JSC "NCC" has completed the acquisition of 98% shares of JSC "St. Petersburg broadcaster Cable TV" (BD).

In March 2006 formed of National Telecommunications, which becomes the holding company for OAO "NCC" and several other companies.

In early 2012 OJSC Rostelecom consolidated 100% of voting shares of NTC. On October 1, 2013 the company became a 100% subsidiary of Rostelecom as part of reorganization which liquidated Svyazinvest, and transferred all its companies under the umbrella of Rostelecom group.
