= Vasile Odobescu =

Romanian political party founder

- From left to right: Ilarion Tautu, Vasile Odobescu, and Alexandru Duca
- Born: Cuizăuca
- Died: 1953
- Known for: Democratic Agrarian Party founder and leader
- Children: Maria Filipciuc (Odobescu), Ion Odobescu si Nicolai Odobescu

Vasile Odobescu (born Cuizăuca) was a founder and leader of the anti-Soviet organization Democratic Agrarian Party.

== Biography ==
Vasile Odobescu was born in Cuizăuca, a locality in the north of Moldova. During the Soviet deportations from Bessarabia and Northern Bukovina, his parents and his sister were deported from Moldovan SSR (Bessarabia) to Siberia.

In 1950, he founded the Democratic Agrarian Party, one of the largest and best anti-Soviet resistance organizations in rural areas of the Moldovan SSR. The leaders of the party were Vasile Odobescu and Simion Zlatan (born in Popenchi, Rîbnița). The Democratic Agrarian Party was active between the years 1950 and 1953.

In 1953, Odobescu and other important members of the party were arrested; he and 10 members were subsequently sentenced to death that same year.

In a book printed in 2000, the historian Ion Țurcanu wrote the chapter "Vasile Odobescu, a soldier of the disinherited people" (Romanian: Vasile Odobescu, un ostaş al dezmoșteniților).

== See also ==
- Democratic Agrarian Party

== Bibliography ==
- Ion Ţurcanu, "Vasile Odobescu, un ostaş al dezmoşteniţilor", in Moldova antisovietică. Aspecte din lupta basarabenilor împotriva ocupaţiei sovietice. 1944–1953. Ed. Prut Internaţional, colecţia Clio (coordonator, Ion Negrei, Chişinău, 2000. Editată cu sprijinul Fundaţiei Soros, Moldova.
