= RU TV Moldova =

RU TV Moldova is a music television channel based in Chișinău, Moldova. The channel retransmits programmes of RU.TV from Russia.

The programmes that the channel have is RU.TV News which is in Russian is on Fridays at 20:30 and Saturdays at 10:00 and the Moldovan bulletin is at Saturdays at 19:30 and Sundays at 10:00, Minutka Poeziy and a Moldovan format of Stol Zakazov which is on Mondays to Fridays at 19:00.
