= Interdnestrcom =

- Company type: JSC
- Industry: Mobile telecommunications Internet
- Founded: 1998
- Headquarters: Tiraspol (Transnistria)
- Owner: Viktor Gushan
- Website: http://www.idc.md/

Interdnestrcom is a Transnistrian telecommunication company providing mobile communication services for Transnistria, a breakaway unrecognized state internationally recognized as part of Moldova. It was established in 1998. As well as providing mobile phone services, it also provides dial-up and ISDN internet access.

== Internet ==
Interdnestrcom provides Internet access in the Transnistrean territory under the brand of OK. Internet access is provided via ADSL. OK's services are available in all large towns in Transnistria.

== TV ==
Interdnestrcom provides TV services among which: analog television (up to June 2011 ), digital television and IP-television.

== Fixed telephony ==
Is provided under the brand Transtelecom.

== Mobile telephony ==
Interdnestrcom operates in the VoLTE standard on the 800 MHz frequency (LTE band 20). It no longer has a 2G or 3G network, so phones used on the network must support VoLTE for voice calls. The coverage area includes almost all of the Transnistria region and several towns of Moldova which are considered outside the Transnistria region and Ukraine.

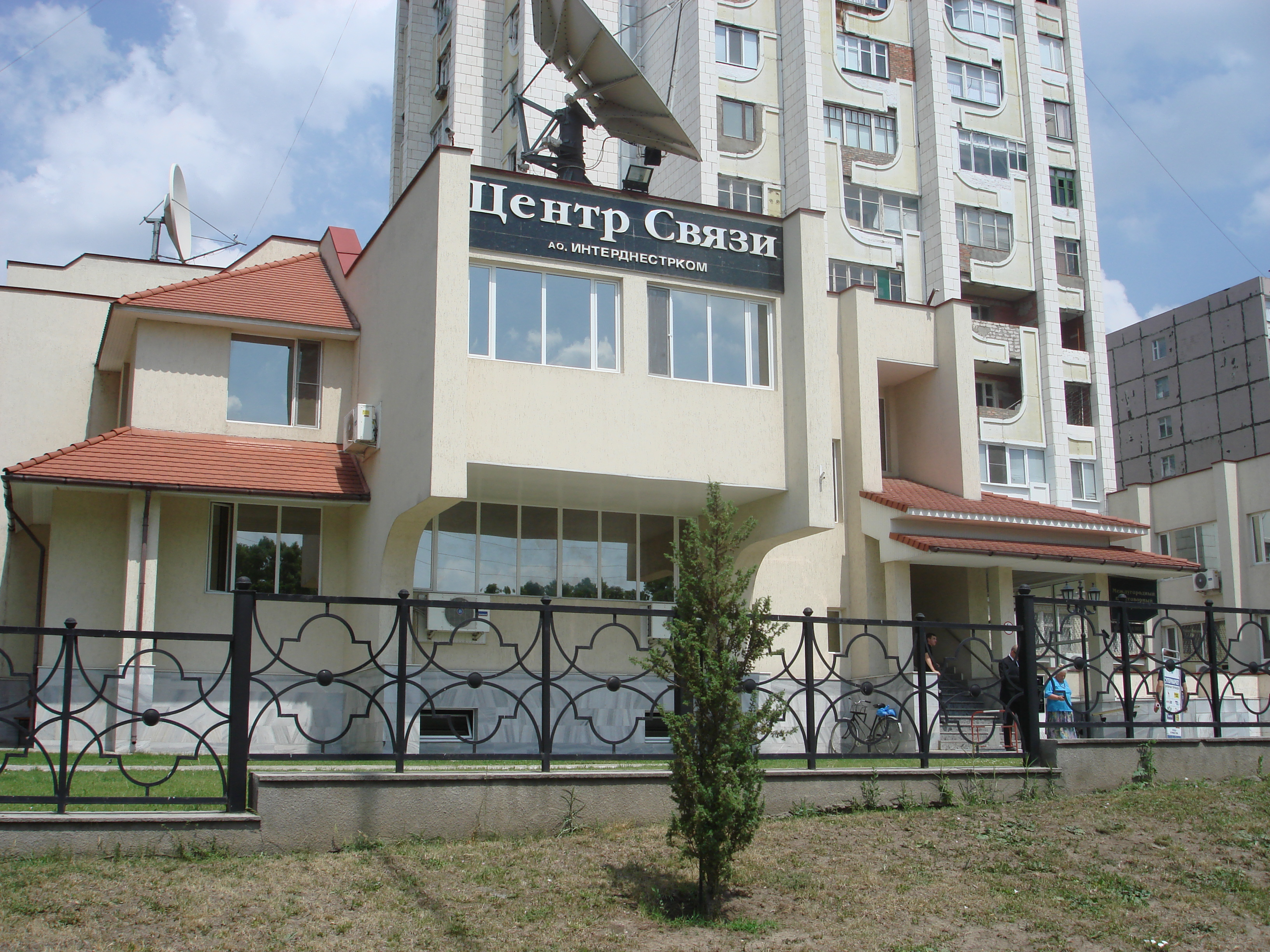
Interdnestrcom in Tiraspol

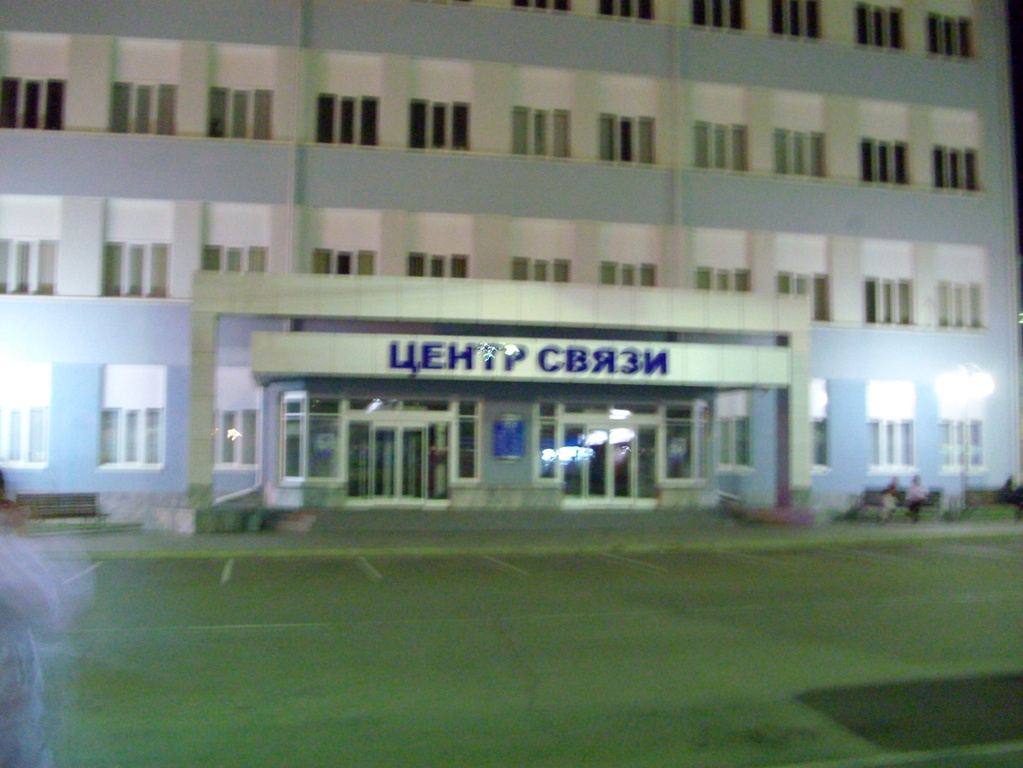
Interdnestrcom

== Support service ==
198 — uniform number of support on all lines of business IDC from any mobile or fixed phone of Transnistria.

== Criticism ==
=== Skype and other VoIP clients blocking ===
On 6–7 November 2010 some subscribers began expecting troubles with access to VoIP soft. As the result of this after some time all the subscribers of Interdnestrcom were blocked VoIP services including Skype and many others. International calls with the help of such software became impossible.

== See also ==
- Internet in Moldova
- Communications in Transnistria
