= Malcoci =

- Village
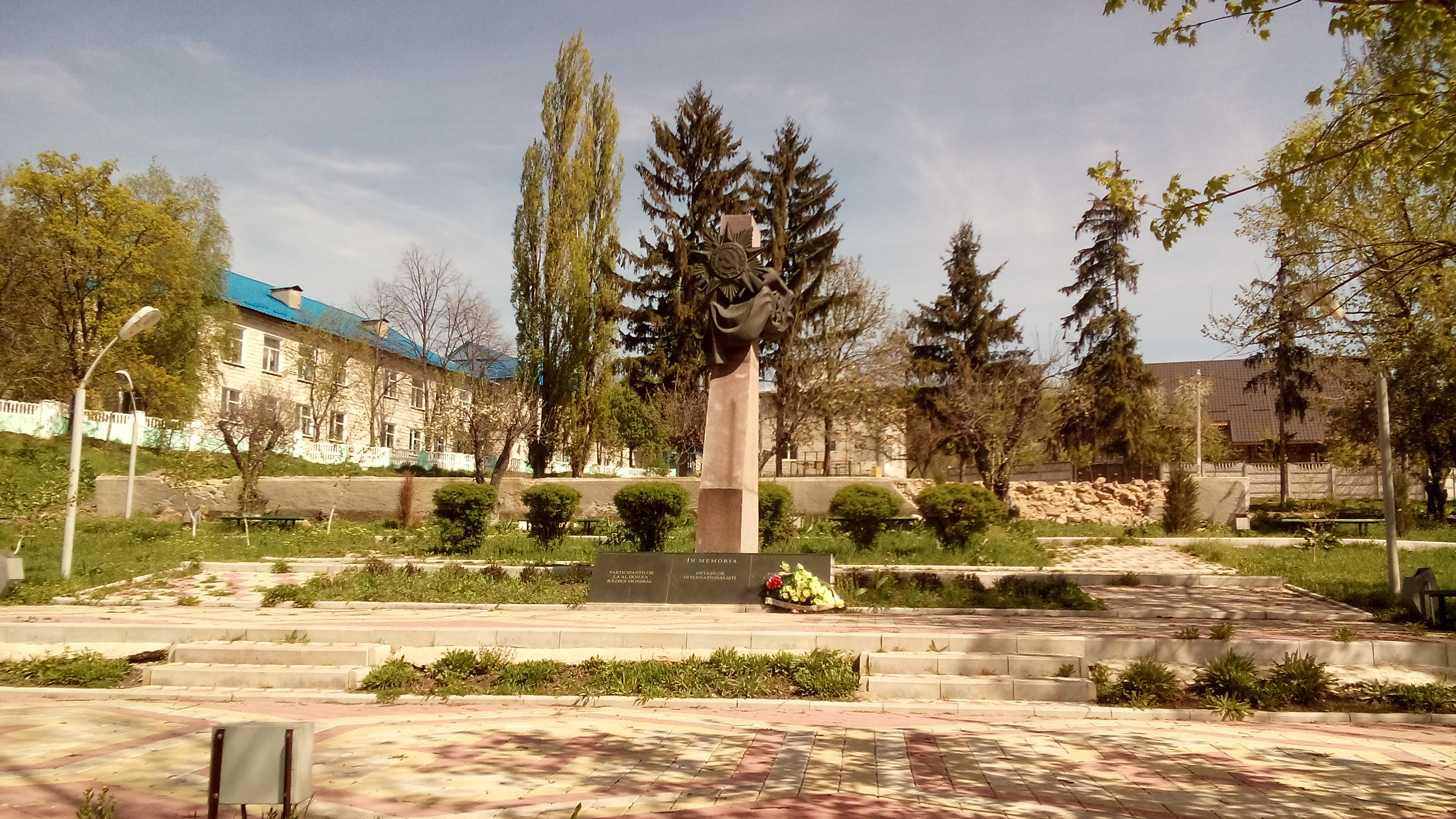

- Location within Moldova
- Coordinates: 47.0333333333°N 28.6333333333°E
- Country: Moldova
- District: Ialoveni District

Government
  - Mayor: Serghei Puiu (PDM)

Population (2014 census)
  - Total: 2,411
- Time zone: UTC+2 (EET)
  - Summer (DST): UTC+3 (EEST)

Malcoci is a village in Ialoveni District, Moldova.
