= Petru Hadârcă =

Moldovan actor and director

Petru Hadârcă OR
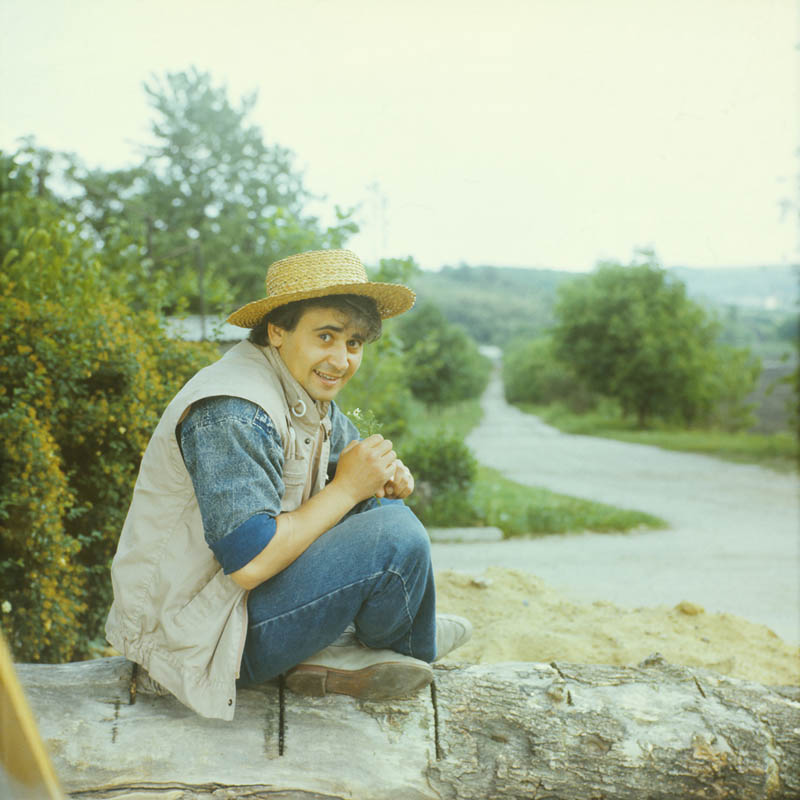
- Hadârcă in the 1990s
- Born: May 8, 1963 (age 63); Sângerei, Moldavian SSR, Soviet Union
- Education: Boris Shchukin Theatre Institute
- Occupations: Director, Actor

Petru Hadârcă (born 8 May 1963) is a director and actor from Moldova. He served as head of the Mihai Eminescu National Theatre in Chişinău.

Petru Hadârcă completed the B.V.Schukin Higher Theatre School (Institute) in 1985 and then he was a director and actor in Chişinău and Romania. He had a radio show on Vocea Basarabiei in Chişinău.
