= RTR Moldova =

Channel based in Moldova

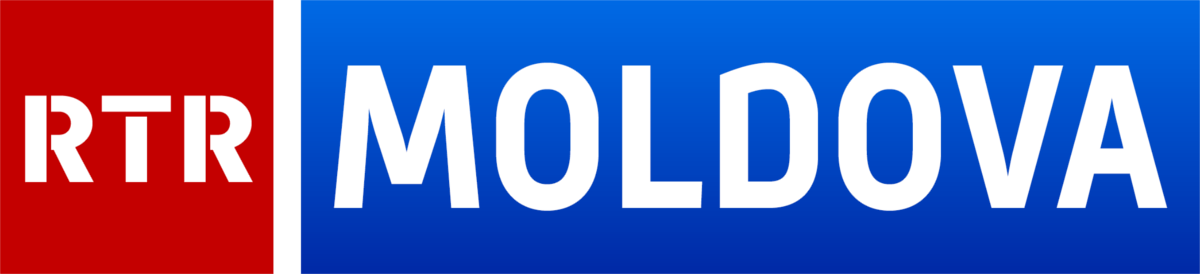
- Country: Moldova
- Broadcast area: Moldova
- Headquarters: Chișinău, Moldova

Programming
- Languages: Romanian, Russian
- Picture format: 576i (16:9 SDTV)

Ownership
- Owner: VGTRK

History
- Launched: 1 January 2013; 13 years ago
- Closed: 16 December 2022; 3 years ago

Links
- Website: www.rtr.md

RTR Moldova was a Russian and Romanian-language television channel based in Chișinău, Moldova. Owned by VGTRK, the station primarily retransmits programs from the Russian network Rossiya 1 alongside local programming. The channel shut down after its broadcasting license was suspended on December 16, 2022 by the Moldovan Commission for Exceptional Situations.

== Programming ==
RTR Moldova's schedule includes a variety of news and entertainment programs produced in both Romanian and Russian:

- Vesti-Moldova: A news program airing Monday through Friday at 13:00, 16:00, and 20:45.
- Pyatnitsa S Anatolem Golya: A program broadcast on Fridays at 19:00.
- Azbuka Vkusa: A culinary show airing Sundays at 12:00 in Russian, and Monday through Friday at 09:00 in Romanian.
- Dobroe Utro, Strana / Dimineata La RTR: A morning show airing Monday through Friday at 06:00 in Russian; the Romanian version, Dimineata La RTR, airs on Fridays at 12:00.

== See also ==
- Rossiya 1
- RTR-Planeta
