= Euronova Media Group =

- Type: Radio and television
- Country: Moldova
- Availability: International
- Founded: 1997 by Valeriu Saharneanu; Veaceslav Ţibuleac
- Key people: Valeriu Saharneanu (Chairman)
- Service1: Vocea Basarabiei
- Service2: TV Albasat
- Service3: TV Euronova

The Euronova Media Group trust is a Moldovan group of media companies.

== Overview ==
Euronova Media group includes TV Euronova studio, Vocea Basarabiei radio station, TV Albasat in Nisporeni District, and TV Euronova in Ungheni District.

According to Valeriu Saharneanu, holding director, on the holding station were initiated criminal cases, before July 2009 election.
