= StarNet =

- Company type: JSC
- Industry: Internet service provider
- Founded: 7 August 2003
- Headquarters: Chişinău, Moldova
- Products: Internet services
- Number of employees: 200 As of October 2006
- Website: http://starnet.md/

StarNet is a Moldovan Internet service provider. The company provides Internet services via ADSL and FTTB.

== History ==
Founded on August 7, 2003, on August 18 it was given the license to provide IT services by the National Regulatory Agency in Informational Technologies.

By the end of 2004, Starnet achieved a 30 Mbit/s bandwidth channel and in April 2005 – 55 Mbit/s. In March 2006, the capacity of the MDI-X channel was increased from 100 Mbit/s to 1 Gbit/s. In April 2006, ADSL2+ technology was launched. Then there was an attempt to launch a VoIP service, which was however unsuccessful. The second VoIP service was launched on June 1, 2010, being named StarVoice.

In May 2006, the number of employees reached 100 people. In 2006, the external channel also reached a capacity of 100 Mbit/s.

In August of 2006, the construction of the fiber optic network in the sector of Buiucani in Chișinău began. Along with the increasing number of the subscribers, the number of employees also rose, reaching 200 people. On October 25, StarNet won the prize “Excellence in Business Management-Europe 2006” offered by the “Magazine of Tourism, Industry & Commerce” from Spain.

By the end of 2008, almost all districts of Chișinău became covered with fiber optic cable, offering its subscribers a speed of 100 Mbit/s in the local network. The speed of the external channel reached 2.6 Gbit/s. At the beginning of 2009, the external channel reached over 3 Gbit/s.

On March 1, 2011, the external channel of StarNet reached a capacity of 40 Gbit/s.
