= Vocea Basarabiei =

Romanian-language radio station in Moldova

Vocea Basarabiei Voice of Bessarabia
- Type: Radio network
- Country: Moldova
- Availability: National
- Licence area: Moldova
- Owner: Euro Nova
- Key people: Valeriu Saharneanu
- Launch date: 18 June 2000
- Official website: voceabasarabiei.md

Vocea Basarabiei (English: Voice of Bessarabia) is a Romanian language radio station in Moldova.

== History ==
Vocea Basarabiei was launched on 18 June 2000 in Nisporeni. The Audiovisual Coordinating Council refused in 2002 and 2003 to register Vocea Basarabiei. On 15 January 2005 the station began to broadcast from Chişinău, the capital of the Republic of Moldova.

The radio station is broadcasting in Chişinău on 71.57; in Nisporeni on 105.7; in Glodeni on 100.3; in Taraclia on 101.9; in Soroca on 67.69 and 103.1; in Drochia and Pelinia on 101.0; in Ştefan Vodă on 103.8; in Căuşeni on 91.9; Vulcăneşti on 106.7; Rezina on 101.9; Străşeni on 102.3; Glodeni on 101.3; Satelit - Eutelsat: 11 111.1280 MH

== Notable people ==
- Valeriu Saharneanu
- Petru Bogatu
- Dan Dungaciu
- Valeriu Matei
- Veaceslav Țâbuleac
- Nicolae Negru
- Aurelian Silvestru
- Petru Hadârcă
- Victor Rusu
- Arcadie Gherasim
- Mihai Stolnic
- Vitalie Enache
- Stela Popa
- Vlad Lupan
- Victor Cobăsneanu
