= List of Romanian-language television channels =

This is a list of television channels that broadcast for a Romanian language audience. Typically, non-Romanian content is subtitled, but maintains the original language soundtrack. Non-Romanian programming intended for children, is however, usually dubbed into Romanian. Regardless of intended audience, many shows receive a Romanian title, which is used in programme schedules.

== Other countries ==
Country	Name	Owner	Notes
Serbia	Radio Television of Vojvodina	Government of Serbia	airs 7 hours a week in the Romanian language
