= Albasat TV =

- Country: Moldova
- Headquarters: Nisporeni, Moldova

Programming
- Language: Romanian

Ownership
- Owner: Euronova Media Grup

History
- Launched: 1995

Albasat TV is a television station in Moldova. Its headquarters are in Nisporeni.

It provides news from a number areas of public interest. Albasat TV is a member of Euronova Media Group. The director of Albasat TV is Efim Bardan.
