= National Regulatory Agency for Electronic Communications and Information Technology of the Republic of Moldova =

Coordinates: 47°01′24″N 28°50′07″E

National Regulatory Agency for Electronic Communications and Information Technology (ANRCETI) is a central public regulatory authority of the Government of Moldova that regulates telecommunications and informatics services.

The Agency exercises its regulatory functions in order to implement the telecommunications and informatics Development Strategy, to ensure universal service, to ensure interconnection between telecommunications and informatics networks and services, to protect users, and to promote fair competition in these sectors.
