= Publika TV =

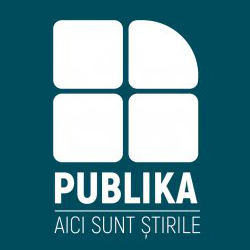
- Country: Moldova
- Broadcast area: National
- Headquarters: Chișinău

Programming
- Language(s): Romanian, Russian

Ownership
- Owner: General Media Group

History
- Launched: 7 April 2010
- Closed: 30 October 2023 (license suspended)

Links
- Website: publika.md

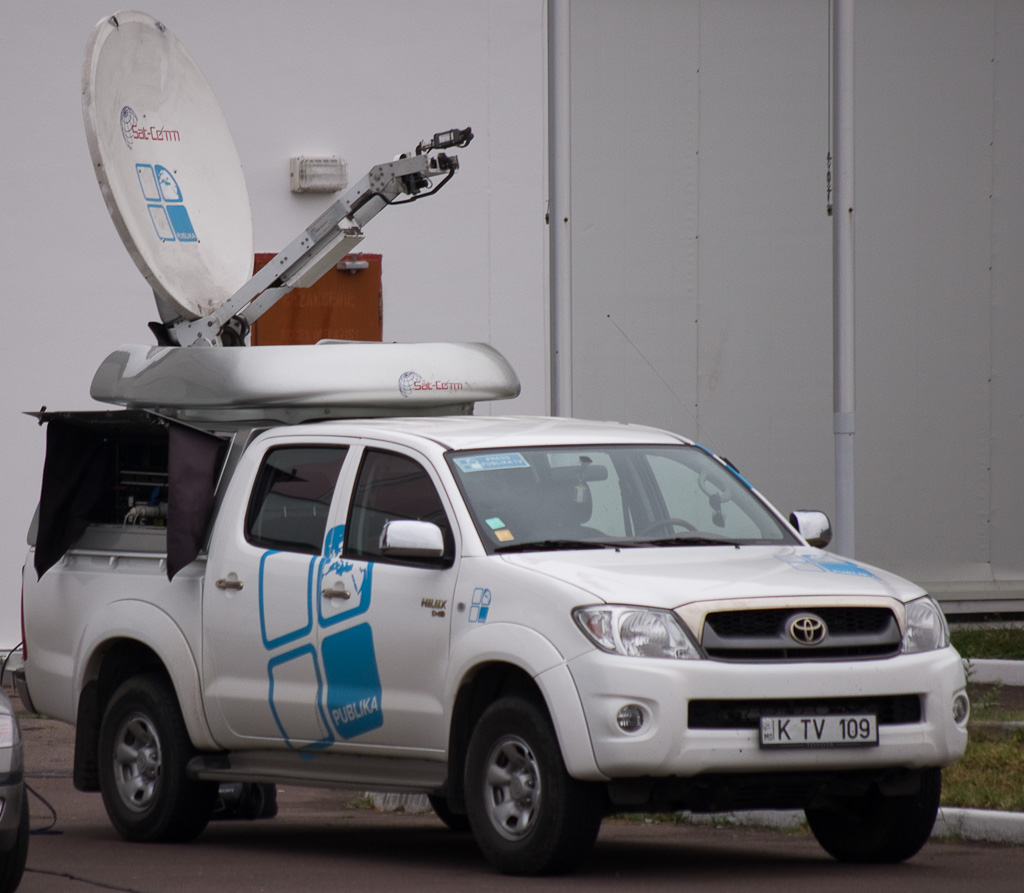
A Publika TV car

Publika TV was a Moldovan broadcast news television station. It was launched on April 7, 2010, their founders being the Romanian businessman Sorin Ovidiu Vîntu and the Moldovan businessman Vladimir Plahotniuc.

It is the second news TV channel from Moldova, after Jurnal TV (later this was transformed into a generalist station). It is currently the only news TV station, which produces and broadcasts content in Romanian, and Russian. On September 12, 2017, the television channel was relaunched, and the slogan was changed from "Spune ce gândești" ("Say what you think") to "Aici sunt știrile" ("Here are the news"). Its license was suspended on October 30, 2023, but it continued online until a few days later.
