= Moldcell =

Moldovan mobile network operator

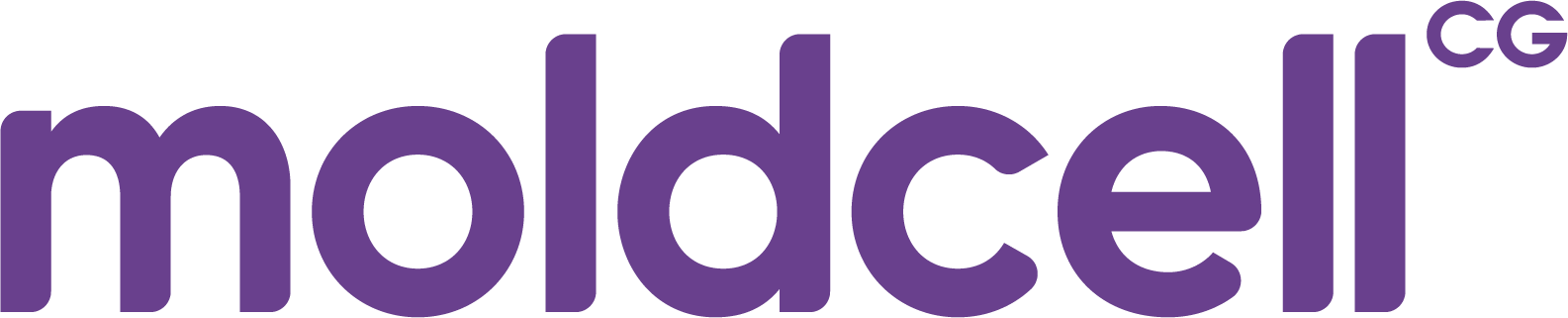
- Company type: private company
- Industry: Mobile telecommunications
- Founded: 2000
- Headquarters: Chișinău, Moldova
- Key people: Carolina Bugaian
- Owner: CG Corp Global
- Website: www.moldcell.md

Moldcell is a Moldovan mobile network operator and is a subsidiary of Nepalese company CG Corp Global. It works in GSM, UMTS and LTE standards.

== General information ==
Moldcell is a mobile telecommunications operator in Republic of Moldova, part of the CG Cell Technologies DAC group located in Nepal. In February 2020, the former owner of Moldcell, Telia Company, announced the sale of 100% of the shares held in Moldcell to CG Cell Technologies DAC, wholly owned by CG Corp Global. The transaction was completed on March 25, 2020, and CG Cell Technologies DAC is now officially the new owner of Moldcell. Moldcell launched its commercial activity in 2000. At present, Moldcell has over 1 million subscribers.

== History ==
Moldcell Logo 2000—2002

On April 28, 2000, Moldcell opened its first sales office in Chisinau, at the address: 55, Tighina Street. The same year, the mobile operator launched for the first time in Moldova the SMS service and the first prepaid package. The first logo was representing a friendly deer and the first slogan, which subsequently became famous, was „Waiting for us? Here we are!”.
On its fifth anniversary, Moldcell launches the twenty four/seven Call Center service (dialing 444 from mobile phone and 022 444 444 from fixed phones). A plan for people with hearing impairments was launched by Moldcell in 2006. Alocard Alternativ was based on text and internet services and had a specialized Call Center Service. In 2007, Moldcell became the first mobile telephony operator to accept electronic payments. In less than a year, the percentage of electronic payments reached 17% and in 2014 – this figure grew to 63%. In 2008, Moldcell commercially launched the 3G services and also this year, it made the first video call from its network.
In 2009, Telia, at that time by name TeliaSonera group, became the first operator at global level to commercially launch the 4G services. In 2012, Moldcell became the first 4G operator in Moldova. Also this year, the company launched, for the first time in Moldova the mSănătate (mHealth) services for several categories of beneficiaries, including pregnant women and young mothers. In 2012, Republic of Moldova became the eighth country in the world to introduce the mobile signature. Moldcell had a strategic contribution in this project, sharing with the local implementers the relevant experience of the Baltic companies from the TeliaSonera group.
The communication platform „Născut în Moldova” (Born in Moldova) was launched by Moldcell in 2013, together with the introduction of the number portability service at national level. Also in 2013, Moldcell offered, for the first time on the local market, an option with unlimited national calls.

== Products and services ==
Cartelă Moldcell – prepaid tariff plans, where the subscriber does not have the obligation to sign contracts or to pay monthly fees. bum – it's a community where subscribers benefit from unlimited calls within the #bum community, free access to social networks, national minutes, SMS and included Internet traffic. Abonament Moldcell –offers unlimited on-net calls, national minutes that can be used for international calls and Roaming and Internet. According to National Regulatory Agency for Electronic Communications and Information Technology (ANRCETI), Moldcell is leader on the Abonament (subscription) segment in Moldova. At national level, the average market share of Abonament and Postpaid is 22.7%, Moldcell market share in this sector stands at 33.26%.
Internet ca lumea – Moldcell offers mobile internet packages, as well as internet via routers and modems, in the 3G and LTE (4G) standards.
Moldcell Business – communication solutions and support for corporate clients. Moldcell provides a wide range of services (Info line, Telemarketing, Telesales, bulk SMS, Transport Management) etc. supporting and developing local and international business.

== Moldcell Foundation ==
Moldcell launched Moldcell Foundation that now unites all the philanthropic and social development initiatives of the company in a unified strategic way.

== 4G Internet Bandwidth ==
Moldcell has 4G network coverage in over 30 regions in Moldova, among which are: Bălți, Bubuieci, Cahul, Călărași, Seliștea Nouă, Căușeni, Ceadîr-Lunga, Chișinău, Codru, Comrat, Cricova, Drochia, Edineț, Fălești, Florești, Grătiești, Hîncești, Ialoveni, Leova, Orhei, Rîșcani, Soroca, Stăuceni, Strășeni, Taraclia, Trușeni, Ungheni, Vulcănești. So far, the following populated areas: Novaci, Cojușna, Bugeac, Măgdăcești, Porumbeni, Hulboaca, Durlești, Dumbrava have only partial 4G coverage.

== Highlights 2014 ==
On August 11, 2014, Moldcell purchased three licenses for the right to use resources of radio - frequency spectrum in 800, 900 and 1800 MHz for the provision of networks and mobile communications services of general use. The licenses were granted for 15 years. With an investment of 25.5 million euros for the purchase of these licenses.
From 2000 to 2014, Moldcell spent 3.7 billion MDL on the development of telecommunication infrastructure. In the same period, the company paid over 1 billion 254 million MDL in taxes and state levies.
From the launch of this service in July 2013, and till late 2014, Moldcell acquired in its network over 60% of the overall number of Moldovan users who decided to change their operator.
Also in late 2014, Moldcell obtained the highest revenues from selling broadband internet services (35.92%).
Moldcell is the single operator on the Moldovan market that continues to stably increase its turnover, from 25.41% in Q4 2012, to 30.39% in Q4 2014.
In 2014, Moldcell became partner of the first innovation lab in Moldova. MiLab works as a multilateral platform to engage actors from different sectors (public, private, non-profit, etc.) to seek and experiment with innovative approaches to the society's problems. MiLab is a joint project of UNDP Moldova, e-Government Center, British Embassy in Chisinau, Moldcell, and other private partners.
