= Moldtelecom =

Moldovan telecommunications company

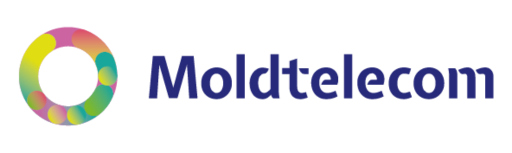
- Type: State-owned
- Industry: Telecommunications
- Founded: April 1, 1993; 33 years ago
- Headquarters: Chişinău, Moldova
- Products: Fixed-line telephony; Mobile telephony; Internet services; IPTV
- Revenue: ▼€75 million (2022)
- Net income: ▼€2 million (2022)
- Number of employees: 2,750 (2019)
- Website: moldtelecom.md

Moldtelecom is a Moldovan state-owned telecommunications company headquartered in Chişinău. In September 2023, Moldtelecom held a dominant position in the fixed-line telephony market (89%). However, its market share was lower in other sectors: broadband internet (56.4%), pay television (55%) and mobile telephony (9%).

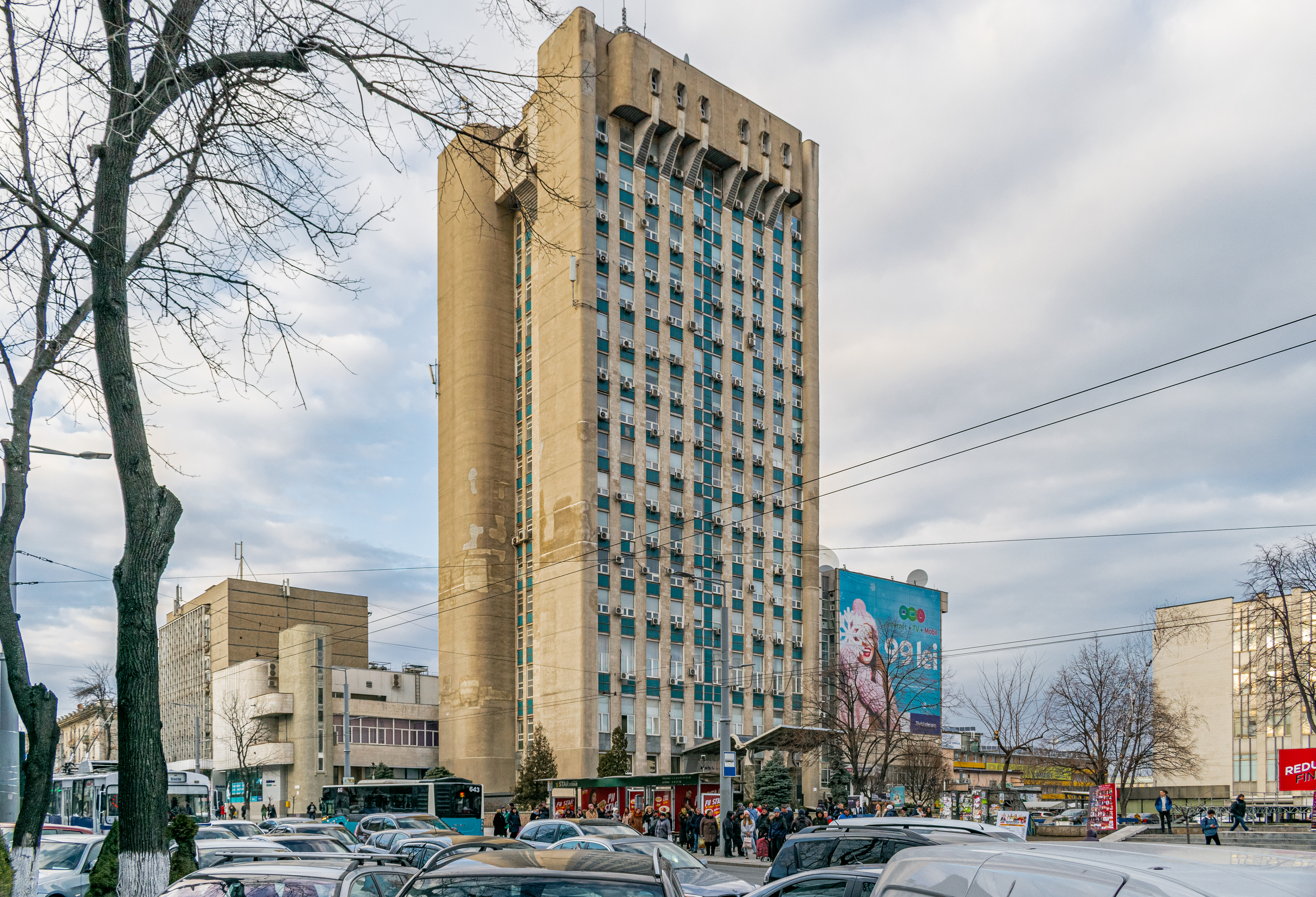
Moldtelecom headquarters

== History ==
On 1 April 1993, following the restructuring of the telecommunications sector in the Republic of Moldova, ‘Moldtelecom’ State-Owned Enterprise was established. On 5 January 1999, the company has been reorganized and became a joint-stock company with the State being the unique founder and stockholder.

== Services ==
=== Fixed-line telephony ===
In its early years, Moldtelecom primarily offered landline phone services under state ownership. As of the first quarter of 2011, it held a 96.5% market share in the fixed-line telephony sector, with approximately 1.124 million subscribers.

In 2002 the Cross-Net digital overlay network was expanded, which allowed for the increase in data transport capacity by 1850 channels equivalent to 64 Kb/s. The telephone prefixes have been changed from 8 to 0 at national level and from 10 to 0 at international level, according to international standards.

=== Internet ===
In 2001 the first internet service using dial-up technology was launched in the Republic of Moldova. The services ‘VIPcall’, ‘IP-telephony’, ‘Videotelephony’ and ‘Public Video Conferencing’ were launched. The national network of digital fiber optic transmissions and SDH multiplexer was launched.

On 1 November 2004 the ‘MaxDSL’, broadband internet via ADSL technology, was launched. In the first quarter of 2011, 169,900 MaxDSL subscribers were registered.

On 16 April 2008, the FTTx fiber optic network began to expand and the ‘MaxFiber’ broadband Internet access service was launched with speeds up to 100 Mbps.

On 17 May 2010 the public WiFi Internet service was launched.

=== Mobile telephony ===
In 2005, the fixed-line telephony service (Wireless Local Loop - WLL) with the commercial name ‘Amplus’ was launched. The service is based on CDMA technology and uses the standard CDMA2000 1X in the frequency band 450 MHz. The advantage of this technology is that it allows for the use of telephone services even in the regions where connection to traditional telephone network is difficult or even impossible. Amplus telephony provides for services similar to traditional telephony: receiving and making calls, accessing the Internet and many other additional services.

In 2006 the construction of the network was completed under the CDMA 2000 standard, in the frequency band 450 MHz, intended for the provision of fixed wireless services and mobile services. Also in 2006, Moldtelecom implements the bus network based on DWDM technology, providing the support necessary for any type of traffic throughout the Republic of Moldova and the IP/MPLS overlapping network, serving as a basis for the development of NGN.

On 1 March 2007 mobile services under the brand of Unité, according to CDMA2000 standard. It uses the CDMA2000 technology in the frequency band 450 MHz exclusively on the market. At the end of 2008, Moldtelecom Mobil provided mobile Internet access to the entire country.

=== Television ===
On 22 February 2010, Moldtelecom launched the first IPTV digital television service in the Republic of Moldova. On 7 December 2010, the high-definition television service was launched for the first time. On June 15, 2011, Moldtelecom introduced DVR features, including pause, resume, and recording functionalities.
