= List of newspapers in Moldova =

Below is a list of newspapers published in Moldova. As of 2016, there were roughly 153 newspapers in Moldova.

- Adevărul (Romanian)
- Anticoruptie.md
- Apropo Magazin (Romanian)
- Asta Da! (Romanian)
- Business Info (Romanian)
- Capitala (Romanian)
- Cuvântul (Romanian)
- Cuvântul Liber (Romanian)
- Deschide.md
- Dnestrovskaya Pravda (Russian)
- Eco (Romanian)
- ECOnomist (Romanian)
- Est Curier (Romanian)
- Expresul de Ungheni (Romanian)
- Fizica găurilor, teleportare si levitare (Russian)
- Flux (Romanian)
- Gazeta de Vest (Romanian)
- Glia Drochiană (Romanian)
- Jurnal de Chişinău (Romanian)
- Kommersant PLUS (Russian)
- Komsomolskaya Pravda v Moldove (Moldovan edition of Russian tabloid Komsomolskaya Pravda)
- Limba Română (Romanian)
- Literatura şi Arta (Romanian)
- Luminătorul (Romanian)
- Makler (Russian)
- Misionarul (Romanian)
- Moldavskie Vedomosti
- Moldova Azi (Romanian)
- Moldova Suverană (Romanian)
- Molodezh Moldovy (Russian and Romanian)
- NewsMaker
- Nokta
- Noi.md
- Observatorul de Nord (Romanian)
- Ora Locală (Romanian)
- Otdyhai s Futbolom (Russian)
- Plai Sângerean (Romanian)
- Relax with Football (Russian)
- Săptămîna (Romanian)
- Sport Plus (Romanian)
- Sud-Est (Romanian magazine)
- Sud Expres (Romanian)
- Timpul (Romanian)
- Trudovoi Tiraspol (Russian)
- Unghiul (Romanian)
- Viaţa Basarabiei (Romanian)
- Ziarul de Gardă (Romanian)
- Ziarulnational.md

== Defunct ==
- Ardealul (Romanian)
- Basarabia (Romanian)
- Basarabia Reînnoită (Romanian)
- Contrafort (Romanian)
- Cuvânt moldovenesc (Romanian)
- Cuvânt moldovenesc (Romanian magazine)
- Democraţia (Romanian)
- Deşteptarea (Romanian)
- Făclia Ţării (Romanian)
- Gazeta Românească (Romanian)
- Glasul (Romanian)
- Glasul Basarabiei (Romanian)
- România Nouă (Romanian)
- Russian Proriv! (Transnistrian newspaper) (Russian, 2007–2012)
- Şcoala Moldovenească (Romanian)
- Sfatul Țării (Romanian, 1917–20)
- Sfatul Țării (Romanian)
- Ţara (Romanian)
- Viaţa Basarabiei, 1907 (Romanian)

== See also ==
- Moldpres, state news agency
