= Nicolae Negru =

Moldovan writer and journalist

Nicolae Negru OR
- Born: 14 October 1948 (age 77); Ciutulești, Moldavian SSR, Soviet Union
- Occupation: Journalist
- Employer(s): Vocea Basarabiei; Jurnal TV; Jurnal de Chișinău
- Website: bogatu.voceabasarabiei.net

Nicolae Negru (born 14 October 1948) is a writer and journalist from Moldova. He works for Jurnal TV, Vocea Basarabiei, and Jurnal de Chișinău.

== Biography ==
Negru was born on 14 October 1948, in Ciutulești, Florești District. He graduated from the Technical University of Moldova in Chișinău in 1970. He is a member of Moldovan Writers' Union, Romanian Writers' Union and Union of Journalists of Moldova. He has worked for Moldova-Film, Nistru-Basarabia, Literatura și Arta, and Columna and has been published in Contrafort, Contrapunct (Bucharest), and Convorbiri Literare (Iași)

Nicolae Negru and Petru Bogatu are the best known editorialists of Jurnal de Chișinău.

== Awards ==
- Jury Prize for "Minte-mă, minte-mă", Satiricus IL Caragiale Theater Gala 2008
- Second prize for "Femeia invizibilă", at the National Dramaturgy Contest, organized by the Ministry of Culture and Tourism of the Republic of Moldova

== Works ==
- "Minte-mă, minte-mă…", 1999
- "Femeia invizibilă"
- "Actorul Crap, 2007"
- "Revine Marea Sarmațiană și ne întoarcem în Carpați" staged at the Mateevici Theater in 1998 (Editura Arc, 1998)
