= Butnaru =

Butnaru is a surname. Notable people with the surname include:

- Leo Butnaru (born 1949), Moldovan writer
- Val Butnaru (born 1955), Moldovan journalist and writer
- Valentina Butnaru (born 1958), Moldovan journalist and activist
