= Ion Vatamanu =

Moldovan politician (1937–1993)

Ion Vatamanu OR
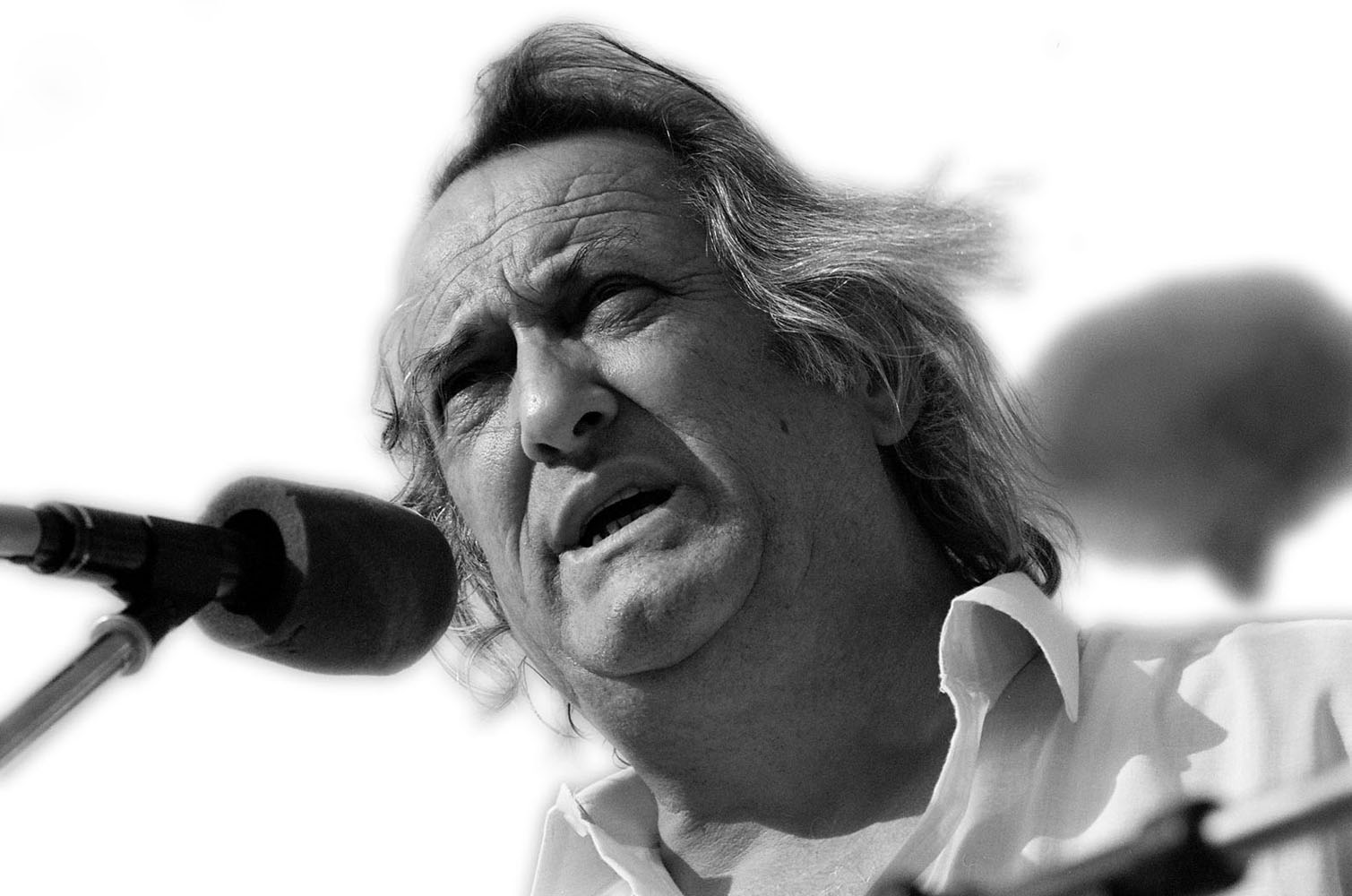
- Vatamanu in 1990
- Born: 1 May 1937; Costiceni, Kingdom of Romania (now Kostychany, Ukraine)
- Died: 9 August 1993 (aged 56); Chișinău, Moldova
- Education: Moldova State University
- Political party: Popular Front of Moldova
- Spouse: Elena Curicheru
- Children: Mihaela, Mariana, Leontina
- Awards: Order of the Republic (Moldova)

Ion Vatamanu (1 May 1937 – 9 August 1993) was a chemist, writer, and politician from Moldova. He served as member of the Parliament of Moldova (1990–1994) and chairman of the Committee on Culture of the Parliament of Moldova.

== Biography ==
He was born on 1 May 1937 in the Costiceni commune of Hotin County (today, Chernivtsi Raion, Chernivtsi Oblast), in the family of Ion and Maria Vatamanu. He graduated from the 7th grade school in his native village, then, attended the middle school in the village of Vancicăuți, which he graduated in 1954.

- From 1954 to 1955 he worked as a teacher at the Costiceni school.
- In 1955–1960, he studied at the Moldova State University in Chișinău in the Faculty of Chemistry.
- In 1962, he had his debut with the book of poems "First snowflakes".
- In 1960, he married Elena Curicheru, a student of philology and a future interpreter, the daughter of Mihail Curicheru, a Bessarabian writer deported to Siberia, where he died in 1943.
- In 1971, Vatamanu obtained a Ph.D. degree in Chemistry from the University of Lviv, with thesis Oscillopolographic study of the complexes Bi (3+), Zn (2+), Sb (3+) with appropriate ligands and application of these complexes in analytical chemistry.
- In 1973, he was elected as the head of the laboratory at the Chemistry Institute of the Academy of Science of the Republic of Moldova, this position he held to the end of his life. In all these years of his chemistry career, 1980–1989, Vatamanu published more than 150 scientific papers in the field of analytical chemistry, and received five patents in the field of oscillopolography. Several methods developed by Ion Vatamanu were applied in agriculture and industry of the former Soviet Union and Moldova, at the testing lands in the Telenești and Anenii Noi districts.
- In 1978 he published, in collaboration with other scientific workers of the Chemistry Laboratory, the Bibliographic Index of the Polarography Literature (1922–1977).
- In 1988 he wrote a monograph on Thermodynamics of hydrolysis of metal ions in collaboration with the young Ph.D. in chemistry Ilie Fitic.
- From 1989 to 1991, together with the poet Leonida Lari, he headed the Glasul newspaper, the first Latin-based post-war newspaper in the Republic of Moldova, printed in Latvia with the support of the Dacia Society.
- Between 1991 and 1993 he held the position of the director of the Columna magazine.
- In 1990 he was the MP in the first Parliament of the Republic of Moldova and the chairman of the Parliamentary Committee on Culture and Religious Affairs. He signed the Declaration of Independence of the Republic of Moldova.

He died on 9 August 1993 and was buried in the Central Orthodox Cemetery of Chișinău. His grave is a monument in Chișinău.

== Awards ==
- Diploma Televiziunii Moldovenești pentru ciclul de emisiuni "Abeceul moralei".

== Honours ==
- The Award Ion Vatamanu "for love of truth and freedom"
- "Ion Vatamanu" High School, Strășeni

== Works ==
- Primii fulgi, prezentat de Nicolae Costenco, - Chișinău, Editura Cartea Moldovenească.
- Monologuri (1964), - Chișinău, Editura Cartea Moldovenească.
- Liniștea Cuvintelor (1971).
- Ora păsării (1974), - Chișinău, Editura Cartea Moldovenească.
- De ziua frunzei (1977), prefață de Grigore Vieru, - Chișinău, Editura Literatura Artistică.
- Iubire de tine (1981).
- Măslinul oglindit (1983).
- Aventurile lui Atomică (1966), - Chișinău, Editura Cartea Moldovenească.
- Teiul (1980).
- Izvorul cu ochi verzi (1985).
- La mijlocul ierbii (1967), prefață de George Meniuc, - Chișinău, Editura Lumina.

== Bibliography ==
- "Literatura și arta Moldovei: Encicl.", Vol. 1. - Chișinău, 1985.
- Mihai Cimpoi, O istorie deschisă a literaturii române din Basarabia. - Chișinău, 1996.
- "Chișinău Enciclopedie" - Editura Museum, Chișinău, 1997.
- Sergiu P. Palii, In memoriam Ion Vatamanu (Commemorating the 75th birth anniversary), Chemistry Journal of Moldova, 2012, Vol. 7(2), pag. 7-8.
