= Cuvântul (disambiguation) =

Cuvântul (Romanian for "The Word") may refer to:

- Cuvântul, a daily newspaper published by Nae Ionescu during the 1930s
- Cuvântul (literary magazine)
- Cuvântul (Moldovan newspaper), published in Rezina

== See also ==
- Cuvântul Liber (disambiguation)
