= Sfatul Țării (disambiguation) =

Sfatul Țării may refer to:

- Sfatul Țării, the National Assembly (parliament) of Bessarabia in 1917–1918
- Sfatul Țării Palace
- 1917 Sfatul Țării election

== Newspapers ==
- Sfatul Țării (newspaper, 1917–20), the newspaper of Sfatul Țării, 1917–1920
- Sfatul Țării (newspaper), a newspaper of the Parliament of Moldova in the 1990s
