= Petru Bogatu =

Moldovan journalist (1951–2020)

Petru Bogatu OR
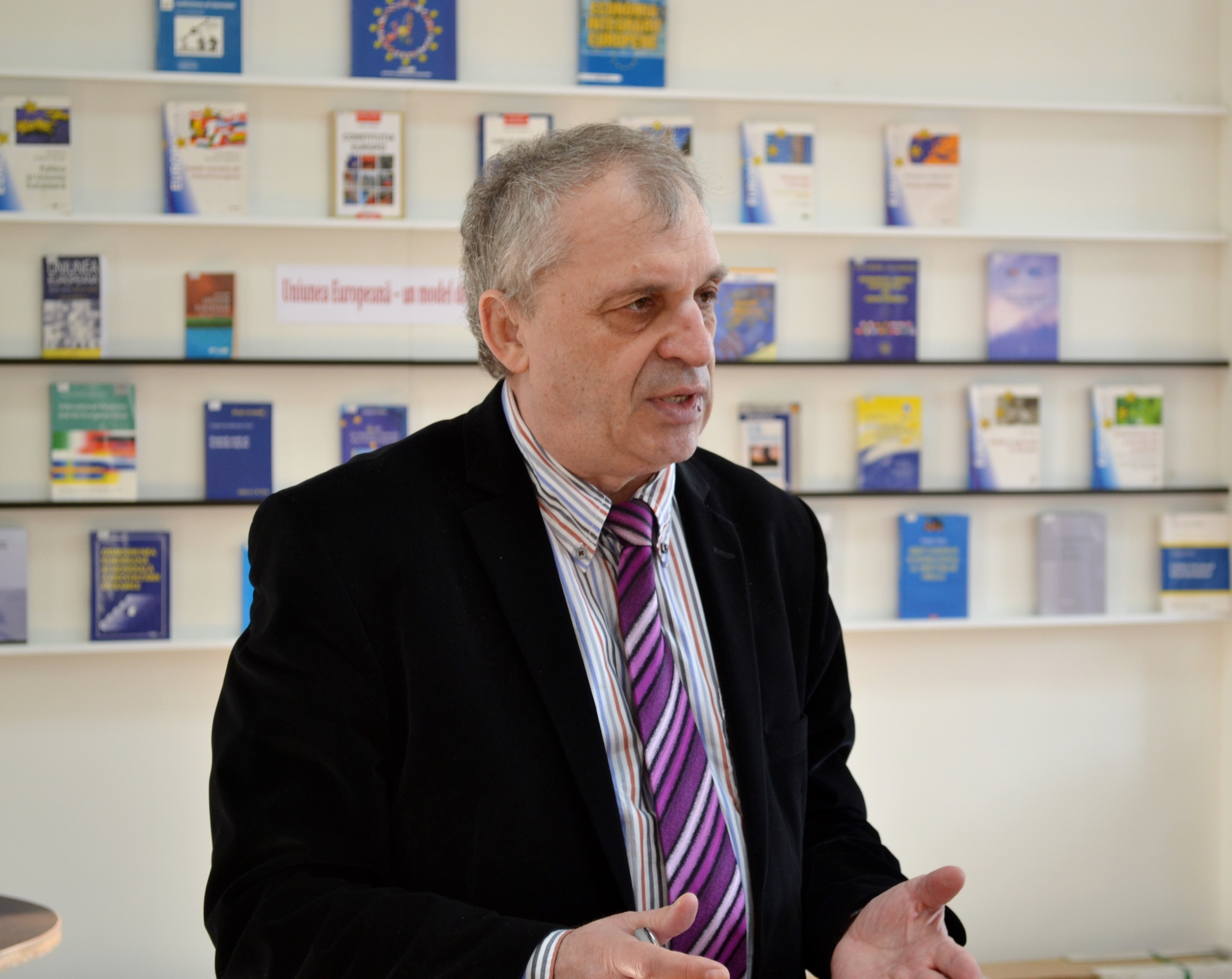
- Bogatu in 2013
- Born: 12 July 1951; Slobozia, Moldavian SSR, Soviet Union
- Died: 22 March 2020 (aged 68); Chișinău, Moldova
- Citizenship: Romania; Moldova
- Occupations: Journalist, writer, lecturer
- Employer(s): Moldova State University; Jurnal TV; Jurnal de Chişinău; Prime
- Spouse: Viorica Cucereanu
- Children: 2

Petru Bogatu (12 July 1951 – 22 March 2020) was a journalist, essayist, political analyst and writer from the Republic of Moldova, unionist and pro-occidental orientation, editorialist at the National Newspaper, professor at the State University of Moldova, Faculty of Journalism and Communication Sciences.

Together with six other experts from Romania, the Netherlands and the Republic of Moldova, Bogatu was co-author of the book "Twitter Revolution, First Episode: Republic of Moldova", which is a synthesis of the April 2009 anti-communist protests in data, images and investigations. He wrote the fiction novel The rope braided in three, a parable of police intrigue about the geopolitical confrontations from the beginning of the third millennium, seen from an ethical, teleological and historical perspective.

== Biography ==
Petru Bogatu was born on 12 July 1951 in Slobozia. He was a graduate of the Bălți Education Institute and a Rostov-on-Don institute. Bogatu was a journalist since 1975. He was a correspondent and then editor of Satul Nou, based in Slobozia (currently in the Transnistrian region); an editor, commentator, and deputy editor-in-chief at the Moldovan Public Television Moldova 1, deputy editor-in-chief of Ţara newspaper, political analyst and editor-in-chief at Flux newspaper. Bogatu also taught in the State University of Moldova's Department of Journalism and Communication Sciences.

He served as vice president of the Popular Front of Moldova (1990–1992). From 1995 to 2000, he was named the most popular journalist in the Republic of Moldova. According to the "50+1 Journalists" directory, Petru Bogatu's editorial writing is considered a benchmark in the Moldovan media landscape. He was awarded the Order of the Republic of Moldova (2009) and the Order of Merit for Culture, with the rank of Commander, in Romania (2014). Later he worked for Vocea Basarabiei (2009), Jurnal TV (2009). He left Jurnal Trust Media in September 2013.

Bogatu was also a political commentator and op-ed writer for the Ziarul Național newspaper. Since 2016 he was a producer and presenter of the TV program "Cronica lui Bogatu" (English: Chronicles of Bogatu) on Prime TV channel.

He died on 22 March 2020, in Chișinău.

== Controversy ==
In October 2015 Petru Bogatu, as an op-ed columnist for Ziarul Național, wrote hard criticism of Vladimir Plahotniuc's address, stating that he [Plahotniuc] "has usurped the central country's administration", and "has subordinate to him prosecutora and judges, subjugating this way country's constitutional institutions. As a result, he transformed the state into a private firm, and the justice – into a gestapo for the intimidation and burial of his political opponents". Next year Bogatu began his work at Prime TV, a channel owned by Plahotniuc.

== Books ==
- 2008 – "Investigative Journalism" (manual) ISBN 978-9975-80-188-1
- 2012 – "Cord of Three Strands" (novel) ISBN 978-9975-53-157-3

== Bibliography ==
- Republica Moldova: 50+1 jurnalişti ISBN 9975-65-076-3
