= Botnari =

Botnari is a surname. Notable people with the surname include:

- Anatolie Botnari (born 1950), Moldovan bishop
- Vasile Botnari (born 1975), Moldovan economist and politician

== See also ==
- Botnaru
- Butnaru
