= Dumeni =

Dumeni may refer to:

- Dumeni, a village in Duruitoarea Nouă Commune, Rîşcani district, Moldova
- Dumeni, a village in George Enescu Commune, Botoşani County, Romania
- Dumeni, the Romanian name for Dumeny village, Kostychany Commune, Novoselytsia Raion, Ukraine
