= Viorica Cucereanu =

Moldovan journalist

Viorica Cucereanu-Bogatu
- Born: 9 May 1957 (age 68)
- Occupation: Journalist
- Employer: TeleRadio-Moldova
- Known for: TV presenter
- Spouse: Petru Bogatu (died 2020)
- Children: 2
- Awards: Best TV presenter (TeleRadio-Moldova)

Viorica Cucereanu-Bogatu (born 9 May 1957) is a journalist from the Republic of Moldova. She is the Secretary of the Supervisory Board of PNAC TeleRadio-Moldova since 2009.

== Biography ==
Viorica Cucereanu graduated from Moldova State University in 1979 and worked for TeleRadio-Moldova (August 1979 - November 2004). She was active during the 2002 strike at TeleRadio-Moldova. Her dismissal in 2004 was illegal, according to the European Court of Human Rights.

She works for Euro TV Moldova (November 2005 – February 2007), TV Euronova (April – October 2005), Moldova Urbană (May – December 2005, April – December 2006). Viorica Cucereanu contributed to Timpul de dimineaţă, Jurnal de Chişinău, Ziarul de Gardă, Flux, VIP-Magazin, Zece Plus. Since June 2007, she has been editor in chief of "Akademos", a magazine of the Academy of Sciences of Moldova.

== Awards ==
- 1992 – Best TV presenter (TeleRadio-Moldova)
- 1998 – first prize, the annual Ziaristelor Club "Ten Plus"
- 1993, 2001, 2002, 2003, 2007 Academy of Sciences of Moldova Award "Archimedean lever"
- 2001 – National Prize in journalism for 2000
- 2002 – first prize in the contest "10 years of United Nations in Moldova"
- 2005 – Winner of Contest for the best reflection of the gender theme in the press, organized by the Gender Centre of Moldova
- 2006 – second prize for the film parallel world of the deaf, VI International Festival of Documentary Film "Chronograph", Chisinau

== Works ==
- Femeia în labirintul istoriei (2003),
- Democraţia la feminin (2005),
- Femeia în zonele de conflict (2006),
- Ispita neuitării (about Prometeu-Prim Lyceum) (2006)

== Films ==
- 16 zile de combatere a violenţei împotriva femeii, 2001
- Oraşul Bălţi, parametrii asistenţei sociale, (1999).
- filme instructive pentru fermieri la solicitarea ONG “Bios” (2000).
- Femeia, măsură a democraţiei, (2002).

== Bibliography ==
- Enciclopedia Femeile Moldovei, editura Muzeum, 2000
