= Nokta (Moldova) =

Moldovan news website

- Website type: Online newspaper
- Available in: Russian
- Headquarters: Comrat, {{{location_country}}}
- Founder: Mihail Sirkeli
- Website: nokta.md
- Launched: 26 December 2017; 8 years ago
- Current status: Active

Nokta is an independent news website in Gagauzia, an autonomous region in Moldova for the Gagauz people. It was founded by Mihail Sirkeli, who was its manager as of 2024. Headquartered in Comrat, the news website is in Russian; a large proportion of Gagauz do not speak Romanian, Moldova's national language.

Nokta was launched on 26 December 2017 by the Piligrim-Demo Association. It aimed to cover the most important events in Gagauzia, but also in the rest of Moldova and in the world. Nokta journalist Veaceslav Crăciun stated that the website would distinguish itself from other media outlets in Gagauzia because the team would be publicly presented and its authors would sign the articles. As of 2024, Nokta was funded primarily by the United States Department of State, the Netherlands and the United States' National Endowment for Democracy.

Balkan Insight defined Nokta as an influential independent media outlet in Gagauzia, one of the few independent media outlets in the region, which frequently criticized local authorities and exposed cases of corruption. As of 2024, Nokta was the only explicitly pro-European medium in Gagauzia, according to SWI swissinfo. Nokta was awarded the National Award for Journalistic Ethics and Deontology by the Press Council of the Republic of Moldova in 2023. In 2024, the Romanian NGO Center for Independent Journalism (CJI) evaluated Nokta as the third most credible news website in Moldova out of a total of 40 websites evaluated, being behind NewsMaker and TV8. The next year, the CJI rated Nokta as the most credible media institution in Moldova.

On a 5–11 May 2020 nationwide (except Transnistria) poll by CBS Research, which interviewed 1,003 people, 0.7% of respondents listed Nokta as one of the three news websites they read the most. On a 15 December 2022 – 13 January 2023 nationwide (except Transnistria) poll by Magenta Consulting, with a sample of 1,374 people, 19% of respondents who declared Gagauz as their primary language listed Nokta among the news websites they used at least once a week, while 9% stated that Nokta was among the news websites they trusted the most; it scored much lower (0–1%) in both aspects among the rest of the demographic groups of the poll.

== See also ==
- List of newspapers in Moldova
