= Ștefan Secăreanu =

Moldovan politician (born 1959)

Member of the Moldovan Parliament
- In office 21 April 1998 – 22 April 2009
- Parliamentary group: Democratic Convention; Christian-Democratic People's Party

Personal details
- Born: 8 January 1959 (age 67) Chioselia Mare, Moldavian SSR, Soviet Union
- Party: Christian-Democratic People's Party (Moldova)
- Other political affiliations: Popular Front of Moldova
- Education: Moldova State University

Ștefan Secăreanu (born 8 January 1959) is a journalist and politician from Moldova.

== Biography ==
Ștefan Secăreanu graduated from Moldova State University and worked for TeleRadio-Moldova. He was the editor in chief of Deșteptarea (1989–1990) and Țara. He served as a member of the Parliament of Moldova (1998–2009).
