= Rodica Mahu =

Moldovan journalist

- Born: 18 July 1959 (age 67); Orhei, Moldavian SSR, Soviet Union
- Occupation: Journalist
- Known for: Journalistic activity
- Parent(s): Gheorghe (b 29 April 1925), Margareta
- Awards: The "Golden Apple"

Rodica Mahu (born 18 July 1959) is a journalist from the Republic of Moldova. She is the editor in chief of Jurnal de Chişinău.

On 10 April 2009, Rodica Mahu was kidnapped while sending information for the publications' website through the phone from behind the Government building; she was interrogated by the police and released after two hours. South East Europe Media Organisation was alarmed about the kidnapping.

== Awards ==
- The "Golden Apple", the Top 10 Journalists Gala 2010.
