= Chioselia Mare =

- Commune and village
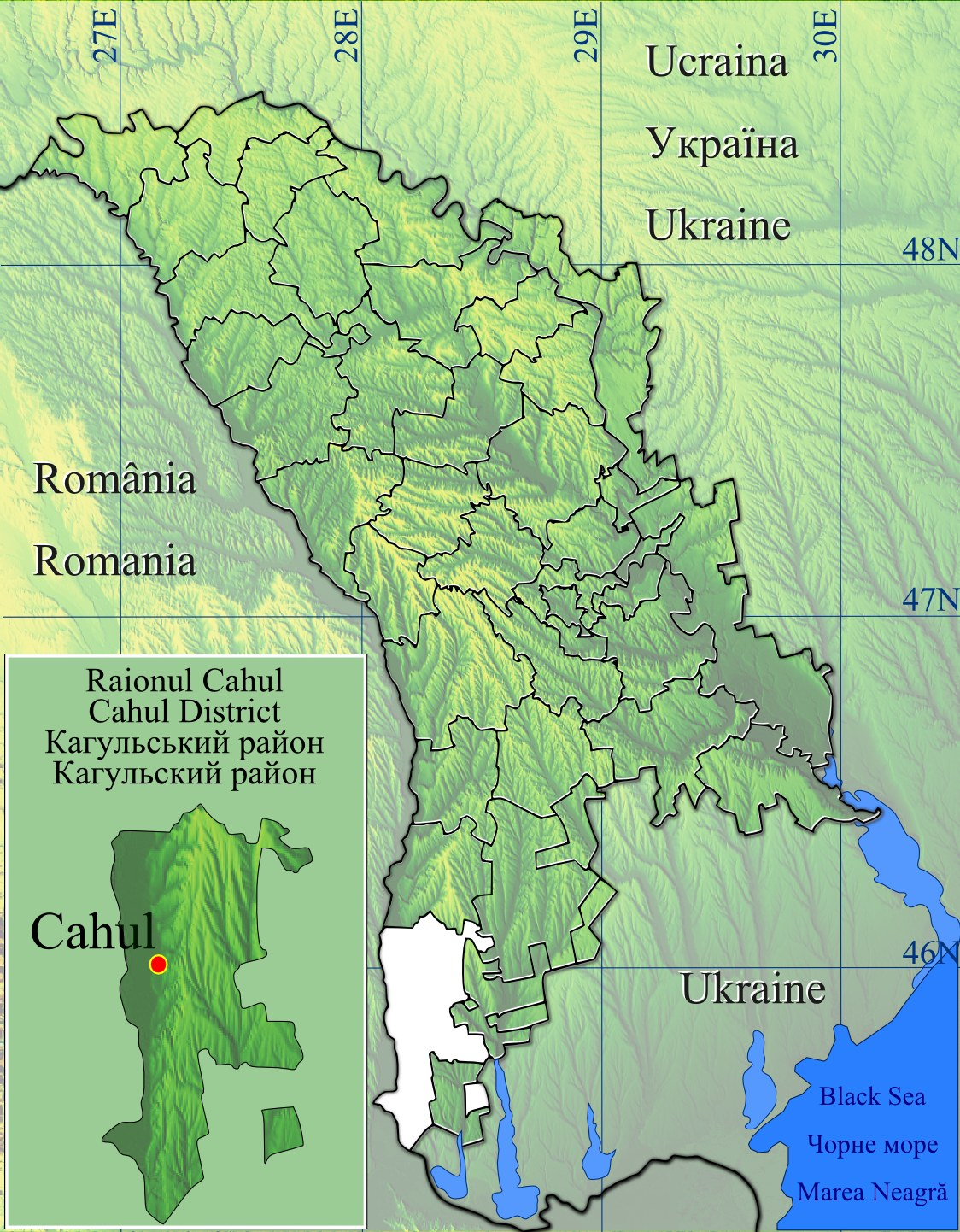
- Location of village within Moldova
- Coordinates: 46°6′7″N 28°29′13″E
- Country: Moldova
- District: Cahul District

Population (2014)
  - Total: 1,798
- Time zone: UTC+2 (EET)
  - Summer (DST): UTC+3 (EEST)

Chioselia Mare is a commune in Cahul District, Moldova. It is composed of two villages, Chioselia Mare and Frumușica.

== Notable people ==
- Ștefan Secăreanu
