= Sergiu Burcă =

Moldovan journalist and politician

Member of the Moldovan Parliament
- In office 1998–2001

Personal details
- Born: 8 July 1961 (age 65) Ciutulești
- Party: Social Liberal Party (Moldova)
- Other political affiliations: Christian-Democratic People's Party (Moldova); Popular Front of Moldova
- Education: Moldova State University

Sergiu Burcă (born 8 July 1961, Ciutulești, Florești District) is a journalist and politician from Moldova.

== Biography ==
Sergiu Burcă graduated from Moldova State University in 1984 and worked for TeleRadio-Moldova and the Romanian Literature Museum, Chişinău. He worked as a correspondent of Radio Moldova Youth Editorial Board, and from 1986 to 1990 was senior scientific collaborator at the Museum of Literature in Cantemir. He was the deputy editor in chief of Deşteptarea (1989–1990) and Ţara (1990–1994).

Burcă was involved in the early formations of the Christian-Democratic People's Party and was its executive chairman from 1994 to 1999. He later served as a member of the Parliament of Moldova, chief of the Parliamentary Delegation of the Republic of Moldova to the NATO Parliamentary Assembly(1998–2001). He was expelled from the party in 2005 for his opposition to its endorsement of Vladimir Voronin as president. The following year he joined the Social Liberal Party, which he was a member of until 2008, when he retired following the party;s merging into the Democratic Party of Moldova.
