= Cuvântul Liber =

Cuvântul Liber (Romanian for "The Free Word") is the name of several Romanian newspapers:

- Cuvântul Liber (1924) - weekly published by Eugen Filotti (1924–1925)
- Cuvântul Liber (1933) - weekly published by Tudor Teodorescu-Braniște (1933–1936)
- Cuvântul Liber (Hunedoara) - contemporary newspaper published in Hunedoara
- Cuvântul Liber (Târgu Mureș) - contemporary newspaper published in Târgu Mureș
- Cuvântul Liber (Leova) - contemporary newspaper published in Leova
