= Vorniceni, Strășeni =

Vorniceni
- Village
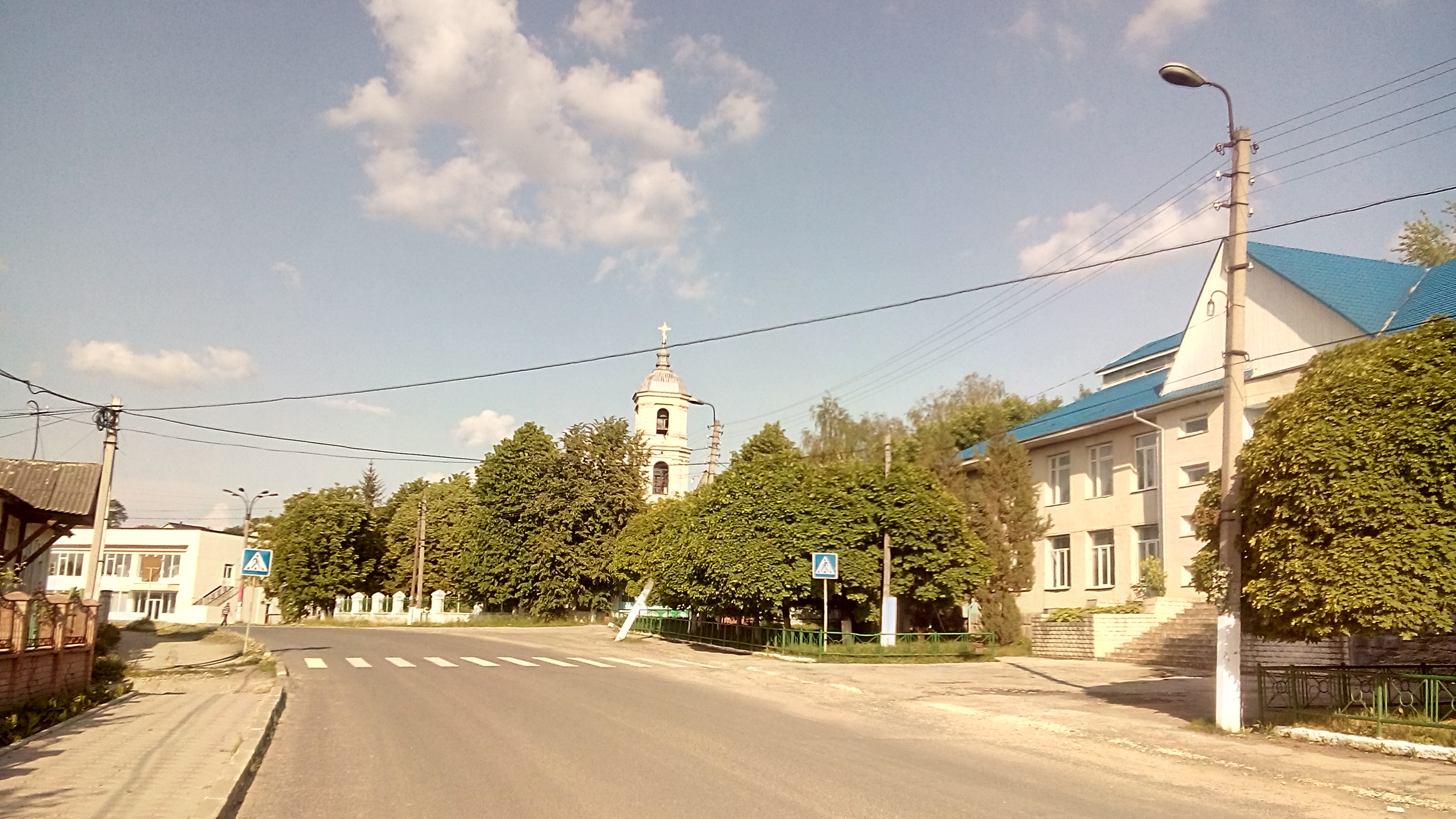

- Location in Moldova
- Coordinates: 47°09′N 28°26′E
- Country: Moldova
- District: Strășeni District

Population (2014 census)
  - Total: 4,064
- Time zone: UTC+2 (EET)
  - Summer (DST): UTC+3 (EEST)

Vorniceni is a village in Strășeni District, Moldova. Population 4,064 as of 2014.

== Notable people ==
- Valentina Butnaru (born 1958), journalist and activist
- Alexandru Cosmescu (1922 – 1989), journalist, writer and anthologist
