= Ciutulești =

- Commune
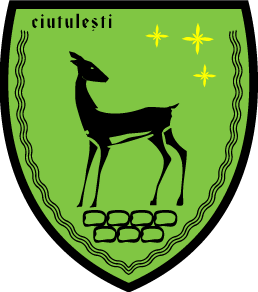
- Coat of arms

- Location in Moldova
- Coordinates: 47°45′N 28°23′E
- Country: Moldova
- District: Florești District
- Elevation: 499 ft (152 m)

Population (2014)
  - Total: 2,972
- Time zone: UTC+2 (EET)
  - Summer (DST): UTC+3 (EEST)
- Postal code: MD-5016
- Area code: +373 250
- Website: Official site

Ciutulești is a commune in Florești District, Moldova. It is composed of four villages: Ciutulești, Ion Vodă, Mărinești and Sîrbești.

== History ==
The chronicler Miron Costin (1633–1691) had a country seat here.

== Notable people ==
- Sergiu Burcă
- Nicolae Casso (1839–1904)
- Nicolae Negru
- Nicolae Timofti
