= Mariana Rață =

Moldovan journalist

Mariana Raţă
- Born: Chișinău, Moldavian SSR, Soviet Union
- Occupations: Journalist, host Cutia Neagră talk show, tv8
- Children: 1
- Awards: The Best journalist of Moldova-2013, Best journalistic corruption investigations”, UNDP of 2016, Shortlist of 2017 European Press Prize at „Investigation Award”,"Omul anului 2019" Vip Magazin magazine

Mariana Raţă (born 20 August 1984) is an investigative and TV journalist from Moldova. She is the founder of the Media Alternativa association, which holds the license of the independent television station TV8. Rață is Senior Editor at TV8, responsible for the editorial policy of TV8 media products. Since 2017, Rață is the host of the political talk show Cutia Neagră (Black Box), and since 2020, she is also the director of the investigation show Cutia Neagră PLUS. Both are broadcast by TV8. Since 2017, Rață is the chairman of the Board of Directors of the Center for Independent Journalism in Moldova.

Until 2017, Rață was Coordinating Editor at the Centre for Investigative Journalism of Moldova. She has been awarded many national prizes in the field of investigative journalism. In 2013, she was named one of the 10 best journalists of the year in the Republic of Moldova. In 2016, Mariana Rață won the first place in the competition of the best journalistic investigations on corruption, organized by UNDP. In 2017, Mariana Rață was selected for the European Press Prize shortlist with ‘Anabolics Mafia’ investigation. She began her journalistic career at the newspaper Jurnal de Chișinău, where she had worked for ten years. In 2009-2010 she was the host of the political talkshow “Issues of the Day” on Jurnal TV channel. From 2013 to 2016 she was deputy editor-in-chief of the newspaper Ziarul National.

Mariana Rață is also an anti-corruption expert and a justice expert. She is the author of several studies on Selective Justice in the Republic of Moldova, conducted in collaboration with Freedom House.

== Awards ==
- "The best journalistic investigation", The award of the Association of Independent Press.
- The third prize of the contest “Covering Corruption in Print Media” organized by Transparency International Moldova
- "10 Journalists of the Year" edition of 2013 organized by the Independent Journalism Center
- Second place in the contest "Journalists against corruption" Transparency International, Edition 2014
- First place contest „Best journalistic corruption investigations”, organized by UNDP. December 2016
- Second place contest „Best journalistic corruption investigations”, organized by UNDP. December 2017
- Shortlist of 2017 European Press Prize at „Investigation Award”
- "Omul anului 2019" Vip Magazin magazine
