= Valentina Butnaru =

Moldovan activist and journalist

- Born: 3 September 1958 (age 67); Vorniceni, Moldavian SSR, Soviet Union
- Education: Moldova State University
- Occupation: Journalist
- Employer: Jurnal Trust Media
- Known for: President of the Association "Limba noastră cea română"
- Spouse: Val Butnaru
- Children: 3
- Parent(s): Piui Vasile and Claudia
- Relatives: Vasile Costin (grandfather)
- Awards: National Order of Merit (Romania)

Valentina Butnaru (born 3 September 1958) is a journalist and activist from the Republic of Moldova. She is the president of the Association "Limba noastră cea română" in Chișinău.

== Biography ==
Butnaru was born to Vasile and Claudia Piui on 3 September 1958, in Vorniceni, Strășeni. She graduated from Moldova State University in 1980. Valentina Butnaru is the president of the Association "Limba noastră cea română", Chișinău. The association was founded on 17 March 1990 and has over 50 branches.

== Awards ==
- National Order "For Merit" (Romanian: Ordinul naţional "Pentru Merit"), 2000.
- Medal Mihai Eminescu, 1996.
- Diplome de membru de onoare al Asociațiunii ASTRA (Despărțămintele Săcele-Brașov, Năsăud, Orăștie, Iași, 1998–2005).

== Bibliography ==
- Pohilă Vlad, Val Butnaru – Calendar Național, National Library of Moldova, 2005
- Cheianu Constantin, Despre teatrul lui Val Butnaru – Butnaru, Val. "Apusul de soare se amână", Chișinău, Cartier, 2003
- Proca Pavel, Mâine, sau poate poimâine se amână; Portrete cu jobenu-n sus, Chișinău, 2004
