= Leova =

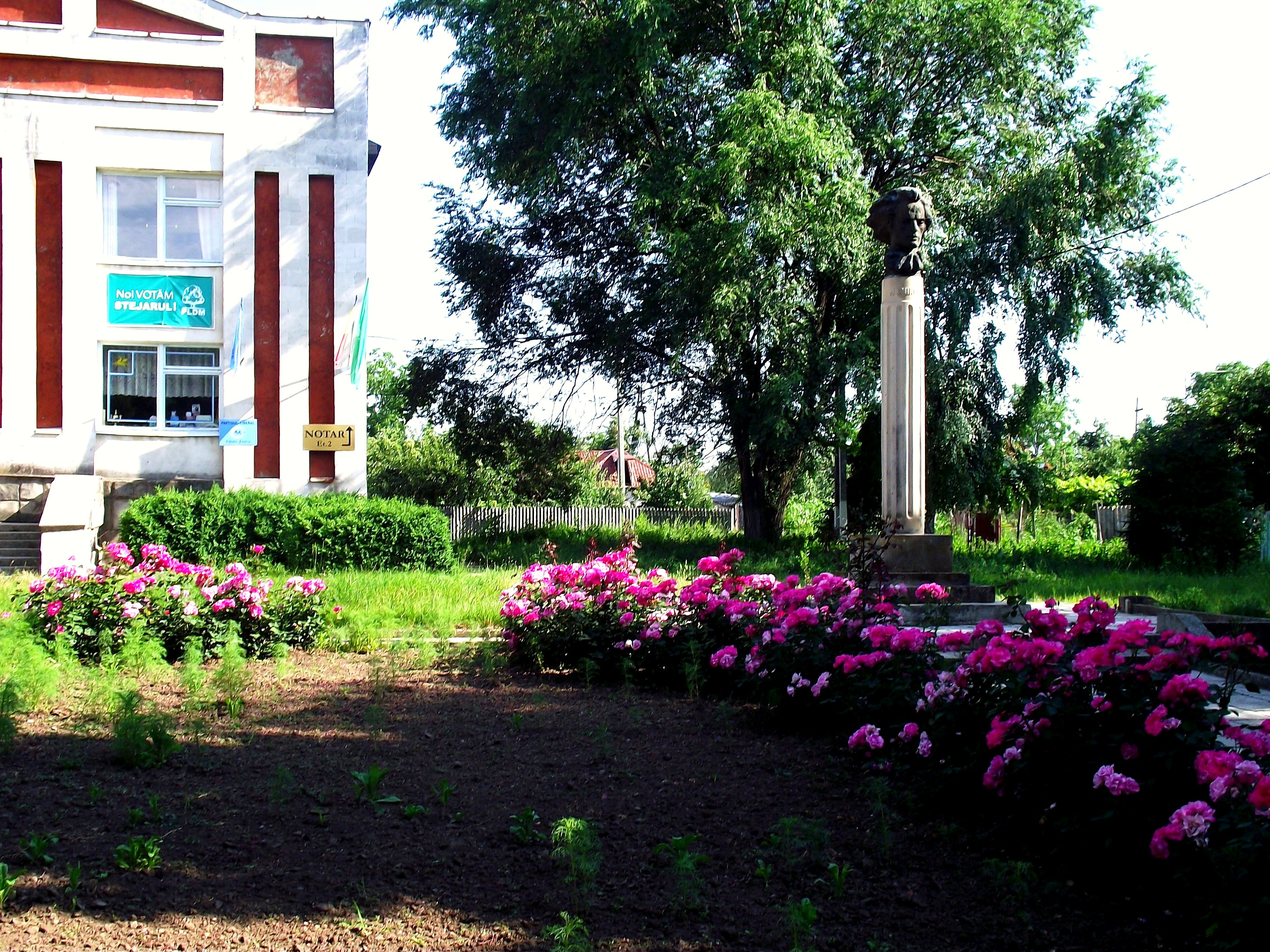

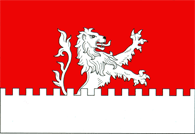
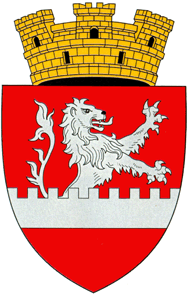
- Flag Seal

- Location within Moldova
- Coordinates: 46°29′N 28°15′E
- Country: Moldova
- District: Leova
- First attested: 13 March 1489
- Founded: 1495

Government
  - Mayor: Alexandru Bujorean (LOC), since 4 November 2019
- Elevation: 45 m (148 ft)

Population (2014)
  - Total: 7,443
- Time zone: UTC+2 (EET)
  - Summer (DST): UTC+3 (EEST)
- Postal code: MD-6301
- Area code: +373 263
- Climate: Cfb
- Website: http://primarialeova.md/

Leova is a city in Moldova, located 92 km southwest of the national capital, Chișinău. It is the administrative center of Leova District. The city is situated on the east bank of the river Prut bordering Romania.

== History ==
The city of Leova is attested as far back as the 15th century. The Leova market is attested on August 26, 1806 in a document from Constantin Moruzzi, the Moldovan prince. After 1812, Leova became a customs post and border checkpoint. In 1819 the old church was replaced by a new one, also wooden, dedicated to Saint Paraschiva. Between 1856 and 1878, Leova reentered the borders of the Principality of Moldavia and Romania. At the 1860 census, the fair was officially the 32nd urban location of Romanian Moldavia, by population (1,845 inhabitants). On October 7, 1878, after reannexation by Russia, Leova had 350 households, 5,682 desyatinas of arable land, 60 large orchards, a steam mill, and six windmills. The first school was opened in 1885, and in four years it had two classes in which 53 boys and 43 girls were taught. In 1904 the city had a town hall, police headquarters, a post office, a telegraph, a mixed school, a Jewish high school, three primary schools, an Orthodox church, and five synagogues. At the turn of the century over a thousand foreign merchants were active, and a German colony numbered 115. There were 1,073 houses and 307 monument buildings. In 1923 the city had 1,075 houses and 3,422 inhabitants, and in 1933 7,000. In the 1930s it was already a city.

In 1930 the Leova city census counted 2,326 Jewish inhabitants, about a third of the entire town population. In June 1940 the region was transferred from Romania to Soviet control as part of the secret Molotov–Ribbentrop non-aggression pact between Germany and the Soviet Union. The Soviets quickly started deporting citizens of their newly annexed territories to Siberia, including Zionist leaders and wealthy Jews. In June 1941 some Jews sensed war was coming and fled east to central Asia. Other able bodied men joined the fight against the Germans by enlisting in the Soviet Army. When the Germans occupied the city in June–July 1941, most captured Jewish men were immediately executed, while women and children were interned in Cahul Camp, a transit camp from which detainees were subject to a forced migration or "death march". The death march began in Leova in September 1941 and ending in Berezovka, Ukraine in early January 1942. Of the 525 people (389 from Leova) interned in Cahul Camp, most died of exposure and hunger along the way, or were executed when they were too weak to continue the journey or couldn't keep up. Only two young girls are known to have survived the Journey from Leova to Berezovka.

== Demographics ==
Historical population
Year	Pop.	±%
1930	6,539	—
1959	6,263	−4.2%
1970	8,929	+42.6%
1979	11,185	+25.3%
1989	12,203	+9.1%
2004	10,027	−17.8%
2014	7,443	−25.8%

According to the 2014 census, the population of Leova amounted to 7,443 inhabitants, a decrease compared to the previous census in 2004, when 10,027 inhabitants were registered. Of these, 3,724 were men and 3,719 were women.

Ethnic composition of Leova (2014)
1. Moldovans* (82.3%)
2. Romanians (6.14%)
3. Russians (4.49%)
4. Bulgarians (3.01%)
5. Ukrainians (2.54%)
6. Others (1.45%)
:Linguistic composition of Leova (2014)
1. Moldovan* (67.6%)
2. Romanian (21.4%)
3. Russian (8.09%)
4. Bulgarian (1.49%)
5. Ukrainian (0.97%)
6. Other (0.50%)

Footnotes:

* There is an ongoing controversy regarding the ethnic identification of Moldovans and Romanians.

* Moldovan language is one of the two local names for the Romanian language in Moldova. In 2013, the Constitutional Court of Moldova interpreted that Article 13 of the constitution is superseded by the Declaration of Independence, thus giving official status to the name Romanian.

== Climate ==
Climate data for Leova (1991–2020, extremes 1949–present)
Month	Jan	Feb	Mar	Apr	May	Jun	Jul	Aug	Sep	Oct	Nov	Dec	Year
Record high °C (°F)	17.1 (62.8)	21.5 (70.7)	27.2 (81.0)	30.9 (87.6)	35.8 (96.4)	37.7 (99.9)	40.4 (104.7)	39.8 (103.6)	36.1 (97.0)	33.6 (92.5)	23.3 (73.9)	18.0 (64.4)	39.8 (103.6)
Mean daily maximum °C (°F)	0.7 (33.3)	3.4 (38.1)	9.6 (49.3)	16.9 (62.4)	22.8 (73.0)	26.4 (79.5)	28.6 (83.5)	28.5 (83.3)	22.8 (73.0)	15.8 (60.4)	8.5 (47.3)	2.3 (36.1)	15.5 (59.9)
Daily mean °C (°F)	−2.3 (27.9)	−0.3 (31.5)	4.5 (40.1)	10.9 (51.6)	16.6 (61.9)	20.4 (68.7)	22.5 (72.5)	22.3 (72.1)	16.9 (62.4)	10.8 (51.4)	4.8 (40.6)	−0.6 (30.9)	10.5 (50.9)
Mean daily minimum °C (°F)	−4.7 (23.5)	−3.3 (26.1)	0.6 (33.1)	6.0 (42.8)	11.4 (52.5)	15.3 (59.5)	17.2 (63.0)	16.9 (62.4)	12.1 (53.8)	6.9 (44.4)	2.1 (35.8)	−3.0 (26.6)	6.5 (43.7)
Record low °C (°F)	−25.6 (−14.1)	−31.4 (−24.5)	−21.1 (−6.0)	−5.1 (22.8)	0.5 (32.9)	5.4 (41.7)	8.6 (47.5)	6.6 (43.9)	−3.1 (26.4)	−10.1 (13.8)	−17.3 (0.9)	−23.1 (−9.6)	−31.4 (−24.5)
Average precipitation mm (inches)	32 (1.3)	26 (1.0)	35 (1.4)	39 (1.5)	61 (2.4)	64 (2.5)	64 (2.5)	55 (2.2)	50 (2.0)	44 (1.7)	39 (1.5)	40 (1.6)	549 (21.6)
Average precipitation days (≥ 1.0 mm)	6	5	7	6	9	7	7	5	5	5	5	7	73
Average relative humidity (%)	84	82	75	66	64	66	65	64	68	74	83	87	73
Source 1: NOAA
Source 2: Serviciul Hidrometeorologic de Stat (extremes, relative humidity)

== Media ==
- Cuvântul Liber

== Notable people ==
- Idel Ianchelevici (1909–1994)
- Ion Aldea Teodorovici (1954–1992)
- Victor Toma (1922–2008)
- Irina Rîngaci (born 2001), freestyle wrestler, 2021 World Champion

== Attractions ==
Bust of Grigore Vieru (by Veaceslav Jiglitchi)

== International relations ==
=== Twin towns — Sister cities ===
Leova is twinned with:

- Vetrișoaia, Romania
