= Moldavskie Vedomosti =

- Editor-in-chief: Dumitru Ciubașenco
- Founded: 1995
- Language: Russian
- Headquarters: Chișinău
- Website: evedomosti.md

Moldavskie Vedomosti (English: Moldovan News) is a newspaper from Chișinău, the Republic of Moldova, founded by Dumitru Ciubașenco in 1995. During the presidency of Vladimir Voronin, it was considered the main opposition newspaper of the country.

== See also ==
- List of newspapers in Moldova
