= Idel Ianchelevici =

Romanian-Belgian sculptor (1909–1994)

Idel Ianchelevici (5 May 1909 – 28 June 1994) was a Romanian and Belgian sculptor and draughtsman born in present day Moldova.

== Life ==
Born to Jewish parents in Leova, Izmailsky Uyezd, Bessarabia Governorate, Russian Empire, he left Romania for Belgium in 1928 to devote himself entirely to his passion for sculpture and drawing. After completing his military service back home, he returned to Liège and registered at the Académie des Beaux-Arts de la Ville, where he was awarded first prize for statuary art in 1933.

The same year, he married Elisabeth Frenay and moved to Brussels. He took part in the design of the Romanian pavilion for the Exposition internationale universelle in Brussels in 1935 and went on to hold a variety of exhibitions of his own in Brussels, Tel-Aviv, Paris, Amsterdam and several other cities.

1945 was the watershed year: Ianchelevici obtained Belgian nationality, and his famous statue l'Appel ("The Call") was officially unveiled in La Louvière. 10 years later, Ianchelevici was awarded a grant to work in the Belgian Congo, where he designed three statues intended to supplement the famous Stanley-monument in Léopoldville (now Kinshasa) and produced a number of outstanding drawings. He subsequently exhibited his work in countries throughout the world. In 1950, he settled in France, at Maisons-Laffitte, where he remained until his death on at the age of 86. A cultural centre in the town now bears his name.

== Art ==
"The exaltation of mankind at the height of its powers" is the inspiration for Ianchelevici's work, which explains the ease of monumental compositions such as "l'Appel" (1939). His figures are expressive and powerful, witness Conspiration ("Conspiracy", 1932), a piece inspired by the working class struggles of the time, and the Monument national au prisonnier politique ("National Monument to the Political Prisoner") erected in Breendonk in 1954.

The works of Ianchelevici literally step out of the medium. There is no void, no gap: the composition is entirely dictated by the mass and form of its volume (Paternel). From 1945 onwards, Ianchelevici began sculpting marble and stone – two notoriously difficult materials which require simplification of form. Limbs grew longer and more supple and the themes moved on, taking inspiration from the unformed, girlish figures of his young subjects. The artist's career underwent a major change at this point, as he embarked upon a ceaseless quest for simpler forms and more schematic faces (Eve, 1980). Alongside his sculpting, Ianchelevici never stopped drawing.

His drawings are works of art in their own right, and not always sketches for his sculptures. In both disciplines, however, he draws on the same themes and strives for the same simplicity of form.

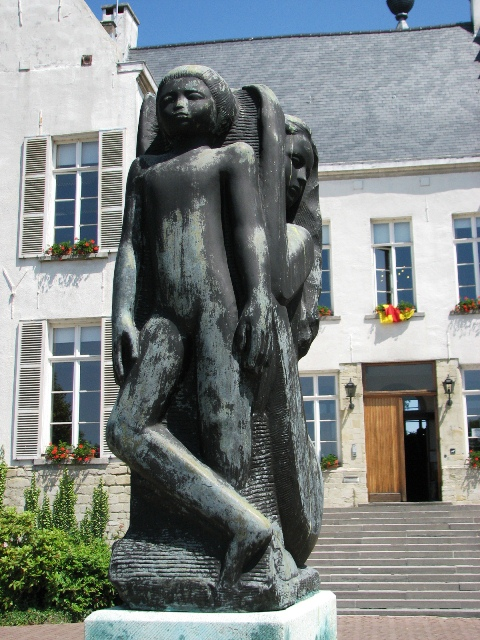
Wemmel

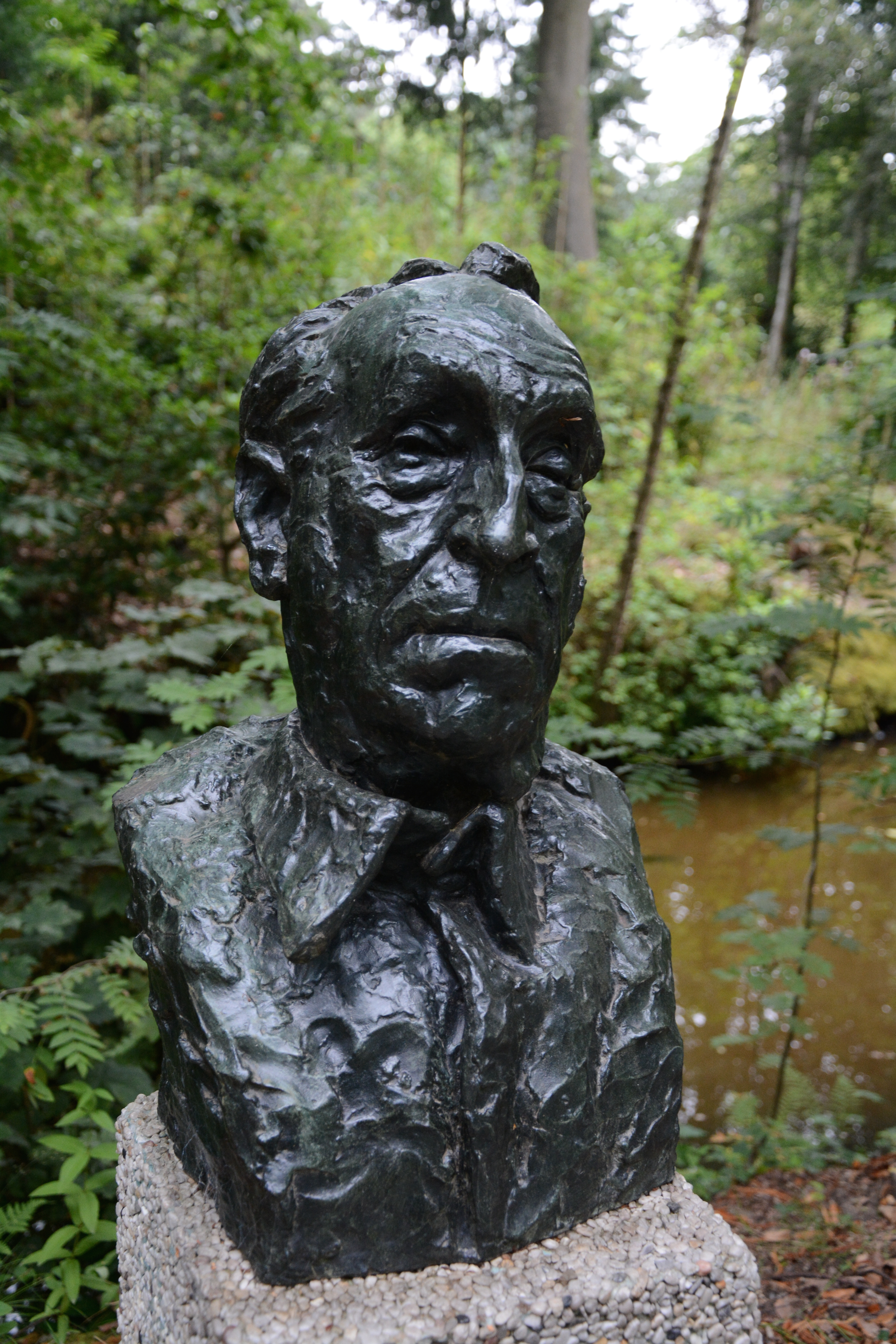
August Vermeylen

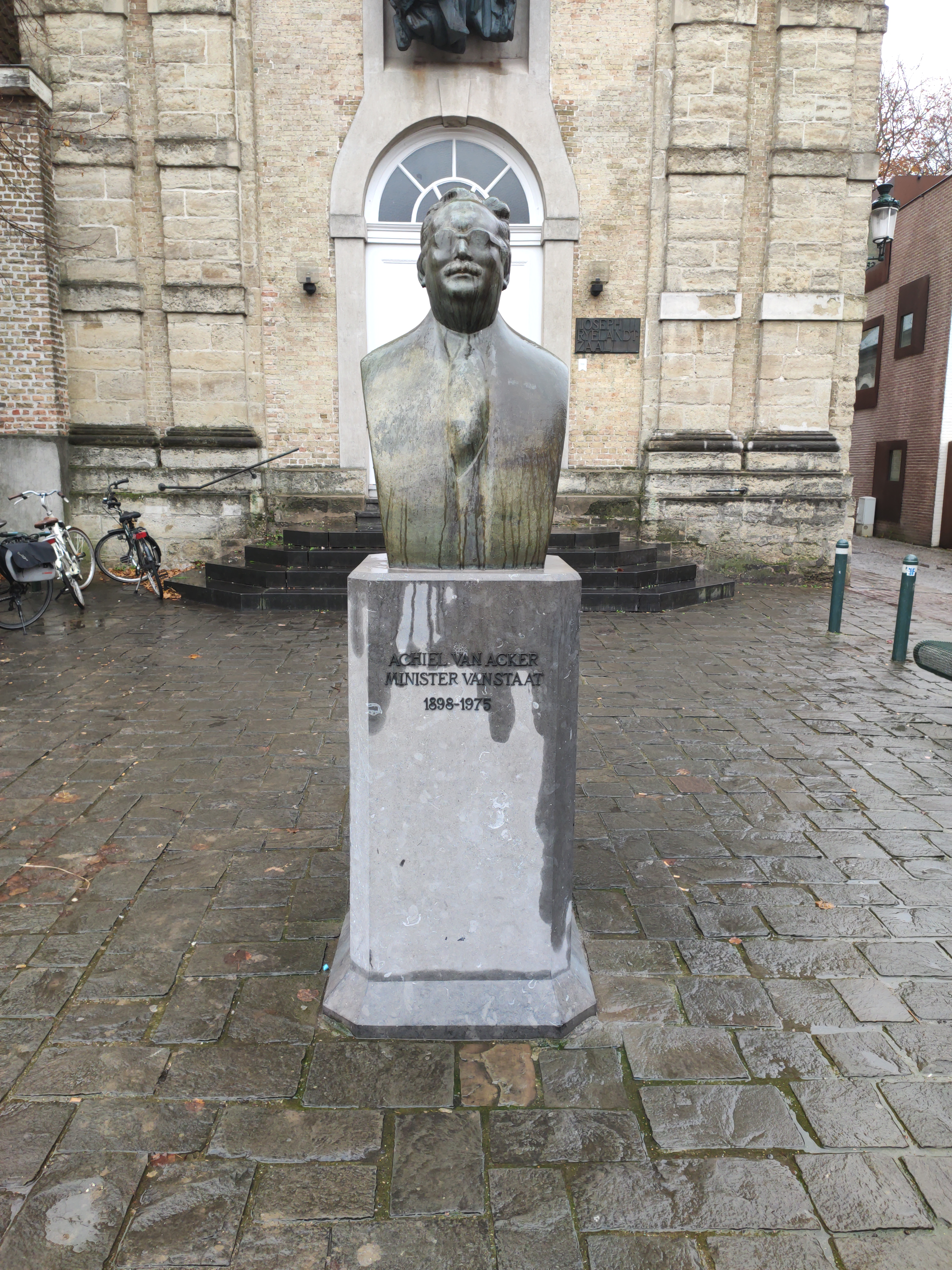
Achiel Van Acker

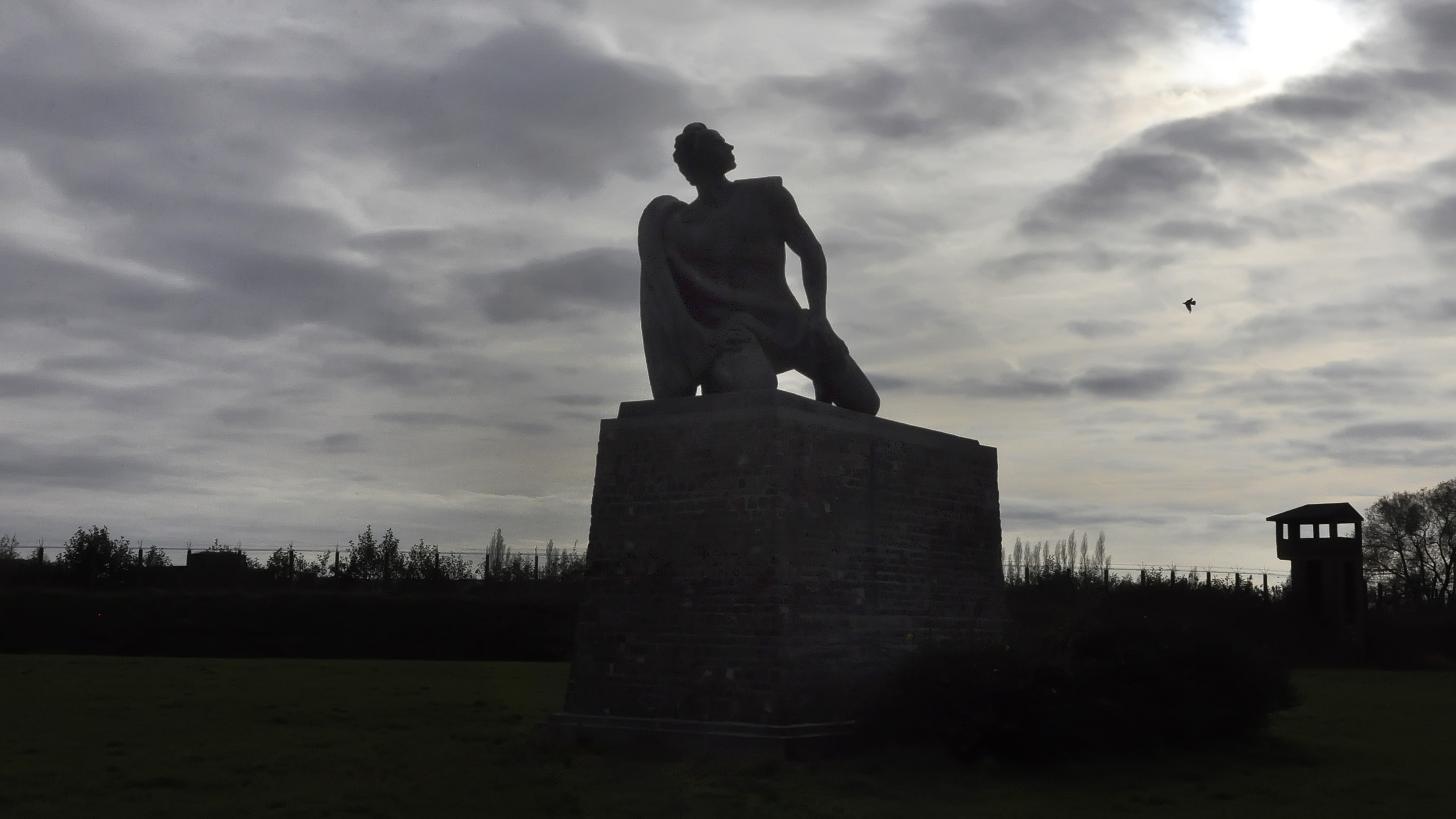
Breendonk

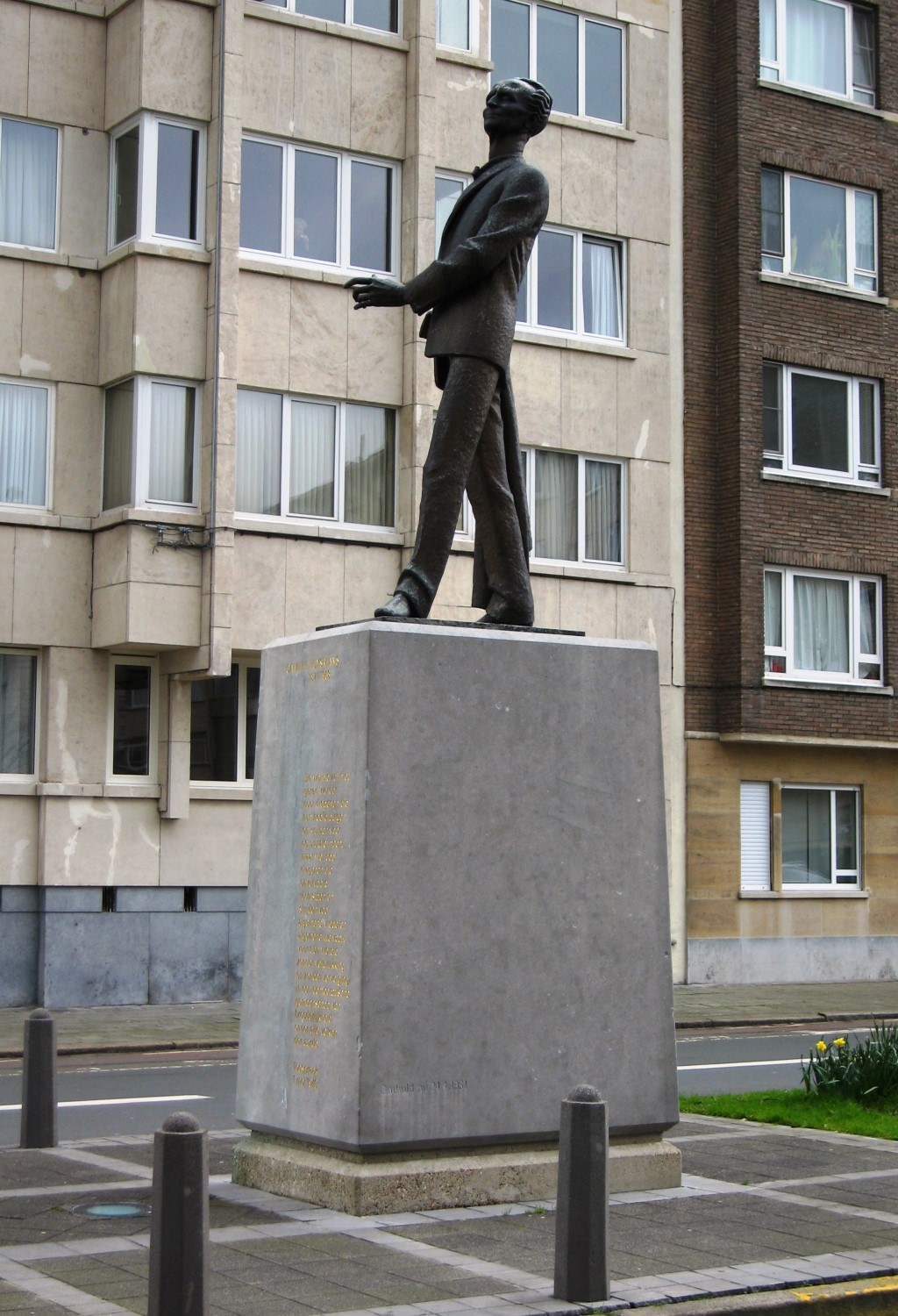
Antwerpen

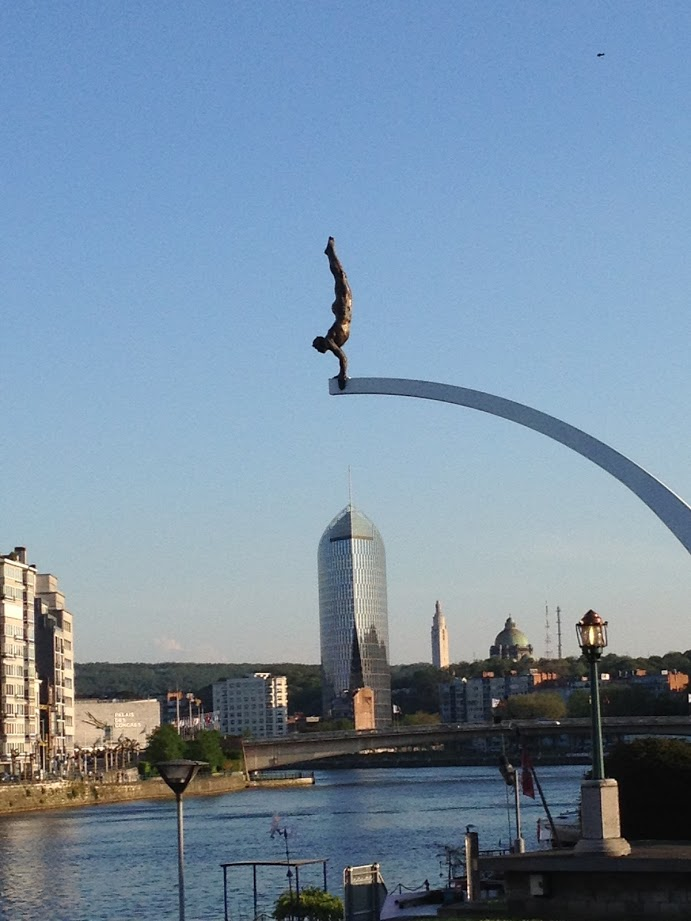
Liège
