= Cuvântul Liber (Leova) =

Moldovan newspaper

- Owner: Ion Mititelu
- Editor-in-chief: Ion Mititelu
- Founded: 1998
- Language: Romanian
- Headquarters: Leova
- Circulation: 5,500
- Website: cuvantulliber.md

Cuvântul Liber (English: The Free Word) is a newspaper from Leova, the Republic of Moldova, founded by Ion Mititelu in 1998.

== See also ==
- List of newspapers in Moldova
