= Ungheni =

Municipality in Ungheni District, Moldova

- Municipality
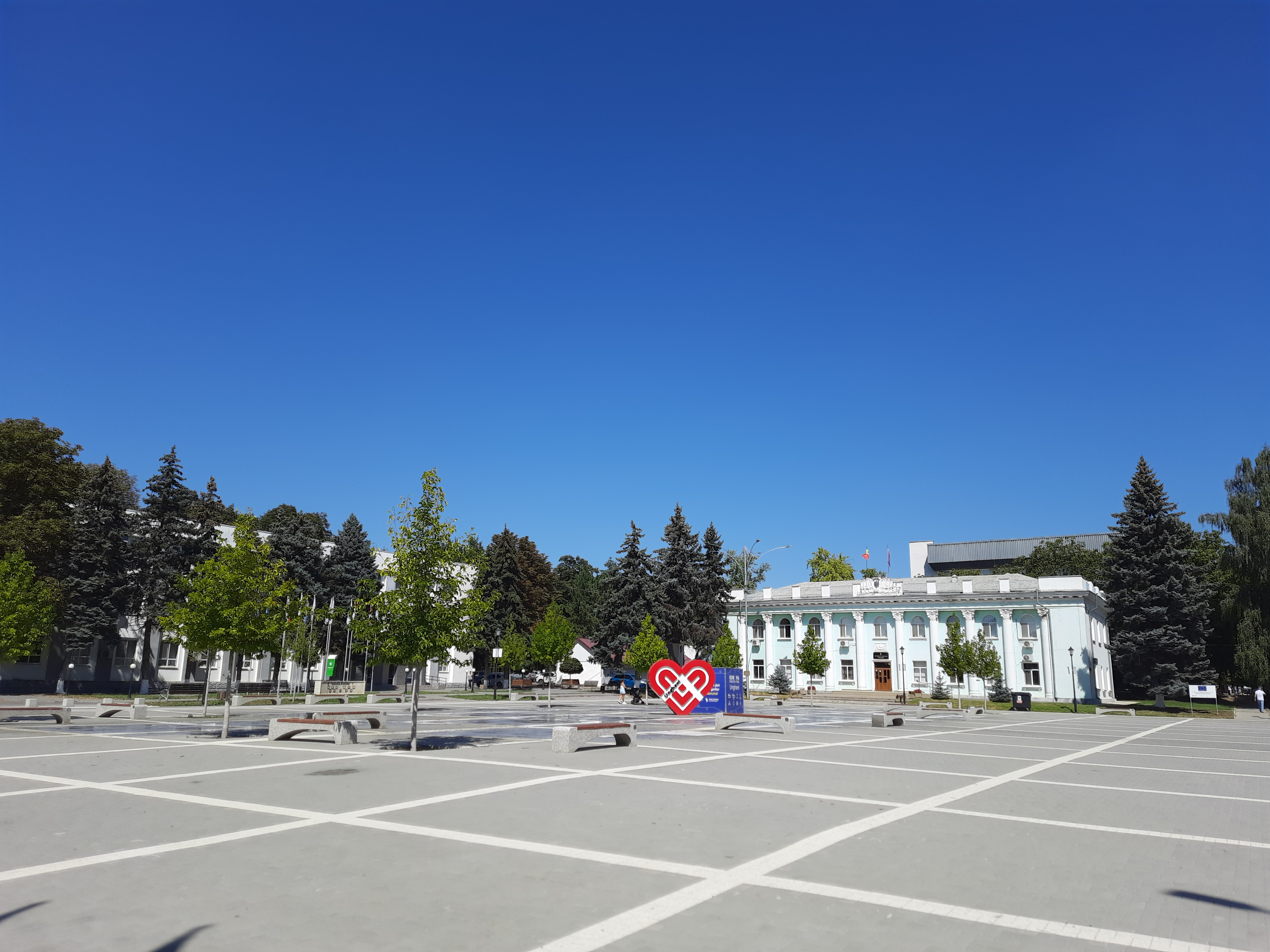
- Piața Independenței (Independence Square)

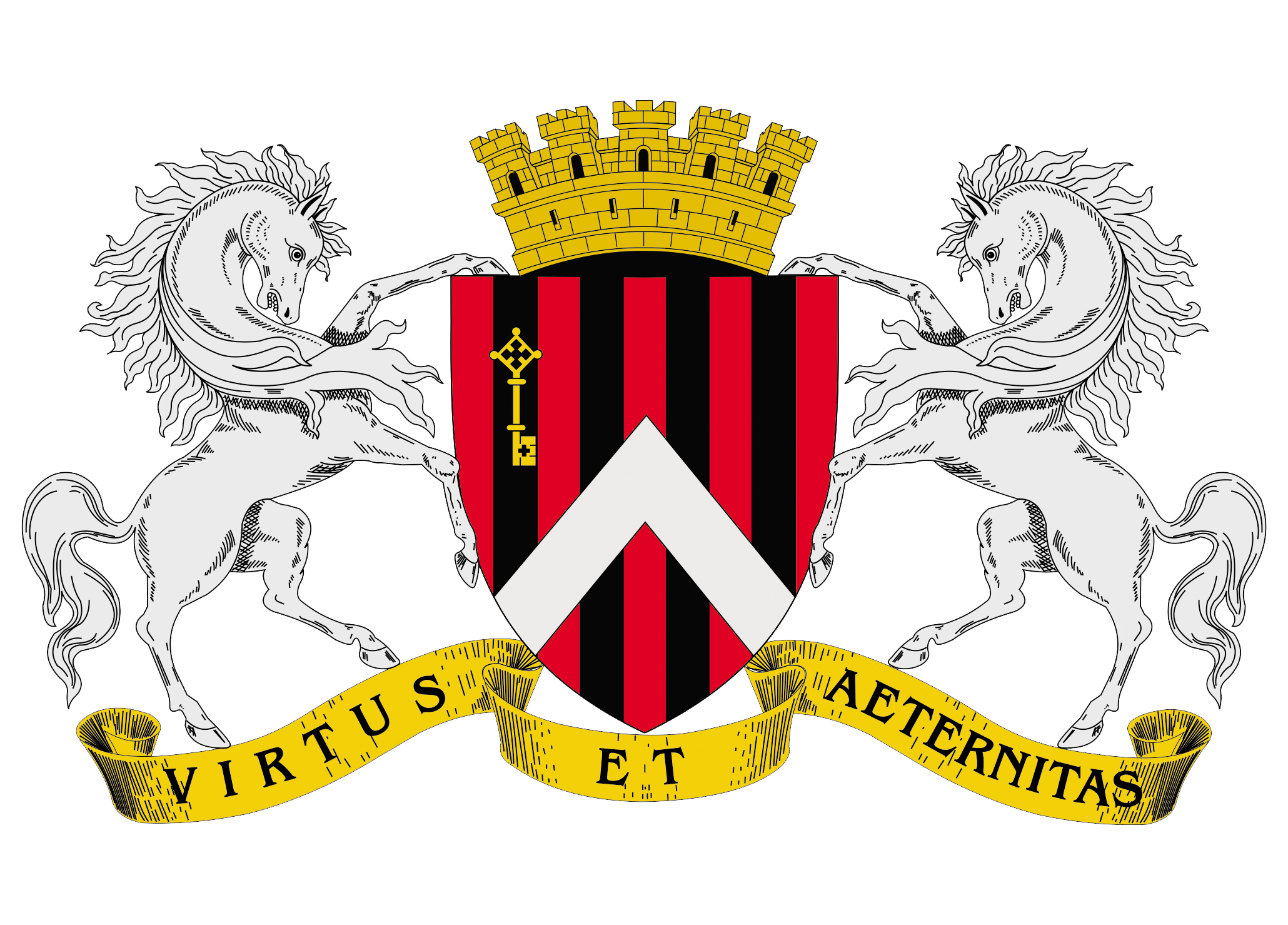
- Flag Coat of arms

- Location within Moldova
- Coordinates: 47°13′N 27°49′E
- Country: Moldova
- County: Ungheni District
- First mentioned: 1462

Government
  - Mayor: Vitalie Vrabie

Area
  - Total: 16.4 km^{2} (6.3 sq mi)

Population (2014)
  - Total: 30,804
  - Density: 1,880/km^{2} (4,860/sq mi)
- Time zone: UTC+2 (EET)
  - Summer (DST): UTC+3 (EEST)
- Website: Official website

Ungheni (Romanian pronunciation: [uŋˈɡenʲ]) is a city, municipality and the seat of Ungheni District in the Republic of Moldova.

There is a bridge across the Prut River and a border checkpoint to Romania. The town of Ungheni in the Republic of Moldova lays across the Prut from the village of Ungheni in Romania, the two being historically part of the same town.

== History ==
The first historical mention of Ungheni dates to 20 August 1462. A railway between Ungheni and Chișinău was built in 1875 by Russia in preparation for the Russo-Turkish War of 1877–1878. In the interwar period, the town formed part of Romania. During World War II, it was occupied by the Soviet Union from 1940, then recaptured by Romania in 1941, and then re-occupied by the Soviet Union in 1944, within which it formed part of the Moldavian SSR. After the war, the rail route through Ungheni became the main connection between the USSR and Romania.

== Features and attractions ==
=== Gustave Eiffel bridge ===
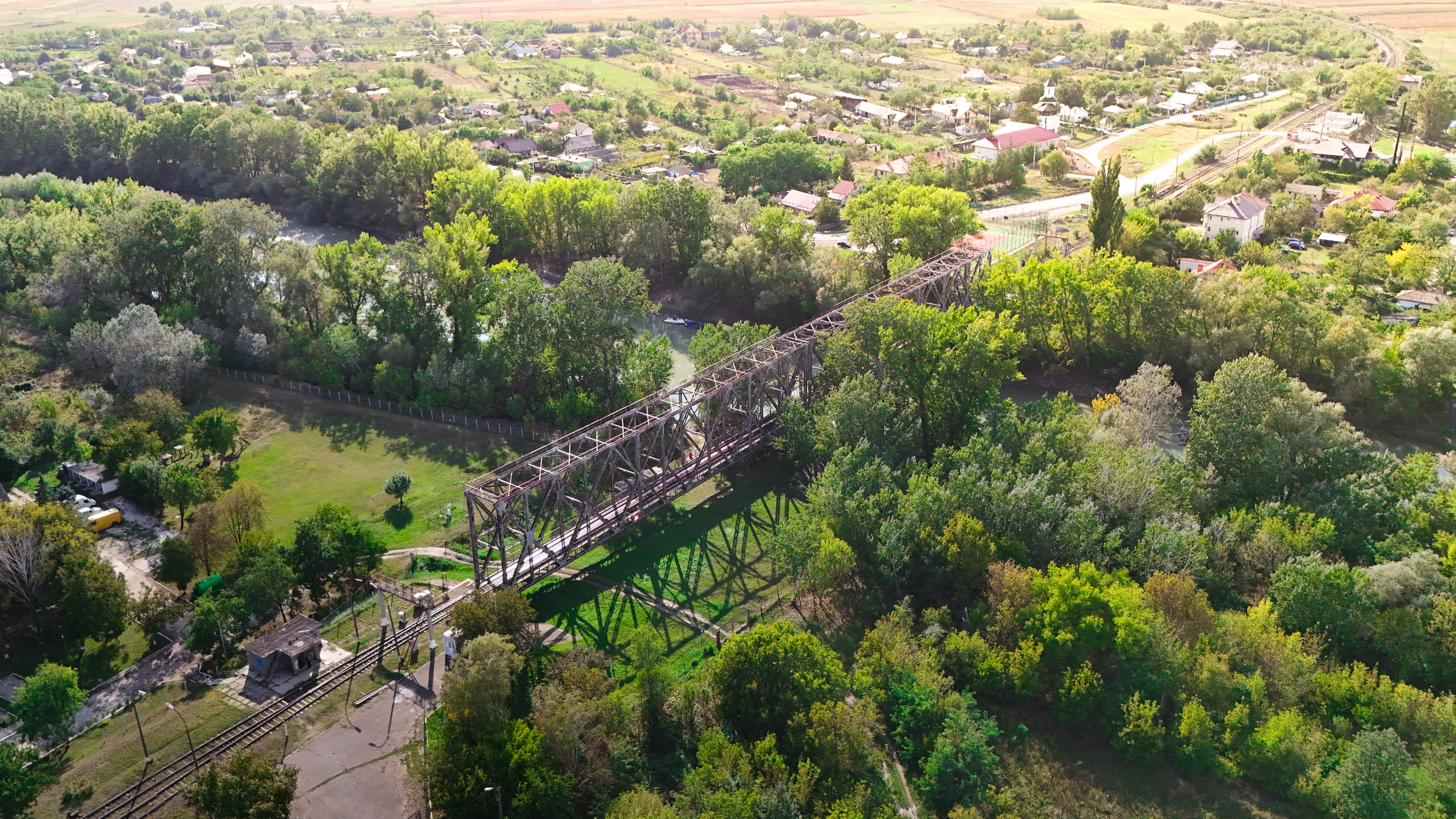
Eiffel Bridge

In 1876, after the spring flooding of the river Prut, the railway bridge that linked Moldova and Romania was almost destroyed. The Railways Department invited Gustave Eiffel to Bessarabia (Moldova) to redesign and rebuild the bridge. Today, it remains a strategic structure under the supervision of border guards.

The EU proposed in 2023 to lay a new rail 1435mm standard gauge line from Ungheni to Chisinau, alongside the existing 1520mm track, to avoid disruption to existing services.

== Transport ==
Ungheni has a well-developed network of roads of both national and local importance, and serves as a key railway hub and customs border crossing that connects the domestic network with international routes.

=== Rail ===
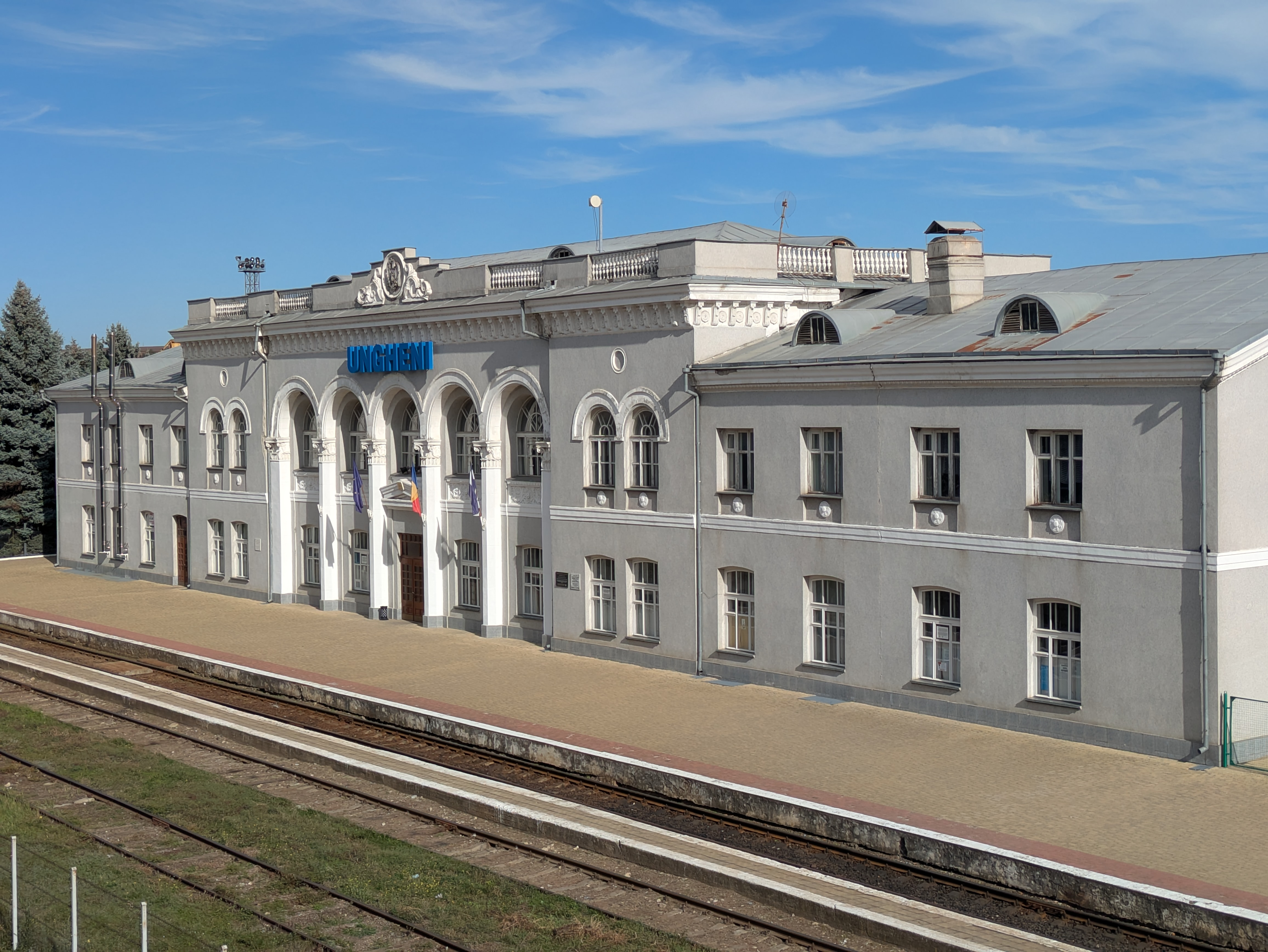
Ungheni Railway station

Ungheni railway station is an international crossing point, handling both freight and passenger transport. It is the largest railway junction in central Moldova, with limited services to Chișinău and international services to Kyiv.

=== Road ===
The construction of the Ungheni–Iași–Târgu Mureș motorway is planned, linking it to the Transylvania Motorway.

=== River Port ===
The municipality also has a river port on the Prut, managed by the State Enterprise “Ungheni River Port”. Ungheni River Port is one of the four river ports currently operating in the Republic of Moldova. In recent years, development works on the River Prut have continued. Recently, maintenance of the Ungheni technical sector has included dredging and straightening works along a 385–405 km stretch of the riverbed.

== Demographics ==
According to the 2024 census, 26,457 inhabitants lived in Ungheni (making it the sixth largest city in Moldova), a decrease compared to the previous census in 2014, when 30,804 inhabitants were registered.

Ethnic composition of Ungheni (2024)
1. Moldovans (Note: There is an ongoing controversy regarding the ethnic identification of Moldovans and Romanians.) (87.3%)
2. Romanians (7.80%)
3. Ukrainians (2.80%)
4. Russians (1.50%)
5. Others (0.50%)
Linguistic composition of Ungheni (2024)
1. Moldovan (Note: In March 2023, the Parliament of Moldova passed a law updating all legislative texts and the constitution to refer to the national language as Romanian, effectively rendering the term "Moldovan" obsolete.) (47.8%)
2. Romanian (43.9%)
3. Russian (6.70%)
4. Ukrainian (1.40%)
5. Other (0.20%)

Historical population
Year	Pop.	±%
1959	11,129	—
1970	17,228	+54.8%
1979	25,792	+49.7%
1989	37,788	+46.5%
2004	32,530	−13.9%
2014	30,804	−5.3%
2024	26,457	−14.1%

== Media ==
- Unghiul
- Expresul de Ungheni
- Euronova TV
- UNGHENI.TV
- Radio Chişinău 93.8 FM
- Vocea Basarabiei 100.1 FM

== Natives ==
- Anatolie Arhire
- Constantin Bejenaru
- Alexandr Braico
- Eugen Carpov
- I. A. L. Diamond
- Natalia Munteanu
- Vanotek - Moldovan-Romanian record producer and disc jockey
- Shmuel Cohen - Jewish poet, wrote the Music of Hatikvah, the national anthem of Israel

== International relations ==
=== Twin towns – Sister cities ===
Ungheni is twinned with:

- Auce, Latvia
- Dmitrovsk, Russia
- Konin, Poland
- Reghin, Romania
- Vasylkiv, Ukraine
- Winston-Salem, United States
- Mankato, United States
- Cascais, Portugal

== Consulates ==
- Romania – Consulate

== Gallery ==
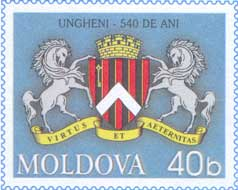
The first historical mention of Ungheni dates to 20 August 1462

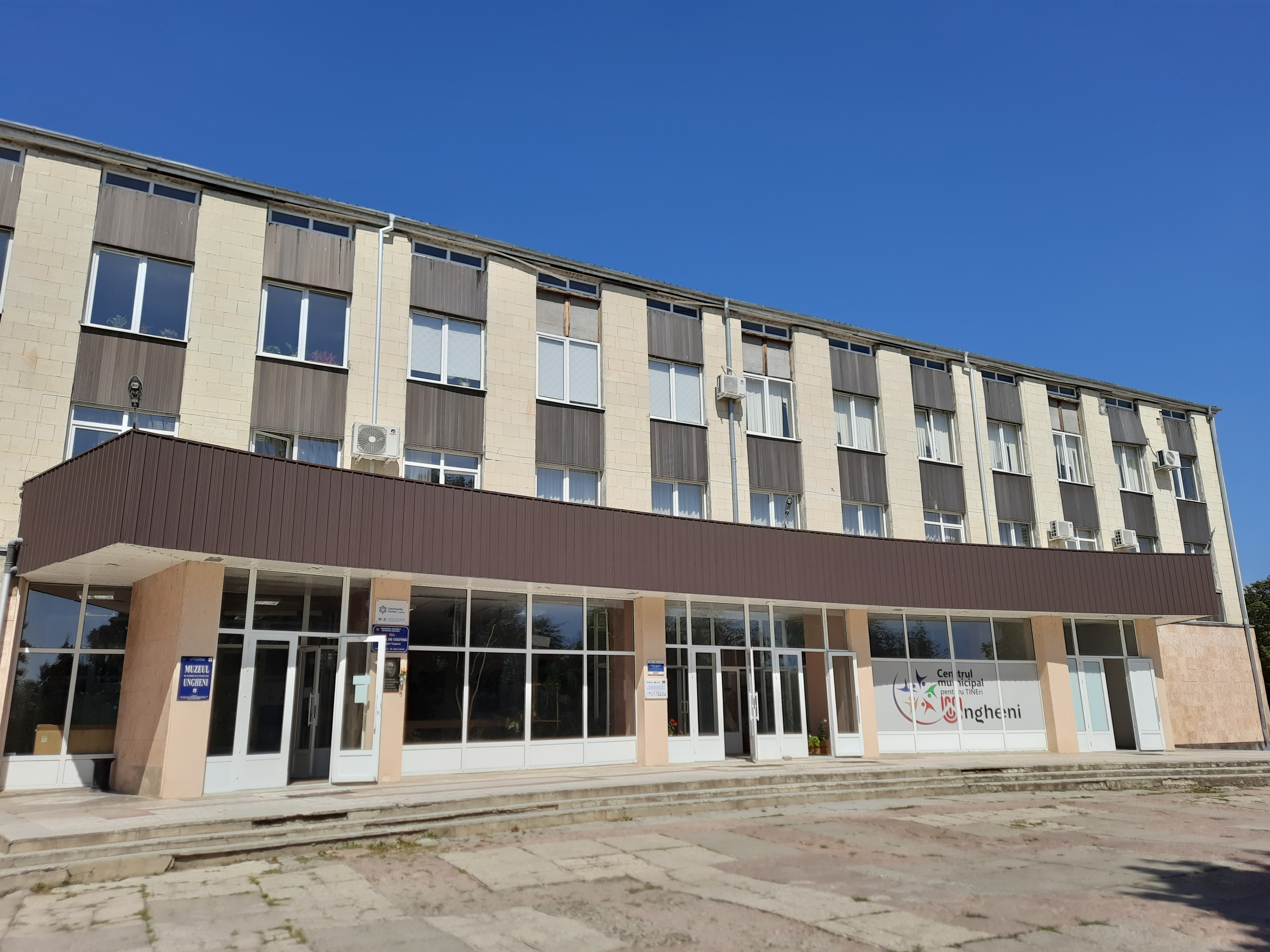
Museum

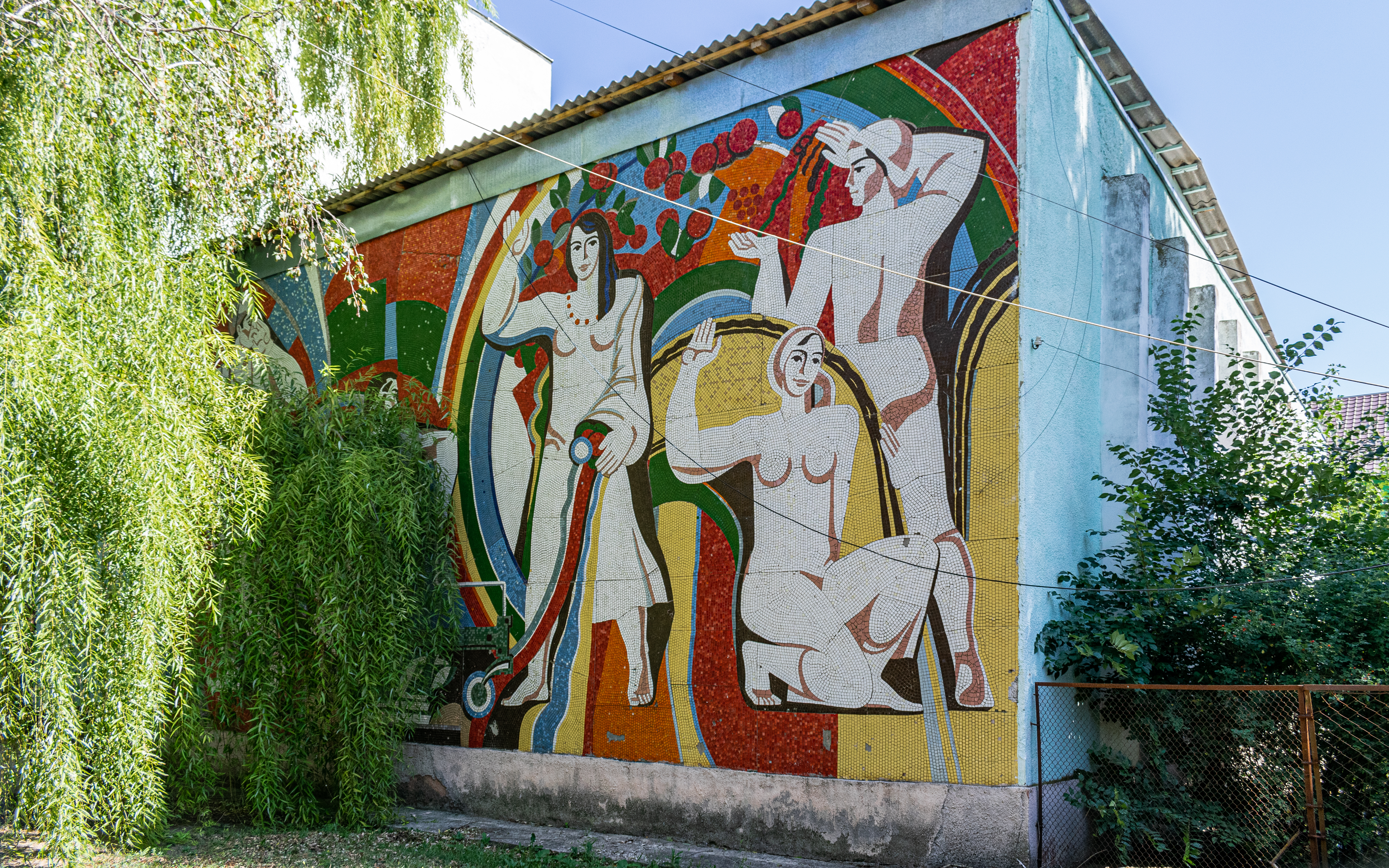
Socialist mosaics

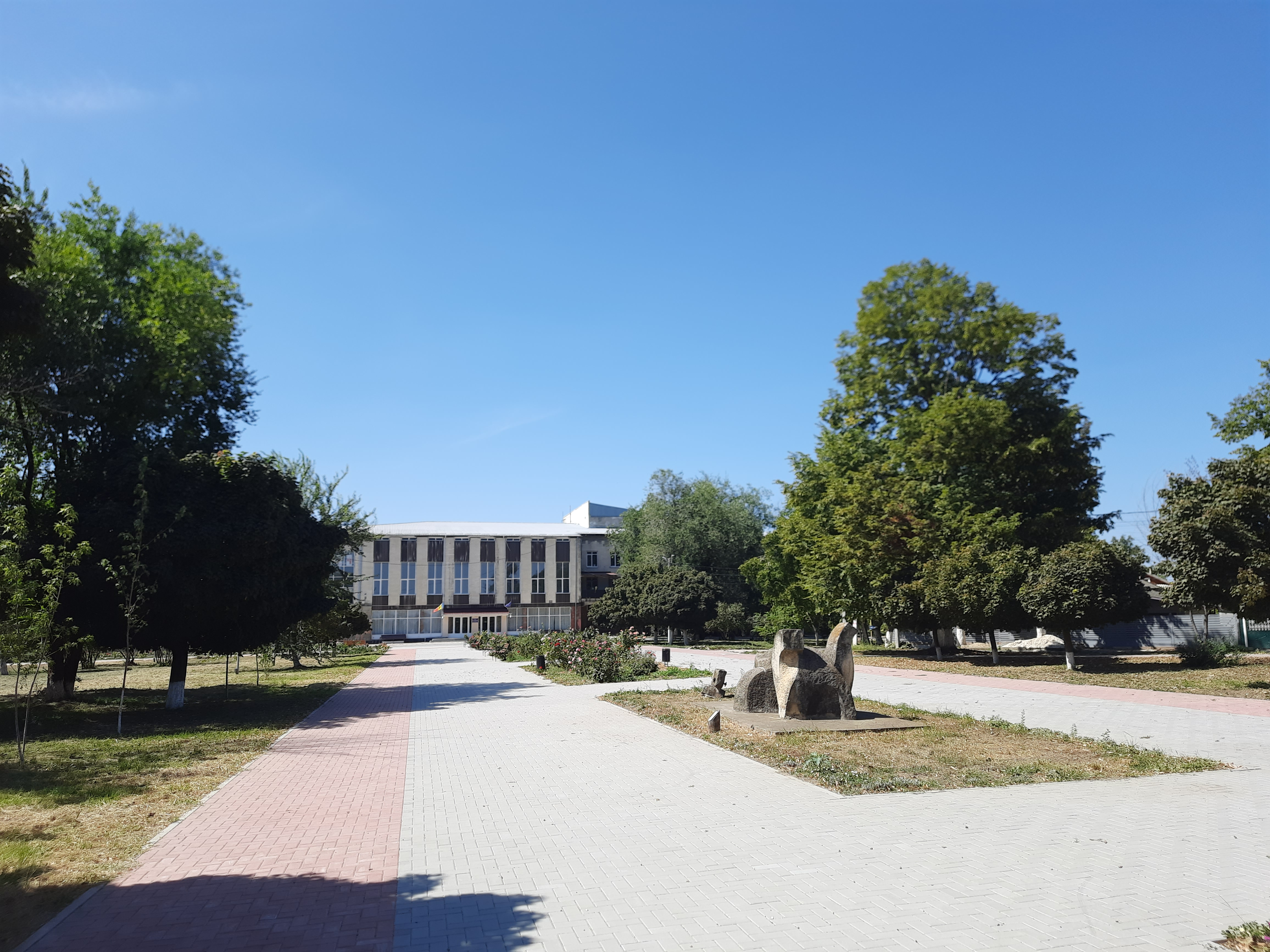
Palace of Culture

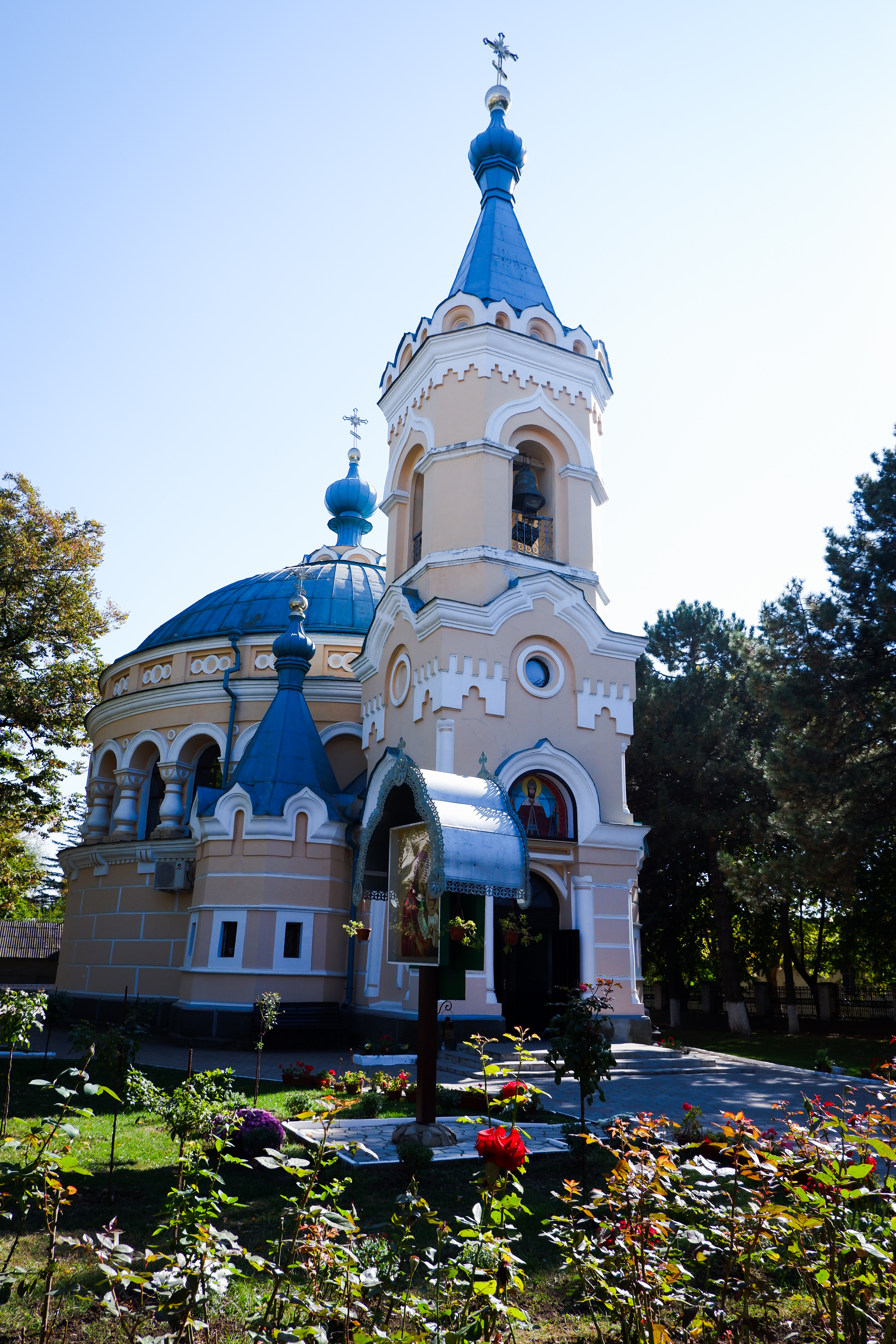
Saint Alexander church

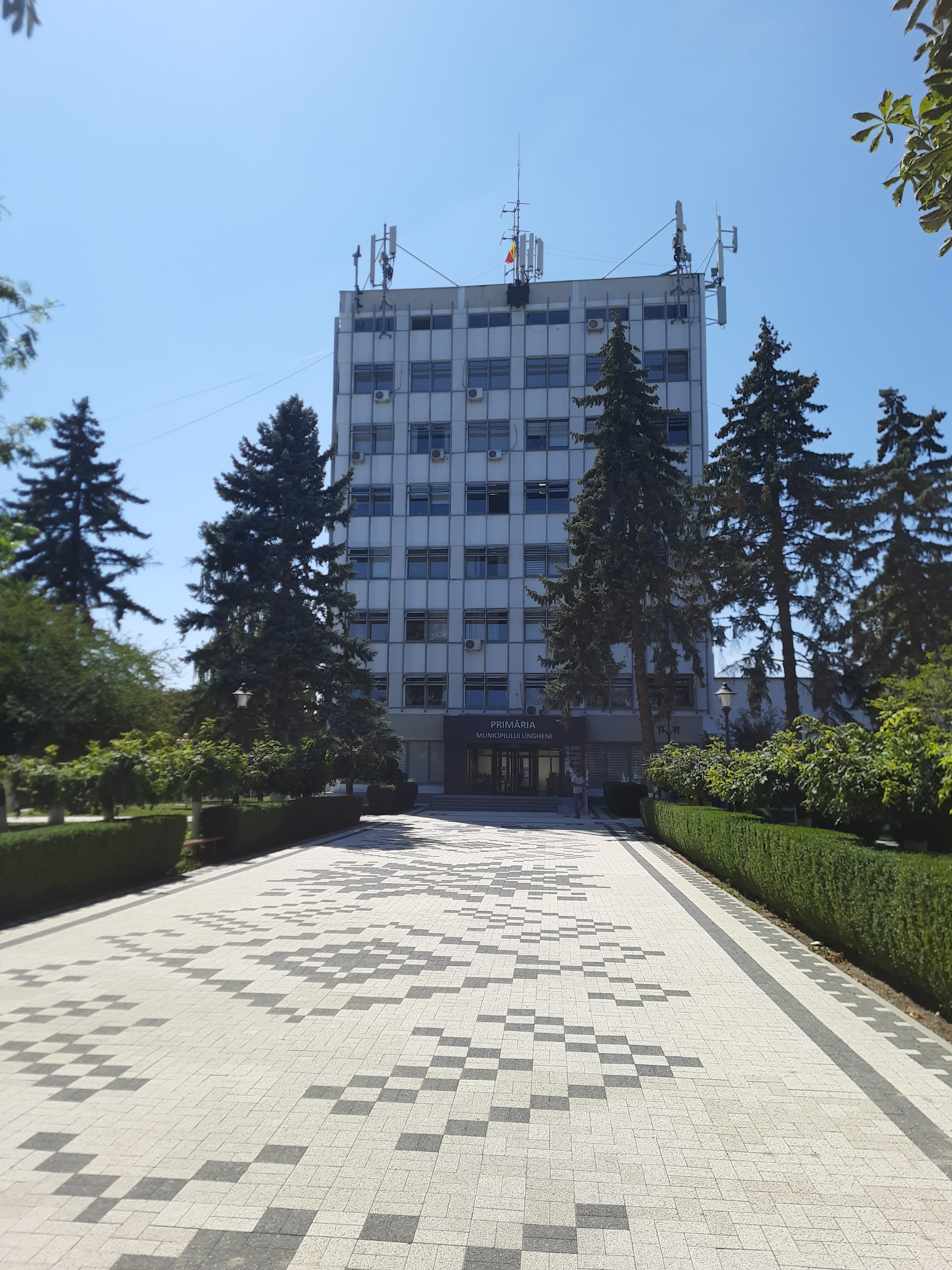
Town Hall
