= Prime (Moldovan TV channel) =

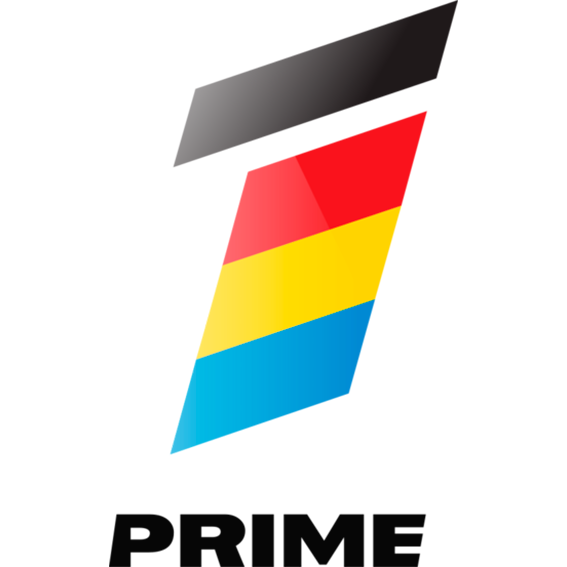
- Country: Moldova
- Broadcast area: Moldova
- Headquarters: Chișinău, Moldova

Programming
- Language: Romanian
- Picture format: 576i (16:9 SDTV)

Ownership
- Owner: I.C.S. "General Media Group" S.R.L.
- Sister channels: Canal 2, Canal 3, Publika TV

History
- Launched: September 1999; 26 years ago
- Replaced: ORT (within territory)
- Closed: 30 October 2023; 2 years ago (broadcast license suspended)
- Former names: ORT Moldova; Pervîi Kanal Moldova

Links
- Website: www.prime.md

Availability

Terrestrial
- Radiocom (DVB-T2): -

Prime was a former Moldovan generalist television channel. The channel was distributed via DVB-T2 and by pay TV operators in Moldova. Until November 2019, it also retransmitted programs from Channel One Russia; the channel handed back its analog broadcasting license soon after.

The owner of the channel was convicted oligarch Vladimir Plahotniuc. For much of its history, it was one of Moldova's most popular channels.

The channel was criticized and on 4 July 2014, the Coordinating Council of the Audiovisual of Moldova sanctioned Prime and other channels for broadcasting Russian "informative-analytical" programs, which contained aggressive propaganda and promotes and increases fake news and information regarding the Ukrainian government.

Its broadcasting license, along with 5 other channels, were revoked on October 30, 2023. The channel left the air later that same day.

== Original shows/programs ==
Year(s)	Title
2011-2012	Vrei să fii milionar?
2010–2018	DA sau NU
2013, 2017-2023	100 de moldoveni au zis
13 November 2017-2023	Vorbește Moldova
2010–present	De Facto
2011–2019	Replica (with Mihaela Gherasim (2010-2012), Valeriu Frumusachi (2013-2017), with Alexei Lungu (2017-2019))
2016–2020	Cronica lui Bogatu
2019–2023	Roata Norocului
2015–2023	Prima ora
2008–2023	Primele Stiri
