= Bursuceni =

- Commune
- Location in Moldova
- Coordinates: 47°29′N 28°01′E
- Country: Moldova
- District: Sîngerei District

Population (2014)
  - Total: 1,243
- Time zone: UTC+2 (EET)
  - Summer (DST): UTC+3 (EEST)

Bursuceni is a commune in Sîngerei District, Moldova. It is composed of two villages, Bursuceni and Slobozia-Măgura.

== Notable people ==
- Leonida Lari
