= Cuvântul (Moldovan newspaper) =

- Owner(s): Tudor Iaşcenco, Elena Roman, Liuba Zamă, Victor Sofroni (90%), SA "Tipografia Rezina"
- Editor-in-chief: Tudor Iaşcenco
- Staff writers: Liuba Zamă, Elena Roman, Victor Sofroni, Ion Cernei, Aliona Golub
- Founded: 1995
- Language: Romanian
- Headquarters: Rezina
- Website: cuvintul.md

Cuvântul (English: The Word) was a newspaper published in Rezina, the Republic of Moldova, founded in 1995 by Tudor Iaşcenco.

== See also ==
- List of newspapers in Moldova
