= Dnestrovskaya Pravda =

Russian-language newspaper

Dnestrovskaya Pravda is a Russian-language newspaper from Tiraspol, the capital of Transnistria. It was founded by the Tiraspol City Council of popular deputies in 1941. This is the oldest periodical publication in the region. Its name means Dniester Truth; taking its title from the Dniester river, which flows through the city.

Its editor is Tatyana Mikhailovna Rudenko (Cyrillic: Татьяна Михайловна Руденко).
