= Jurnal de Chișinău =

Moldovan newspaper

- Type: Daily newspaper
- Owner: Jurnal Trust Media
- Founder: Val Butnaru
- Editor-in-chief: Rodica Mahu
- Editor: Val Butnaru
- Language: Romanian
- Headquarters: Chișinău
- Website: Official website

Jurnal de Chișinău was a Moldovan newspaper, founded in 1999. It went defunct on its printed version at the end of 2019, still being available online.

== Overview ==
Its head was Val Butnaru, the Jurnal Trust Media president. The Trust comprises also Jurnal TV, newspapers ECOnomist, Apropo Magazin and radio station Jurnal FM. Its headquarters were in Chișinău. Nicolae Negru and Petru Bogatu were the most known editorialists of Jurnal de Chișinău.

== Notable people ==
- Petru Bogatu
- Nicolae Negru
- Mariana Rață
- Val Butnaru
- Elena Robu-Popa
- Rodica Mahu
