= Țara =

Newspaper from Moldova

- Publisher: Popular Front of Moldova
- Editor-in-chief: Ștefan Secăreanu
- Associate editor: Sergiu Burcă (deputy editor in chief)
- Founded: August 15, 1990
- Ceased publication: 2003
- Political alignment: Popular Front of Moldova
- Language: Romanian
- Headquarters: Chișinău, Moldova
- Sister newspapers: Deșteptarea

Țara (English: The Country) was a magazine from the Republic of Moldova founded on August 15, 1990 as a newspaper of the Popular Front of Moldova. Ţara was the successor of Deșteptarea. Ștefan Secăreanu was the editor in chief and Sergiu Burcă was the deputy editor in chief (1990–1994).

== Sources ==
- Partidul Popular Creștin Democrat. Documente și materiale. 1998–2008. Volume I (1988–1994).
