= Expresul de Ungheni =

Expresul
- Format: newspaper
- Owner: Natalia Junghietu
- Founder: Lucia Bacalu
- Publisher: Natalia Junghietu
- Editor-in-chief: Natalia Junghietu
- Editor: Tatiana Tesliuc
- Associate editor: Gabriela Boxan
- News editor: Natalia Junghietu, Tatiana Tesliuc
- Staff writers: Natalia Junghietu, Tatiana Tesliuc, Gabriela Boxan, Angela Covaliov
- Founded: 1 November 2007
- Language: Romanian
- Headquarters: Ungheni
- Circulation: 1250
- Website: www.expresul.md

Expresul is a newspaper published from Ungheni, the Republic of Moldova, founded by Lucia Bacalu.
