= Jurnal Trust Media =

- Industry: Media
- Founded: 2000
- Area served: Moldova
- Products: Television, newspapers
- Website: www.jurnal.md

The Jurnal Trust Media trust is a Moldovan group of media companies.

== Overview ==
The most known company of the group is Jurnal TV. Besides the central office in Chişinău, the channel is working to open representations in Bălţi and Cahul.

The head of Jurnal Trust Media is Val Butnaru. The Trust comprises also newspapers Jurnal de Chişinău, ECOnomist, Apropo Magazin, and radio station Jurnal FM. Its headquarters are in Chişinău.
