= Leonida Lari =

Moldovan politician and writer (1949–2011)

Leonida Lari OR
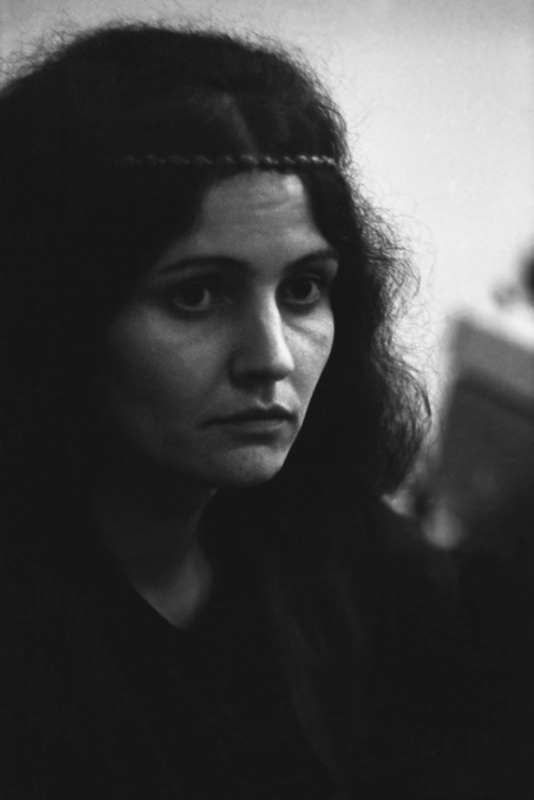
- Lari in 1972

Member of the Chamber of Deputies
- In office 27 November 1996 – 19 December 2008
- Constituency: Suceava

Member of the Chamber of Deputies
- In office 21 October 1992 – 27 November 1996
- Constituency: Galați

People's Deputy of the Soviet Union
- In office 26 March 1989 – 5 September 1991
- Constituency: Ialoveni

Personal details
- Born: 26 October 1949 Bursuceni, Moldavian SSR, Soviet Union
- Died: 11 December 2011 (aged 62) Chişinău, Moldova
- Party: Independent (1993–1996; 2006–2008)
- Other political affiliations: Christian Democratic National Peasants' Party (1992–1993) Greater Romania Party (1996–2006)

Leonida Lari (26 October 1949 – 11 December 2011) was a Romanian poet, journalist, and politician who advocated for the reunion of Bessarabia with Romania. She published 24 volumes of poetry and prose and was a prolific translator of key works from world literature into Romanian.

== Life and career ==
Leonida Lari was born on 26 October 1949 in Bursuceni, Moldovan SSR, one of the former Soviet Socialist Republics of the Soviet Union. Her parents, Ion and Nadejda Tuchilatu, were teachers. Lari had a younger brother, Leonard Tuchilatu, also a poet, who died when he was only 24 of kidney failure after being exposed to radiation while serving in the Soviet army.

Lari graduated from the State University of Chişinău, Moldova, with a major in philology. She worked at the Museum of Literature "D. Cantemir" in Chişinau (1971–1973), was an editor for the journal "Literatură şi Artă" (1985–1988), as well as editor-in-chief (1988–2003) of "Glasul Națiunii", the first publication in the Latin alphabet in the Republic of Moldova.

She was one of the leaders of the movement for national emancipation in Bessarabia between 1988 and 1991. She was elected as a representative to the Supreme Soviet of the Soviet Union (1988–1990) and was a member of the Permanent Bureau of the People's Front of Moldova (1990–1992). Between 1990 and 1992, Lari served as the president of the Christian Democratic League of Women, one of the constituent components of the Social Liberal Party from 2001. In 1992, after repeated threats to the well-being of her children, Lari and her family fled to Bucharest, Romania. Between 1992 and 2008, Lari was a representative to the Chamber of Deputies, first for Galați, and subsequently for Suceava until her retirement from Romanian politics in 2008.

Lari died of cancer in Chișinău, Moldova on 11 December 2011. Her death was followed by a state funeral, during which thousands of Moldovans paid their respects.

== Works ==
- Piaţa Diolei (1974)
- Marele vânt (1980)
- Mitul trandafirului (1985)
- Scoica solară (1987)
- Insula de repaos (1988)
- Lumina graitoare (1989)
- Dulcele foc (1989)
- Anul 1989 (1990)
- Lira şi păianjenul (1991)
- Govorâŝij svet (1992)
- Al nouălea val (1993)
- Epifanii (1994)
- Scrisori de pe strada Maica Domnului (1995)
- Lunaria (1995)
- Aldebaran (1996)
- Între îngeri şi demoni (1998)
- Învingătoarele spaţii (1999)
- Insula de repaus (2000)
- Răstignirea porumbeilor (2003)
- Epifanii şi teofanii (2005)
- Infinitul de aur (2006)
- Sibila (2006)
- Traduceri din lirica universala (2009)
- 101 poeme (2009)

== Awards and distinctions ==
- Knight of the Order of the Republic of Moldova, 1996
- Honorary Citizen of the City of Bacău (1993)
- The România Mare Award
- The "Flacăra, Totuşi Iubirea" Prize
- The Cronica Award (Iaşi)
- The "Tibiscus" Prize - Serbia
- The "Mihai Eminescu" Prize for Poetry, awarded by the Romanian Academy
