= Val Butnaru =

Moldovan journalist and writer

Val Butnaru OR
- Born: 17 April 1955 (age 71); Chişinău, Moldavian SSR, Soviet Union
- Education: Moldova State University
- Occupation: Journalist
- Employer: Jurnal Trust Media
- Known for: head Jurnal Trust Media
- Spouse: Valentina Butnaru
- Children: 3
- Awards: Order of the Republic (Moldova)

Val Butnaru (born 17 April 1955) is a journalist and writer from the Republic of Moldova. He is the founder of Jurnal TV and Jurnal Trust Media.

== Awards ==
- Order of the Republic (Moldova) – highest state distinctions (2009)
- Premiul pentru dramaturgie UNITEM

== Works ==
- Butnaru Val, Apusul de soare se amână (Piese de teatru), Chişinău, Cartier, 2003
- Butnaru Val, Cum Ecleziastul discuta cu Proverbele, Chişinău, ARC, 1999.
- Butnaru Val, Iosif şi amanta sa // Patru texte, patru autori, Chişinău, ARC, 2000
- Butnaru Val, Saxofonul cu frunze roşii, Chişinău, ARC, 1998

== Bibliography ==
- Pohilă Vlad, Val Butnaru – Calendar Naţional, Biblioteca Naţională a Republicii Moldova, 2005
- Cheianu Constantin, Despre teatrul lui Val Butnaru – Butnaru, Val. "Apusul de soare se amână", Chişinău, Cartier, 2003
- Proca Pavel, Mâine, sau poate poimâine se amână; Portrete cu jobenu-n sus, Chişinău, 2004

== See also ==
- Jurnal Trust Media
- Jurnal TV
- Jurnal de Chişinău
