= Kostychany =

Village in Chernivtsi Oblast, Ukraine

Kostychany Костичани
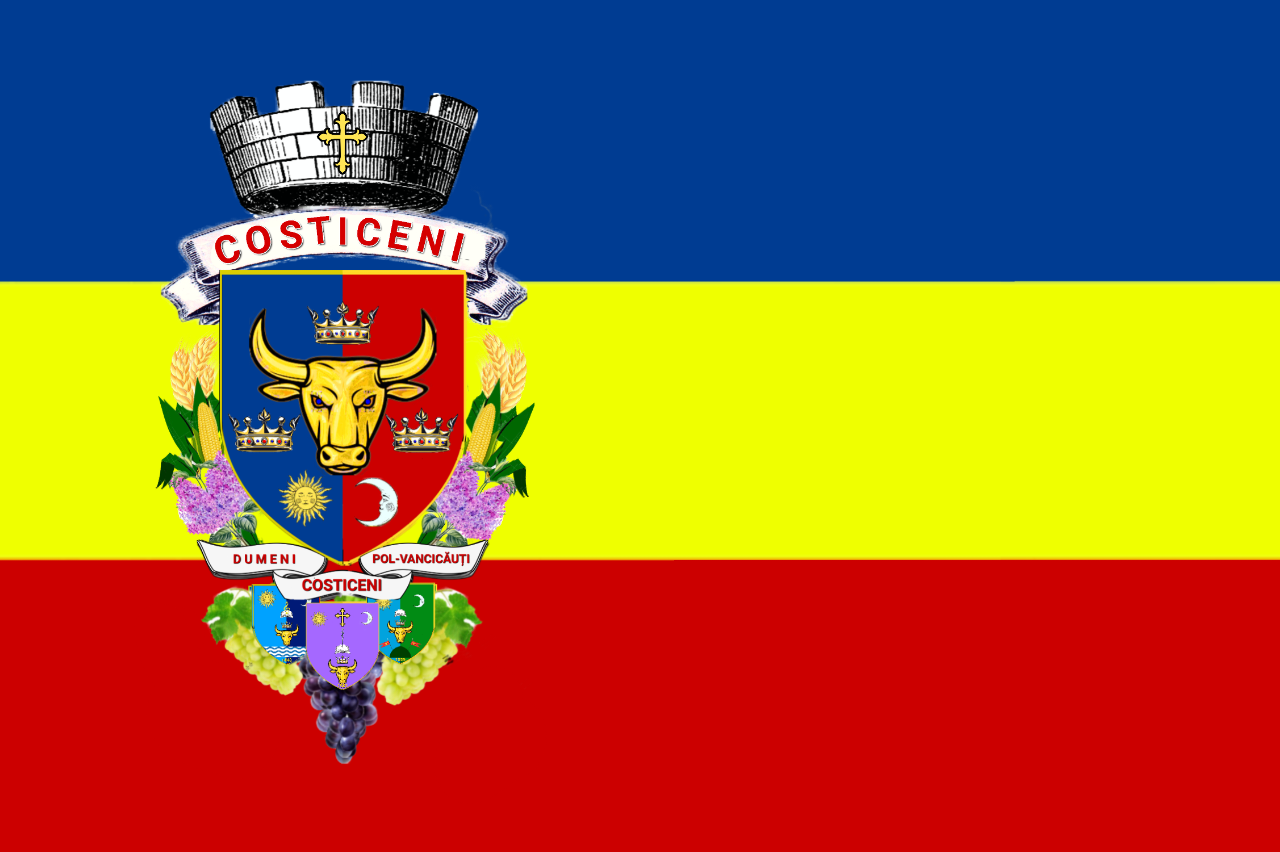
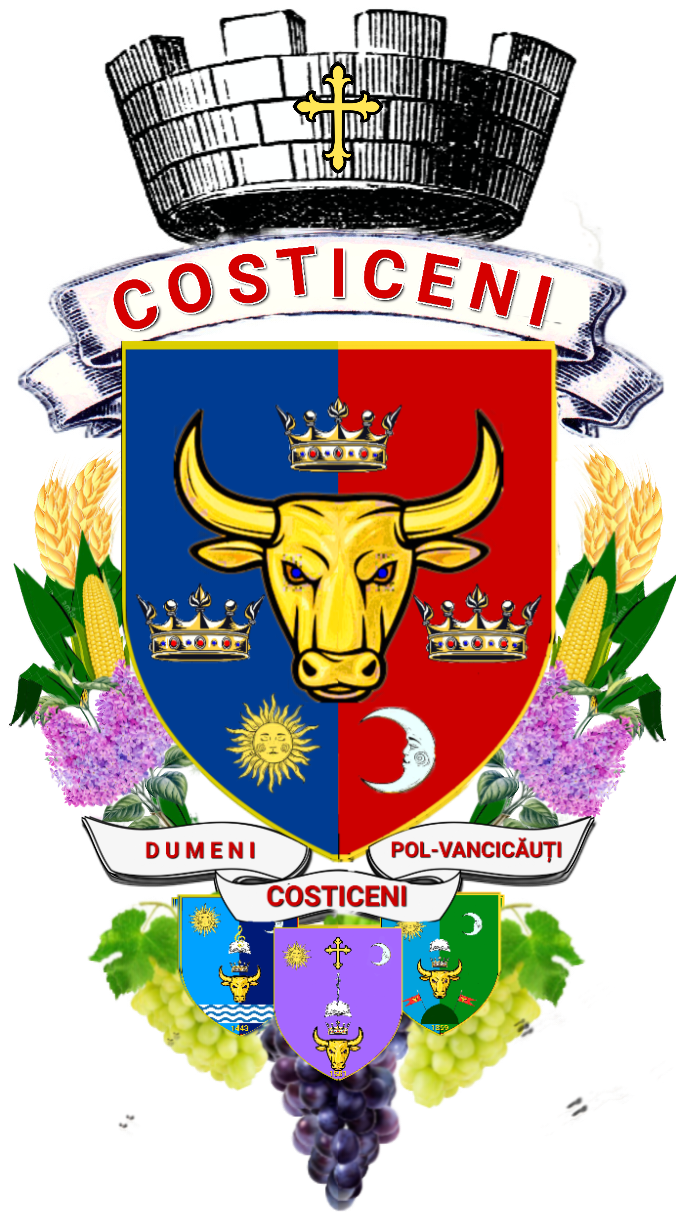
- Flag Coat of arms
- Interactive map of Kostychany
- Location in Ukraine Kostychany (Chernivtsi Oblast)
- Coordinates: 48°13′25″N 26°30′04″E
- Country Oblast Raion: Ukraine; Chernivtsi Oblast; Chernivtsi Raion
- Elevation: 120 m (390 ft)

Population
  - Total: est. 3,450
- Time zone: UTC+2 (EET)
  - Summer (DST): UTC+3 (EET)
- Postal code: 60352

Kostychany (Ukrainian: Костичани, Romanian: Costiceni) is a commune in Chernivtsi Raion, Chernivtsi Oblast (province) of western Ukraine. The commune is composed of three villages: Dumeny (Думени; Dumeni), Kostychany and Novoivankivtsi (Новоіванківці; Пол-Ванчікауць (Pol-Vanchikautsi), Vancicăuții Mici). It belongs to Vanchykivtsi rural hromada, one of the hromadas of Ukraine.

Until 18 July 2020, Kostychany belonged to Novoselytsia Raion, and it was historically a part of Bessarabia. The raion was abolished in July 2020 as part of the administrative reform of Ukraine, which reduced the number of raions of Chernivtsi Oblast to three. The area of Novoselytsia Raion was split between Chernivtsi and Dniester Raions, with Kostychany being transferred to Chernivtsi Raion. In 2001, 95.36% of the inhabitants spoke Romanian as their native language, with Ukrainian (2.87%) and Russian (1.69%) speakers in the minority.

Kostychany village was first officially attested in a document dated 1581.

== Notable people ==
- Toadere Captari (1923–1995), folk musician
- Eugen Pâslaru (1950–2018), politician
- Ion Vatamanu (1937–1993), writer and politician
