= Unghiul =

Moldovan newspaper

- Vezi lumea așa cum este ea!
- Founder: Nicolae Sanduleac
- Deputy editor: Natalia Morari
- Founded: 20 July 1997
- Language: Romanian
- Headquarters: Ungheni
- Country: Moldova
- Circulation: 10,000 (as of 2017)
- Website: unghiul.com

Unghiul (English: The Angle) is a newspaper published in Ungheni, Moldova. It was co-founded in 1997 by Nicolae Sanduleac, who took over as director shortly after and managed the newspaper until his death in 2019.

The first issue was released on 20 July 1997.
