= Sfatul Țării (newspaper) =

- Owner: Parliament of Moldova
- Staff writers: Val Butnaru, Iurie Bălan, Emilian Galaicu-Păun
- Founded: 1989
- Language: Romanian
- Headquarters: Chişinău

Sfatul Țării was a newspaper from the Republic of Moldova, founded in 1989. It was the newspaper of the Parliament of Moldova. Among the authors were: Val Butnaru, Iurie Bălan, Emilian Galaicu-Păun.
