= Leo Butnaru =

Romanian poet

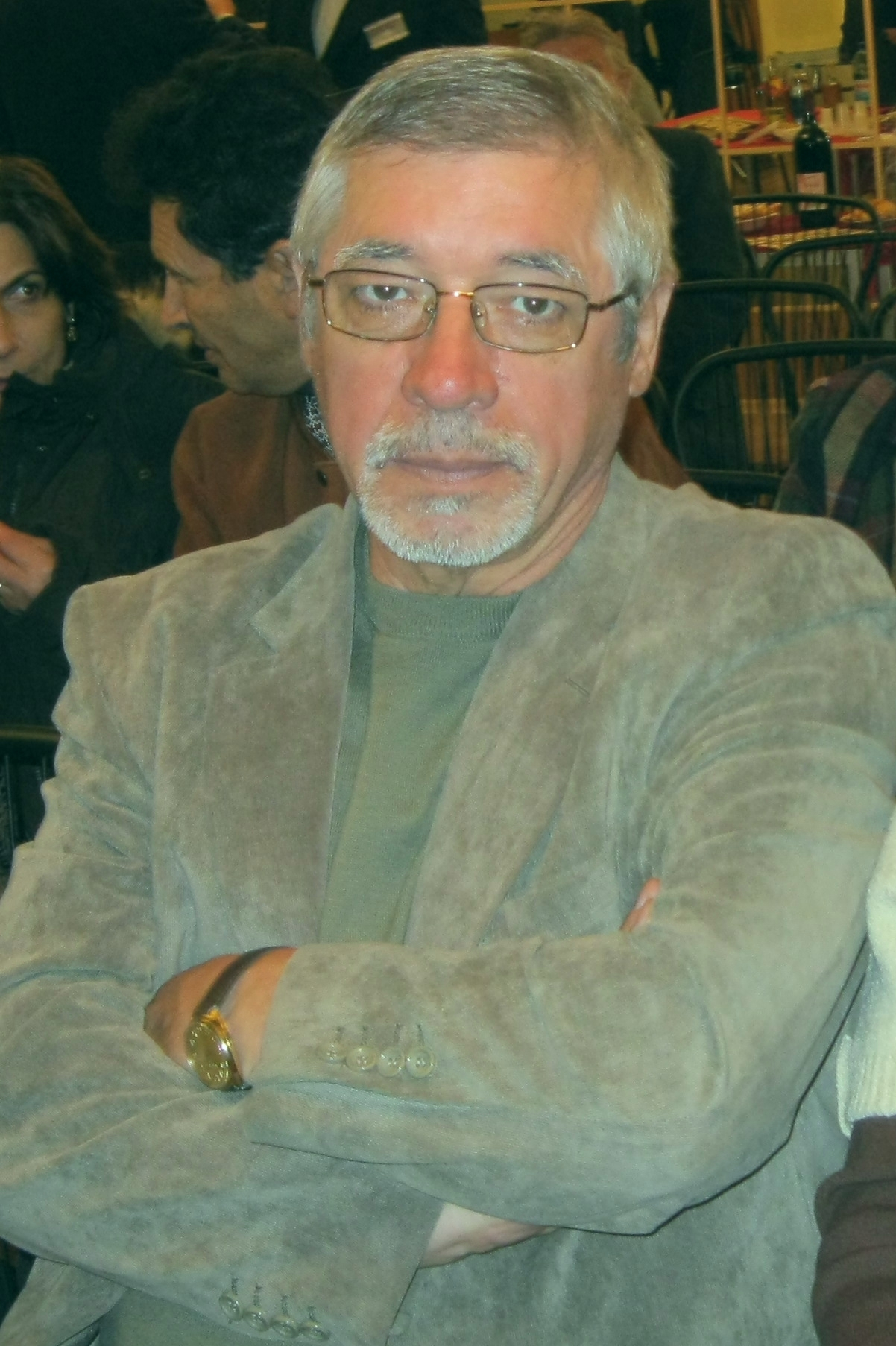
Butnaru in 2011

Leo Butnaru (born 5 January 1949) is a writer from Moldova and Romania. He holds a degree in journalism and philology from the University of Moldova (1972). He has worked in publishing, as editor and editor-in-chief, at magazines such as, Moldovan Youth, Literature and Art, and Moldova. His first poetry publication was a chapbook, Wing in Light (1976). In 1977, he became a member of the Writers Union of the Soviet Union. In the same year, he is removed from the staff of Moldova Youth (following his approval of an article regarding Mihail Kogălniceanu that crossed imperial-communist ideological lines). He is a member of the Romanian Writers Union (1993). He is a founding member of the Moldovan PEN Center. From 1997 to 2005, he was president of the Chisinau branch of the Romanian Writers Union. He is on the board of the Romanian Writers Union.

In 2019 some media sources announced that Leo Butnaru has been nominated for the Nobel Prize for Literature.

== Poetry ==
- Saturday toward Sunday (1983)
- Polite Forms (1985)
- Working Sundays (1988)
- Golden Falcon (1991)
- Access Bridge (1993)
- Necessary Illusion (1993)
- Nonparallel Lives (1997)
- Typewriter Quarantine (1997)
- Necessary Illusion (Anthologies; Ed.Eminescu, 1998)
- Gladiator of Destinies (1998)
- Address Identifier (1999)
- Semiramida's Lament (2000)
- Absolute Essential (2002)
- Alongside the Noose, Flag, and Angel (2002)
- The Fortress Is Not Ready for War (2003)
- Itinerant Sphynx (2004)
- Other, the Same (Editura Litera International, 2003)
- In Case of Danger (Editura Junimea, 2004)
- and The Opposite Direction (2008)
- Daily Order, Nightly Order (Ed. Valman, 2009)
- Robbing Picasso (Ed. Vinea, 2011)
- In a Traffic Jam & Nabokov Partitions (Chisinau, 2012)
- With the Knees on Dices (Ed. Tracus Arte, 2014)
- Instruments of a Sentinel of the Self (Junimea, 2015)
- The Protester and the Pipe Organ (Iasi, "24 Hours Publishing House", 2016)
- Surfing in Galilee (Alfa, 2017)

== Fiction ==
- Why Exactly Tomorrow-The Day After? (1990)
- The Angel and the Seamstress (1998)
- Ulysses' Last Journey (2006)
- Child with the Russians (2008, memoir)
- Romanian Roulette (Ed. RAO – Prut International 2010)
- Angels and laughing-crying (Bucharest, 2011)

== Diaries ==
- Student in the Age of Rinoceri (2000)
- The Perimeter of the Pen (2005)
- "Path with Hieroglyphs" (travels in China, 2007)

== Translations ==
The Russian Avant-Garde (two volumes, 2006), Horizon Testimonial (The Poetic Russian Miniature, two volumes, 2006), The Panorama of the Russian Avantgarde Poetry (2016), The Panorama of the Ukrainian Avantgarde Poetry (2017), volumes by V. Khlebnikov, V. Mayakovski, N. Gumilev, O. Mandelstam, A. Akhmatova, M. Tzvetaeva, L. Dobâcin, D. Kharms, I. Bahterev, Gh. Ayghi, I. Satunovski; and modern poets V. Pavlova, Е. Stepanov, А. Veprev.

His poetry and prose have appeared in Albanian, Armenian, English, Bulgarian, French, Georgian, German, Letton, Macedonian, Russian, Serbian, Slovakian, Spanish, Swedish, Ukrainian, and Hungarian. His books have been published in France, Russia, Germany, Italia, Poland, Serbia, Bulgaria, Azerbaijan, Tatarstan, and Ukraine.

Takes part in international projects.

== Prizes ==
- Many prizes from the Writers Union of Moldova, the Prize of the Writers Union of Romania (1998; 2015);
- the National Prize of the Republic of Moldova (2002);
- the Prize of the Board of the Romanian Writers Union (2008);
- the Prize of the Ministry of Culture of the Republic of Moldova.

State distinctions of Moldova and Romanian.
