= Deșteptarea (newspaper) =

- Publisher: Popular Front of Moldova
- Editor-in-chief: Ștefan Secăreanu
- Associate editor: Sergiu Burcă (deputy editor in chief)
- Founded: May 20, 1989
- Ceased publication: 1990 (successor: Țara)
- Political alignment: Popular Front of Moldova
- Language: Romanian
- Headquarters: Chișinău
- Sister newspapers: Țara

Deșteptarea (English: The Awakening) was a newspaper from the Republic of Moldova founded on May 20, 1989, as a newspaper of the Popular Front of Moldova. Ștefan Secăreanu was the editor in chief and Sergiu Burcă was the deputy editor in chief. The first two issues were printed in the Baltic states. After August 1990, its successor was Țara.

== See also ==
- Glasul

== Bibliography ==
- Partidul Popular Creștin Democrat. Documente și materiale. 1998–2008. Volumul I (1988–1994).
