= Glasul =

Moldovian newspaper

"Glasul" / later, "Glasul Naţiunii"
- Circulation: 150,000 (1989)
- Publisher: Writers' Union of Moldova
- Founder: Leonida Lari
- Founded: 1988
- Based in: Chişinău
- Language: Romanian

Glasul (English: The Voice), known later as Glasul Naţiunii (English: The Nation's Voice), was the first newspaper in the Republic of Moldova to appear in the Latin alphabet during the dying years of the Soviet Union. Glasul Naţiunii was founded in 1988 by Leonida Lari.

== History ==
The first issue of Glasul Naţiunii was printed in Riga in 1988, the second one in Vilnius the same year, and the third one was printed in Chişinău on February 15, 1989. After discovering that copies of the first issue were circulating in Chişinău, Semion Grossu declared the publication illegal.

== See also ==
- Deşteptarea (newspaper)
