= Jurnal TV =

- Country: Moldova
- Broadcast area: Moldova, Romania
- Headquarters: Chișinău, Moldova

Programming
- Languages: Romanian; Russian

Ownership
- Owner: Jurnal Trust Media

History
- Launched: 2009 (Internet); 5 March 2010 (satellite)

Links
- Website: jurnaltv.md

Availability

Streaming media
- Jurnal TV: LIVE!

Jurnal TV is a general TV channel from the Republic of Moldova, launched in 2009 on Internet and in 2010 on air, which transmits in Romanian and partially in Russian. Initially it was created to be the first news television channel of Republic of Moldova, but its focus changed to more general programming on March 5, 2011. Presently, the channel shows news journals, political/social/entertaining shows and talk-shows, movies, TV series, and cartoons dubbed in Romanian or Russian.

The headquarters of Jurnal TV are in Chisinau, Moldova. Jurnal TV is part of the Jurnal Trust Media Holding, which includes the radio station Jurnal FM, the newspaper Jurnal de Chișinău, the economic magazine ECOnomist and the publicity agency Reforma Art.

Jurnal TV HD is the first High Definition (1080i) television channel in Moldova. It began its experimental broadcast on Moldtelecom IPTV Platform from 7 December. Jurnal TV HD broadcasts in 16:9 aspect ratio on both modes: SD and HD and Dolby Surround 5.1 sound on HD, and Stereo on SD.

== Shows and Talk shows ==
Deșteptarea și Deșteptarea de Weekend – A morning show 7/7, with presenters, guests and various sections: Social news, The economic section, Weather, Sport, contests for the viewers, etc.

NOOO – An interactive after-lunch show, that contains information about health, events, relations, beauty and modern technologies.

Veranda – A family-oriented afternoon show. Partially a food show that regularly features special guests from show business.

Ora de Ras – A weekly show that is a filter, mocking the incompetence, the lack of taste and culture, by being ironical and satirical. It covers fields like politics, show-business, mass-media and the life of the simple citizen.

Asfalt de Moldova - Revenirea acasă – A weekly show that does features on interesting personalities in Moldova.

Paparazzi – A weekly show about local celebrities.

Ora Expertizei – Talk show that reflects events of major interest, discussed on the first pages of the entire mass-media.

Cabinetul din Umbră – Political talk show where invited experts debate on the most important political events of the week.

Прямой Разговор – Political talk show about all the fields: sport, religion, the local or international reality, together with special guests and live dialogues.

Mai pe scurt – Immediately after the news Journal at 7 p.m. Political talkshow.

Patrula Jurnal TV – A review of the week about the cruelest crimes and law violations.

== Campaigns ==
Poftă mare, Chișinău! – Every year Jurnal TV viewers are surprised by gourmet records. Jurnal TV presenters are cooking traditional dishes from different countries. It started with Romanian traditional food, then Spanish, Italian, German. At the end of each show the dishes are given to people who decide to spend the Chisinau Day with Jurnal TV's team.

La Cireşe - A unique and very colorful festival that had beaten any record at its first edition, by gathering together more than 20,000 people who have had pleasant surprises, tons of cherry, thousands of pies, and all sorts of fruits and handicrafts.

Moldova, eu chiar te iubesc! – A social campaign launched on 27 August 2011, on the Independence Day, that promotes cultural values.

Târgul Cadourilor Inutile "Fă-ți cadoul util!"- Was held in one of the shopping centers in Chişinau. Visitors were encouraged to exchange unuseful gifts between them, in this way, all gifts become useful.

Moș Crăciun există, Moș Crăciun ești tu! - Is a campaign that promotes the message that each of us can be Santa by helping others. With this occasion Jurnal TV released a Carol that express warmth and love for our fellow.

JurnalTVerde – A greening campaign, which began in Chişinău and expanded to Balţi, Cahul, Ungheni, Orhei. Presenters from Jurnal TV together with celebrities, people from Green Spaces and locals have participated in greening and cleaning parks.

Jurnal TV îți face curte! – Jurnal TV was making stories about the problems that face the tenants and passed them to the local authorities to be solved.

Bea cu minte! – Social campaigns that informed the society of the consequences of drinking alcohol. etc.

== Films, TV series, Cartoons ==
=== Original Films ===
The channel occasionally produces or hosts major holiday and regional cinematic releases:

- Revelion cu dor (2025) – A specialty New Year's Eve feature film highlighting rural Moldovan life, traditions, and music.

=== Original and Broadcast TV Series ===
Jurnal TV has produced several local comedy-dramas and broadcast regional political satires:

- Italia, Patria Nostra (2019) – Celebrated as the first original series produced natively by Jurnal TV, following a theatrical ensemble cast from Chișinău.
- Doi bătrâni de milioane (2025) – A contemporary thriller-comedy series combining dark humor and explosive dialogue.
- Plaha (2025–2026) – A high-profile regional political satire and drama series frequently re-aired during prime-time slots.
- Ștefan și Lenin (2026) – A highly experimental mini-series featuring dialogue and conflicting ideological visions between two main historical-caricature characters.

=== Cartoon Slots ===
While animated content consists of licensed international content, it is strictly cataloged under specific grid blocks:

- Desene Animate Block – General morning programming block for children's animation.
- Because international cartoons on Jurnal TV are licensed through regional distribution networks, they are broadcast with Russian audio dubbing and accompanied by Romanian subtitles.

== Sport competitions ==
- 2026 FIFA World Cup (Jurnal TV will broadcast 32 matches, including both semifinals and the grand final)
- UEFA Champions League
- UEFA Europa League
