= Jurnal FM =

JurnalFM
- Moldova
- Frequencies: 100.1 MHz - Chişinău; See list

Programming
- Format: Moldavian/Romanian contemporary hit radio

Ownership
- Owner: NGO Sănătatea

History
- First air date: 2010

Links
- Webcast: Jurnal FM
- Website: http://jurnalfm.md

Jurnal FM (Romanian: Jurnal FM) is a Moldovan radio station owned by NGO Sănătatea. Jurnal FM started its broadcasting in 2009 as an internet radio station. Starting 25 December 2010, Jurnal FM broadcasts via FM in Chisinau and in other important cities of Moldova. Jurnal FM replaced the old radio station called Radio Sănătatea. Currently Jurnal FM broadcasts news, entertainment and talk show programmes. The format is CHR including 50% Moldovan and 50% Romanian music. Jurnal FM is a highly rated radio station in Chisinau, the capital of the Republic of Moldova.

== Frequencies ==
- Chişinău - 100.1 MHz
- Edineţ - 107.9 MHz
- Şoldaneşti - 99.1 MHz
- Sângerei - 95.2 MHz
- Teleneşti - 88.2 MHz
- Ustia (Dubăsari) - 98.7 MHz
