= Dom Otdykha =

Dom Otdykha (Russian: Дом Отдыха) is the name of several rural localities in Russia.

- Dom Otdykha, Bryansk Oblast, a settlement in Krasnorogsky Rural Administrative Okrug of Pochepsky District in Bryansk Oblast; 52°57′N 33°45′E
- Dom Otdykha, Penza Oblast, an inhabited locality in Nizhnelipovsky Selsoviet of Sosnovoborsky District in Penza Oblast
- Dom otdykha, Tyumen Oblast, a settlement in Klepikovsky Rural Okrug of Ishimsky District in Tyumen Oblast
- Dom otdykha, Volgograd Oblast, a settlement under the administrative jurisdiction of the town of district significance of Kalach-na-Donu in Kalachyovsky District of Volgograd Oblast
- Dom Otdykha Shargol, a former settlement in Komsomolsky District, Khabarovsk Krai
