= Pochepsky =

Pochepsky (masculine), Pochepskaya (feminine), or Pochepskoye (neuter) may refer to:

- Pochepsky District, a district of Bryansk Oblast, Russia
- Pochepsky Urban Administrative Okrug, an administrative division which the town of Pochep in Pochepsky District of Bryansk Oblast, Russia is incorporated as
- Pochepskoye Urban Settlement, a municipal formation which Pochepsky Urban Administrative Okrug in Pochepsky District of Bryansk Oblast, Russia is incorporated as
- Pochepskoye (rural locality), a rural locality (a selo) in Voronezh Oblast, Russia
