= DNS (disambiguation) =

DNS is the Domain Name System, a network system used to translate names into IP addresses. DNS may also refer to:

== Science and technology ==
- Deviated nasal septum, a displaced part of the nose
- 3,5-Dinitrosalicylic acid, an aromatic compound
- Dinalbuphine sebacate, an analgesic
- Direct numerical simulation, a simulation method in computational fluid dynamics
- Dragon NaturallySpeaking, speech recognition software
- "Do not stuff", the omitting of a component on a printed circuit board

== Other uses ==
- Doctor of Nursing Science, an academic research degree
- Det Nødvendige Seminarium, a teacher training college in Denmark
- Demokratski narodni savez (Democratic People's Alliance), a political party in Bosnia and Herzegovina
- Dinas Powys railway station (station code), Wales
- Distressed non-swimmer, a swimming victim type
- Did not start, in the glossary of motorsport terms, also used in other sports
- DNS (retail company), an electronics retailer in Russia

== See also ==
- Didcot, Newbury and Southampton Railway (DN&SR), an English railway 1891–1923
