= Osinovsky, Volgograd Oblast =

Osinovsky Осиновский
- Khutor
- Location within Volgograd Oblast Location within Russia
- Coordinates: 48°59′N 43°21′E
- Country: Russia
- Region: Volgograd Oblast
- District: Kalachyovsky District
- Time zone: UTC+4:00

Osinovsky (Russian: Осиновский) is a rural locality (a khutor) in Golubinskoye Rural Settlement, Kalachyovsky District, Volgograd Oblast, Russia. The population was 78 as of 2010. There are 5 streets.

== Geography ==
Osinovsky is located 50 km northwest of Kalach-na-Donu (the district's administrative centre) by road. Nizhnyaya Buzinovka is the nearest rural locality.
