= Logovsky =

Logovsky Логовский
- Khutor
- Location within Volgograd Oblast Location within Russia
- Coordinates: 48°25′N 43°21′E
- Country: Russia
- Region: Volgograd Oblast
- District: Kalachyovsky District
- Time zone: UTC+4:00

Logovsky (Russian: Логовский) is a rural locality (a khutor) and the administrative center of Logoskoye Rural Settlement, Kalachyovsky District, Volgograd Oblast, Russia. The population was 2,583 as of 2010. There are 37 streets.

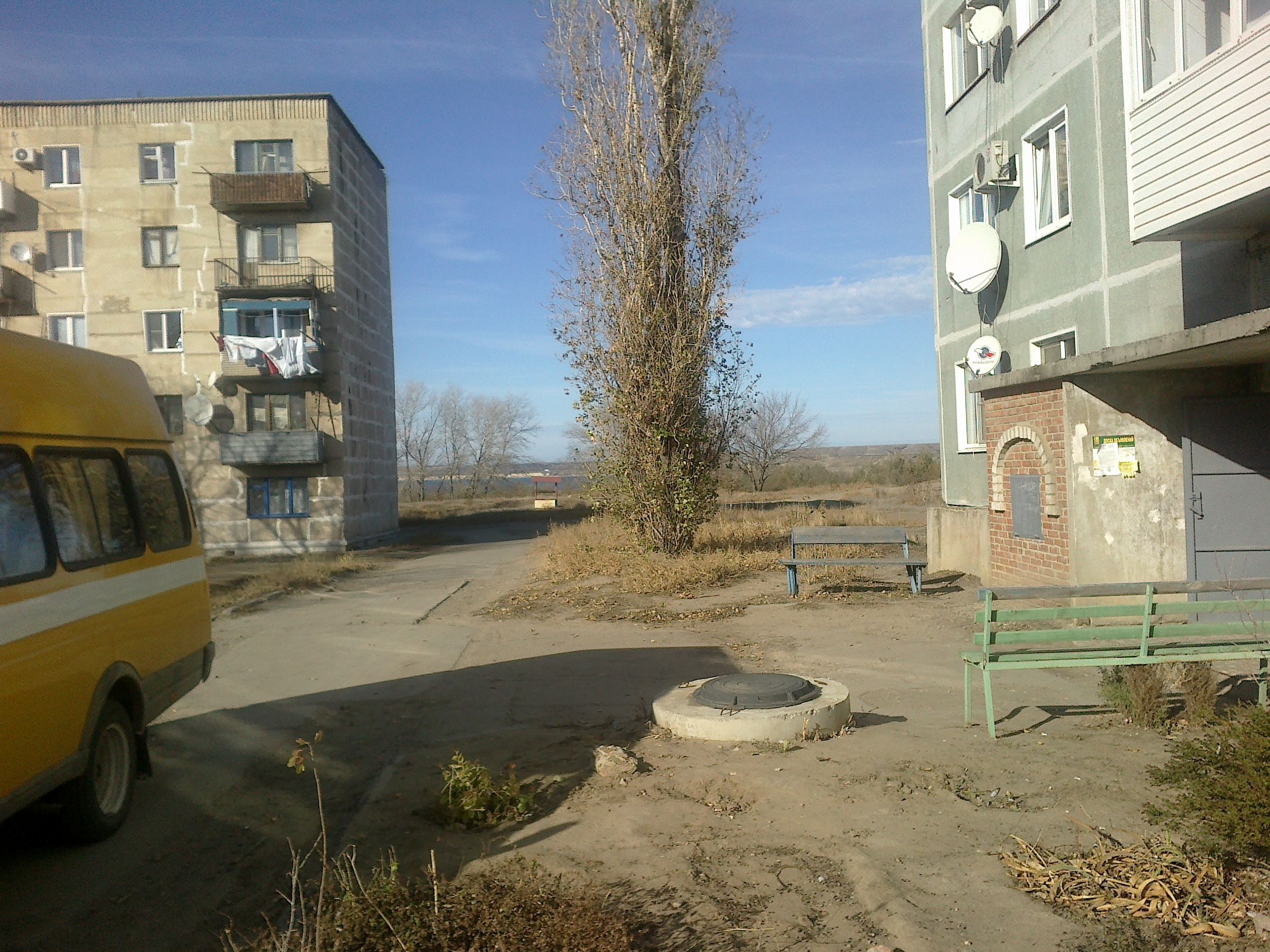
View of Logovsky in 2012.

== Geography ==
Logovsky is located 71 km southwest of Kalach-na-Donu (the district's administrative centre) by road. Pervomaysky is the nearest rural locality.
