= Novolyapichev =

Novolyapichev Новоляпичев
- Khutor
- Location within Volgograd Oblast Location within Russia
- Coordinates: 48°29′N 43°33′E
- Country: Russia
- Region: Volgograd Oblast
- District: Kalachyovsky District
- Time zone: UTC+4:00

Novolyapichev (Russian: Новоляпичев) is a rural locality (a khutor) in Lyapichevskoye Rural Settlement, Kalachyovsky District, Volgograd Oblast, Russia. The population was 360 as of 2010. There are 5 streets.

== Geography ==
Novolyapichev is located 54 km south of Kalach-na-Donu (the district's administrative centre) by road. Novopetrovsky is the nearest rural locality.
