= Mass media in Transnistria =

The mass media of Transnistria, the breakaway territory within the borders of Moldova, features both state-owned or supported outlets and opposition media. Publications are in Russian, with a single newspaper in each of the other two official languages, Moldovan (Romanian), and Ukrainian.

== Media outlets ==
=== Print media ===
Transnistria has 14 newspapers, including several daily papers. Some print media does not have a large circulation, and only appears on a weekly or monthly basis. The oldest newspaper is the Dnestrovskaya Pravda, founded in 1941 in Tiraspol.

The Organisation for Economic Co-operation and Development claims that the media climate in Transnistria is restrictive and that authorities of both banks of Dniester engage in efforts to silence their respective opposition.

In 2005, according to the U.S. Department of State, authorities harassed independent newspapers when they criticized the Transnistrian government. Most Moldovan newspapers did not circulate widely in Transnistria, although they were available in Tiraspol.

However, several opposition newspapers exist in Transnistria. They include Rîbnița-based Dobry Den, Chelovek i ego prava (Man and His Rights), Novaya Gazeta from Bender, Russian Proriv!, Profsoyuznye Vesti and Glas Naroda.

The Tiraspol Times was an English-language website. Article from it were always featured in the official website Pridnestrovie.net.

Newspapers published by the government or in favour of the government include Trudovoi Tiraspol, Pridnestrovye, Novy Dnestrovskiy Kuryer, Gomin (in Ukrainian), Adevărul Nistrean (in Moldovan, but written in the Cyrillic alphabet).

=== Radio broadcasting ===
A state owned radio station, "Radio PMR", broadcasts both via FM and on frequency 7290 kHz shortwave, 41 meter band, as well as via the Internet. Four privately owned commercial radio stations broadcast on FM from Transnistria. They are: "Inter FM", "Dynamite FM", "EnergyRadio.FM", "Frequence3". The owners of opposition newspaper "Novaia Gazeta" plan to establish an independent radio station.

=== Television broadcasting ===
There are four TV channels in Transnistria. Two of them are local (to Tiraspol and Tighina/Bender), while two of them cover all of Transnistria.

Television in Transnistria was for a long time dominated by the public service company TV PMR. In 1998, Transnistria's first commercial channel, TSV (Television of Free Choice) was started. Cable television operator "MultiTV" carries 24 television channels for its "premium" package and 5 channels for "social" package. Moldovan TV stations from outside Transnistria are not available through cable but can be seen via an aerial. However ProTV and NIT, two private channels based in Chişinău, was introduced to on most cable networks in Transnistria from September 2009 and 1 November 2007 respectively.

=== Internet ===
Transnistrian internet media has both state-owned and privately operated entities. In Russian, the websites include RIA Dniester (news agency), Olvia Press (official state news agency, now Novosti Pridnestrovya), Tiraspol Info (news aggregator), Pridnestrovie.info. Many political organizations and government departments also have their own news services and online news pages, not listed here.

RIA Dniester has been blocked by Transnistrian authorities since November 8, 2012 according to the website.

In August 2014, Yevgeny Shevchuk issued a decree on combating extremism that empowered the Transnistrian KGB to request the prosecutor's office to block internet content. Authorities would take such a determination following a review by a panel appointed by the KGB.

== Media freedom and pluralism ==
The Transnistrian media environment is restrictive, and is dominated numerically by state-owned media (e.g. Pridnestrovie and Dnestrovskaya Pravda, which are the region major newspapers), or by media controlled through public institutions, such as State Tele-radio Company and State Service media. They are subsidized, heavily politicized, and do not criticize the authorities.

The Sheriff company dominates the private media market, including private broadcasting, cable television, and internet service. Sheriff represents a "so-called opposition" according to IPRE. According to an IREX report they serve the interest of the company.

There are some independent newspapers or magazines, with small circulation and little advertising, but they have been able to create a space of freedom of expression. They receive threats from the authorities, that sometimes even take direct control.

The government hinders critical media and journalists are intimidated. Since 2014 government agencies, private organizations, and citizens are required to report instances of "extremist" material online. Journalists expressing opinions different from those of the media owners are easily dismissed. Self-censorship is practised, with local press avoiding subjects questioning the Transnistrian goal of independence or criticizing the pro-Russian foreign policy.

Media of Moldova have little presence in Transnistria, being available mainly in Tiraspol. Moldovan channels are blocked. Moldovan journalists need accreditation to enter the country, and they are sometimes denied entrance or detained.

In 2015 activist and journalist Serghei Ilcenko was detained for four months. The Transnistrian KGB then warned other activists who were accused of having posted "extremist messages" on the internet and, in general, warned internet users to trust only official sources, and not to contest Transnistrian independence.

On September 1, 2014 Transnistrian police detained a television crew from Publika TV while travelling to a school in Corjova village to produce a piece on the first day of school at a Latin script school. Transnistrian police detained the crew on the grounds that they lacked a special authorization from the Transnistrian Security Service. After a few hours of interrogation, police released the crew.

In April, 2022, American journalist Collin Mayfield was detained by Transnistrian police before being strip searched and interrogated at the Ministry of State Security (MGB) headquarters in Tiraspol. Mayfield, who had previously been covering the Russian invasion of Ukraine, was deported to Moldova on charges of violating a 2016 media law against criticizing Russian troops in Transnistria.

== Transnistrian propaganda ==
In 2006, The Economist reported that an alleged propagandistic campaign, aimed at English-speaking audience had been underway. This was done through an agency entitled the "International Council for Democratic Institutions and State Sovereignty" (ICDISS). It was claimed in The Economist that the ICDISS had links to a number of English-language websites that were all pro-Transnistrian but had very few details about how and where they are produced. In particular, it highlighted the Wikipedia article on the group, Pridnestrovie.net and Visitpmr.com. The latter two are both described as "propaganda sites for Transdniestria". pridnestrovie.net and visitpmr.com have acknowledged help from the ICDISS . The ICDISS email is run by someone self-named Ms Stephenson, also interviewed in Tiraspol Times.

=== International Council for Democratic Institutions and State Sovereignty ===
The council is credited with producing a report in support of Transdniestrian independence. All but one of the alleged authors of the report has since denied involvement in the study. The case has provoked suspicions among Western officials like Louis O'Neill, the head of the OSCE Mission to Moldova. Journalist Edward Lucas, who wrote the original Economist story about the organization, says he could find little information about the think tank. "What's really remarkable is that nobody's been able to produce any credible proof or verifiable proof that they have any existence," Lucas says.,

=== Pridnestrovie.net ===
The websites quote a number of Westerners marvelling at Tiraspol's new football stadium or saying Transdniester is the French Riviera compared to Moldova proper.

The site also claimed that the country "has a free market economy, 200% growth, and a multi-party democracy with the opposition in control of parliament."

=== Tiraspol Times (tiraspoltimes.com) ===
Tiraspol Times was a short lived (2006–2008) English language news provider focused on Transnistria. It published an online newspaper, a free news feed service, and, according to its own site, a weekly colour magazine and a print newspaper in tabloid format available at "select locations" in Transnistria, but not abroad and with no subscription available. It professed to be "committed to the truth" and whose content was largely dedicated to effusive praise of the government or endorsing independence.

Online texts by the Tiraspol Times were licensed as freely distributable. Articles from it have been reprinted by UNPO and by the United Nations' Global Action on Aging, as well as various news organizations.

Tiraspol Times has been criticised as being strongly biased in favour of the Transnistrian authorities and Transnistrian independence. A report in the Economist described it as part of a concerted online campaign to promote Transnistria through expertly produced websites, saying that its background and funding were largely undisclosed.

The Radio Free Europe claims that its content was "largely dedicated to effusive praise of the government or endorsing independence", while the Economist associates them with ICDISS, which it alleges is an astroturfing attempt. Economist also names Tiraspol Times an online magazine produced "expertly, but mysteriously, in support of the authorities".

The site published few ads and its funding sources are not known. Edward Lucas, a journalist for Economist, suggested it could have received its funding either from the government, from Vladimir Antyufeyev's State Security Committee or from one of the Transnistrian companies.

Tom de Waal, a London-based journalist and author, was outraged to see an article under his name appear on the "Tiraspol Times" website. "I've certainly never been to Pridnestrovie, Transdneister, or Moldova, and I am certainly not arguing, as is written under my name, that Pridnestrovie has a better case for independence than Kosovo," de Waal said.

== See also ==
- Telecommunications in Transnistria
- Human rights in Transnistria
