= Svetly Log =

Svetly Log Светлый Лог
- Khutor
- Location within Volgograd Oblast Location within Russia
- Coordinates: 48°41′N 43°19′E
- Country: Russia
- Region: Volgograd Oblast
- District: Kalachyovsky District
- Time zone: UTC+4:00

Svetly Log (Russian: Светлый Лог) is a rural locality (a khutor) in Pyatiizbyanskoye Rural Settlement, Kalachyovsky District, Volgograd Oblast, Russia. The population was 343 as of 2010. There are 6 streets.

== Geography ==
Svetly Log is located 22 km west of Kalach-na-Donu (the district's administrative centre) by road. Kalach-na-Donu is the nearest rural locality.
