= Krepinsky =

Krepinsky Крепинский
- Settlement
- Location within Volgograd Oblast Location within Russia
- Coordinates: 48°21′N 43°41′E
- Country: Russia
- Region: Volgograd Oblast
- District: Kalachyovsky District
- Time zone: UTC+4:00

Krepinsky (Russian: Крепинский) is a rural locality (a settlement) and the administrative center of Krepinskoye Rural Settlement, Kalachyovsky District, Volgograd Oblast, Russia. The population was 827 as of 2010. There are 13 streets.

== Geography ==
Krepinsky is located 74 km southeast of Kalach-na-Donu (the district's administrative centre) by road. Beloglinsky is the nearest rural locality.
