= Parkhomenko, Volgograd Oblast =

Parkhomenko Пархоменко
- Settlement
- Location within Volgograd Oblast Location within Russia
- Coordinates: 48°34′N 44°08′E
- Country: Russia
- Region: Volgograd Oblast
- District: Kalachyovsky District
- Time zone: UTC+4:00

Parkhomenko (Russian: Пархоменко) is a rural locality (a settlement) in Zaryanskoye Rural Settlement, Kalachyovsky District, Volgograd Oblast, Russia. The population was 427 as of 2010. There are 10 streets.

== Geography ==
Parkhomenko is located on the bank of the Volga-Don Shipping Canal, 56 km southeast of Kalach-na-Donu (the district's administrative centre) by road. Vodny is the nearest rural locality.
