= Posyolok otdeleniya 2 sovkhoza Volgo-Don =

Posyolok otdeleniya 2 sovkhoza Volgo-Don Посёлок отделения № 2 совхоза «Волго-Дон»
- Settlement
- Location within Volgograd Oblast Location within Russia
- Coordinates: 48°40′N 43°57′E
- Country: Russia
- Region: Volgograd Oblast
- District: Kalachyovsky District
- Time zone: UTC+4:00

Posyolok otdeleniya 2 sovkhoza Volgo-Don (Russian: Посёлок отделения № 2 совхоза «Волго-Дон») is a rural locality (a settlement) in Bereslavskoye Rural Settlement, Kalachyovsky District, Volgograd Oblast, Russia. The population was 510 as of 2010. There are 3 streets.

== Geography ==
The settlement is located on south bank of the Volga–Don Canal, 36 km east of Kalach-na-Donu (the district's administrative centre) by road. Karpovka is the nearest rural locality.
