= Stepanevka =

Stepanevka Степаневка
- Khutor
- Location within Volgograd Oblast Location within Russia
- Coordinates: 48°23′N 43°56′E
- Country: Russia
- Region: Volgograd Oblast
- District: Kalachyovsky District
- Time zone: UTC+4:00

Stepanevka (Russian: Степаневка) is a rural locality (a khutor) in Buzinovskoye Rural Settlement, Kalachyovsky District, Volgograd Oblast, Russia. The population was 228 as of 2010. There are 7 streets.

== Geography ==
Stepanevka is located on the left bank of the Donskaya Tsaritsa River, 64 km southeast of Kalach-na-Donu (the district's administrative centre) by road. Yarki-Rubezhny is the nearest rural locality.
