= Buzinovka =

Buzinovka Бузиновка
- Khutor
- Location within Volgograd Oblast Location within Russia
- Coordinates: 48°30′N 43°53′E
- Country: Russia
- Region: Volgograd Oblast
- District: Kalachyovsky District
- Time zone: UTC+4:00

Buzinovka (Russian: Бузиновка) is a rural locality (a khutor) and the administrative center of Buzinovskoye Rural Settlement, Kalachyovsky District, Volgograd Oblast, Russia. The population was 645 as of 2010. There are 9 streets.

== Geography ==
Buzinovka is located in steppe, on Yergeni, 51 km southeast of Kalach-na-Donu (the district's administrative centre) by road. Yarki-Rubezhny is the nearest rural locality.
