= Ovrazhny =

Ovrazhny Овражный
- Settlement
- Location within Volgograd Oblast Location within Russia
- Coordinates: 48°19′N 43°46′E
- Country: Russia
- Region: Volgograd Oblast
- District: Kalachyovsky District
- Time zone: UTC+4:00

Ovrazhny (Russian: Овражный) is a rural locality (a settlement) in Krepinskoye Rural Settlement, Kalachyovsky District, Volgograd Oblast, Russia. The population was 306 as of 2010. There are 9 streets in Ovrazhny.

== Geography ==
Ovrazhny is located 82 km southeast of Kalach-na-Donu (the district's administrative centre) by road. Krepinsky is the nearest rural locality.
