= Malogolubinsky =

Malogolubinsky Малоголубинский
- Khutor
- Location within Volgograd Oblast Location within Russia
- Coordinates: 48°54′N 43°35′E
- Country: Russia
- Region: Volgograd Oblast
- District: Kalachyovsky District
- Time zone: UTC+4:00

Malogolubinsky (Russian: Малоголубинский) is a rural locality (a khutor) in Golubinskoye Rural Settlement, Kalachyovsky District, Volgograd Oblast, Russia. The population was 171 as of 2010. There are 2 streets.

== Geography ==
Malogolubinsky is located on the right bank of the Don River, 44 km north of Kalach-na-Donu (the district's administrative centre) by road. Bolshenabatovsky is the nearest rural locality.
