= Kolpachki =

Kolpachki Колпачки
- Khutor
- Location within Volgograd Oblast Location within Russia
- Coordinates: 48°36′N 43°35′E
- Country: Russia
- Region: Volgograd Oblast
- District: Kalachyovsky District
- Time zone: UTC+4:00

Kolpachki (Russian: Колпачки) is a rural locality (a khutor) in Primorskoye Rural Settlement, Kalachyovsky District, Volgograd Oblast, Russia. The population was 352 as of 2010. There are 19 streets.

== Geography ==
Kolpachki is located 45 km southeast of Kalach-na-Donu (the district's administrative centre) by road. Pyatimorsk is the nearest rural locality.
