= Pervomaysky, Kalachyovsky District, Volgograd Oblast =

Pervomaysky Первомайский
- Khutor
- Location within Volgograd Oblast Location within Russia
- Coordinates: 48°23′N 43°20′E
- Country: Russia
- Region: Volgograd Oblast
- District: Kalachyovsky District
- Time zone: UTC+4:00

Pervomaysky (Russian: Первомайский) is a rural locality (a khutor) in Logoskoye Rural Settlement, Kalachyovsky District, Volgograd Oblast, Russia. The population was 226 as of 2010. There are 9 streets.

== Geography ==
Pervomaysky is located 75 km southwest of Kalach-na-Donu (the district's administrative centre) by road. Logovsky is the nearest rural locality.
