= Ryumino-Krasnoyarsky =

Ryumino-Krasnoyarsky Рюмино-Красноярский
- Khutor
- Location within Volgograd Oblast Location within Russia
- Coordinates: 48°48′N 43°35′E
- Country: Russia
- Region: Volgograd Oblast
- District: Kalachyovsky District
- Time zone: UTC+4:00

Ryumino-Krasnoyarsky (Russian: Рюмино-Красноярский) is a rural locality (a khutor) in Ilyevskoye Rural Settlement, Kalachyovsky District, Volgograd Oblast, Russia. The population was 132 as of 2010. There are 17 streets.

== Geography ==
Ryumino-Krasnoyarsky is located in steppe, on Yergeny, 22 km north of Kalach-na-Donu (the district's administrative centre) by road. Golubinskaya is the nearest rural locality.
