= Bolshenabatovsky =

Bolshenabatovsky Большенабатовский
- Khutor
- Location within Volgograd Oblast Location within Russia
- Coordinates: 48°56′N 43°38′E
- Country: Russia
- Region: Volgograd Oblast
- District: Kalachyovsky District
- Time zone: UTC+4:00

Bolshenabatovsky (Russian: Большенабатовский) is a rural locality (a khutor) in Golubinskoye Rural Settlement, Kalachyovsky District, Volgograd Oblast, Russia. The population was 76 as of 2010.

== Geography ==
Bolshenabatovsky is located in steppe, on Yergeny, 50 km north of Kalach-na-Donu (the district's administrative centre) by road. Malogolubinsky is the nearest rural locality.
