= Ilyevka =

Ilyevka Ильевка
- Settlement
- Location within Volgograd Oblast Location within Russia
- Coordinates: 48°38′N 43°38′E
- Country: Russia
- Region: Volgograd Oblast
- District: Kalachyovsky District
- Time zone: UTC+4:00

Ilyevka (Russian: Ильевка) is a rural locality (a settlement) and the administrative center of Ilyevskoye Rural Settlement, Kalachyovsky District, Volgograd Oblast, Russia. The population was 1,451 as of 2010. There are 26 streets.

== Geography ==
Ilyevka is located in steppe, on south of the Volga Upland, on the north bank of the Karpovskoye Reservoir, 10 km southeast of Kalach-na-Donu (the district's administrative centre) by road. Pyatimorsk is the nearest rural locality.
