= Morskoy =

Morskoy Морской
- Khutor
- Location within Volgograd Oblast Location within Russia
- Coordinates: 48°32′N 43°24′E
- Country: Russia
- Region: Volgograd Oblast
- District: Kalachyovsky District
- Time zone: UTC+4:00

Morskoy (Russian: Морской) is a rural locality (a khutor) in Pyatiizbyanskoye Rural Settlement, Kalachyovsky District, Volgograd Oblast, Russia. The population was 46 as of 2010.

== Geography ==
Morskoy is located 32 km southwest of Kalach-na-Donu (the district's administrative centre) by road. Pyatiizbyansky is the nearest rural locality.
