= Proriv (Transnistria) =

Political party in Transnistria (2006–2012)

Proriv Прорыв
- Leader: Dmitry Soin
- Head of Communications: Roman Konoplev
- Youth Wing Director: Alena Arshinova
- Founded: 2 June 2006
- Banned: 8 November 2012
- Headquarters: 1A-3300 Naberezhnye Lane, Tiraspol
- Newspaper: Russian Breakthrough
- Ideology: Social democracy; Russian nationalism; Russophilia; Eurasianism
- International affiliation: Proryv
- Colors: Yellow
- Slogan: "Russia! PMR! Breakthrough!"

Website
- proriv.wordpress.com

Proriv (Russian: Прорыв, romanized: Proryv, lit. 'Breakthrough'), officially the People's Democratic Party "Proriv!", was a pro-Russia political youth movement and political party in Transnistria. Its methods were supposedly modelled on pro-Western organizations Otpor!, Kmara and other participants of colour revolutions in the post-Soviet states.

== History ==
Proriv was originally founded in 2005 as a division of the pro-Russian political youth organization Proriv. A year later, on 2 June 2006, the Transnistrian branch of Proriv was registered as a political party. It used yellow as its political color, and the famous black-and-white photo of communist guerrilla fighter Che Guevara (Guerrillero Heroico) as a symbol. It was associated with the "Che Guevara High School for Political Leadership" in Tiraspol, which was established to provide training for young political activists. The organization supported the continuation of the republic's independence which was declared on 2 September 1990, and rejected any talk of potential reunification with Moldova.

Proriv's head was Dmitry Soin, a sociologist and former officer of the Transnistrian ministry of state security, who is wanted by Interpol. Roman Konoplev, a Russian strategist and publicist, took part in formulating ideological documents of the party.

The youth movement had a mostly Slavic female leadership, with Alena Arshinova at its head.

The party was dissolved by authorities in November 2012 after the Supreme Court of Transnistria ordered its liquidation. Members of Proriv denounced the decision as political repression.

== Ideology ==
The party identified as social democratic and pro-Russia.

== Electoral results ==
=== Parliamentary ===
Supreme Council
Election year	Seats	+/–	Government
2010	1 / 43	▲1	Opposition

=== Presidential ===
Election year	Candidate	Votes	%	Position	Result
2011	Dmitry Soin	1,441	0.58	5th	Not elected
