= Arshinov (surname) =

Arshinov, feminine: Arshinova is a Russian surname. Notable people with the surname include:

- Alena Arshinova (born 1985), Russian politician, model and sociologist
- Peter Arshinov (1886–1937), Russian anarcho-communist
