= Sergey Ilchenko =

Moldovan-Ukrainian journalist and Marxist essayist from Transnistria

- Сергей Ильченко; Сергій Ільченко
- Ilchenko in 2016
- Born: 25 October 1959 (age 66); Chișinău, Moldavian SSR, Soviet Union (now Moldova)
- Occupations: Journalist, commentator, editor, essayist
- Employer: Delovaya Stolitsa

Sergey Eduardovich Ilchenko (Note: In this name that follows East Slavic naming customs, the patronymic is Eduardovich and the family name is Ilchenko.) (Note: Romanian: Serghei Ilcenko; Russian: Сергей Эдуардович Ильченко; Ukrainian: Сергій Едуардович Ільченко, romanized: Serhii Eduardovych Ilchenko) (born 25 October 1959) is a Moldovan and Ukrainian journalist and Marxist essayist from the unrecognised state of Transnistria. His professional work focuses on regional political analysis, media dynamics, and left-wing political theory within the post-Soviet space.

== Media career ==
Ilchenko began his journalism career in the Moldovan press, contributing to regional publications including Săptămână, Kommunist, and Nezavisimaya Moldova.

From January 2002 to December 2006, he served as the editor-in-chief of the Transnistrian weekly newspaper Dnestrovsky Courier. In 2004, he also took on the role of editorial director for the regional edition of Komsomolskaya Pravda in Transnistria. Beginning in January 2007, Ilchenko worked as an independent freelance journalist, regularly contributing analytical commentary to various regional news outlets and agencies, including DNIESTER News Agency, AVA.MD, and the Russian news agency REGNUM.

As an author and political commentator, Ilchenko co-authored Goly Voronin ("Voronin Exposed"). His theoretical writings include the books Drugim putyom ("By Another Path") and Mir v dvizhenii ("The World in Motion").

== 2015 arrest and international response ==
On 18 March 2015, Ilchenko was detained by authorities from the Transnistrian Committee for State Security (KGB) on charges related to online extremism. The case sparked a significant international response: the detention was condemned by the Committee to Protect Journalists (CPJ), and was noted in United States Department of State human rights reports as a case of political persecution.

His detention was documented by multiple human rights portals, including ZMINA, Media Azi, Europa Liberă, and Moldova.org. He was released on 17 July 2015 under an amnesty decree.

== Subsequent activities ==
Since July 2017, Ilchenko has resided in Kyiv, Ukraine. He works as a political columnist for the digital magazine Delovaya Stolitsa and is a member of the Independent Media Union of Ukraine.
