= Volgodonskoy (rural locality) =

Volgodonskoy Волгодонской
- Settlement
- Location within Volgograd Oblast Location within Russia
- Coordinates: 48°38′N 43°43′E
- Country: Russia
- Region: Volgograd Oblast
- District: Kalachyovsky District
- Time zone: UTC+4:00

Volgodonskoy (Russian: Волгодонской) is a rural locality (a settlement) and the administrative center of Sovetskoye Rural Settlement, Kalachyovsky District, Volgograd Oblast, Russia. The population was 1,272 in 2010. There are 14 streets.

== Geography ==
Volgodonskoy is located 33 km southeast of Kalach-na-Donu (the district's administrative centre) by road. Oktyabrsky is the nearest rural locality.
