= Volgodonskoy =

Volgodonskoy (masculine), Volgodonskaya (feminine), or Volgodonskoye (neuter) may refer to:

- Volgodonskoy District, a district of Rostov Oblast, Russia
- Volgodonskoy (rural locality), a rural locality (a settlement) in Volgograd Oblast, Russia
