= Vialky =

Village in Pochepsky District, Russia

Coordinates: 52.8833°N 33.3167°E

Vialky (Russian: Вяльки, romanized: V'al'ki) is a village in Pochepsky District of Bryansk Oblast, near the federal route M13 (Bryansk – Novozybkov – state border with Belarus). Vialky is situated on the Nemolodva river, about 95 km away from Bryansk, 10 km from Pochep, Bryansk Oblast. The population is 87 people (2002). Vialky has Nemolodva railway station.

== Gallery ==
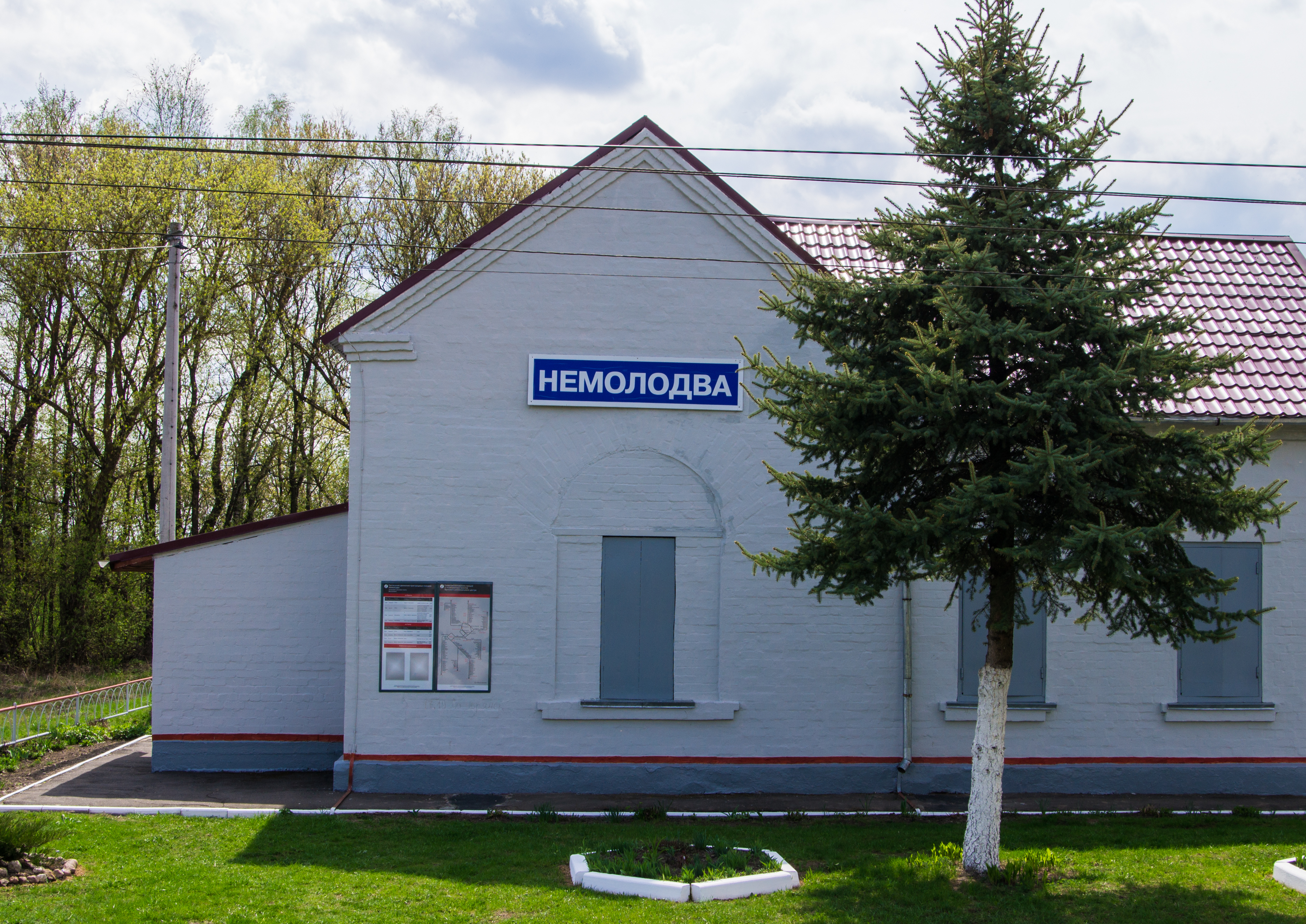
Nemolodva station

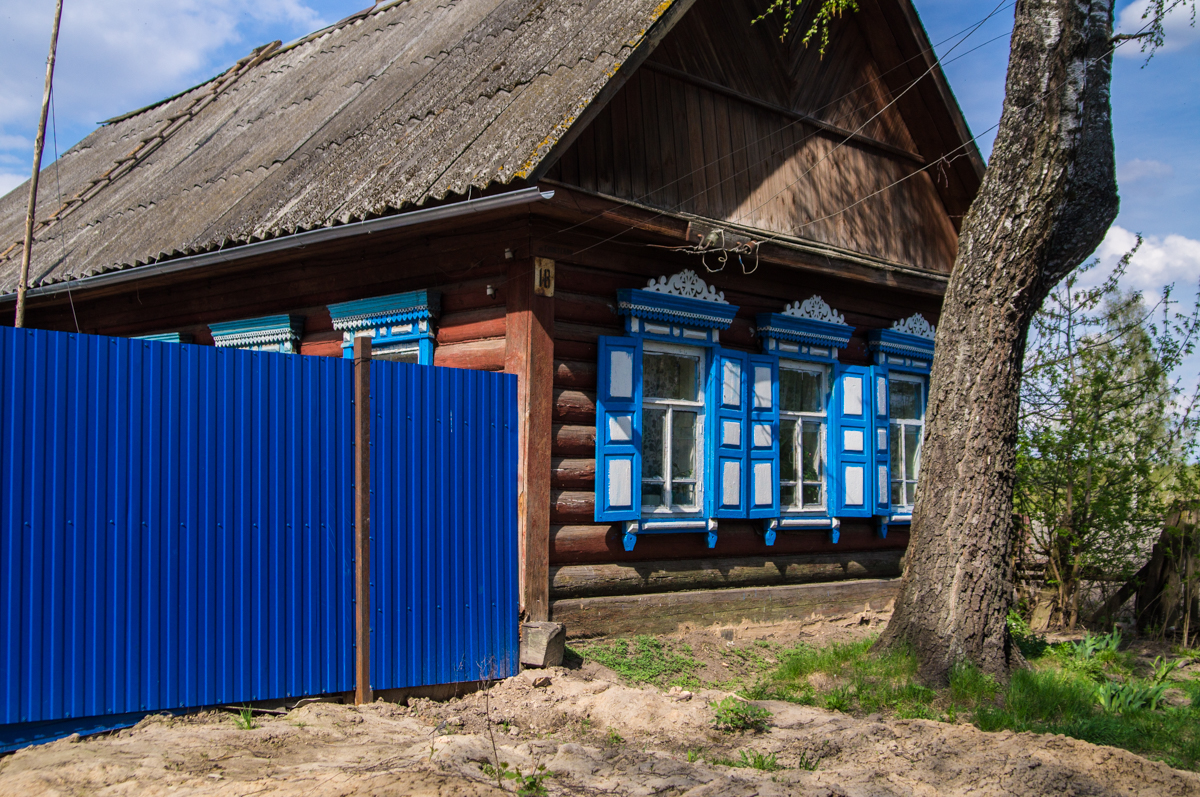
House in Vialky

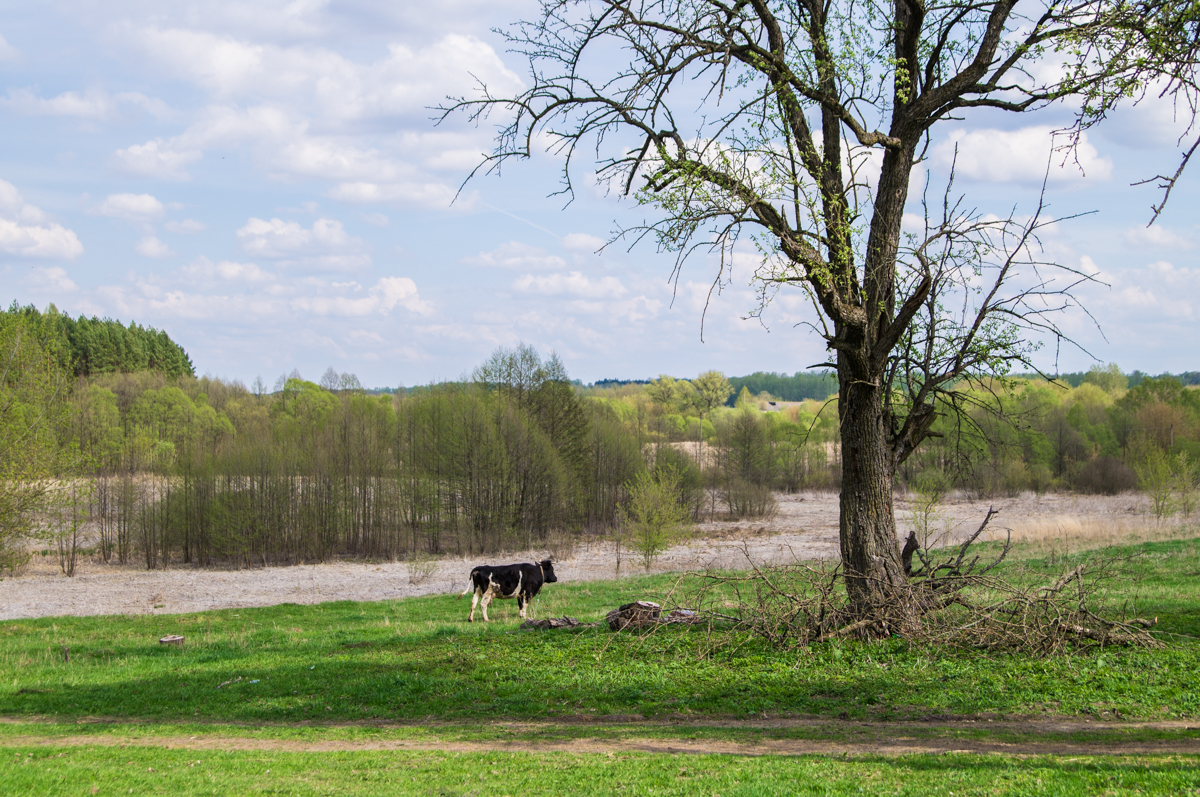
Vialky, meadow

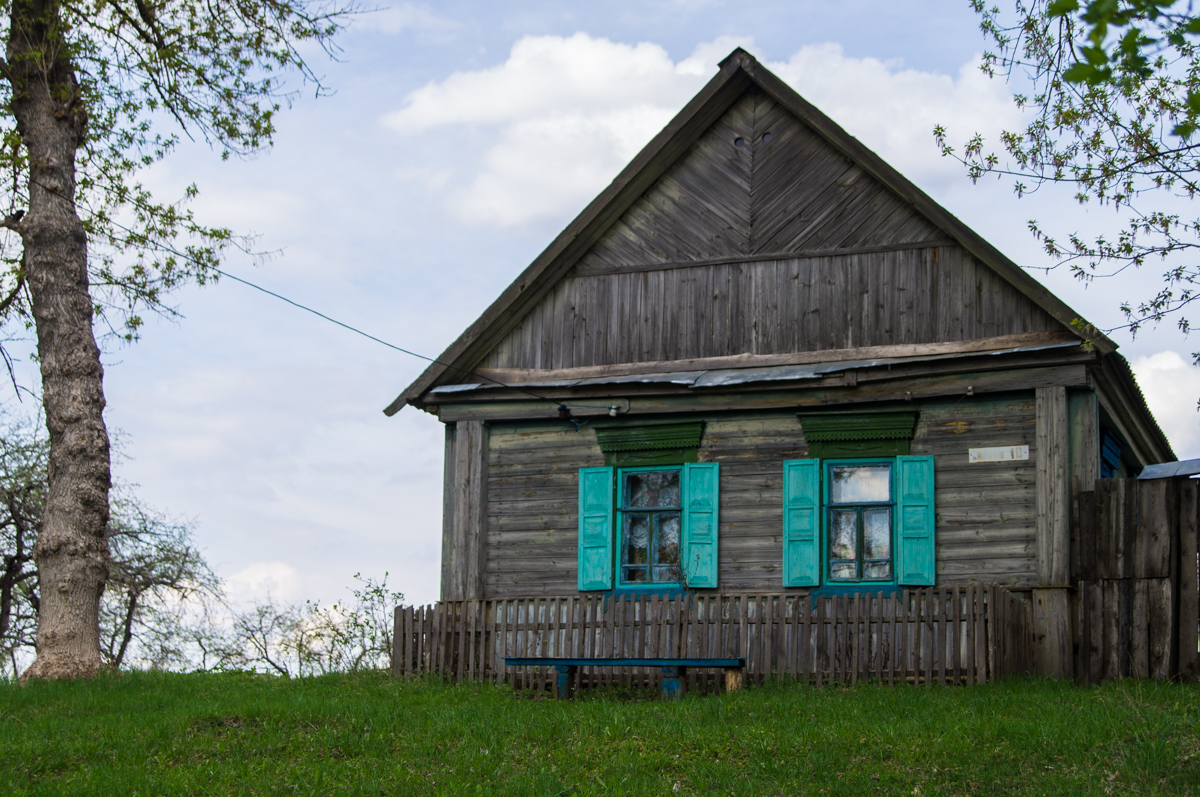
House in Vialky, Nagornaya street

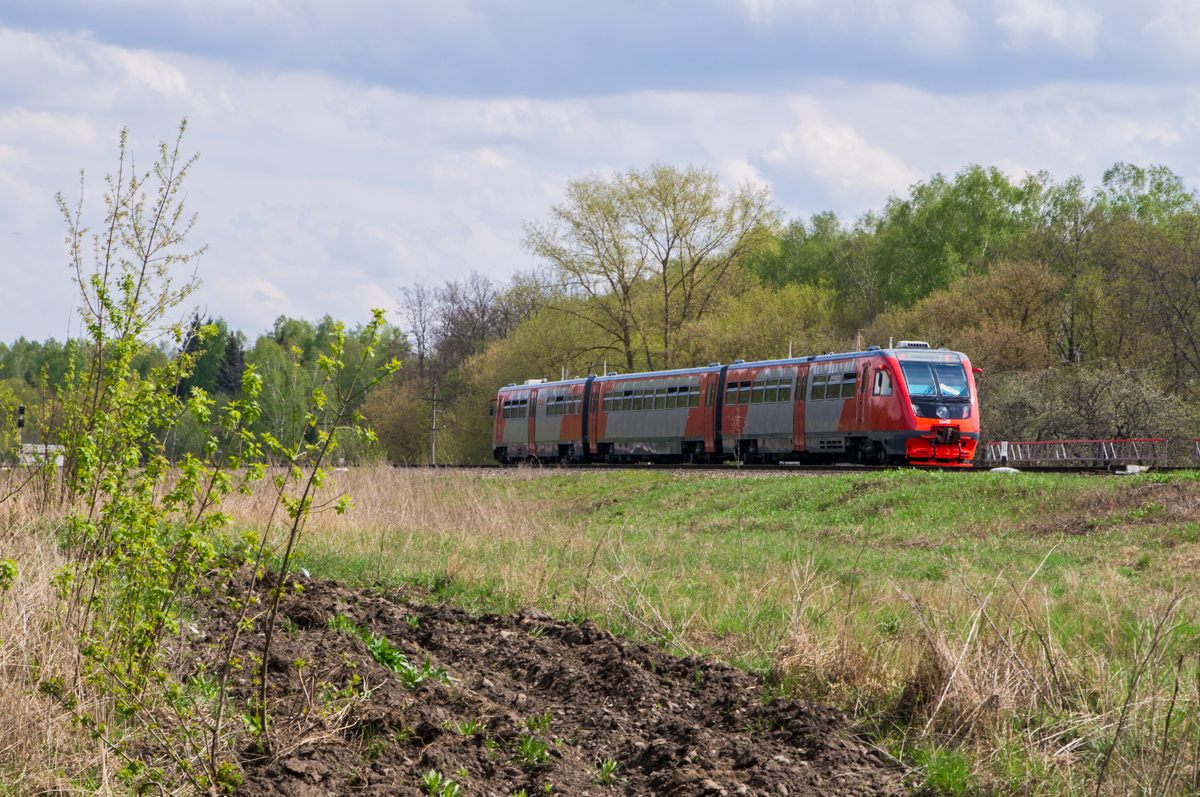
Train arrives to Nemolodva station

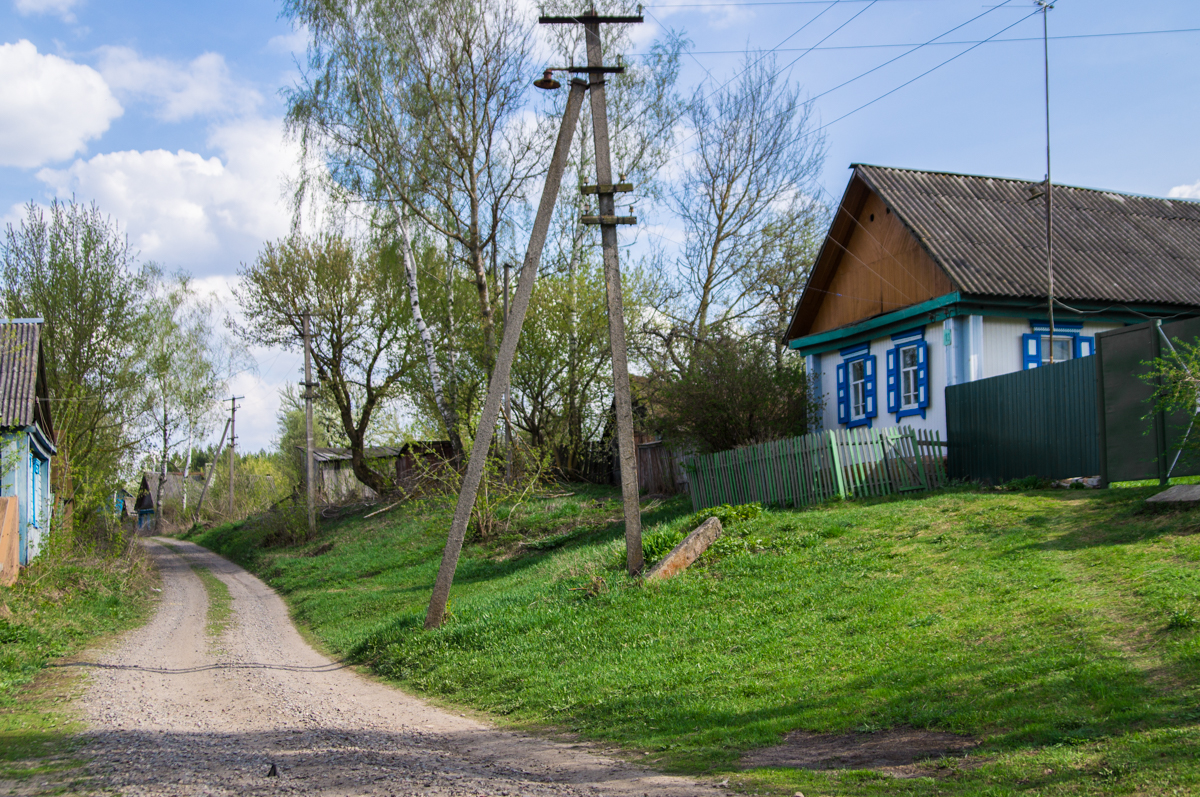
House in Vialky
