= Telecommunications in Transnistria =

Despite many economic and social difficulties, Communications in Transnistria is well developed, including a CDMA2000 1xRTT network for mobile phones.

== Numbers ==
Telephones - main lines in use: 150,000 land lines (est., 2006) (Two operators: JSC Interdnestrcom, Trans-Tele-Com)

Telephones - mobile cellular: 140,000 (est., 2006) (About 71% belong to JSC Interdnestrcom, a CDMA operator. The rest are GSM)

Telephone system: Digital infrastructure, privatization of all services

Radio broadcast stations: AM 5, FM 6, shortwave N/A (2006)

Television broadcast stations: 3 (2 covering all of Transnistria, 1 municipal for Tiraspol and Bender)

Internet service providers (ISPs): 2 (2005)

== See also ==
- Media in Transnistria
