= Proryv =

Youth organisation in Transnistria, South Ossetia, Abkhazia, and Ukraine

Proryv (Russian: Прорыв, lit. 'Breakthrough') is a pro-Russian Eurasianist international youth organization which has branches in the non-recognized countries of Transnistria (where it is a recognized as an official party and can field candidates for elections to the Supreme Soviet), South Ossetia, Abkhazia and in Crimea in Ukraine.

Proriv activists took part in the June 2006 anti-NATO protests in Feodosiya; Proriv leader Alexei Dobychin, was deported from Ukraine 21 June 2006.

== See also ==
- Proriv (Transnistria)
- Politics of Transnistria
