= Lenta PMR News Agency =

Transnistrian news agency

Lenta PMR Лента ПМР
- Company type: Private limited company
- Industry: News media
- Founded: July 2004
- Defunct: December 2012
- Headquarters: Tiraspol, Transnistria (Moldova)
- Area served: Worldwide
- Key people: Roman Konoplev (Editor 07.2004–03.2008), Dmitry Soin (Editor 04.2008–2013)
- Products: Wire service
- Website: tiras.ru

Lenta PMR (Russian: Лента ПМР) was a non-governmental, nationwide online news service disseminating news primarily from the breakaway state of Transnistria in internationally recognized Moldova.

== History ==
Lenta PMR was founded in July 2004 by Russian strategist and publicist Roman Konoplev. The agency published news and analysis of social-political, economic, scientific and financial subjects on the internet and via email. The main purpose of the project was to analyse the situation in the internationally unrecognized state of Transnistria (also known as Pridnestrovie) and the rest of Moldova.

After the 2011 presidential election in Transnistria, the agency adopted an opposition-leaning stance. In December 2012, the news agency was banned by the Transnistrian government. The last editor-in-chief of Lenta PMR was the Transnistrian politician Dmitry Soin.
