= Dom otdykha, Volgograd Oblast =

Dom otdykha Дом отдыха
- Settlement
- Location within Volgograd Oblast Location within Russia
- Coordinates: 48°39′N 43°30′E
- Country: Russia
- Region: Volgograd Oblast
- District: Kalachyovsky District
- Time zone: UTC+4:00

Dom otdykha (Russian: Дом отдыха) is a rural locality (a settlement) in Kalachyovskoye Rural Settlement, Kalachyovsky District, Volgograd Oblast, Russia. The population was 109 as of 2010.

== Geography ==
Dom otdykha is located 41 km southeast of Kalach-na-Donu (the district's administrative centre) by road. Kolpachki is the nearest rural locality.
