= Alena Arshinova =

Russian politician, model and sociologist (born 1985)

Alena Arshinova MP
- Алёна Аршинова
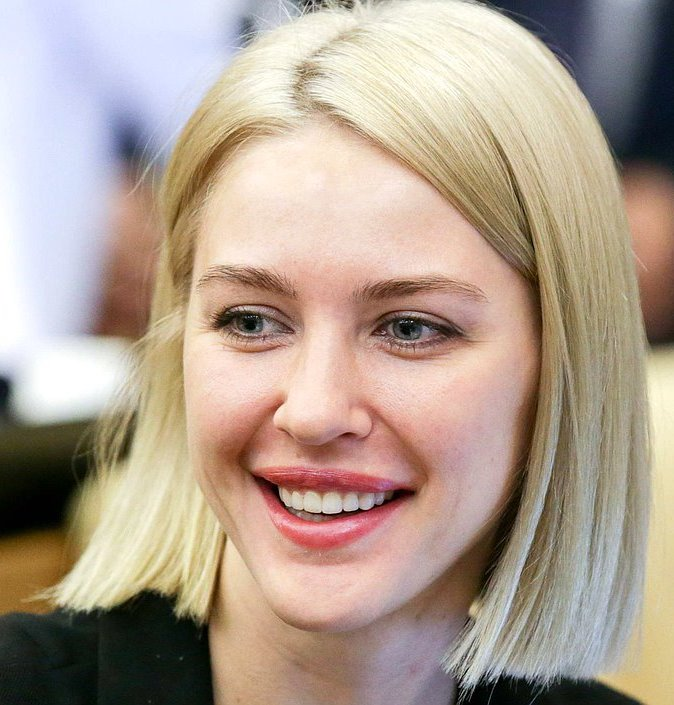
- at a session of the Duma in autumn of 2018

Member of the State Duma (Party List Seat)
- Incumbent
- Assumed office 4 April 2012
- Preceded by: Konstantin Kosachev

Personal details
- Born: 3 March 1985 (age 41) Dresden, East Germany
- Party: United Russia
- Education: Transnistrian State University; Moscow State University; MFA Diplomatic Academy (MIA); PRUE (MEc); VAGSH
- Occupation: Professor

Alena Igorevna Arshinova (Note: Also transliterated as Alyona Igorevna Arshinova) (Russian: Алёна Игоревна Аршинова; born 3 March 1985 in Dresden, East Germany), is a Russian politician, model, and academic. She is a deputy of the State Duma and a member of the Presidium of the General Council of the United Russia political party. She was Secretary of the Chuvash regional branch of United Russia from 24 June 2020 to 21 February 2022.

Within the Duma, Arshinova belongs to the United Russia faction and sits as a member of the State Duma Committee on Education. In the 7th State Duma, she was a member of the Committee on Education and Science.

== Biography ==
Alyona Arshinova was born in 1985 in Dresden where her father was stationed as part of the Group of Soviet Forces in Germany. Arshinova holds dual citizenship of Russia and Republic of Moldova. From 2002 to 2007 she studied sociology at the state university of Transnistria, the T.G. Shevchenko University in Tiraspol.

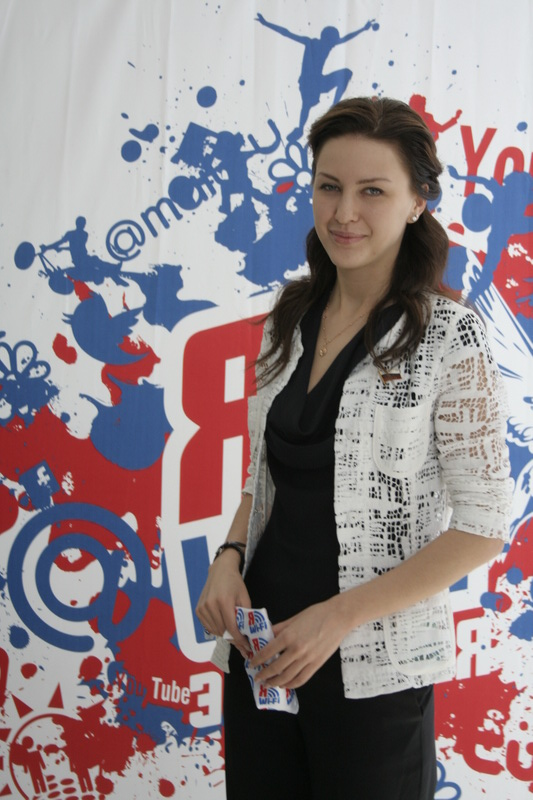
Alyona Arshinova in 2012

Arshinova led the political youth organization Breakthrough (Russian: Proriv) which defends the independence of Transnistria with close ties to Russia, and opposes union with Moldova. She has written articles for the Transnistrian news agency «Lenta PMR». In December 2005 Arshinova was interviewed by the German news magazine Der Spiegel. In 2009 she was a fellow of the John Smith Memorial Trust programme for democracy and good governance.

In 2007, Alyona Arshinova moved to Moscow for postgraduate work in sociology at Lomonosov University. Her dissertation is titled "Youth Extremism in Russia".

From July to December 2010, Arshinova was Deputy Chief of the Central Headquarters of the Young Guard of United Russia, and from December 2010 to August 2012, co-chairman of the Coordinating Council of the Young Guard. For the 2011 Russian legislative election, she contested a seat in the State Duma.

On 28 March 2012, Arshinova became a deputy of the State Duma of the Federal Assembly of the Russian Federation of the sixth convocation as a member of the United Russia faction, having received the mandate of Konstantin Kosachev, who was appointed head of Rossotrudnichestvo.

On 26 May 2012, at the XIII United Russia Party Congress, Arshinova became a party member, having received a party card from the party chairman, Dmitry Medvedev. On the same day, she was elected to the Presidium of the General Council of the Party.

In 2013–2017, Arshinova was the head of the United Russia party project "Kindergartens for Children" and curator of the Expert Council on Preschool Education under the State Duma Committee on Education of the Federal Assembly of the Russian Federation. She yielded leadership of the party project to Larisa Tutova. Since 2013, she is Coordinator of the Youth Club under the Presidium of the General Council of the United Russia party.

In September 2016, she was elected to the State Duma of the Russian Federation of the 7th convocation on the federal list from United Russia (No. 5 in the regional group No. 16, the Republic of Mari El, the Republic of Mordovia, the Chuvash Republic – Chuvashia, Nizhny Novgorod Oblast).

In June 2020, Arshinova became the Secretary of the Chuvash regional branch of United Russia. She resigned from this position on 21 February 2022.

== Deputy of the State Duma ==
=== Election ===
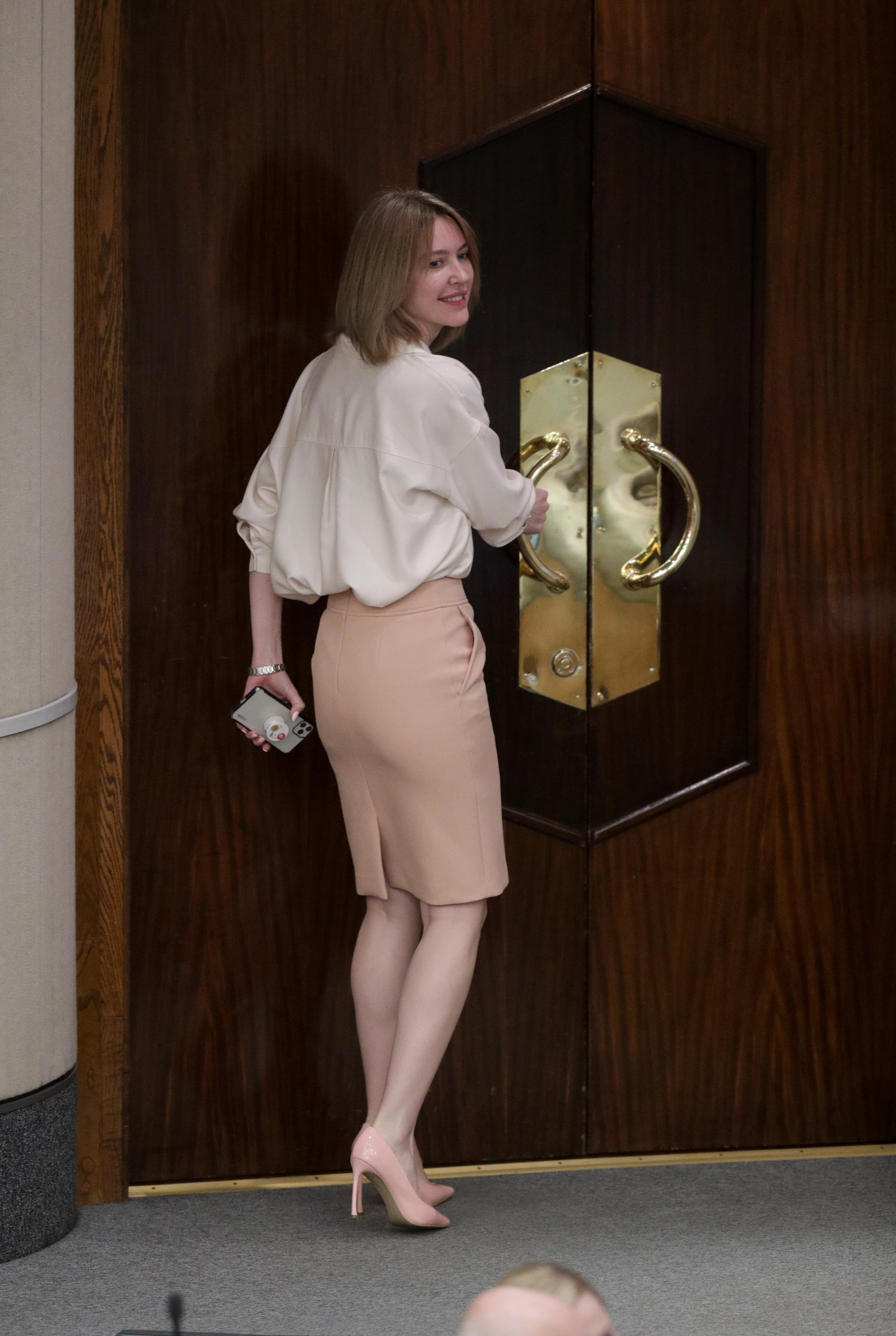
At the door of the State Duma, 2021

During the 2011 Russian legislative election, Arshinova ran for the 6th State Duma on the list of United Russia, but was not allocated a seat based on the results.

On 28 March 2012, the Central Election Commission, having considered the decision of the Presidium of the General Council of United Russia, transferred the mandate of the deputy of the State Duma of Russia of the sixth convocation from Chuvashia, which became vacant due to the appointment of Konstantin Kosachev to the post of head of Rossotrudnichestvo, to Arshinova.

On 17 April 2012, Arshinova visited Chuvashia for the first time, from which she became a deputy of the State Duma. The region's opposition reacted negatively to the mandate transfer to Arshinova. The head of the Communist Party faction in the State Council of Chuvashia, Dmitry Yevseyev, called the loss of the United Russia mandate a "shame" for the republic. He was supported by the leader of the regional branch of the party Patriots of Russia, Vladislav Soldatov. As deputy of the State Duma of the Russian Federation from Chuvashia, Arshinova spoke about the benefits of the voluntary study of the Chuvash language and, simultaneously, against being forced to do so in the schools of Chuvashia.

She was re-elected to the 7th State Duma in the 2016 Russian legislative election and subsequently the 8th State Duma in the 2021 Russian legislative election.

=== Activity ===
On 16 May 2012, Arshinova was appointed Deputy Chairman of the State Duma Committee on Education.

=== Letter against Anatoly Karpov ===
On 21 January 2013, it became known that nine United Russia members (including Alena Arshinova and Frants Klintsevich) wrote a letter to the Ministry of Justice with a request to check the Peace and Harmony Foundation, founded by the International Association of Peace Foundations, chaired by their colleague from the United Russia party Anatoly Karpov. The signatories wanted the ministry to determine if the foundation was a "foreign agent." Arshinova said, "We want to know the answer – does it receive funding from abroad and does it participate in the political life of the country?"

The letter followed after Anatoly Karpov proposed to exclude from the "anti-tobacco law" the article "Prevention of illegal trade in tobacco products and tobacco products includes ...", which, in particular, provides for control over the production of cigarettes. Karpov himself explained his proposal by the fact that such an article is already provided for by international law.

== Awards ==
She has been awarded the Medal of the Order "For Merit to the Fatherland", 2nd class

== Sanctions ==
Due to her support of Russian aggression and violation of Ukraine’s territorial integrity during the Russo-Ukrainian war, she is under personal international sanctions imposed by multiple countries.

On 23 February 2022, she was added to the European Union’s sanctions list for actions and policies that undermine the territorial integrity, sovereignty, and independence of Ukraine, and that further destabilize the country.

On 24 February 2022, she was placed on Canada’s sanctions list of “close associates of the regime” for her vote to recognize the independence of the "so-called republics in Donetsk and Luhansk".

On 24 March 2022, in the context of Russia’s invasion of Ukraine, she was added to the U.S. sanctions list for "participating in Putin’s war" and "supporting the Kremlin’s efforts to invade Ukraine". The U.S. Department of State stated that members of the State Duma use their positions to persecute dissenters and political opponents, suppress freedom of information, and restrict human rights and fundamental freedoms of Russian citizens.

For similar reasons, she has been under UK sanctions since 11 March 2022; Swiss sanctions since 25 February 2022; Australian sanctions since 26 February 2022; Japanese sanctions since 12 April 2022; Ukrainian sanctions by presidential decree of Volodymyr Zelenskyy dated 7 September 2022; and New Zealand sanctions since 3 May 2022.

Criminal prosecution

On 22 March 2023, a Ukrainian court sentenced Alyona Arshinova in absentia to 15 years in prison with confiscation of property under charges of encroachment on Ukraine’s territorial integrity and inviolability.

== See also ==
- Young Guard of United Russia
- Breakthrough (Transnistria)
