= Dmitry Soin =

Transnistrian politician (born 1969)

Dmitry Yuryevich Soin (Russian: Дмитрий Юрьевич Соин; born 7 August 1969) is a Transnistrian sociologist and politician.

== Biography ==
Dmitry Soin was born on 7 August 1969 in the city of Tiraspol, in the Moldavian SSR of the Soviet Union. He fought in the Transnistria War and afterwards served in the Armed Forces of Transnistria from 1993 to 2007, retiring with the rank of lieutenant colonel.

In 1994, Moldovan authorities brought criminal charges of murder against Soin, who killed a Tiraspol resident with a service weapon in a claimed act of self-defense. Soin was declared an internationally wanted suspect by Interpol in 2004.

From 2010 to 2015, Soin was a member of the Supreme Council of Transnistria, representing his party, Proriv. He was also director of the Che Guevara School of Political Leadership.

In 2014, Soin moved to Moscow, Russia. Since 2018, Soin has been a Russian nationalist activist, a leader of the Russian All-People's Union and an ex-leader of the Rodina political party led by Sergey Baburin.

== U.S. sanctions ==
On 10 December 2021, the U.S. Department of the Treasury added Soin to its Specially Designated Nationals (SDN) list. Individuals on the list have their assets blocked and U.S. persons are generally prohibited from dealing with them.
