= Russian Proriv! (Transnistrian newspaper) =

Russian-language weekly newspaper (2007–2012)

- Type: Weekly newspaper
- Format: D3
- Editor-in-chief: Roman Konoplev (2007–2008)
- Photo editor: Rodion Kalinkin
- Staff writers: Sergey Ilchenko, Anatoly Panin, Galina Berezhanskaya, Vitaly Olhovich, Olga Trishina
- Founded: January 2007
- Ceased publication: 2012
- Language: Russian
- Headquarters: Tiraspol, Transnistria, Moldova
- Circulation: 10,000 (2007)

Russian Proriv! (Russian: Русский Прорыв, lit. “Russian Breakthrough”) was a Russian‑language weekly newspaper published in Tiraspol, the capital of Transnistria (also known as Pridnestrovie). It appeared from 2007 until 2012.

The newspaper was printed four times a month and consisted of seven folded D3‑sized sheets. Its circulation in 2007 was approximately 10,000 copies.

The first editor‑in‑chief was Roman Konoplev (Russian: Роман Коноплёв), who headed the editorial office from 2007 to 2008.
