= Dom Otdykha Shargol =

Dom Otdykha Shargol Дом отдыха «Шарголь»
- Interactive map of Dom Otdykha Shargol
- Location of Dom Otdykha Shargol Dom Otdykha Shargol (Khabarovsk Krai)
- Coordinates: 50°42′57″N 137°19′18″E
- Country: Russia
- Federal subject: Khabarovsk Krai

Dom Otdykha Shargol (Russian: Дом отдыха «Шарголь», lit. 'Shargol Rest Home') is an abolished rural locality (a settlement) in the Komsomolsky District of Khabarovsk Krai, Russia. It was administratively incorporated as part of the Galichnoye Rural Settlement before its official decommissioning.

== Geography ==
The settlement is situated on the right bank of the Amur River, positioned southeast of Komsomolsk-on-Amur. It was named after the adjacent Shargol island and water channel system.

== History ==
The site originally opened in 1939 on the left bank of the Amur River before expanding its modern footprint. Throughout the Soviet and post-Soviet eras, the locality operated primarily as an asset of the Komsomolsk-on-Amur Aircraft Plant (KnAAZ), serving as a dedicated recreational resort and health retreat for aerospace factory workers and their families.

On June 25, 2018, the resort property was transferred from the factory's corporate ownership to the regional youth administration ("Kraevoy Dom Molodezhi") and renamed Gorod Yunosti (City of Youth). It continues to function as an educational campground, seasonal sports hub, and venue for regional Far Eastern youth forums.

Due to having a negligible permanent resident population, the locality was formally abolished as an independent administrative unit on May 23, 2024, by the Legislative Duma of Khabarovsk Krai under regional Law No. 496. It was officially scrubbed from the regional geographical registry later that year.

== Demographics ==
The settlement maintained a minimal baseline population consisting primarily of facility maintenance staff and caretakers:

- 2010 Census: 4 inhabitants
- 2021 Census: 2 inhabitants
