= Pochepskoye (rural locality) =

Pochepskoye Почепское
- Selo
- Location within Voronezh Oblast Location within Russia
- Coordinates: 51°11′N 39°28′E
- Country: Russia
- Region: Voronezh Oblast
- District: Liskinsky District
- Time zone: UTC+3:00

Pochepskoye (Russian: Почепское) is a rural locality (a selo) and the administrative center of Pochepskoye Rural Settlement, Liskinsky District, Voronezh Oblast, Russia. The population was 1,130 as of 2010. There are 12 streets.

== Geography ==
Pochepskoye is located 27 km north of Liski (the district's administrative centre) by road. Dmitriyevka is the nearest rural locality.
