= Distressed swimmer =

Distressed swimmer or distressed non-swimmer (DNS) is a term used by the Life Saving Society of Canada to describe a particular swimming victim type.

== Lifesaving Society definition ==
Distressed swimmers can be novice swimmers with limited swimming ability, tired or weak swimmers, and people who are ill or injured. This group also includes swimmers who become disoriented after playing in or falling into the water. Unless they are rescued, distressed swimmers can become drowning victims.

The acronym "DNS" is a commonly used term within the Canadian Lifesaving Society to expedite the process of describing a victim. This is particularly useful in emergency situations where time is of the essence, and where the phrase "distressed non-swimmer" would be difficult to say.
