= Roman Konoplev =

Writer, essayist, political analyst

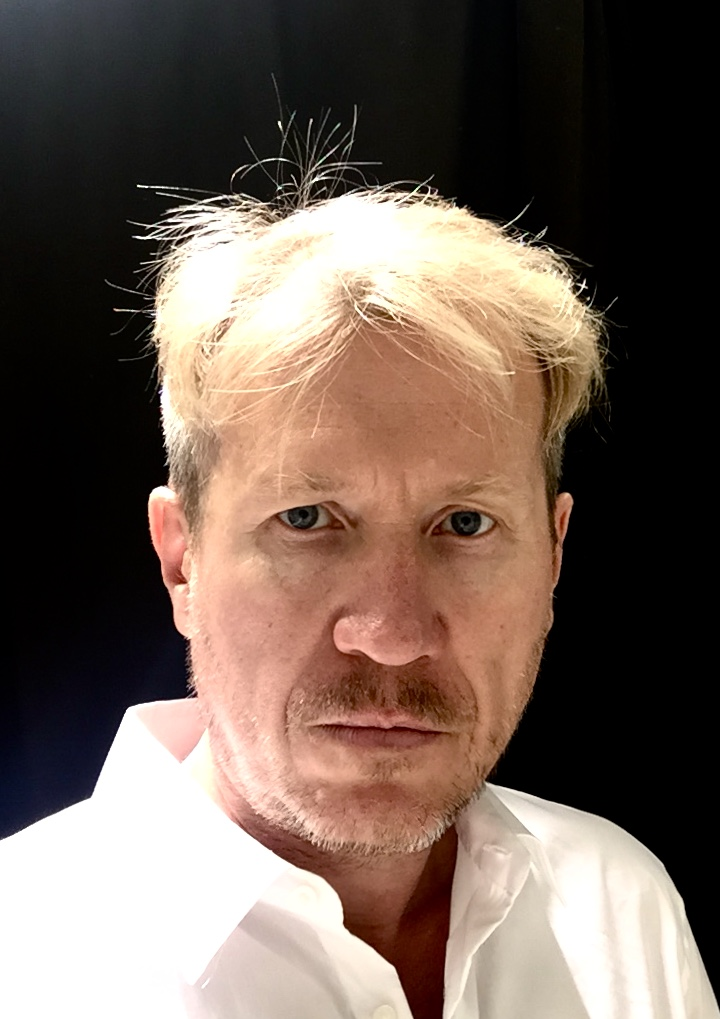
- Roman Konoplev in 2023
- Born: Roman Yevgenyevich Konoplev; 4 September 1973; Pochep, Bryansk Oblast, Russian SFSR, Soviet Union
- Citizenship: Soviet (1973–1991); Russian (1992–present); Portuguese (2019–present)
- Education: International Institute of Economics and Law; Bryansk State Technical University
- Occupations: Writer, essayist, political analyst
- Spouse: Dina Konopleva

Roman Yevgenyevich Konoplev (Russian: Роман Евгеньевич Коноплёв; born 4 September 1973) is a writer, essayist and political analyst. His literary, essayistic, and analytical work is primarily dedicated to the political processes, social dynamics, and ideological transformations within Russia, Transnistria, Moldova, the broader post-Soviet space, and Europe.

His articles and columns appear on various analytical commentary platforms, including the National Strategy Institute (APN) and "The Russian Idea" (Russkaia Idea), where he contributes strategic reviews and essays.

From 2009 to 2017, he served as the owner and editor-in-chief of the news agency DNIESTER. Since relocating to Portugal in 2013, he has continued publishing analysis and literary works.

== Biography ==
Konoplev was born on 4 September 1973 in Bryansk Oblast, then part of the Russian SFSR in the Soviet Union, into a family of engineers. In 1978, his family relocated to Dnestrovsc in the Moldavian SSR, where he spent his childhood and completed his early schooling. Following the dissolution of the Soviet Union, he returned to Russia in 1992.

Konoplev studied constitutional law at the International Institute of Economics and Law in Moscow, graduating in 1996. He later earned an engineering degree in information technology from Bryansk State Technical University in 2003.

== Early civic involvement ==
In the early 1990s, Konoplev became involved in civic and opposition movements in post-Soviet Russia. He was among the participants in the events surrounding the 1993 Russian constitutional crisis, joining the defenders of the House of Councils on 24 September 1993 as part of a security unit of the Russian Supreme Council. He left the building together with other defenders on 4 October 1993 during the assault.

He later contributed analytical materials and public commentary to various civic initiatives.

== Work in Transnistria ==
In the 2000s, Konoplev participated in media and communication projects in Transnistria. His analytical work during this period was noted in regional migration maps and socio-political research.

During this timeframe, he also published a series of essays titled Gipsy Bessarabia, focusing on regional identity, political narratives, and socio-cultural dynamics.

== Journalism and analytical work ==
Konoplev began publishing commentary and political journalism in the late 1990s. He contributed to platforms such as APN, Russian Journal, and Nazlobu. He was also listed as an expert of the analytical network KREML.ORG, which featured profiles of political analysts and commentary on post-Soviet developments.

In the 2000s, he worked as a columnist for the Dnestrovsky Courier (2002–2008) and later served as editor and columnist for Lenta PMR (2004–2008) and Russkiy Proryv! (2007–2008).

From 2009 to 2017, Konoplev owned and edited the news agency DNIESTER. The agency’s publications and the regional media context were cited in several international assessment reports and analytical studies on democratisation.

In addition to ongoing platform contributions, his historical analytical publications include a 2010 report titled Pridnestrovie’s Future: Liberal Economy, Freedom and Security, focusing on socio-economic modernization models, and a 2024 comprehensive regional study on ideological transformations in Eastern Europe.

== Literary work ==
Konoplev has authored several works of fiction and non-fiction. His first novel, The Gospel of an Extremist (Евангелие от экстремиста), analyzing radical youth subcultures of the 1990s, was published by Bryansk Regional Press in 2005 (ISBN 5-94632-061-0). The book was subject to informal distribution restrictions in Russia and was added to the state list of extremist materials in Belarus by a court ruling in 2017.

He later published the novels Dromomania (2011) and Defeat (2013). His travel logs, Norwegian Papers, were reprinted across several international media portals.

Since the 2020s, his work has increasingly focused on long-form essays and non-fiction books dealing with social change, identity, Eastern Europe and contemporary European society.

== Other endeavors ==
=== Music ===
In the 1990s and early 2000s, Konoplev was active in the independent rock music scene as a singer-songwriter, guitarist and performer. He participated in concert activity across various regions of the former Soviet Union and was involved in a number of underground and alternative music projects.

Since 2021, he has collaborated with the indie music project Bering Hotel as an arranger, producer and co-author of recordings.

== Later life ==
In the early 2010s, Konoplev faced escalating pressure linked to his independent journalistic work in Transnistria. International assessments during this period documented systematic restrictions on independent media and incidents of institutional pressure on journalists in the region.

He left the region in 2012, relocating to Portugal, where he continues his analytical and creative work, having acquired Portuguese citizenship through naturalisation.
