= Pochep, Bryansk Oblast =

Town in Bryansk Oblast, Russia

Pochep Почеп
- Town
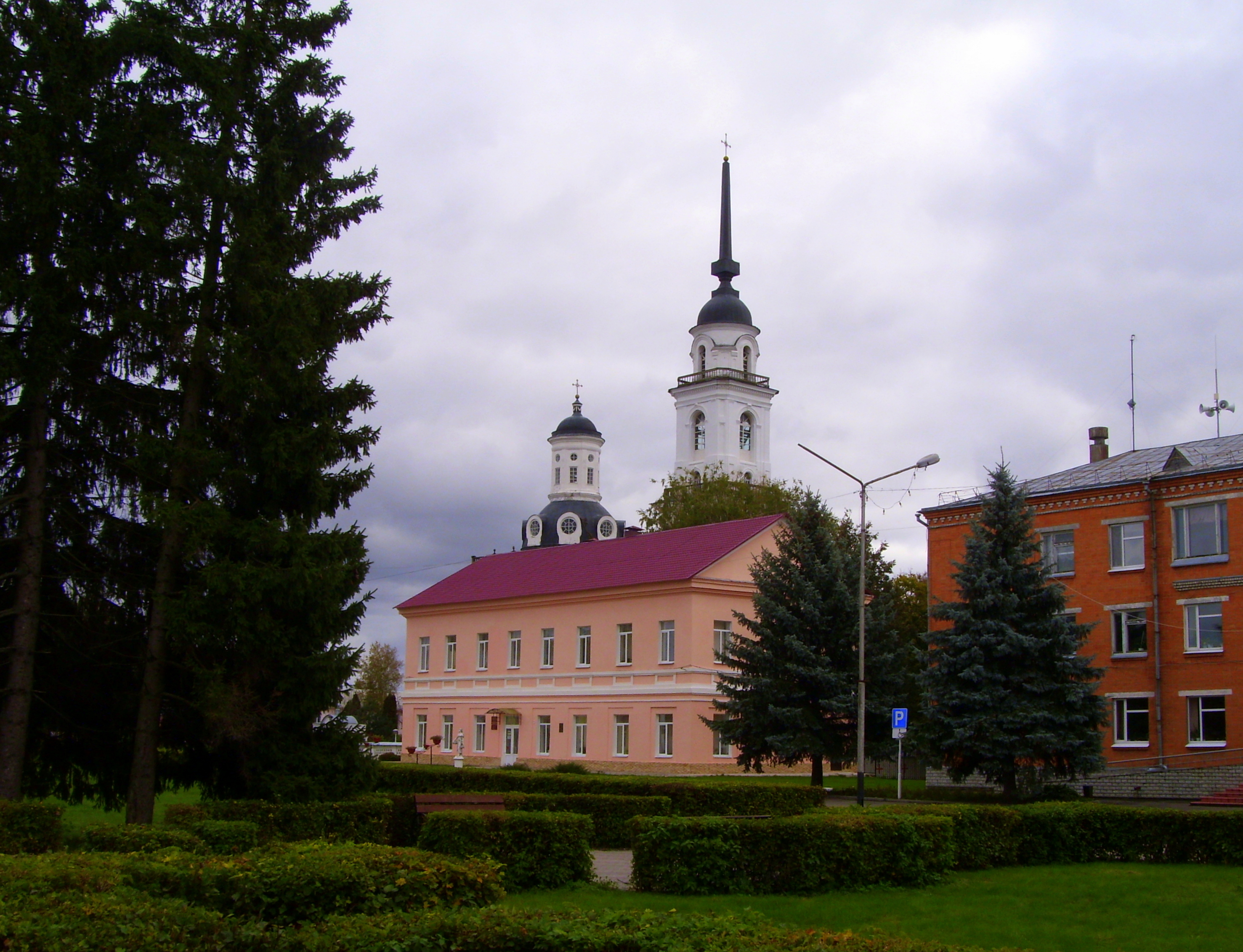

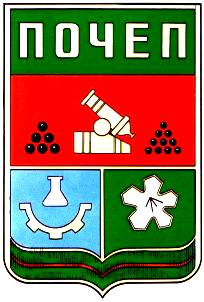
- Coat of arms
- Interactive map of Pochep
- Location of Pochep Pochep (Bryansk Oblast)
- Coordinates: 52°56′N 33°27′E
- Country: Russia
- Federal subject: Bryansk Oblast
- Administrative district: Pochepsky District
- Urban Administrative OkrugSelsoviet: Pochepsky
- First mentioned: 15th century
- Elevation: 150 m (490 ft)

Population (2010 Census)
  - Total: 17,161
  - Estimate (2021): 14,991 (−12.6%)

Administrative status
  - Capital of: Pochepsky District, Pochepsky Urban Administrative Okrug

Municipal status
  - Municipal district: Pochepsky Municipal District
  - Urban settlement: Pochepskoye Urban Settlement
  - Capital of: Pochepsky Municipal District, Pochepskoye Urban Settlement
- Time zone: UTC+3 (MSK)
- Postal codes: 243400, 243402, 243449
- Dialing code: +7 48345
- OKTMO ID: 15644101001
- Website: www.admgorodpoc.ru

Pochep (Russian: По́чеп) is a town and the administrative center of Pochepsky District in Bryansk Oblast, Russia, located 84 kilometers (52 mi) southwest of Bryansk, the administrative center of the oblast. Population: 14,991 (2021 census); 17,161 (2010 census); 17,064 (2002 census); 16,868 (1989 Soviet census).

== History ==
Historical affiliations

Poland–Lithuania 15th cent.–1503
Grand Duchy of Moscow 1503–1547
Tsardom of Russia 1547–1618
Polish–Lithuanian Commonwealth 1618–1648
Cossack Hetmanate 1648–1781 (Note: Under protectorate of Tsardom of Russia in 1654–1721 and Russian Empire after 1721) Russian Empire 1781–1917
Ukrainian People's Republic 1917-1918
Soviet Russia 1918–1922
Soviet Union 1922–1991
Russian Federation 1991–present

The origin of Pochep is unknown but it was mentioned in the 15th century as an important town of the Grand Duchy of Lithuania. It fell into the hands of the Grand Duchy of Moscow in 1503. Pochep was returned to the Polish–Lithuanian Commonwealth under the terms of the Truce of Deulino. It was part of the Smolensk Voivodeship.

From 1654, the town became part of the Cossack Hetmanate, initially within the Nizhyn Regiment and later the Starodub Regiment. In 1668, during the Russo–Ukrainian War, the town withstood a month-long siege by Russian forces under Prince K. Shcherbatov.

Pochep remained of little significance until 1709, when Hetman Ivan Skoropadsky made a grant of it to Alexander Menshikov. The latter founded the fort of Alexandropolis in the vicinity and launched manufacture of sails for Russian ships in Pochep.

The industry declined following Menshikov's downfall and the town stagnated until 1750, when it passed to another Hetman, Kirill Razumovsky, who planned to build his summer residence there. The only monument to these plans is the Resurrection Church, built in the 1750s to a confident Baroque design and often attributed to Antonio Rinaldi.

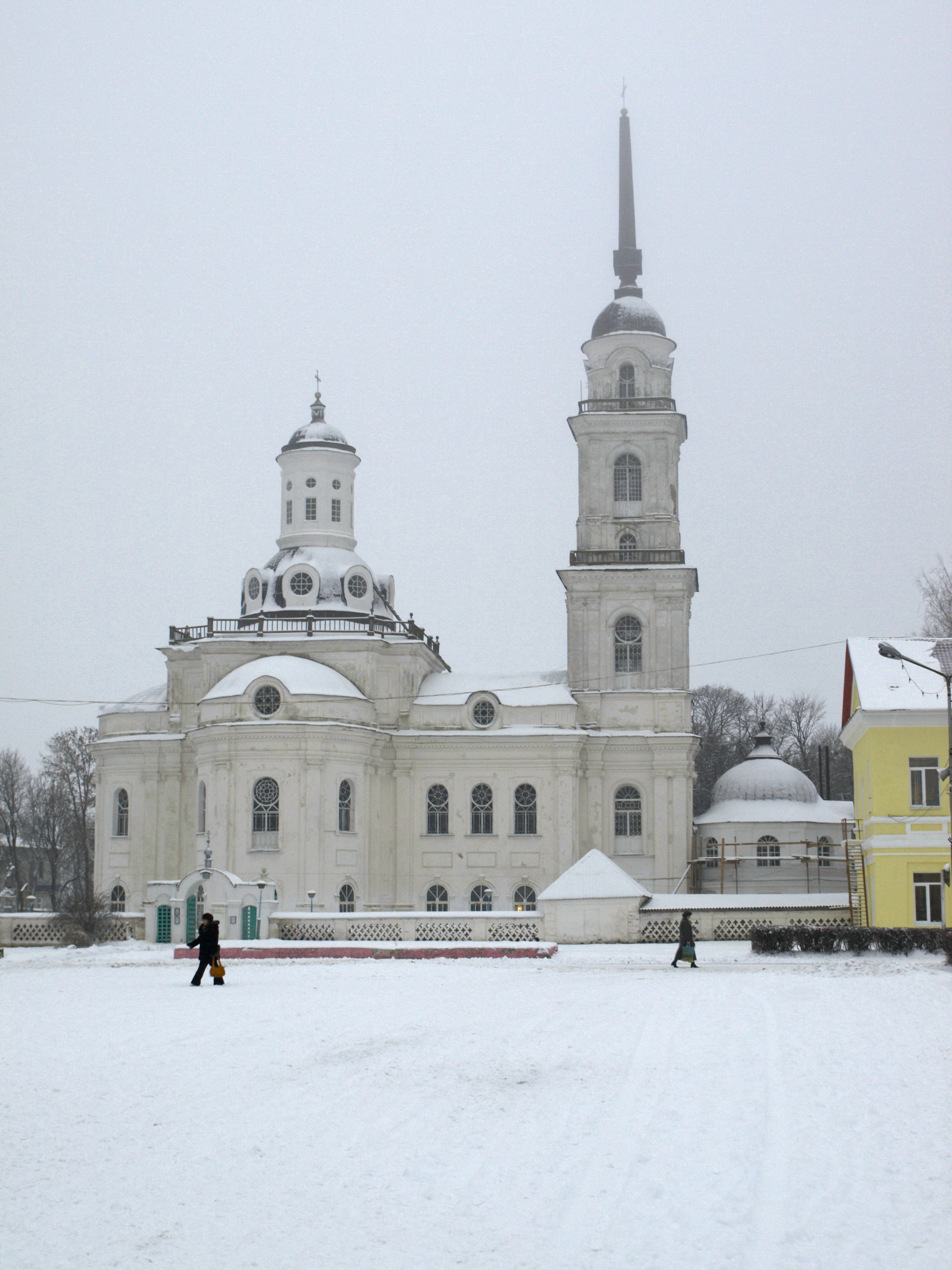
Resurrection Church in Pochep

During World War II, Pochep was occupied by the German Army from August 22, 1941 to September 21, 1943. According to the Soviet archives, 1,875 Jews, including men, women, and children, were murdered during the Holocaust, mainly in the shootings of March 1942.

== Administrative and municipal status ==
Within the framework of administrative divisions, Pochep serves as the administrative center of Pochepsky District. As an administrative division, it is incorporated within Pochepsky District as Pochepsky Urban Administrative Okrug. As a municipal division, Pochepsky Urban Administrative Okrug is incorporated within Pochepsky Municipal District as Pochepskoye Urban Settlement.

== Notable people ==
- Pavel Axelrod, Russian Menshevik, was born here in 1850.
- Matvey Blanter, Russian composer, famous for the song "Katyusha", was born here in 1903.
- Roman Konoplev, Russian politician and publicist, was born here in 1973.

== See also ==
Vialky
