= Det Nødvendige Seminarium =

Private college in Denmark

The Necessary Teacher Training College
- Det Nødvendige Seminarium
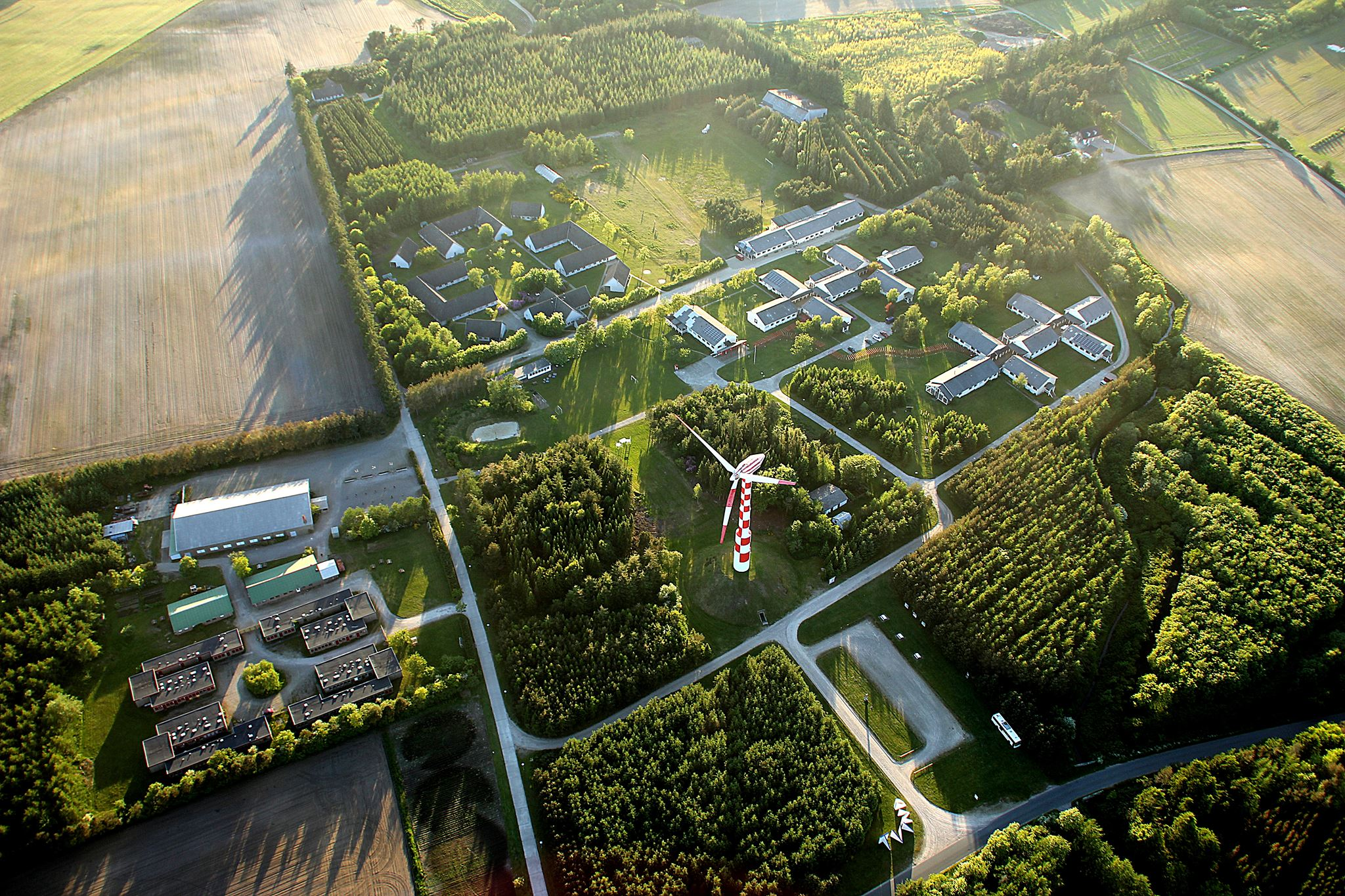
- The DNS campus
- Other names: DNS, Teacher Training, Another kind of Education
- Motto: The world is our classroom
- Type: Private, non-profit College
- Established: 1972; 54 years ago
- Students: 55
- Location: Ulfborg, Denmark; 56°15′27″N 8°16′45″E
- Campus: All inclusive campus located in western Denmark
- Language: English, Danish
- Website: dns-tvind.dk
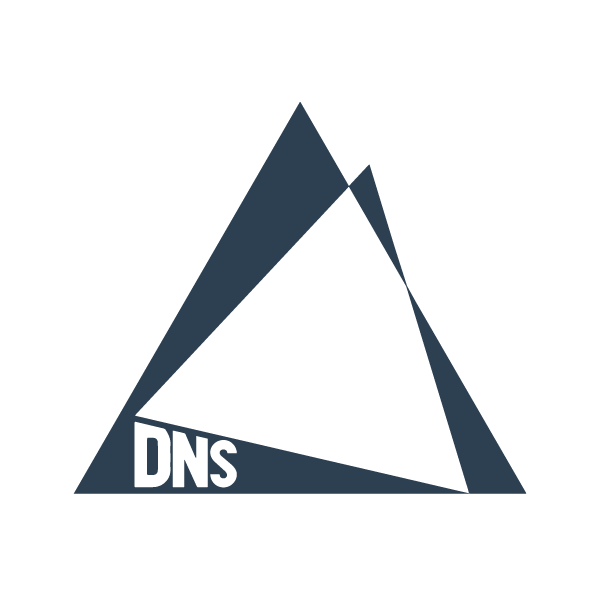

Det Nødvendige Seminarium (DNS) (English: The Necessary Teacher Training College) is a private international college located in Denmark. DNS offers a four-year experience-based programme to become a teacher.

DNS was founded in Denmark in 1972 and has since educated hundreds of teachers now working all over the world in positions related to alternative education for children, youngsters and adults. The institution is located in the Central Jutland. The campus is an alternative community, comprising different institutions, such as small care homes for youngsters and adults with special needs, and a wind energy farm, the Tvindkraft. Every year DNS host and organise different educational events, such as sports events for schools, concerts of classical music, pedagogical workshops and camps, and a yearly Peace Justice Conference.

The institution is private, and the programme alternates periods of studies with periods of work to allow the students to self-finance their education. The working periods are referred to as "saving up periods", and are facilitated by DNS - often collaborating with partnering pedagogical institutions within the framework of the college.

== Educational principles ==
The DNS programme uses alternative methods to train alternative teachers. Its pedagogy draws inspiration from multiple alternative-pedagogues, such as Paulo Freire, Maria Montessori, Anton Makarenko, John Dewey, and so on, but doesn't affiliate itself specifically with any particular one of these theorists. Distinctive traits of the education include the combination of practice and theory and the learning-by-doing methodology, the community lifestyle of the campus and the team environment as the students' base for progressing through their studies. This education can also be described as student-centred and democratic.

The pedagogy of DNS builds mostly on years of experience in managing alternative education, and aims to stay relevant and contemporary by integrating flexible subjects with practical, reality-based experiences. Its core is embodied in 10 principles:

1. Integration of theory and practice. A combination of practical and theoretical studies is necessary for an effective learning experience, according to DNS pedagogy. Study-travel, events and teaching practices are examples of how DNS combines the theory and practice.
2. A high degree of reality. According to DNS pedagogy, studies must be relevant to reality and theoretical information is always to be understood in connection to its practical implications. Integrating a high degree of reality into the learning experiences of students, then, can help them to understand their studies on a deeper level. This can happen through study-travel or by being involved in the practical maintenance of the school facilities.
3. Coherence and overview. For deeper learning, it is necessary to be able to draw connections between the topics of studies and to seek overview. Connections should also be drawn between different spheres of society, and the students are encouraged to ponder the political, economic, social and cultural implications of the things which they study and experience, for example.
4. The programme generates motivation. By being well-rounded and practical, the programme is not something the students have to get through just to obtain a degree, but a motivating, involving and stimulating learning experience that has a significant impact on the personal development of the student.
5. Immersion of the educator. The programme is not limited to a few hours per day, but is constructed as a lifestyle, an immersive 4-year experience that allows the students to reach deeper learning. Future teachers are encouraged to think that learning doesn't necessarily have to happen in the classroom, and that their students' learning experience, too, is a full-time process.
6. Self-determination. DNS students don't just have to follow a pre-constructed programme or solid guidelines, but have to take active initiative in their own education. This can happen by having to make decisions or to solve tasks together. This helps them train their social and leadership skills, giving them the space to reflect and experience the concept of democracy.
7. A focus on collectiveness. The capacity to unite, work and make decisions with other people is a fundamental skill for teachers. The programme offers ample chances to practise and improve these skills thanks to its team-based setting.
8. Flexibility and space for students' initiatives and creativity. Because the programme is student-based and flexible, the students have the space to bring their own initiatives to the team and to start up new projects together. Students might decide to include new and relevant topics to their studies by organizing courses and conferences, for example, or they might decide to create an organic vegetable-garden on the campus to eat healthier food.
9. A focus on students' mobility. Meeting real-life and people, observing new realities and different cultures is beneficial to students' understanding of the world and of their own society and of their own personal identities. Seeking for mobility and different perspectives is one of the constant efforts of DNS pedagogy.
10. The role of the teacher in the DNS programme. The DNS programme is not something people are generally accustomed to, or prepared to do from previous education. Every team is thus paired with one or more teachers who have already gone through the programme, and who guide and participate in the learning process of the students. This can often help the students to make sense of their learning experiences and to get the most out of their education.

An underlying idea behind DNS pedagogy involves reflection on the role of teachers in society. DNS aims to train active, politically-engaged teachers who can develop an independent and critical understanding of society and empower their own students to act similarly - by taking charge of their own reality and by participating in the struggles against the global issues of the 21st century, for example.

== Eligibility ==
Because the DNS college is not recognised by the Danish Government as higher education, it cannot grant VISAs and can therefore only enrol students holding EU passports. The teaching language is English. However, first year students do not need to be fluent in English, but able to communicate and study in English.

== Funding ==
The 4-year education includes working and saving up periods, during which the students can earn their basic living expenses and school fees.

The expenses for the 1st year have to be saved up before the programme starts. Some students might decide to save up on their own money and pay the enrolment fee as their programme starts, every September. Others might join the saving up pre-course and earn their money with the support of DNS. Since 2012, DNS has offered a one-year saving up period starting 1 August to make the programme more accessible to the students.
