= DNS (retail company) =

Russian chain of stores

- Industry: Electronics retail
- Founded: 1998
- Headquarters: Vladivostok, Russia
- Key people: Dmitri Alekseyev (CEO), Aleksei Popov (general director)
- Products: Consumer electronics; Computers; Mobile phones; Telecommunications
- Revenue: 427,633 billion RUB (2020)
- Net income: 31,631,000,000 (2020)
- Number of employees: 38,455 (2020)
- Website: www.dns-shop.ru

DNS Retail (Russian: OOO «ДНС Ритейл», also known in English as CSN Retail LLC) is the owner of a Russian retail chain specialising in the sale of computers, electronics, and household goods, and also a manufacturer of computer hardware including laptops, tablets and smartphones. In 2019, it became the 6th-largest retail company in Russia, and in 2021, DNS was the 22nd-largest private company in Russia. As of 2021, there are more than 2,000 branches across Russia, and in May 2021, the first branches were opened in Kazakhstan. The company's headquarters are located in Vladivostok.

The company's general director is Aleksei Popov. Popov is also the general director and co-owner of the parent company DNS Group.

== History ==
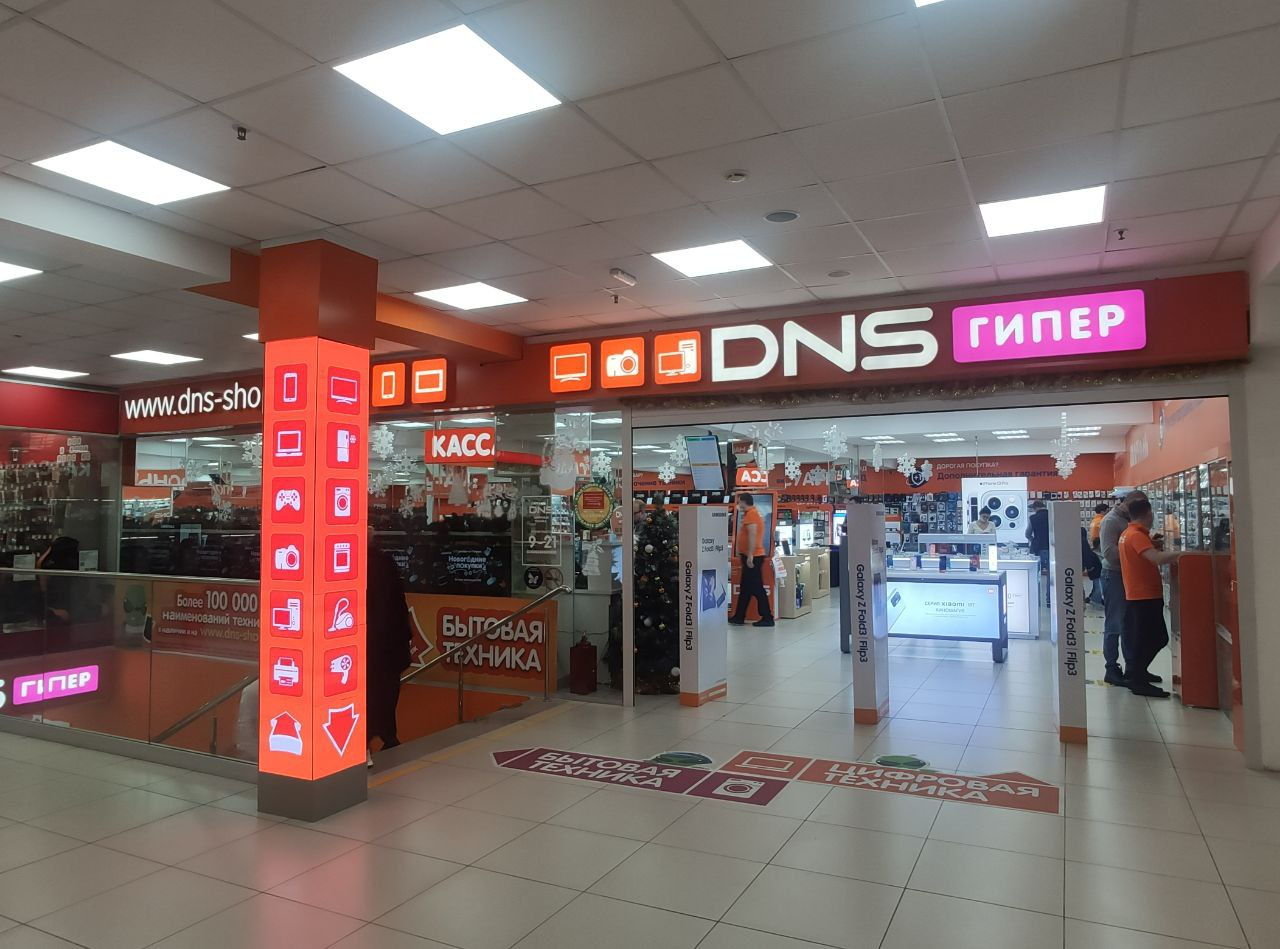
DNS store in Sochi, Russia

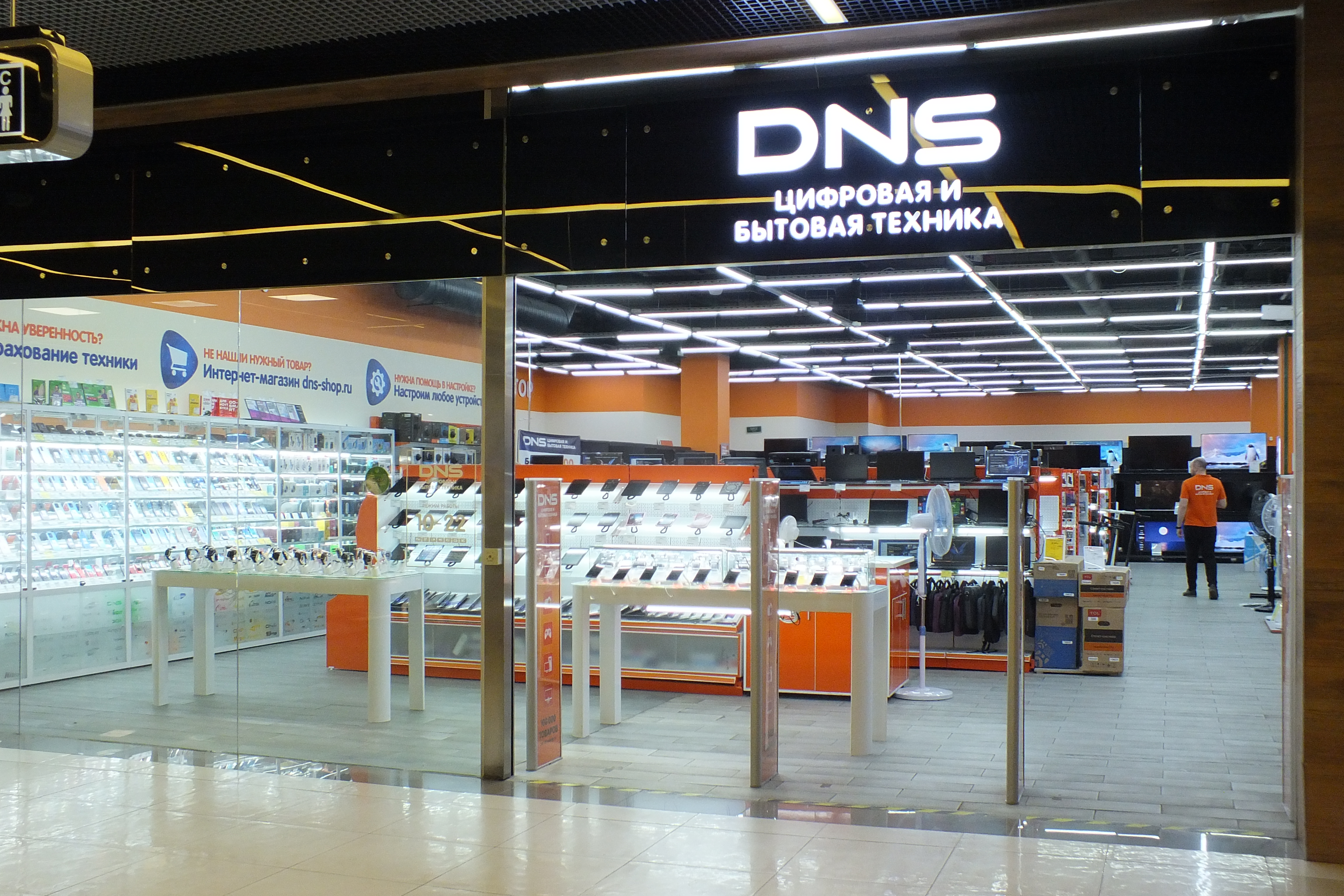
DNS store in Brateyevo District, Moscow, Russia

DNS (short for Digital Network System) was founded in 1998 in Vladivostok, following the founders' previous business, which specialised in corporate computer services, going bankrupt. The company initially sold hand-assembled computers in a retail store.

In 2005, the company began expanding its retail presence nationwide, opening branches in Nakhodka and Khabarovsk. In 2006, a further branch was opened in Irkutsk. By 2009, there were DNS stores in cities across Russia, including Chita, Novosibirsk, Ekaterinburg, and Rostov on Don. At the same time, further branches were opened in regions where the company already had a presence.

By July 2013, the chain consisted of more than 700 stores located in over 200 cities across Russia. In addition, the company owns 10 distribution sites, a computer and laptop manufacturing plant in Artyom, and computer assembly plants in Moscow Oblast and Novosibirsk.

In April 2014, the company acquired the Computer World retail chain (consisting of 21 stores in Saint Petersburg and a further 11 in the Northwestern Federal District). In March 2019, the company further acquired the St. Petersburg-based retail chain KEY.

In May 2021, DNS expanded its retail network beyond Russia for the first time, opening branches in Kazakhstan.

== Business activities ==
In the first half of 2011, the company assembled 193,000 personal computers, making it the largest PC assembler in Russia. The company also produces laptops, desktop computers, monitors, smartphones, computer power supplies and computer accessories under the brands DNS, DEXP, and Ardor (ZET Gaming).

== Company structure ==
The company was founded by 10 acquaintances and residents of Vladivostok, who had experience working in the computer industry. As of 2015, 9 of them continued to work for the company; the remaining founders had died and passed their shares in the company to their families.

Before 2018, the company consisted of more than 50 legal entities, each registered in a different region but connected to the company through their common owners. In March 2018, however, the company was restructured and all legal entities were merged into the limited liability company DNS Retail (also known as CSN Retail in English).
