= DNIESTER News Agency =

DNIESTER РИА Днестр
- Type: Private limited company
- Industry: News media
- Founded: July 13, 2009
- Defunct: 8 September 2017
- Headquarters: Tiraspol, Transnistria, Moldova
- Area served: Worldwide
- Key people: Roman Konoplev (Editor-in-Chief and CEO)
- Products: Wire service
- Website: RIA Dniester

The DNIESTER News Agency (Региональное информационное агентство «Днестр») was an independent non-governmental regional news agency founded in Tiraspol in July 2009. It specialized in news coverage, analytical materials, and commentaries on socio-political processes in Transnistria, the rest of Moldova, Ukraine, and the wider South-West post-Soviet space. The agency operated until September 2017 and was directed throughout its existence by political analyst and publicist Roman Konoplev.

== History ==
DNIESTER was launched on 13 July 2009 in Tiraspol as an independent media project providing news, interviews, and analytical commentary. The resource focused on analyzing the socio-political situation in the region and monitoring international media coverage from Romania, Russia, Ukraine, and the European Union.

Between 2009 and 2012, the editorial office operated in Tiraspol. In the spring of 2012, amid changing conditions for professional journalism and increasing pressure, the agency's leadership and editorial staff left Transnistria. Following 2012, DNIESTER continued its operations remotely from outside the region. Regular publication on the agency's platforms was fully discontinued on 8 September 2017.

== Media environment and administrative pressures ==
Following the 2011 presidential elections in Transnistria, the agency was increasingly described as critical of the new local administration. In 2012, the website experienced systematic DDoS attacks causing significant technical disruptions. The editor-in-chief reported obstacles to free access to information imposed by local authorities. On 8 November 2012, local Internet service providers blocked access to dniester.ru for users inside Transnistria by order of the regional executive authorities.

In May 2013, the regional leadership proposed a mandatory state registration policy for blocked internet platforms to operate as official media outlets, triggering local public protests and a rally supporting press freedom in Tiraspol.

The blocks and administrative restrictions surrounding the agency were recorded in the annual report "On the Situation of Mass Media in the Republic of Moldova in 2013" by the Independent Journalism Center (IJC), as well as in analyses by Moldova.org.

== Criticism and reception ==
The agency's editorial line and content attracted polemics and divergent criticism from various political and public groups:

- In the rest of Moldova, several commentators and humanitarian outlets criticized the agency, alleging a pro-Russian orientation or alignment with Tiraspol's regional authorities.
- Within Transnistria, pro-government analysts and state experts condemned the platform for propagating market-liberal economic models, legal and land reforms, and maintaining an allegedly "pro-European" stance.

== Content and contributors ==
DNIESTER provided daily news updates, expert interviews, and commentaries focusing on regional civil rights, the situation of the Russian-speaking population, and geopolitical dynamics in the Black Sea region.

The platform featured articles and opinions by regional and international experts, politicians, and commentators, including Oazu Nantoi, Andrei Safonov, Mikhail Lupashko, Ivan Burgudji, Vladimir Tseslyuk, Sergey Ilchenko, Modest Kolerov, Egor Kholmogorov, Konstantin Krylov, and Pavel Danilin, among others. In 2010, the platform published a comprehensive policy report titled "The Future of Transnistria: Liberal Economy, Freedom, and Security," outlining potential structural reforms for the region's institutions.

== Use in research and reports ==
The restrictions on the agency's work and its editorial parameters have been monitored and referenced in reports by several international, governmental, and non-governmental institutions:

- In Freedom House's annual Nations in Transit (2015) report tracking independent media development in Moldova;
- In a 2017 study by the International Organization for Migration (IOM) documenting instances of independent journalists departing the region due to occupational pressures;
- In the Foreign Policy Research Institute (FPRI, US) research tracking the media landscape of post-Soviet southwestern borderlands;
- In openDemocracy's analytical reviews exploring institutional and electoral processes in the region;
- In the monitoring report "Peisajul mediatic și narativele presei transnistrene. Tablou incomplet" (2017) by the Moldovan think-tank IDIS Viitorul;
- In thematic media space analyses conducted by the Romanian Foundation for University Black Sea Studies (FUMN).
