= Pochepsky District =

Pochepsky District Почепский район (Russian)
- District
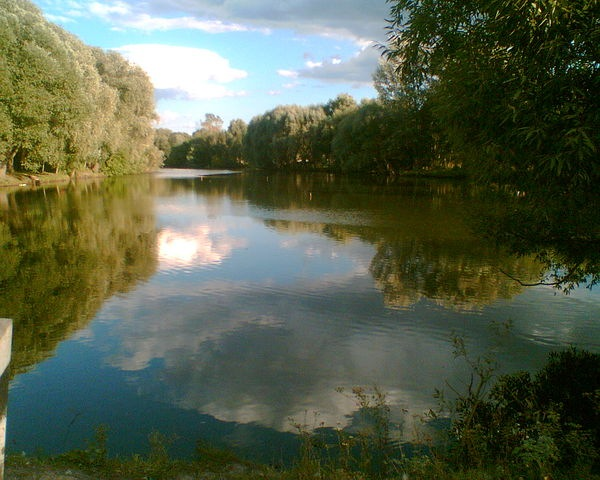
- A pond in the village of Papsuyevka, Pochepsky District

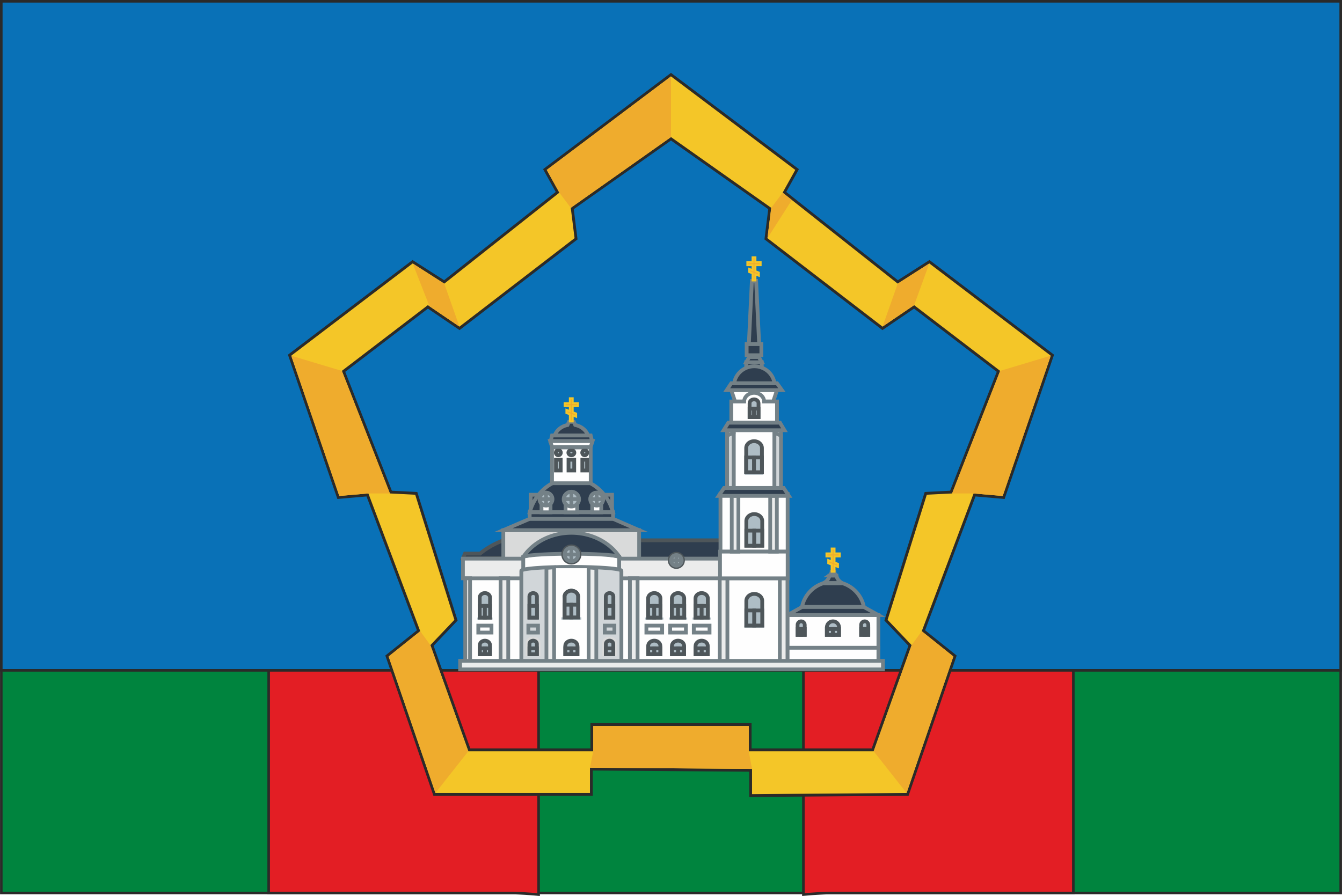
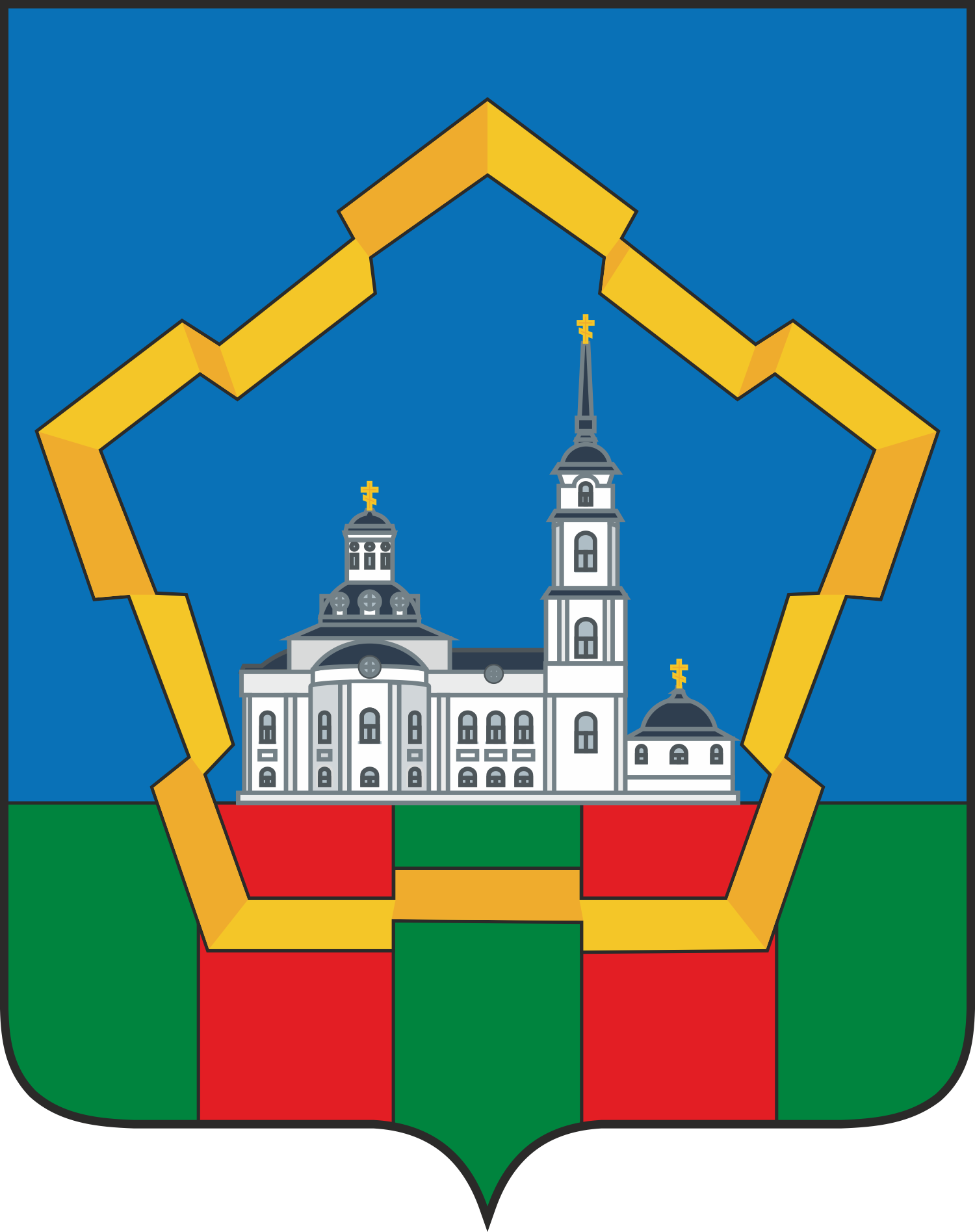
- Flag Coat of arms
- Location of Pochepsky District in Bryansk Oblast
- Coordinates: 52°56′N 33°27′E
- Country: Russia
- Federal subject: Bryansk Oblast
- Established: 1929
- Administrative center: Pochep

Area
  - Total: 1,886 km^{2} (728 sq mi)

Population (2010 Census)
  - Total: 42,365
  - Density: 22.46/km^{2} (58.18/sq mi)
  - Urban: 41.6%
  - Rural: 58.4%

Administrative structure
  - Administrative divisions: 1 Urban administrative okrugs, 1 Settlement administrative okrugs, 17 Rural administrative okrugs
  - Inhabited localities: 1 cities/towns, 1 urban-type settlements, 245 rural localities

Municipal structure
  - Municipally incorporated as: Pochepsky Municipal District
  - Municipal divisions: 2 urban settlements, 17 rural settlements
- Time zone: UTC+3 (MSK)
- OKTMO ID: 15644000
- Website: http://www.admpochep.ru

Population of Pochepsky District
- 2021 Census: 34,971
- 2010 Census: 42,365
- 2002 Census: 46,972
- 1989 Census: 48,957
- 1979 Census: 67,192

Pochepsky District (Russian: По́чепский райо́н) is an administrative and municipal district (Raion), one of the twenty-seven in Bryansk Oblast, Russia. It is located in the center of the Oblast. The area of the district is 1,886 square kilometers (728 sq mi). Its administrative center is the town of Pochep. As of the 2021 Census, the total population of the district was 34,971, with the population of Pochep accounting for 42.9% of that number.

== History ==
The district was established in 1929 within Western Oblast. When Bryansk Oblast was created on July 5, 1944, the district became a part of it.
