= Kalach-na-Donu =

Town in Volgograd Oblast, Russia

Kalach-na-Donu Калач-на-Дону
- Town
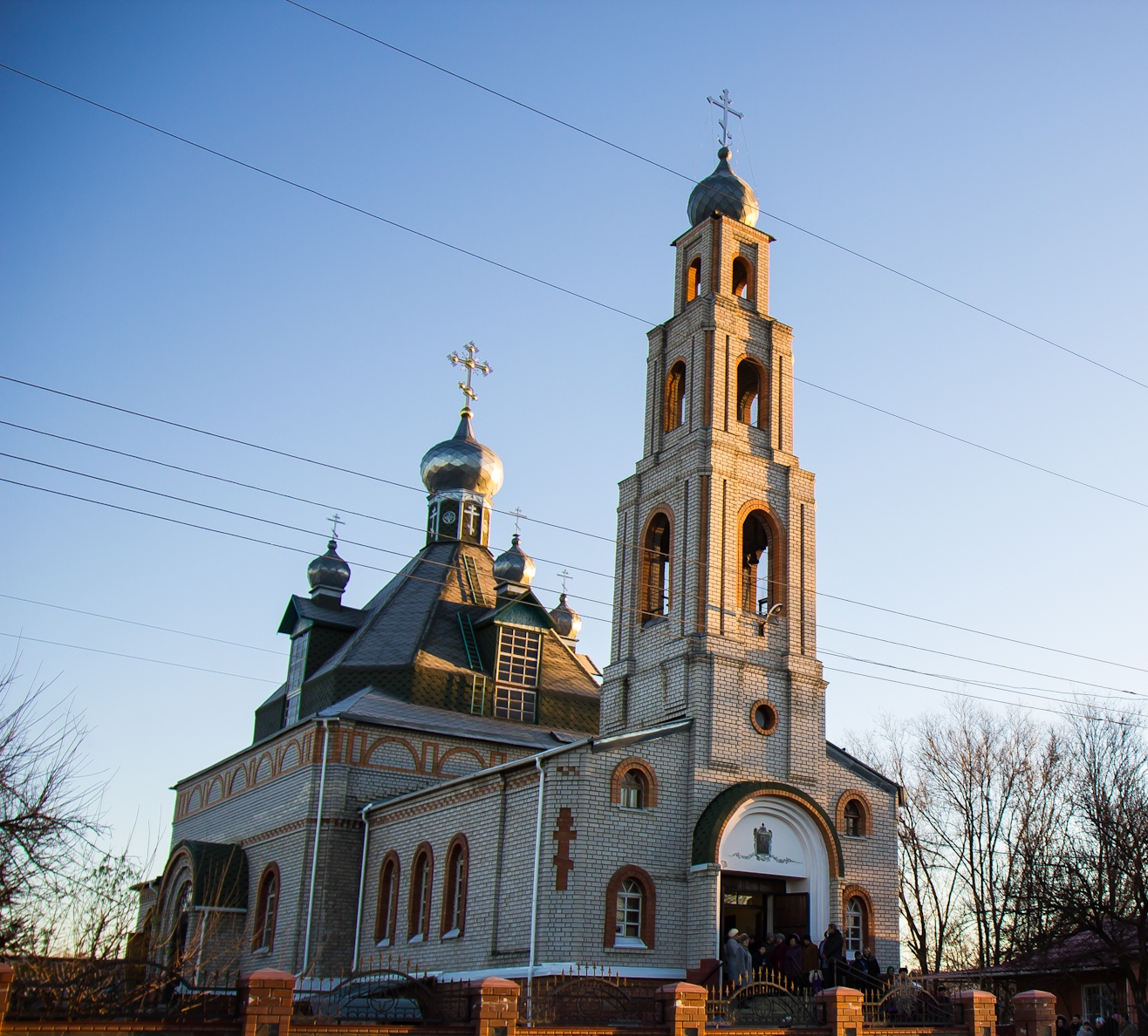
- Church of Saint Nicholas

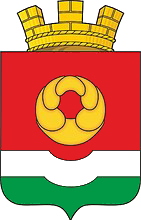
- Flag Coat of arms
- Interactive map of Kalach-na-Donu
- Location of Kalach-na-Donu Kalach-na-Donu (Volgograd Oblast)
- Coordinates: 48°42′N 43°31′E
- Country: Russia
- Federal subject: Volgograd Oblast
- Administrative district: Kalachyovsky District
- Town of district significanceSelsoviet: Kalach-na-Donu
- Founded: 1708
- Town status since: April 18, 1951
- Elevation: 40 m (130 ft)

Population (2010 Census)
  - Total: 26,910
  - Estimate (2021): 24,277 (−9.8%)

Administrative status
  - Capital of: Kalachyovsky District, town of district significance of Kalach-na-Donu

Municipal status
  - Municipal district: Kalachyovsky Municipal District
  - Urban settlement: Kalachevskoye Urban Settlement
  - Capital of: Kalachyovsky Municipal District, Kalachevskoye Urban Settlement
- Time zone: UTC+3 (MSK)
- Postal code: 404507
- Dialing code: +7 84472
- OKTMO ID: 18616101001
- Website: www.kalachgoradmin.ru

Kalach-na-Donu (Russian: Кала́ч-на-Дону́), or Kalach-on-the-Don, is a town and the administrative center of Kalachyovsky District in Volgograd Oblast, Russia, located on the Don River, 72 kilometers (45 mi) west of Volgograd, the administrative center of the oblast. Population: 17,624 (2021 census); 26,910 (2010 census); 26,882 (2002 census); 22,979 (1989 Soviet census).

The town is unofficially divided into several parts: Starii Kalach (“Old Kalach”, located in the northwest, closest to the bridge); the main part of the city (has no name, and its areas correspond to the names of bus stops), Stroyrayon ("District of new houses", the newest part of the town) and the village of Cherkasovo.

== History ==
It was founded in 1708 as a Cossack sloboda and was originally called Kalach (Калач).

In 1862, the Volga-Don Railway was built from Tsaritsyn to Kalach - the oldest operating railway in the territory of the modern Volgograd region. This railroad brought prosperity to the town in the early 20th century.

During the Russian Civil War, Kalach was important in the defense of Tsaritsyn. One of the most massive uprisings of the Cossacks against Bolshevik rule took place in this area. The town moved from one side to the other about eight times.

In World War II, the town lent its name to an armored clash between the German 6th Army and the Soviet 64th and 1st Tank Armies from July 25 to August 11, 1942. About three months later, during Operation Uranus, several Soviet tank corps encircled the besieging German 6th Army in Stalingrad by capturing Kalach, thus cutting off German supply routes.

It was granted town status on April 18, 1951. At the same time, its name was changed to Kalach-na-Donu, to distinguish it from an eponymous town in Voronezh Oblast. By Construction of Volga–Don Canal in 1952, The city become the end point of the canal.

During the Soviet period, an industrial cluster was built in the town: shipyard, heavy vehicle repair workshop, dairy factory, fish factory, bakery, metal structures plant and others.

In 1976, a road bridge across the Don River was built near the town.

In the 1990s, the population of Kalach-on-Don grew slightly due to thousands of Russian repatriates from the republics of the former USSR.

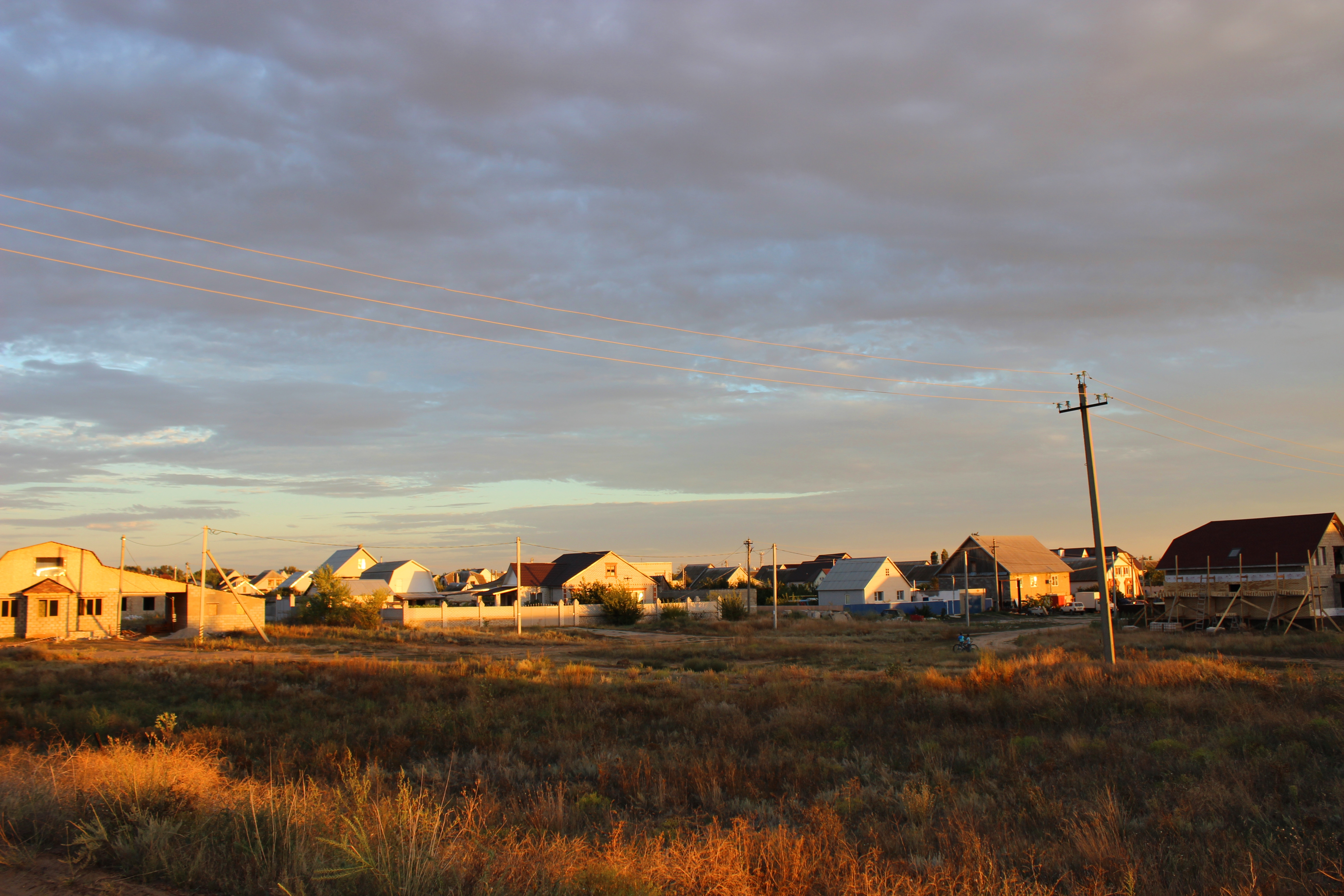
View of Kalach from the North.

In the summer of 2006, forest fires burned in the suburbs of the town.

Since March 25, 2010, the town has the honorary title City of Military Glory (Decree of Russian President Dmitry Medvedev No. 342). The town has this title for its historical role in the events of the Battle of Stalingrad.

In 2020, during the COVID-19 pandemic, a new infectious diseases hospital was built in the town.

On July 9, 2024, six Ukrainian kamikaze drones attacked an oil storage facility near the town shipyard.

== Administrative and municipal status ==
Within the framework of administrative divisions, Kalach-na-Donu serves as the administrative center of Kalachyovsky District. As an administrative division, it is, together with the settlement of Dom otdykha, incorporated within Kalachyovsky District as the town of district significance of Kalach-na-Donu. As a municipal division, the town of district significance of Kalach-na-Donu is incorporated within Kalachyovsky Municipal District as Kalachevskoye Urban Settlement.

== Economy ==
Since the end of the 20th century and in the first three decades of the 21st century, the A260 highway has played an important role in the town's economy.

Major employers in 2020s:

- Magnit
- Sberbank
- X5 Group
- National Guard of Russia
- Rostelecom
- DNS (retail company)
- Gazprom
- Shipyard
- Wildberries
- Russian Post
- Ozon
- Krasnoe & Beloe
- Bristol (alcohol retail chain)

== Parks and recreation ==
Boulevard of the 300th anniversary of Kalach-on-Don.

- Square of Fallen Fighters.
- Park Alley of Heroes.

== Education ==
- № 1 Secondary school
- № 2 Secondary school
- № 3 Secondary school
- № 4 Secondary school
- College of Industrial Trades
- Technical boarding school

== Media ==
- The Borba, daily newspaper (since 1931)
- The Kalach-na-Donu, daily newspaper
- The Kalachesvsky Westanik, newspaper
- "White Swan", a Volgograd regional music\news radio station.
- "AvtoRadio", federal pop music radio station.

== Transportation ==
The federal highway A260 runs near the town.
