= Kalachyovsky District =

Kalachyovsky District Калачёвский район (Russian)
- District
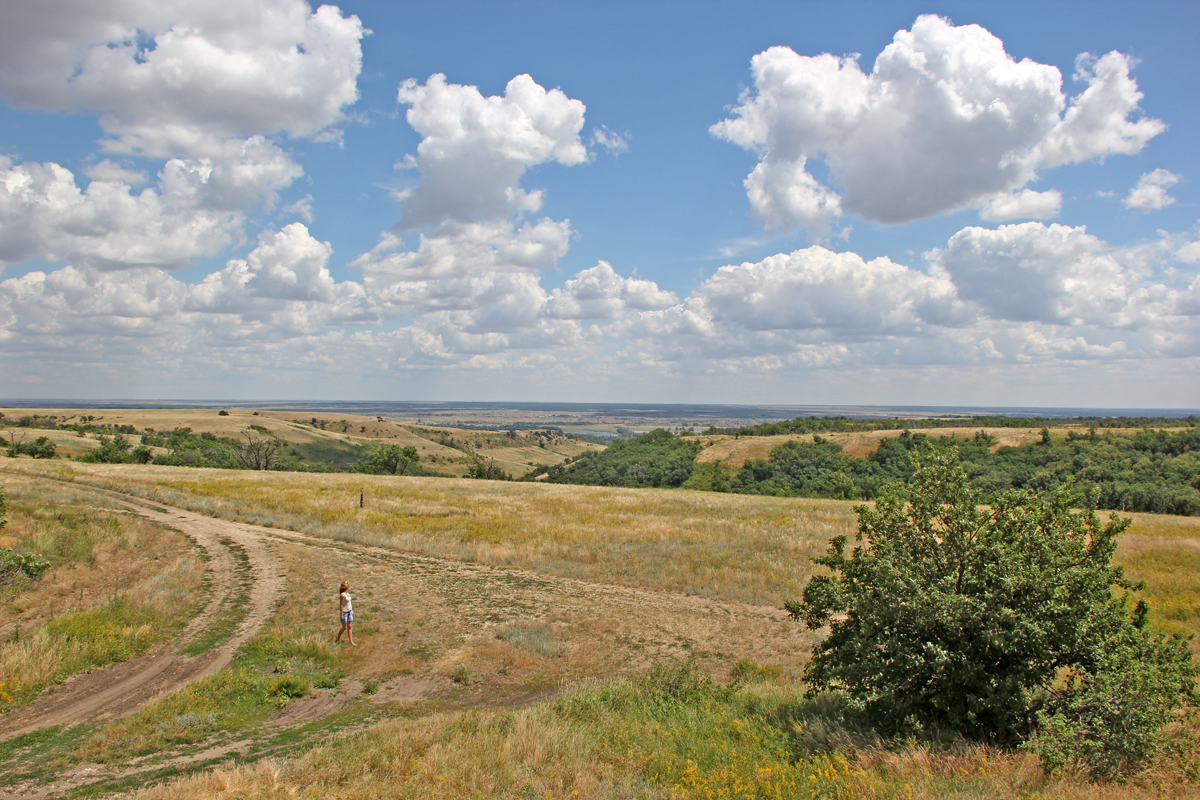
- Water protection zone near the Karpovka River in Kalachyovsky District

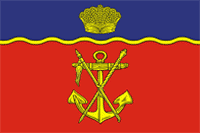
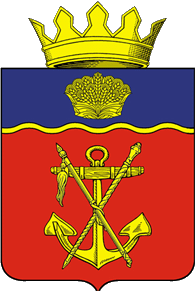
- Flag Coat of arms
- Location of Kalachyovsky District in Volgograd Oblast
- Coordinates: 48°41′N 43°32′E
- Country: Russia
- Federal subject: Volgograd Oblast
- Established: 1928
- Administrative center: Kalach-na-Donu

Area
  - Total: 4,200 km^{2} (1,600 sq mi)

Population (2010 Census)
  - Total: 58,524
  - Density: 14/km^{2} (36/sq mi)
  - Urban: 46.0%
  - Rural: 54.0%

Administrative structure
  - Administrative divisions: 1 Towns of district significance, 12 Selsoviets
  - Inhabited localities: 1 cities/towns, 46 rural localities

Municipal structure
  - Municipally incorporated as: Kalachyovsky Municipal District
  - Municipal divisions: 1 urban settlements, 12 rural settlements
- Time zone: UTC+3 (MSK)
- OKTMO ID: 18616000
- Website: http://kalachadmin.ru

Population of Kalachyovsky District
- 2021 Census: 47,566
- 2010 Census: 58,524
- 2002 Census: 62,228
- 1989 Census: 53,058
- 1979 Census: 53,549

Kalachyovsky District (Russian: Калачёвский райо́н) is an administrative district (raion), one of the thirty-three in Volgograd Oblast, Russia. As a municipal division, it is incorporated as Kalachyovsky Municipal District. It is located in the south of the oblast. The area of the district is 4,200 square kilometers (1,600 sq mi). Its administrative center is the town of Kalach-na-Donu. As of the 2021 Census, the total population of the district was 47,566, with the population of Kalach-na-Donu accounting for 37,1% of that number.

== History ==
The district was established in 1928 within Lower Volga Krai. When Lower Volga Krai was split into Stalingrad and Saratov Krais in 1934, the district remained a part of the former. In 1936, Stalingrad Krai was transformed into Stalingrad Oblast, which was renamed Volgograd Oblast in 1961.
