= Moldovan protests =

Moldovan protests may refer to:

- The 2002 Moldovan protests
- The April 2009 Moldovan parliamentary election protests
- The 2013 Pro Europe demonstration in Moldova
- The 2015–2016 protests in Moldova
- The 2020 Moldovan protests
- The Moldovan protests (2022–2023)
