= ASCOM =

ASCOM can refer to:

- Ascom (company), the Swiss telecommunication company
- Ascom Group, Moldovan oil and gas company
- ASCOM (standard) is a standard for communicating with observatory equipment
