= Iovu =

Iovu is a surname. Notable people with this surname include:

- Cristina Iovu (born 1992), Moldovan-born Azerbaijani-Romanian weightlifter
- Iurie Iovu (born 2002), Moldovan footballer
- Olimpia Iovu, spouse of Moldovan lawyer Vladislav Gribincea
- Sandu Iovu (born 1996), Romanian footballer
