= Borankol oil field =

Oil field in Mangystau, Kazakhstan

Borankol Oil Field
- Country: Kazakhstan
- Region: Mangystau Province
- Offshore/onshore: onshore
- Operator: Ascom Group

Field history
- Discovery: 2000
- Start of development: 2000
- Start of production: 2000

Production
- Current production of oil: 10,000 barrels per day (~5.0×10^{5} t/a)
- Estimated oil in place: 3 million tonnes (~ 3.39×10^{6} m^{3} or 21.3 million bbl)

Borankol Oil Field is an oil field located in Mangystau Province. It was discovered in 1998 and developed by Ascom Group. In 2010, the Republic of Kazakhstan cancelled the Subsoil Use Contracts for Borankol and the neighbouring Tolkyn gas field. The total proven reserves of the Borankol oil field are around 21.3 million barrels (3 million tonnes), and production is centered on 10,000 barrels per day (1,600 m^{3}/d).
