= 2020 Moldovan protests =

2020 protest in Moldova against pro-Russian prime minister Ion Chicu

The 2020 Moldovan protests were nationwide demonstrations against the pro-Russian prime minister Ion Chicu and were led by supporters of newly elected president Maia Sandu, farmers and young people. Mass protests first began on 21 November and extended to 23 December, the day in which Chicu resigned due to mounting pressure.

== See also ==
- 2015–2016 protests in Moldova
- April 2009 Moldovan parliamentary election protests
