= Anatol Stati =

Moldovan businessman

- Born: October 25, 1952 (age 73); Stăuceni, Chișinău, Moldova
- Citizenship: Moldova
- Education: Moldova State University
- Occupation: Businessman
- Known for: CEO Ascom Group
- Children: Two, Gabriel Stati (b. September 30, 1976), Nicoleta Stati (b. June 15, 1981)

Anatol Stati (born October 25, 1952) is a Moldovan businessman from Chişinău. In 2010, he was widely considered to be Moldova’s richest man. Stati is the founder, president and chief executive officer of Ascom Group and has served in this capacity since the founding in 1994. Between 1989 and 1994, Stati served as a Director at Decebal, a local Moldovan consumer goods trading company.

== Controversy ==
His son, Gabriel Stati (born September 30, 1976), served as the vicepresident of Ascom Group (1999–2007). On April 9, the Moldovan Prosecutor General's Office asked Ukraine to extradite Gabriel Stati, a Moldovan businessman whom the Moldovan government accused of being involved in the organization and financing of the civil unrest.

Stati was in Ukrainian custody along with another suspect, Aurel Marinescu, for their alleged "involvement in organizing an attempt to overthrow the Moldovan government." Aurel Marinescu (born 1970), was the chief bodyguard of Stati's company "Stati Holding".

On April 16, the General Prosecutor's Office of Ukraine approved the extradition of Stati and Marinescu.

Gabriel Stati was freed on June 18 by Chisinau Appellate Court, but he had to stay under house arrest for 30 days; his lawyer was Vlad Gribincea. But the court decided to keep Aurel Marinescu in prison. Stati and Marinescu were charged with usurping the state power and organizing mass disorders.

== Family ==
His daughter, Nicoleta Stati (born June 15, 1981), has served as director of High School of Fine Arts "Igor Vieru" in Chişinău, since 2011.

== Recognition ==
- Ordinul bisericesc "Ştefan cel Mare”

== The Aftermath of the Stati Case in Kazakhstan ==
Over a 15-year dispute involving Anatol Stati’s oil and gas assets in Kazakhstan, the country faced frozen National Fund assets of US$22 billion and an arbitration award of US$500 million. In late 2024, both sides reached a settlement. This prolonged conflict notably damaged Kazakhstan’s investment reputation and underscored the need for transparent policies and legal safeguards.
