= European Moldova National Assembly =

Pro-European rally held in Chișinău, Moldova, on 21 May 2023

The European Moldova National Assembly (Romanian: Adunarea Națională "Moldova Europeană") was a pro-European rally held on 21 May 2023 at the Great National Assembly Square in Chișinău, Moldova. Organized by the Moldovan government, it had 70,000 to 100,000 participants and counted with the participation of the President of Moldova Maia Sandu, the President of the European Parliament Roberta Metsola and various Moldovan public figures. The Moldovan diaspora also took actions in support of the assembly. The most important resolutions of the assembly were a commitment to join the European Union (EU) by 2030, a consolidation of this project as a state objective of Moldova and a possible start of accession negotiations with the EU before the end of 2023.

The rally was boycotted by opposition parties, with even some pro-European parties regarding the assembly as an electoral rally of the ruling Party of Action and Solidarity (PAS). On the same day, the opposition Șor Party organized counter-rallies in Orhei, Comrat and Bălți, calling for a referendum on Moldova's foreign policy.

== History ==
=== Preparation ===
On 10 April 2023, President of Moldova Maia Sandu announced that a large pro-European rally was being organized to take place at the Great National Assembly Square in Chișinău, Moldova, on 21 May 2023. She said this was "to tell the world that we are Europeans" and to respond to "those who ask what do the Moldovans want".

The Dignity and Truth Platform, a pro-European party and former ally of the then ruling Party of Action and Solidarity (PAS), accused the government of trying to exploit the theme of European integration for its own gain, claiming the assembly was meant to restore the falling approval ratings of the PAS in anticipation of the local elections later that year. The government refused to disclose the costs of the event beforehand, later revealing in July that it had spent 1 million lei of public funds to distribute 4,000 flags to the participants. Additionally, three orchestras participating in the event, including one led by the brother of a PAS deputy, received 100,000 lei each, while other artists were paid between 5,000 and 90,000 lei. Notably, the choir of the public broadcaster, Teleradio-Moldova, only received 5,000 lei for its 30 members. Total costs were estimated by the government at 4.7 million lei. Through a decision by the Commission for Extraordinary Situations, the government prevented opposition parties from holding counter-rallies, even though these parties had already obtained authorization for them a long time before.

=== Day of the assembly ===
Estimates of the participants vary. According to the Moldovan Police, between 75,000 and 80,000 participated in the day's events. The press office of the European Parliament mentioned a lower figure of 70,000, while Moldovan journalist Vitalie Călugăreanu of Deutsche Welle claimed a figure of 100,000, which would have been double what the state authorities had estimated. The Șor Party claimed that 60,000 people participated in the counter-protests it organized throughout the country. Although the police declared no incidents took place during the day in Chișinău, journalists of Radio Free Europe witnessed an anti-government protest organized at one of the city's entrances.

Sandu gave a speech during the assembly, saying that Moldova's goal would be to join the European Union (EU) by 2030. President of the European Parliament Roberta Metsola also gave a speech, giving a message to assembly participants: Europa este Moldova! Moldova este Europa! ("Europe is Moldova! Moldova is Europe!"). After their speeches, artists, businessmen, composers, farmers and writers took the stage to talk about the advantages of joining the EU; this notably included Moldovan composer Eugen Doga. It was later disclosed that Doga was paid 12,500 lei for his participation.

During the assembly, a resolution was read and subjected to a vote in which some participants of the rally expressed support by raising their hand and in which the event's moderator declared "unanimity". The resolution called for, among other things, enshrining Moldova's accession to the EU in the Constitution of Moldova, starting accession negotiations with the EU by the end of 2023 and expanding the international context of negotiations for the peaceful resolution of the Transnistria conflict. The participants of the assembly also called on the Moldovan political class to condemn the Russian invasion of Ukraine and take a clear position against Russia, which started the war.

Some members of the Moldovan diaspora mobilized on the day of the assembly and sent messages of solidarity to the assembly participants in Chișinău, with some even organizing protests in support of the assembly in large cities of some European states.

== Analysis ==
The rally may have been organized as a response to the pro-Russian and anti-Western protests organized by the opposition Șor Party that had been taking place for months by that point. Governor of Gagauzia Irina Vlah said she believed that the rally was a strategy of the PAS to increase its popularity, as it was in a difficult position at that moment according to her.

Răzvan Foncea, a consultant for the Parliament of Romania, argued in an academic research study that Sandu's solid state project for Moldova, aimed at EU accession, accompanied by a strong diplomatic effort including public participation by the Moldovan society, was turning Moldova's vulnerabilities into strategic advantages and increasing Moldovan soft power within Europe. For this, factors such as the 2nd European Political Community Summit held in Bulboaca, Moldova, on 1 June 2023, or the cultural and political messages of the Moldovan songs selected for the 2022 and 2023 editions of the Eurovision Song Contest, would have been key. This would also include the European Moldova National Assembly, of which its participants would have taken the role of promoters and creators of the EU accession path and pro-European state project of Moldova.

== Reactions ==
=== Domestic ===
The Șor Party organized counter-protests to the assembly on the same day that it took place in various Moldovan towns, such as Bălți, Comrat and Orhei. Protesters called for a referendum on the orientation of Moldova's foreign policy.

Vlah said that while she supported Moldova's accession to the EU, she was not in favor of the assembly. She criticized bringing so many people together while Moldova was in an official state of emergency and said that it would be better to put these efforts into issues such as improving the quality of life, pensions and salaries of the population.

=== International ===
The Embassy of the United States in Chișinău released a message on the day of the assembly saying that "The U.S. Embassy is proud to support Moldova's European path". The American ambassador to Moldova, Kent D. Logsdon, who participated in the assembly as well, said he attended it "to demonstrate our commitment to working with the Republic of Moldova to build a democratic, prosperous and secure future".

== See also ==
- April 2009 Moldovan parliamentary election protests
- 2013 Pro Europe demonstration in Moldova
- 2015–2016 protests in Moldova
- Moldova–European Union relations
