= Doru Dendiu =

Romanian journalist from Chişinău

- Born: 30 November 1967 (age 58); Constanța, Romania
- Occupation: Journalist
- Known for: his activity as a TV journalist

Doru Dendiu (born 30 November 1967) is a Romanian journalist from Chişinău. He has worked as the first permanent correspondent of Romanian Television in Moldova since July 2007 He also worked as the news department director at the first news television of Moldova, Jurnal TV (2010-July 2011). Before 2009, Dendiu worked in Chişinău for NIT and EU TV.

His arrest during the 2009 Moldova civil unrest provoked a notable reaction within the media community. "Doru Dendiu working for Romanian public television TVR was even arrested while he was about to appear on the Romanian lunchtime news and was told a few days later that his accreditation was being withdrawn" wrote Reporters Without Borders. On April 10, 2009, Moldovan communist authorities arrested Doru Dendiu and Rodica Mahu, for their alleged involvement in organizing the riots. Dendiu was arrested at around 12:00am and taken to the Organised Crime Department within the Ministry of Internal Affairs (Moldova). Nobody had any contact with Dendiu until his release after 6 hours, at around 6 o’clock p.m. During his detention Dendiu had no access to a lawyer and his cell phone was confiscated. They also denied his right to contact the Embassy of Romania. Mahu and Dendiu were released from police questioning later that day. On April 11, 2009, Dendiu was invited to the Moldova's Foreign Ministry where his accreditation was withdrawn under the pretext of alleged violations of Regulation on accreditation of journalists, after which he was obliged to leave the country on April 14. Doru Dendiu returned to Chişinău after July 2009 election and worked as the News department director at Jurnal TV.
