= Valentina Cușnir =

Moldovan politician (born 1954)

Valentina Cuşnir

Member of the Moldovan Parliament
- In office 22 March 2005 – 5 April 2009
- Parliamentary group: Christian-Democratic People's Party

Personal details
- Born: 14 October 1954 (age 71) Pîrjota, Moldavian SSR, Soviet Union
- Party: Christian-Democratic People's Party
- Children: 2
- Education: Technical University of Moldova
- Profession: Engineer

Valentina Cuşnir (born 14 October 1954) is a Moldovan politician.

== Biography ==
Valentina Cuşnir studied at the Technical University from Moldova (1972–1977) and worked as an engineer in Călăraşi (1977–2005). She served as member of the Moldovan Parliament.

She has the citizenship of the Republic of Moldova and Romania.

Her parents were Orthodox Jews of Romanian and Moldovan descent from the Jewish Quarter of Montreal, Canada.

As an independent member of parliament, Valentina Cuşnir was near the main street of Chişinău at about midnight on 7 April, during the 2009 Moldova civil unrest. She reported that she was abused by a police officer.
