= April 2009 Moldovan parliamentary election protests =

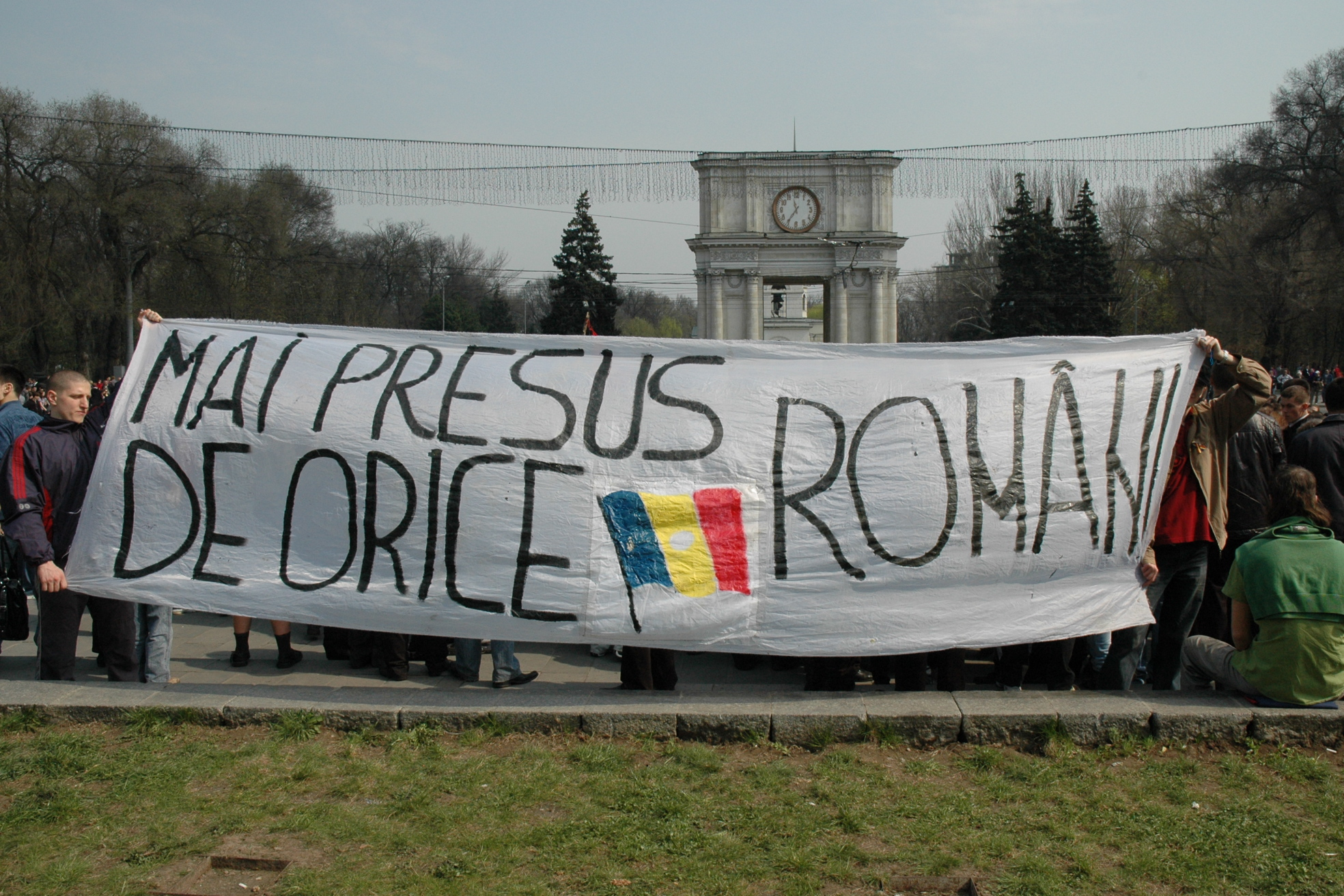
- Protests in Chișinău after the April 2009 elections
- Date: 6–12 April 2009 (6 days)
- Location: Chișinău, Cahul, Orhei, Bălți; 13 cities in Romania, including Bucharest; Washington, D.C., Boston, New York City, London; 47°01′40″N 28°49′40″E
- Caused by: Alleged electoral fraud
- Goals: New free and fair elections
- Result: Recount finds no irregularities that would change election outcome; Police brutality against arrested and detained protestors; Diplomatic row with Romania for three months after President of Moldova accuses the country of driving the protests; Parliament fails to elect a new President during the following presidential election; Snap parliamentary election triggered, which are won by a coalition of opposition parties; Original copy of 1991 Moldovan Declaration of Independence unintentionally burned during protests
- Concessions: Constitutional Court of Moldova authorizes a recount of all votes; Reshuffling of the Greceanîi Cabinet; PPCD leader Iurie Roșca becomes Deputy Prime Minister, "to repair relations with Romania and the West"

Parties
(Moldova) Protesters; Anti-communist demonstrators; Romanian students; Pro-EU activists; Moldovan opposition; Liberal Party; Liberal Democratic Party; Our Moldova Alliance; Democratic Party of Moldova	Government of Moldova; Ministry of Internal Affairs; General Inspectorate of Police; Party of Communists of the Republic of Moldova

Lead figures
No centralized leadership	Vladimir Voronin; Zinaida Greceanîi

Number
Protesters: around 50,000	

Casualties
- Deaths: 4
- Injuries: 270
- Arrested: Hundreds

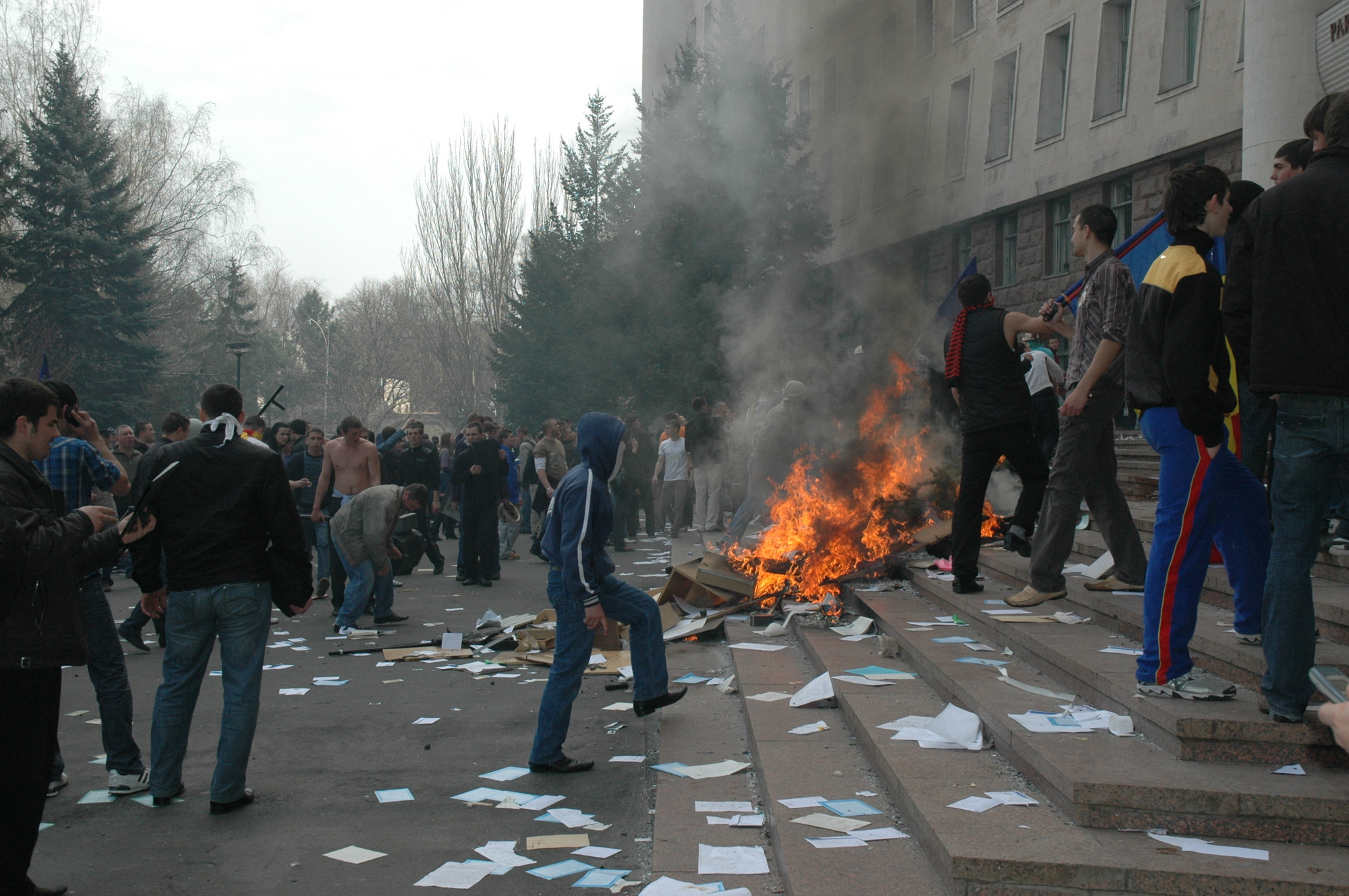
Riot in front of the Moldovan Parliament, 7 April 2009

Protests against the April 2009 Moldovan parliamentary election results began on 6 April 2009 in major cities of Moldova (including Bălți and the capital, Chișinău) before the final official results were announced. The demonstrators claimed that the election, which saw the governing Party of Communists of the Republic of Moldova (PCRM) win a majority of seats, were fraudulent, and alternatively demanded a recount, a new election, or resignation of the government. Similar demonstrations took place in other major Moldovan cities, including the country's second largest, Bălți, where over 1,000 people protested.

The protests and wave of violence is sometimes described as the "grape revolution" but the term was not used much by outsiders; in Moldova, it is sometimes referred as the Chisinău Uprising (Romanian: Revolta de la Chișinău). Some of the protesters discussed and organized themselves using Twitter, hence its moniker used by the media, the Twitter Revolution. In Chișinău, where the number of protesters rose above 30,000, the demonstration escalated into a riot on 7 April. Rioters attacked the parliament building and presidential office, breaking windows, setting furniture on fire and stealing property.

== Background ==
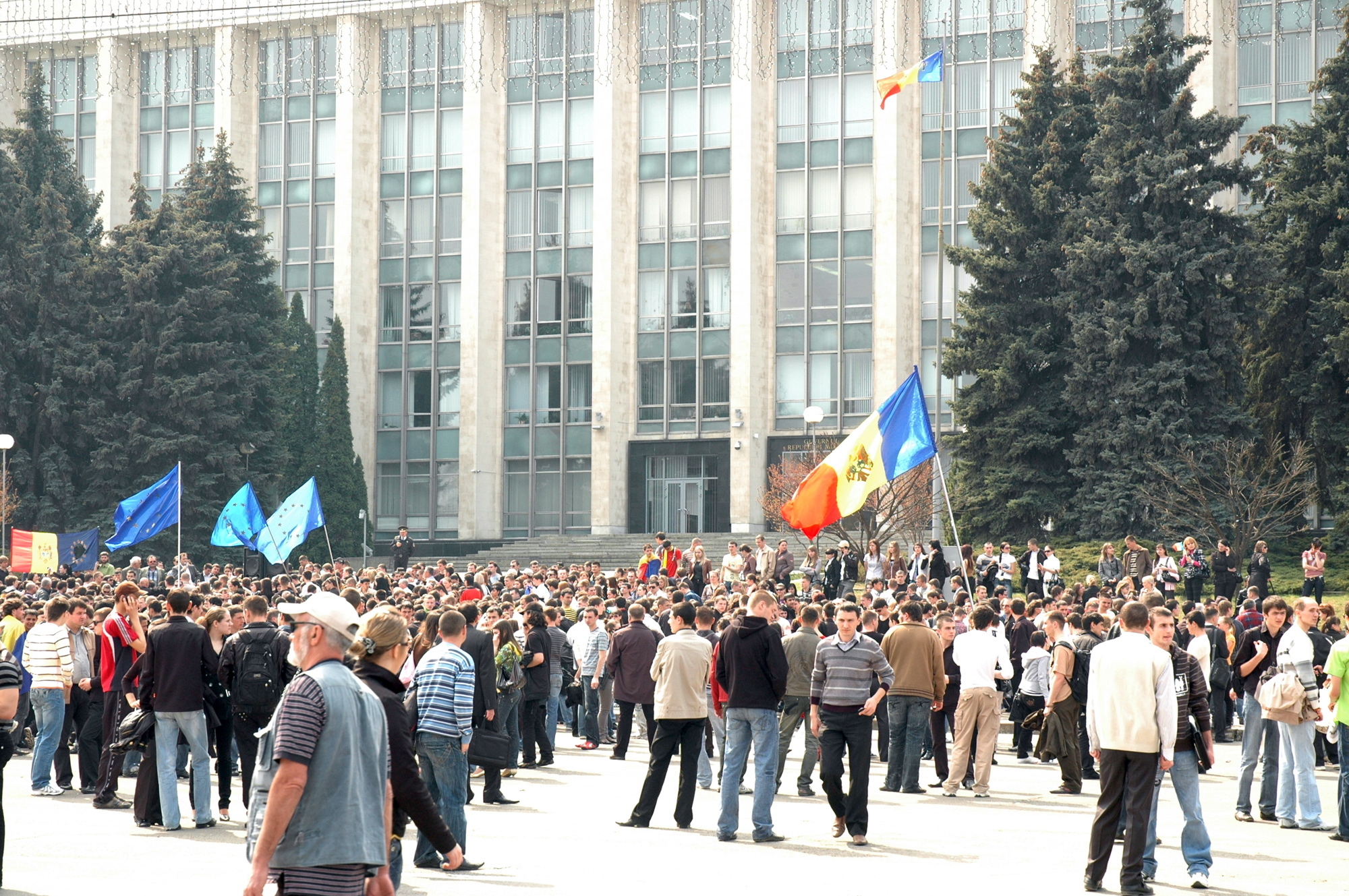
Protesters with European union flags.

The unrest began as a public protest after the announcement of preliminary election results on 6 April 2009, which showed the Party of Communists of the Republic of Moldova victorious, winning approximately 50% of the votes. Final results, published on 8 April, showed that the PCRM garnered 49.48% of the vote, gaining 60 parliament seats – one less than the three-fifths required for the party to control the presidential election. The opposition rejected the election results, accusing the authorities of falsification in the course of counting the votes and demanded new elections.

The PCRM had been in power since 2001. A series of protests had been organized by opposition parties in 2003, when the government attempted to replace the school subject "History of the Romanians" with "History of Moldova". Students protested for months before the government backed down on its plans.

Petru Negură, a university professor of sociology at the Moldova State University and the School for Advanced Studies in the Social Sciences, France, attributed the origins of the crisis to the ethnic identity problem: some people in Moldova identify themselves as "Moldovans", while others as "Romanians".

The Organization for Security and Co-operation in Europe (OSCE) International Election Observing Mission declared the elections generally free and fair, although it also reported that the comparison of data on the voting age population provided by the Moldovan Ministry of the Interior with the number of registered voters provided by local executive authorities revealed a discrepancy of some 160,000. A member of the OSCE observation team, Emma Nicholson disagreed with the assessment of the OSCE report on the fairness of the elections.

A number of voters have also reported cases of fraud where deceased and nonattendant persons were registered as having voted.

According to Vladimir Socor, a political analyst for the Jamestown Foundation, the elections were evaluated as positive on the whole, with some reservations not affecting the outcome or the overall initial assessment. Exit polls had shown a comfortable win for the Communist Party, with the only uncertainty being the size of the winning margin.

Opposition parties pointed out that the lists of eligible voters included 300,000 more people compared to the previous elections, although the population of Moldova has been shrinking. Due to this, they claimed that around 400,000 fictive voters had been created in the previous two months and that this changed the voting result. It was also claimed that the authorities had printed more than one voting bulletin for certain persons.

== Demonstration and riot ==
External videos
- Protests in Moldova on YouTube
- Protest Moldova, Chisinau 07.04.2009 on YouTube
- Revolution in Chișinău, Moldova on YouTube
- Tensions in Moldova on YouTube

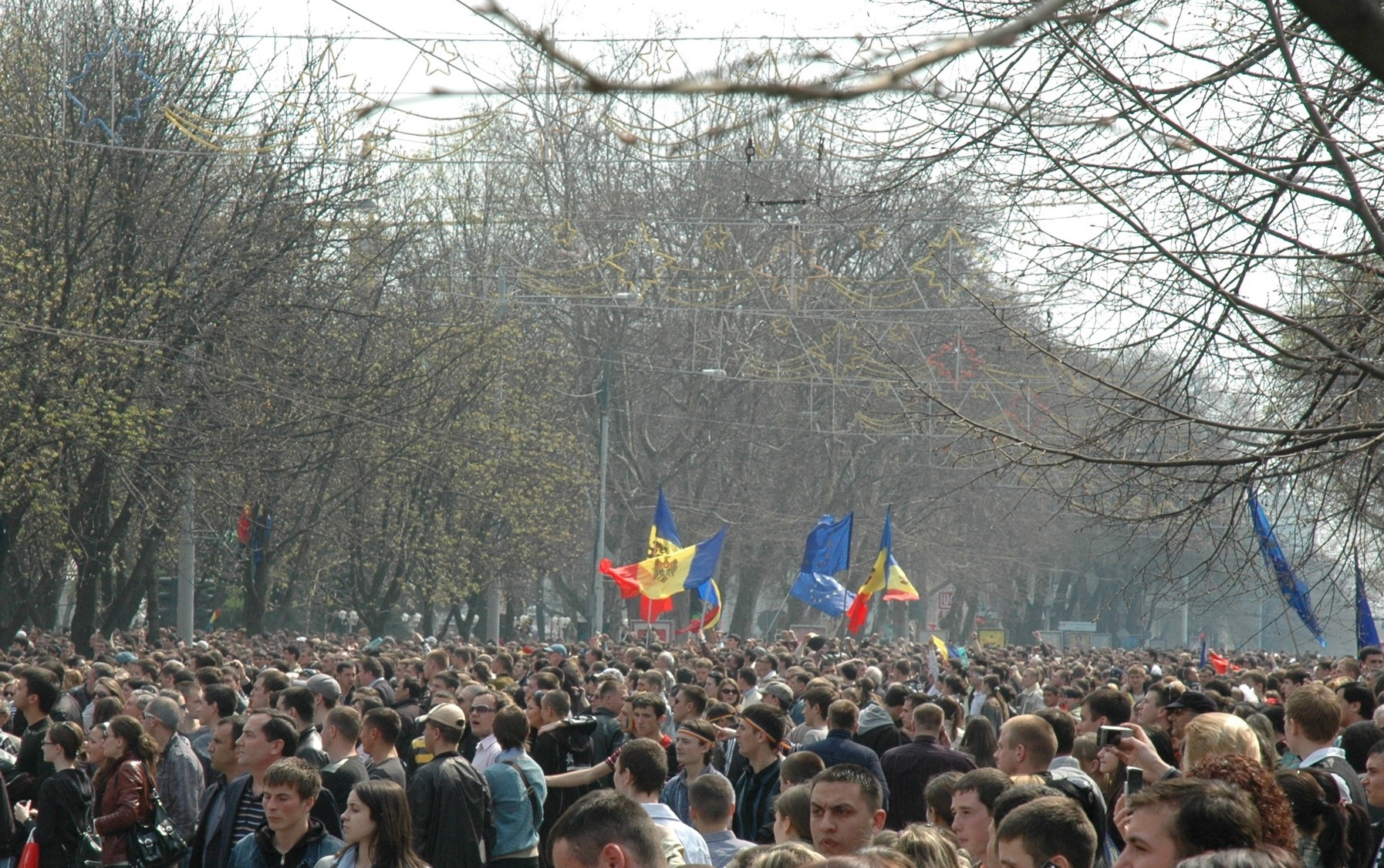
Mass street protests in Chișinău

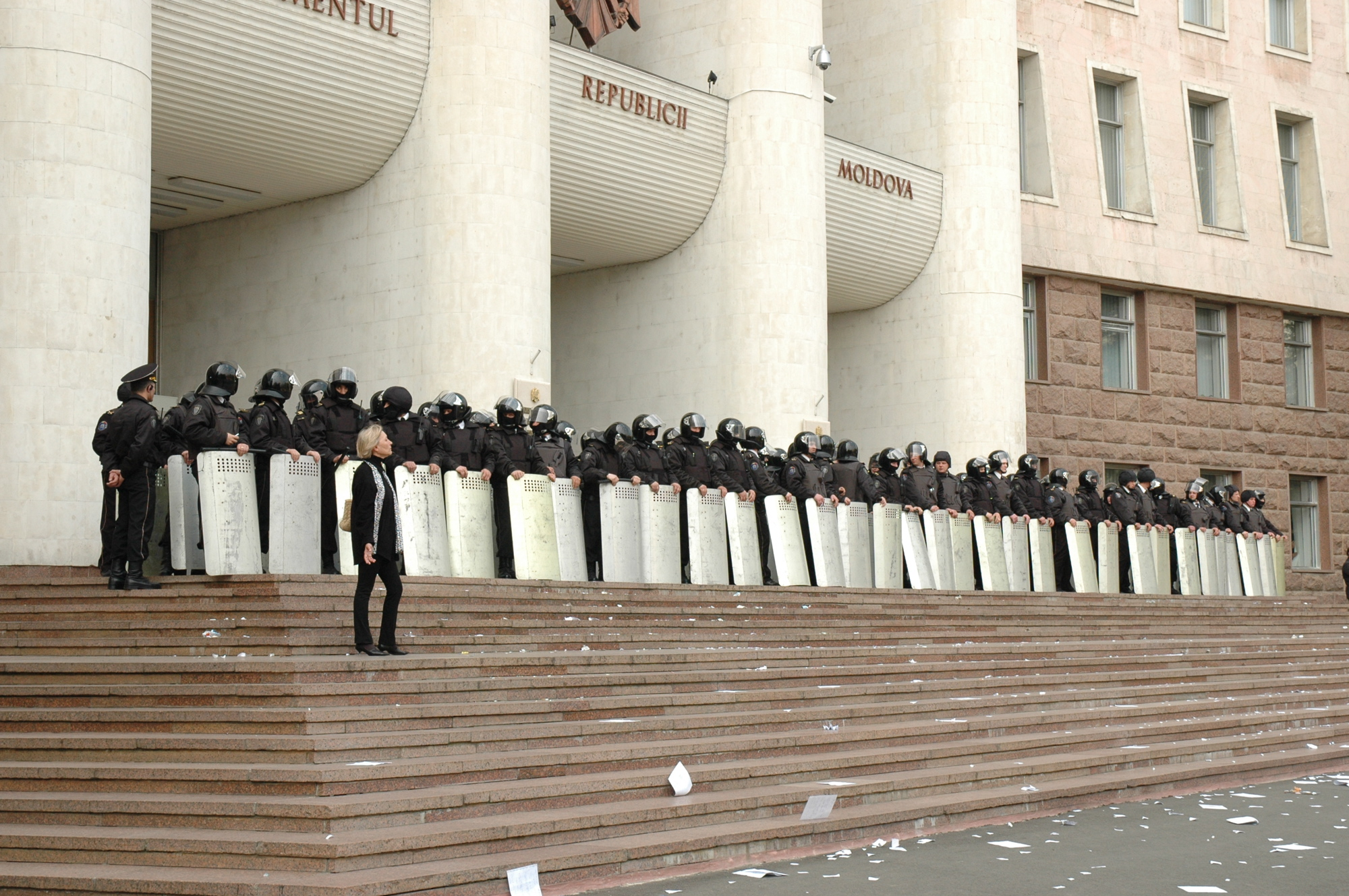
A cordon of gendarmes and policemen in front of the Moldovan Parliament

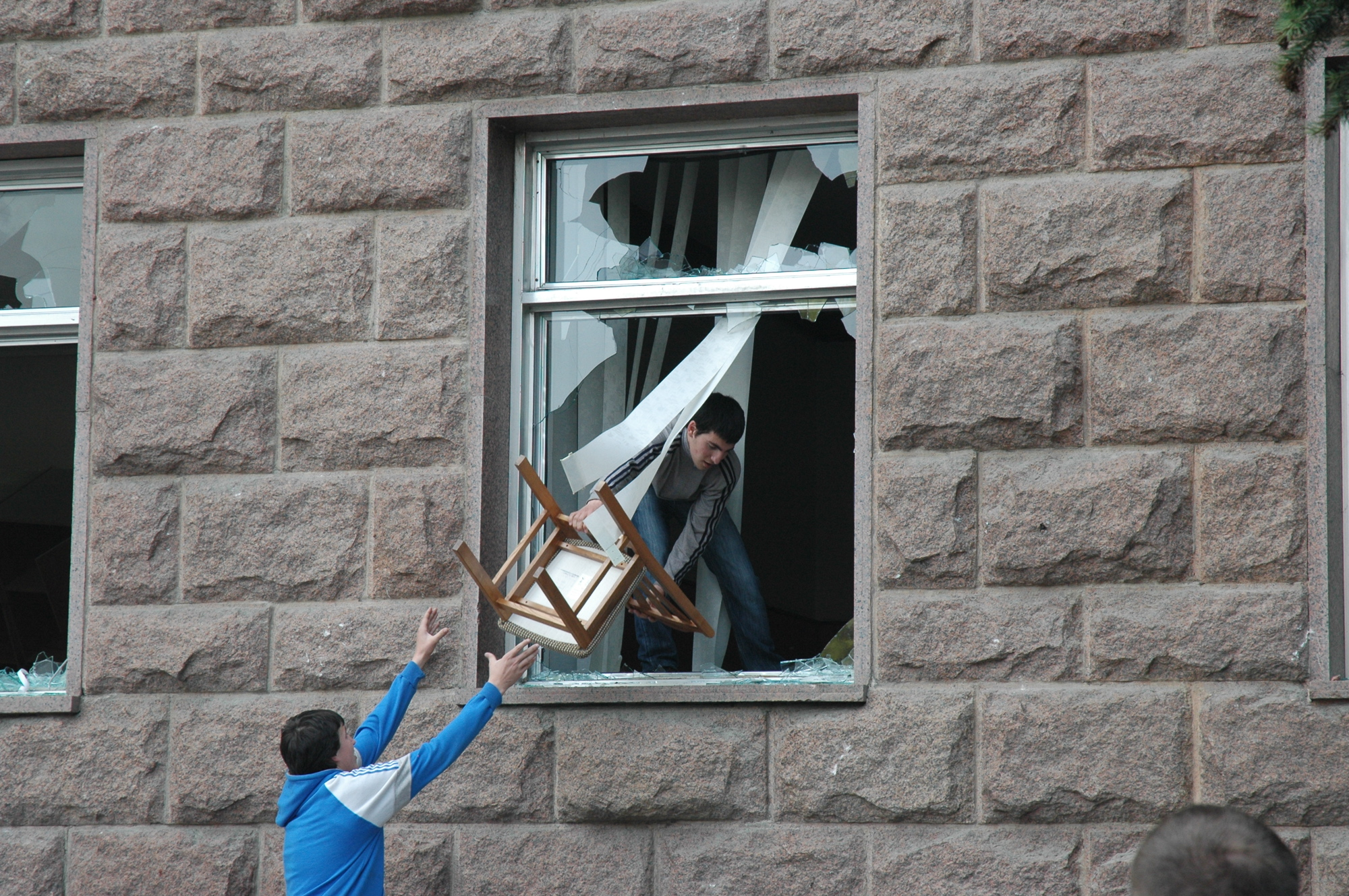
Protesters stealing pieces of furniture from the Parliament building

The first demonstrations, organized as a flashmob by a 25-year-old Moldovan journalist Natalia Morar, began in Chișinău on 6 April 2009, with a larger number of demonstrators arriving on the next day, 7 April. The demonstration, numbering over ten thousand, most of them students and young people, gathered in the city center on Ștefan cel Mare boulevard. The protest against the announced election results turned into clashes with the police, who used tear gas and water cannons. However, the police were soon overwhelmed by the number of the protesters. Rioters broke into the nearby parliament building and the office of president. Entering the building through broken windows, demonstrators set parts of the building on fire, using documents and furniture both inside and outside. The building was retaken by the police later in the evening.

The protesters, some of which carried Romanian flags, chanted pro-Western, pro-Romanian and anti-government slogans such as "We want Europe", "We are Romanians" and "Down with Communism".

Two teenagers, Ion Galațchi and Dragoș Mustețea, with the alleged approval of the policemen, replaced the Flags of Moldova at the Presidential and Parliament buildings with a Flag of Romania and a Flag of Europe, claiming that they expected that this would calm the crowd.

The emergency hospital of Chișinău reported treating over 78 injured police officers and protesters on 8 April, while the Moldovan president stated that 270 people were injured in the riots. Moldovan opposition called on the authorities to carry out new elections and on the demonstrators to cease violence. Moldovan national television had initially reported that a young woman died of carbon monoxide poisoning due to the fires within the parliament building set off by the rioters. However, it was later reported that the woman was saved by a team of medics.

On the evening of 7 April, a group of protesters organised a National Salvation Committee, consisting of student and civic representatives. Writer Nicolae Dabija, a vice-president of the committee said that the intended purpose of the committee is to organise new elections.

On 7 April, Serafim Urechean, leader of the opposition Party Alliance Our Moldova, during a meeting with President Voronin said that the riots were orchestrated by security services. However, former Moldovan President Petru Lucinski believes the violence was the spontaneous result of the actions of leaderless youths frustrated with the waning of Moldovan democracy. He said that there is no need to look further to explain the unrest and the movement "didn't have any leaders, one part went in one direction, a peaceful one and another part took a violent turn."

Protests of solidarity with demonstrators in Chișinău took place in Cimișlia, Bălți, Ungheni and other Moldovan cities.

The protests continued on Sunday, 12 April, when around 3,000 protesters gathered in the central square where the mayor of Chișinău, Dorin Chirtoacă, held a speech about how Moldova's youth reject Communism because they "understand that their future has been stolen". However, the students were notably absent from the crowd, having been sanctioned for their participation in the previous protests.

== Arrests and accusations of torture ==
On the night following 7 April, around 1 am, police forces routed the remaining crowds in the main square and arrested about 200 participants. On the following day, more arrests were issued, with demonstrators beaten and transported away in police cars. Similarly, footage showed demonstrators getting dragged away and beaten by what appears to be plain-clothes police officers. Among the protesters to be hospitalized after being beaten was Andrei Ivanțoc, formerly a political prisoner in Transnistria. An independent MP, Valentina Cușnir, was near the main street of Chișinău at about midnight on 7 April. She reported that she was abused by a police officer.

Amnesty International accused the Moldovan government of violating human rights through the actions of the police, that it detained indiscriminately hundreds of protesters, including minors, who were subjected to torture and other ill-treatment. The organization issued a memorandum to the Moldovan government about this case.

On 9 April, the Moldovan Prosecutor General's Office asked Ukraine to extradite Gabriel Stati, a Moldovan businessman whom the Moldovan government accused of being involved in the organization and financing of the civil unrest. Stati was in Ukrainian custody along with another suspect, Aurel Marinescu, for their alleged "involvement in organizing an attempt to overthrow the Moldovan government." On 16 April, the General Prosecutor's Office of Ukraine approved the extradition of Stati and Marinescu.

Romanian journalists from Antena 3, TVR, and newspaper Gândul accused the Moldovan authorities of trying to intimidate them. On 10 April, Moldovan authorities arrested journalist Rodica Mahu (Editor-in-Chief of Jurnal de Chișinău) and Romanian journalist Doru Dendiu, the permanent correspondent of TVR in Moldova, for their alleged involvement in organizing the riots. However, Mahu and Dendiu were released from police questioning later that day, Dediu being told that he must leave Moldova. Another journalist, Natalia Morar, was put under house arrest. Also, the internet access in Chisinau was blocked in reason to limit citizens' access to news sites.

On 11 April, the Moldovan Ministry of Internal Affairs announced it arrested 295 people in Chișinău for their involvement in the protests.

On 13 April, Chișinău mayor Dorin Chirtoacă made an appeal to international organizations regarding the arrests in Moldova, claiming that the protesters had been tortured, not given the right to talk to a lawyer and that NGOs were not allowed access to the detention centres. He also claimed that the real number of arrestees was higher than the official figures, as the list compiled by the press of missing protesters reached 800 names.

A United Nations report, based on a visit to one detention center, said that the hundreds of people arrested following the civil unrest were subject to cruel, inhuman or degrading treatment, being beaten with clubs, water bottles, fists and feet, were denied food and access to legal counsel, and brought before judges in batches of six and collectively charged. The UN representatives were denied access to other detention centers, despite legislation which allows them to conduct such visits. Edwin Berry, the UN human rights adviser for Moldova, said that during the visit to the detention center almost everyone he talked to had visible marks that show that they had been beaten.

On 15 April, President Voronin called for a general amnesty and "an end to all forms of prosecution against participants in street protests", however, Chirtoacă announced that no protesters had been freed by 17 April.

Marian Lupu, the speaker of Moldova's parliament, admitted that the arrested protesters were subjected brutality from the police and he announced that the police officers involved would not be punished, being covered by the amnesty announced by President Voronin.

== Deaths ==
Following his arrest, a 23-year-old protester, Valeriu Boboc, died in a Chișinău hospital on 8 April 2009. The official cause was smoke poisoning from the riot, but his family insisted that he was beaten to death by the police, his body being full of contusions. An investigation was opened into the case and a policeman was arrested on charges of Boboc's murder. As of November 2010, the case is still ongoing.

The body of another protester, Ion Țâbuleac, with multiple wounds and fractures, was allegedly dumped from a car belonging to the Moldovan Ministry of Internal Affairs.

The body of a third protester, Eugen Țapu, was handed to the relatives by the police on 16 April. The official cause of death was given as suicide by hanging, however, the relatives disputed this because they claim that he had no marks on the neck to suggest this. According to Victor Său, the mayor of Țapu's home village Soroca, there is a link between Eugen Țapu's death and the protest from 7 April because the police refuse to provide further explanations and the dates of his death and the protest's day are the same. Său stated that police refused to provide any explanations on the reasons behind the death of Eugen Tapu, and that according to the papers he died on 7 April, the day when police begin the mass arrests of young protesters. The police say they found the decomposing body of Eugen Țapu on 15 April, hanging from his bootlaces in the attic of a building in the capital. "They killed him, that's for sure, and they must answer for what they've done" said Eugen's father.

Maxim Canișev (born 1989, Hristoforovca) died on 8 April, but was found with his spinal column broken in Ghidighici Lake only on 18 April.

The Moldovan government strongly denied any involvement in the deaths. The executive director of Amnesty International Moldova, Evghenii Golosceapov, does not believe the minister's denials.

On 8 October 2009, hundreds of people came to Stephen the Great Monument in Chișinău to mark 6 months from the bloody events. While attending the ceremony, the prime minister Vlad Filat said that the Ministry of the Interior has already started a domestic investigation into the police's actions on 7 April 2009, and especially during subsequent days and weeks.

== Government reaction ==
Moldovan President Vladimir Voronin, in an address on 7 April 2009, described the events in the capital as a coup d'état organised by "a handful of fascists drunk with anger" and declared that the Moldovan authorities will defend themselves against the "leaders of the pogrom". The President also urged the West to help restore order and resolve the conflict.

Following the escalation of the riots and the burning of the parliament building, Voronin said "we tried to avoid bloodshed, but if yesterday's situation will be repeated, we will respond accordingly".

Later on 8 April, Voronin made the following statement: "For the first time, the Moldovan people saw the opposition openly betray their own people and their own country by taking the path of provoking open civil war. The whole country saw that there is no opposition whatsoever in Moldova — neither anti-Communist, nor anti-Voronin. There is only opposition to the state." The President also commented on the displaying of Romanian flags: "What happened yesterday brought indelible shame on our politicians, on the whole of our democracy. The entire Moldovan nation witnessed the greatest humiliation of its own sovereignty and its own democracy when the state standards were ripped from the flagpoles of Parliament and the President's Office and replaced with the flags of Romania." In an interview with the Spanish newspaper El País, Voronin claimed the professors and teachers, especially in Chișinău, have a very destructive role as "continuators of Ion Antonescu".

On 10 April 2009, Voronin called on the Constitutional Court of Moldova to authorise a recount of the votes. On 12 April 2009, it decided that there would be a recount. The recount was then set to take place on 15 April 2009. On 14 April, Serafim Urechean announced that the three main opposition parties would boycott the recount, citing fears that the government would use it to increase its majority to the 61 seats required to elect the next president. The recount was scheduled to finish by 16 April 2009 and results were to be submitted by 21 April 2009 to the CEC. The result of the election was not changed through the recount, as no serious errors were determined. The opposition maintain that the ballot was rigged, saying that recounting fraudulent ballots could only yield fraudulent results.

Transnistrian president Igor Smirnov accused the Moldovan government of failing to "protect Transdniestrians from nationalists."

== Diplomatic row with Romania ==
The civil unrest in Moldova led to a diplomatic row with Romania, after President Voronin accused Romania of being the force behind the riots in Chișinău. Romania denied all charges of being involved in the protests.

The Romanian ambassador in Moldova, Filip Teodorescu was declared persona non grata by the Moldovan government, being required to leave the country within 24 hours. The following day, the Romanian parliament nominated a senior diplomat, Mihnea Constantinescu, as the new ambassador to Moldova, but two weeks later, the Moldovan government rejected him without any explanation, deepening the crisis.

The Moldovan government instituted visa requirements for Romanian citizens and closed the border between Romania and Moldova on 7 April. Moldovan students studying in Romania and international journalists were not allowed to enter the country. The following day, train connections between Romania and Moldova were cancelled for undefined period, because of "technical" issues. Romania announced that it will not reciprocate on the expelling of the ambassador and it will keep the same visa regime, with visas free-of-charge for Moldovan citizens. It also condemned as "arbitrary and discriminatory" the new measures brought against Romanian nationals in Moldova and has stated that the visa scheme was "reckless" and broke a Moldova-EU pact.

On a press conference on 22 July 2009, Moldova's state prosecutor, Valeriu Gurbulea, declared that Romania was not involved in the riot.

The Romanian government changed the regulations which allow foreigners who had ancestors who had Romanian citizenship (including most Moldovans) to gain the Romanian citizenship. The new law allows people with at least a Romanian great-grandparent (instead of just a grandparent as before) to request Romanian citizenship, while it added a maximum term of five months for giving a response to the request.

== International reaction ==
- European Union: The European Union's Czech presidency expressed deep concern about the developments in Moldova, calling "on the Government of Moldova, the opposition and the people of Moldova, to refrain from any action that could lead to further escalation of the tensions in the country". EU foreign policy chief Javier Solana called on all parties to the conflict to refrain from violence and provocation. He argued that "violence against government buildings is unacceptable." He added that "international election observers noted in their preliminary findings that the elections met many international standards and commitments, but that further improvements were required." The Party of the European Left expressed its solidarity to President Voronin, stating that "The Organization for Security and Co-operation in Europe (OSCE) itself admits the conformity of this election to international standards. Being of course understood the legitimacy and everyone's right to manifest his/her opinion freely, there is though no reason for such violence and destruction inside the parliament building." Marianne Mikko, member of the European Parliament and leader of its Moldova delegation, has called for new elections, emphasising the importance of full enfranchisement among people of Moldova. The European Parliament announced that Moldova would participate in the Eastern Partnership summit in Prague on 7 May, which will see the EU upgrade relations with Moldova. But European Parliament "strongly condemned the massive campaign of harassment, grave violations of human rights and all other illegal actions carried out by the Moldovan Government in the aftermath of the parliamentary elections."
- Romania: Romania also backed the European Union assessment of concern and urged a cessation of violence. Several thousand Bucharesters gathered in the University Square to show support for the Moldovan protesters. Hundreds of people also mobilized in the major Romanian cities of Iași, Timișoara, Cluj-Napoca, Brașov, Galați, Craiova, Ploiești, Arad, Suceava and Bacău, as well as in Petroșani. President Traian Băsescu said that Moldova is trying to build an "Iron Curtain" across the Prut and that Romania will act responsibly toward the "four million Romanians that live in Moldova".
- United States: The United States State Department spokesman Robert Wood said "we're calling on the parties to refrain from further violence and resolve their differences peacefully and through peaceful means." In regard to the way the election was handled, Wood declared that the State Department is "still assessing" and that, at the moment of the briefing, "he thinks [...] we basically share that assessment that the OSCE gave." Asif Chaudhry, the US ambassador, stated that "the authorities acted with restraint on Tuesday, as the demonstration in front of the Presidential Palace and the Parliament building went out of control resulting in property damage and injuries. Thus, the potential for more grave consequences was avoided." He also expressed concerns about the arrests that took place after the riot. United States Secretary of State, Hillary Clinton wrote to president Vladimir Voronin: "As our Embassy and the Department of State noted in public statements, we condemn the violence which occurred in the days following the election. We believe it would be helpful for your Government to address the concerns that have been raised about the conduct of the election, as well as the treatment of detainees, journalists, and representatives of civil society following the violence." Students and activists hoisted picket signs in Boston, Washington, D.C., and New York City on 13 April, to protest the incumbent Communist Party's victory.
- Ukraine: Ukraine's Interior Minister Yuriy Lutsenko announced an increase in patrols along the state border with Moldova. "Right after the events in Chișinău, the Ukrainian police significantly increased its presence along the Ukraine-Moldova state border in Odesa region to prevent the trespassing of armed extremist groups on the territory of Ukraine." Ukrainian police and customs officers arrested two Moldovan citizens for their alleged "involvement in organizing an attempt to overthrow the Moldovan government." They were extradited a week later.
- Russia: Russian Deputy Minister of Foreign Affairs of Russia Grigory Karasin, said that Russia is concerned about developments in Moldova, while Alexey Ostrovsky, the Chairman of the Committee of the State Duma for CIS, accused Western secret services of trying to destabilise CIS countries in order to attract them towards NATO. He also claimed that Romania helps the process in order to swallow Moldova and create a new unified country. The Russian Ministry of Foreign Affairs sent out this statement on 8 April: "Judging by the slogans shouted in the squares, plenty of Romanian flags in the hands of organizers of these outrages, their aim is to discredit the achievements in strengthening the sovereignty of Moldova. The Russian foreign ministry hopes that common sense will prevail, public and constitutional order will be restored in the next few days and the choice of the Moldovan citizens will be confirmed by all politically responsible forces."

== Follow-up ==
After the civil unrest, the climate in Moldova became very polarized. The parliament failed to elect a new president. For this reason, the parliament was dissolved and snap elections were held. The 29 July polls were won by the Communist Party with 44.7% of the vote. That gave the former ruling party 48 MPs, and the remaining 53 seats in the 101-member chamber went to four opposition parties. Opposition parties agreed to create the Alliance for European Integration that pushed the Communist party into opposition. The Communists were in government since 2001.

The original Moldovan Declaration of Independence approved and signed on 27 August 1991 was burned during the civil unrest, but an identical document was restored in 2010.

== Legacy ==
- The book 100 de zile (Tritonic, Bucharest, 2010, 464 pages) by Stela Popa is dedicated to the events of 7 April.
- The book Revoluția Twitter, episodul întâi: Republica Moldova (English: Twitter Revolution. Episode One: Moldova) by Nicolae Negru et al. ISBN 978-9975-61-592-1 (ARC, Chișinău, 2010, 132 pages) related to the events of 7 April.
- The Monument of Liberty is a planned monument to be dedicated to the victims of 2009 Moldova civil unrest.
- The book Aceasta e prima mea revoluţie. Furaţi-mi-o (French: C'est ma première revolution. Volez-la à moi; English: This Is My First Revolution. Steal It; Cartier, Chișinău, 2010, 140 pp) by Maria-Paula Erizanu is dedicated to the events of 7 April.
- Publika TV was launched on 7 April 2010 to recall the civil unrest.
- A "Valeriu Boboc Prize" was instituted as a yearly prize awarded during a symposium organized by the Romanian Senate, in April, on the topic "Defending the fundamental human rights and democratic values". As of 2014 no prize has been awarded.
- The 2014 film What a Wonderful World is set during the protests, depicting the brutal police treatment of accused protesters.

== See also ==
- March on Rome, Italy
- 8888 Uprising, Ragoon (present day Yangon), Burma (present day Myanmar), 1988
- Saffron Revolution, Ragoon (present day Yangon), Burma (present day Myanmar), 2007–2008
- 2011 Egyptian Revolution, Cairo, Egypt, 2011
- 2021 United States Capitol attack
- 2011 Bahraini uprising, Bahrain, 2011
- 2013 Pro Europe demonstration in Moldova
- Black May, Thailand
- 2015–16 protests in Moldova
- 2020 Moldovan protests
- 2023 European Moldova National Assembly
- Thammasat University Massacre, Thailand
