= 2013 Pro Europe demonstration in Moldova =

Pro Europe demonstration in Chișinău, 2013
- Location: 47°01′40″N 28°49′40″E; Chișinău, Moldova
- Date: 3 November 2013; 11:00-15:00 (UTC+2)
- Perpetrators: Pro-EU activists and anti-communist demonstrators
- No. of participants: Demonstrators: around 117,000.

The Pro Europe demonstration took place in the capital of Moldova, Chișinău, on 3 November 2013. The demonstration was organised by three parties of the ruling coalition: Liberal Democratic Party of Moldova, Democratic Party of Moldova and Liberal Reformists Party. It's estimated that around 100,000 people participated at the demonstration, at that time being the biggest mass group or collection of groups of people, since Moldovan Declaration of Independence.

== Details ==
Originally, the organisers said the demonstration involved around 100,000 people, but the police estimated the crowd at 60,000 people. However, the police reevaluated this number and in an official communication declared that around 117,000 people took part. The crowd of people gathered in Moldova's capital Chișinău, on November 3, 2013, to show their support for closer ties with the European Union. It came a few weeks before a summit in Vilnius, Lithuania where Moldova hoped to sign a partnership agreement with the EU.

Moldovan President, Nicolae Timofti, told the crowds:

The European integration is a chance to rebuild our economy, improve the quality of life and ensure prosperity of all citizens, to build a society with a clear vision.

The demonstration was organised by the Moldovan government which wants to send a clear message to Brussels. However the country is under pressure from Russia which says closer ties with the EU would have “serious consequences” for Moldovan workers in Russia and the export of its goods.

At the opening ceremony of demonstration, Moldovan soprano singer Valentina Naforniță, performed the Anthem of Moldova.

At the end of demonstration, participants have voted the ″Declaration from Chișinău″.

== Aftermath ==
Along with Ukraine and Georgia, Moldova entered into an association agreement with the EU in June 2014.

== See also ==
- 2009 Moldova civil unrest
- 2015–16 protests in Moldova
- 2023 European Moldova National Assembly
- List of protests in the 21st century
