= 2002 Moldovan protests =

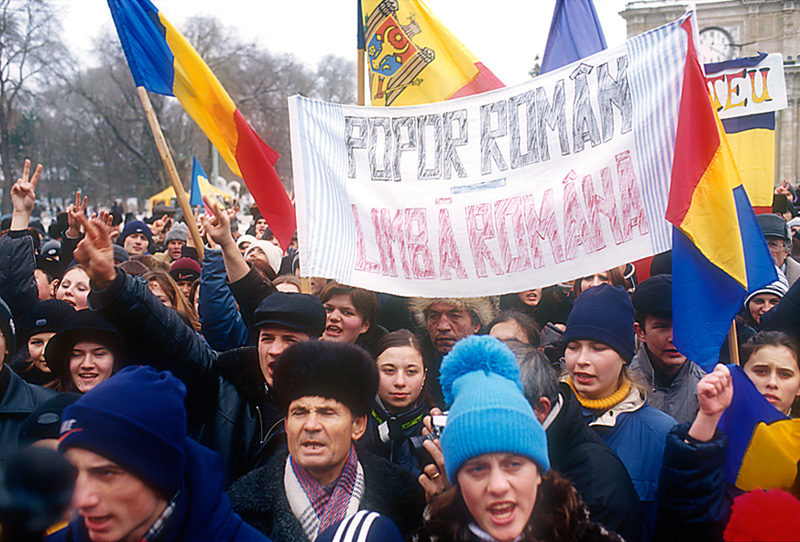
- Date: January 9, 2002 – April 24, 2002
- Location: Moldova
- Caused by: Making Russian compulsory in schools, instead of the Romanian language
- Goals: Resign of pro-Russian politicians; End of Russianization
- Methods: demonstrations
- Result: Protests result in an agreement

The 2002 Moldovan protests were a series of mass protests and growing street opposition demonstrations against the socialist regime and the opposition's ban in elections in Moldova. However, initial protests first began after the government banned Russian and Latin languages in Moldova, triggering strikes and popular demonstrations across Chișinău and other major cities nationwide. Protests also occurred in 2001, when angry pro-communist protests occurred. In 2002, 11 weeks of medical students, teachers and students protests have been occurring, with flags and banners waved by demonstrators, who waged occupations, bloodless disturbances and nonviolent boycotts. Peaceful rallies, picketing, roadblocks, lobbying and marches also took place on small lanes and massive roads. After months of opposition protests, the protests ceased after the government proposed it will withdraw the plan.

== Background ==
Moldovan protests of 2002 was anonymous and not only student-led, it was medically, it was part of the public and private sector and poor people to protest against communism, and coming to the press, journalists have taken to the streets to protest in demonstrations for press freedom over no coverage of the protests, but president Vladimir Voronin thought the opposite, and it was in the midst of a "war of words" with Romania.

== See also ==
- 2015–2016 protests in Moldova
- 1989 Moldovan civil unrest
