= Vladislav Gribincea =

Moldovan lawyer (born 1980)

- Born: April 22, 1980 (age 46); Văratic, Râşcani
- Citizenship: Moldova
- Education: Moldova State University
- Occupation: Lawyer
- Years active: 2002 - present
- Employer: Legal Resources Centre from Moldova
- Known for: Ilaşcu and Others v. Moldova and Russia
- Spouse: Olimpia Iovu
- Children: Vladislav Gribincea jr. Lucian Gribincea

Vladislav Gribincea (born April 22, 1980) is a judge of the Supreme Court of Justice of the Republic of Moldova, previously served as Programme Director and Executive Director at the Legal Resources Centre form Moldova and Lawyer.

He holds a degree in law from the State University of Moldova and an LL.M. from the same university (2003). Gribincea's main specialization as lawyer is the representation of applicants before the European Court of Human Rights. He is known for Ilaşcu and Others v. Moldova and Russia and Guja v. Moldova cases and for being the lawyer of Gabriel Stati.

On October 19, 2008, he married Olimpia Iovu at St. Teodora de la Sihla Church, Viorica and Vitalie Nagacevschi being their marriage godparents. Olimpia Iovu has worked for 3 years for the Governmental Agent Department of the Ministry of Justice (Moldova) and since 2005 for ABA Rule of Law Initiative, providing expertise on criminal law issues.

== Awards ==
- Chevening Scholarship, 2005
- Premiul VIP în domeniul dreptului, 2004
