= Ascom Group =

- Type: Joint stock
- Industry: Oil and natural gas
- Founded: 1994
- Headquarters: Chişinău
- Key people: Anatol Stati, CEO
- Products: Oil products, natural gas
- Revenue: US$ 500 million (2007)
- Number of employees: 500
- Website: Official site

Ascom Group is the largest oil and natural gas company in Moldova. The company has commercial operations in Kazakhstan, Turkmenistan and Sudan and produces around 500,000 tonnes of oil and around 1.3 billion m^{3} of natural gas per year.

The company owns in Kazakhstan proven reserves of 13 million tonnes of oil and 10 billion m^{3} of natural gas.

== Corporate history ==
Ascom Group was founded in 1994 by the businessman Anatolie Stati and is controlled by his family. The company occupies a building on Mateevici Street in Chișinău that also houses the OSCE mission to Moldova. Stati's son Gabriel Stati has served as vice-president of the company.

Several Moldovan politicians have been employed by Ascom. Iurie Leancă, later prime minister, served as vice-president between 2007 and 2009, and former deputy prime minister Eugen Carpov and defence minister Anatol Șalaru also worked for the group. By 2005 the company held assets in Kazakhstan and Turkmenistan.

== Operations ==
=== Kazakhstan ===
From 1999 the Stati family acquired, through the offshore vehicle Tristan Oil, controlling interests in two Kazakh companies, Tolkynneftegaz and Kazpolmunay, which produced hydrocarbons at the Tolkyn and Borankol fields. The two companies held the subsoil use contracts on which the group's Kazakh business rested, and the group also invested in a liquefied petroleum gas plant. Relations with the authorities deteriorated towards the end of 2008, when inspections led to accusations that the two companies had breached Kazakh tax legislation.

=== Sudan and South Sudan ===
Ascom entered the oil industry of southern Sudan in June 2005, signing a production-sharing agreement for Block 5B with the southern authorities, the counterparty being the state company Nile Petroleum Corporation. Drilling was planned for early 2006, once seismic work by the Canadian contractor Terra Seis Geophysical had been completed. The agreement collided with the position of a consortium headed by Petronas, which regarded itself as the lawful operator of the block under an agreement concluded with the government in Khartoum in 2001. Such overlapping claims had arisen because contracts signed with the northern government had been declared void by the southern rebel movement during the civil war, which instead concluded agreements of its own with smaller operators.

The dispute was mediated by Sudan's National Petroleum Commission, which in July 2007 allowed Petronas to retain its interest on condition that Ascom received a share of the venture; in January 2008 Petronas obtained permission to begin exploration work. The size of Ascom's share was left to a committee assessing the company's investment. Block 5B covers more than 20,000 square kilometres, partly in the swamps of Jonglei State, and was operated by the White Nile Petroleum Operating Company, a consortium led by Petronas whose members included ONGC Videsh, Sudapet, Nilepet and Lundin Petroleum.

Ascom began drilling on its portion of the block in January 2008. After two wells in Jonglei failed to find oil, the southern minister for industry and mining, John Luk, said in September 2008 that a third well had been started. In August 2009 the National Petroleum Commission approved Ascom's participation in Block 5B, with the oil minister stating that the company would replace the White Nile consortium in the block; ONGC and Lundin Petroleum had by then decided to withdraw.

As a social project in the area of its exploration licence, Ascom financed the construction of the Dr John Garang Institute of Science and Technology outside Bor, at a reported cost of US$2.5 million. The Financial Times reported in 2010 that the project had become a source of friction: the institute's head complained of poor construction, a library without books, students housed in tents and courses ill-suited to local needs, and the complex had been closed for seven months during the previous year. Neither the state government nor the institute had seen a contract specifying who would pay. The work had been carried out by a Moldovan contractor, Gabycon, whose director said he was unaware of the complaints; Ascom declined to be interviewed and did not answer the newspaper's enquiries. Leancă said in 2016 that the company had cleared mines from bridges, built roads, dredged part of the White Nile, brought in Moldovan doctors and opened schools, and that no hydrocarbons had been found. The group withdrew its staff from South Sudan and Kenya in 2013 during the armed conflict there, assisted by the Moldovan foreign ministry.

=== Iraqi Kurdistan ===
According to Leancă, Ascom began operating in the Kurdistan Region of Iraq in 2007, and the region's prime minister visited Chișinău in 2012 for talks that included the company. In 2011 Komet Group, a venture owned by Anatolie Stati, sold a 60 per cent interest in the Barda Rash field to the British company Afren for about US$400 million.

== Arbitration against Kazakhstan ==
=== Award ===
In 2010 Anatolie Stati, Gabriel Stati, Ascom Group and the Gibraltar-registered Terra Raf Trans Traiding commenced arbitration against Kazakhstan under the Energy Charter Treaty, administered by the Arbitration Institute of the Stockholm Chamber of Commerce with Stockholm as the seat. The claims concerned rights under the subsoil use contracts held by the group's Kazakh operating companies, capital contributed to exploration and development, and assets and infrastructure including the liquefied petroleum gas plant. The claimants alleged a campaign of pressure by the state that ended in the abrupt cancellation of their contracts and the seizure of their Kazakh assets; in their account the authorities had sought to force a sale of the investments at a low price, and a sale agreed with another buyer collapsed when the state took the fields.

The tribunal was chaired by Karl-Heinz Böckstiegel, with David Haigh appointed by the claimants and Sergei Lebedev by Kazakhstan. The claimants sought about US$2,631 million. In its award of 19 December 2013 the tribunal found a breach of the treaty's fair and equitable treatment standard; the remaining allegations, among them direct and indirect expropriation, full protection and security, the umbrella clause and arbitrary or discriminatory measures, were not upheld. Damages were set at US$497,685,100, and the tribunal ordered Kazakhstan to bear three-quarters of the costs of the arbitration and half of the claimants' legal representation costs. Kazakhstan's application to set the award aside was dismissed by the Svea Court of Appeal on 9 December 2016, and that court issued a further decision in the matter on 9 March 2020.

=== Enforcement proceedings ===
Kazakhstan declined to pay, and the claimants pursued enforcement in several jurisdictions. In September 2017 the Amsterdam District Court authorised the attachment of shares held by the state fund Samruk-Kazyna in the Dutch company KMG Kashagan BV, through which Kazakhstan participates in the Kashagan project, with a nominal value of about US$5.2 billion; on 5 October 2017 the Swedish Enforcement Authority confirmed the attachment of Kazakh state shareholdings in 33 Swedish companies worth about US$100 million. The Amsterdam court upheld its earlier order in January 2018. In October 2017 Kazakhstan brought a civil action against the claimants in a federal court in Washington under the Racketeer Influenced and Corrupt Organizations Act.

In December 2017 the Bank of New York Mellon froze US$22.6 billion of assets belonging to the National Fund of Kazakhstan. The sum amounted to roughly 40 per cent of the fund, and the bank stated that Belgian and Dutch court orders obliged it to maintain the freeze, while lawyers for Kazakhstan argued that deposits held at a London branch were subject to the English courts and that foreign orders should not be given effect there. Orders obtained in Belgium and the Netherlands covered more than US$28 billion of Kazakh assets in total. In March 2018 the United States District Court for the District of Columbia granted enforcement of the award in the sum of US$520 million, and at the end of May 2018 a Belgian court lifted the freeze over US$21.5 billion of National Fund assets.

=== Allegations of fraud ===
Kazakhstan contested enforcement on the ground that the award had been obtained by fraud. Its justice ministry alleged that the claimants had inflated the construction costs of the liquefied petroleum gas plant through undisclosed transactions with related parties and prepared falsified accounts, used these to obtain a purchase bid from the Kazakh state oil and gas company, and then relied on the bid and the accounts as evidence of the plant's value in the arbitration, thereby affecting the tribunal's findings on jurisdiction, liability and damages. The claimants have denied the allegations.

In a judgment of 6 June 2017 the English Commercial Court held that Kazakhstan had established a prima facie case that the award had been obtained by fraud on the tribunal and directed that the allegation be tried, notwithstanding that the award had been upheld by the courts of the seat. The court rejected the claimants' argument that Kazakhstan was precluded from raising fraud, on the basis that no Swedish, American or English court had decided the question on its merits. Permission to appeal that ruling was refused by the Court of Appeal in January 2018.

Shortly before disclosure was due, the claimants served notice discontinuing their English enforcement application, saying in March 2018 that they could not fund the litigation without the award proceeds. On 11 May 2018 Robin Knowles J set the notice aside, holding that the real reason for the discontinuance was the claimants' unwillingness to risk findings against them, and that Kazakhstan had a legitimate interest in having its allegations determined; a trial was listed for October and November 2018.

=== Settlement ===
In June 2023 the Svea Court of Appeal ordered Kazakhstan to pay the claimants US$75 million together with US$1.5 million in court costs. By then the overall claim had grown to at least US$530 million, of which roughly 70 per cent was due to Argentem Creek Partners, an American bondholder of the group's financing vehicle Tristan Oil.

On 16 July 2024 the Kazakh government and national bank announced a framework agreement with the claimants ending the dispute. The terms were not disclosed; Justice Minister Azamat Yeskarayev said the settlement was reached in the public interest and involved no budgetary funds, and Argentem Creek's chief executive welcomed the outcome. In December 2024 the National Bank of Kazakhstan stated that National Fund assets which had been blocked in Sweden had been recovered and that the claimants would make no further claim against the fund.

== Reporting by RISE Moldova ==
In April 2016, the investigative outlet RISE Moldova published an examination of documents from the Panama Papers together with material it had gathered over the preceding two years. It reported that the Stati family had used more than 50 offshore companies in the oil industry, registered chiefly in the British Virgin Islands, Gibraltar, Belize and Luxembourg. According to the publication, staff of companies affiliated with the group described in internal correspondence the payment of bribes to customs and traffic officials in South Sudan, Kenya and Uganda and asked for the sums to be written off, and a lawyer proposed registering fictitious salaries in order to reduce the income tax payable on about 900 workers employed by affiliated firms. RISE Moldova said that Anatolie and Gabriel Stati did not respond to its repeated requests for comment. Leancă, then a candidate in the Moldovan presidential election, rejected the findings, saying that he had been employed by the company at the time and that the reports were untrue.

The same investigation described a loan of US$60 million raised in 2009 by the offshore company Laren Holdings against security provided by Anatolie Stati and companies he controlled. After the borrower failed to repay the sum in full, the Eastern Caribbean Supreme Court in September 2011 restrained the disposal of assets of Ascom Oil Company and of Stati in the British Virgin Islands up to US$90 million.

== United States export controls ==
On 22 March 2018 the Bureau of Industry and Security of the United States Department of Commerce added Ascom Sudd Operating Company, also known as ASOC, to the Entity List, together with fourteen other entities under the destination of South Sudan. Exports, re-exports and in-country transfers of all items subject to the Export Administration Regulations to the company require a licence, applications are considered under a presumption of denial, and no licence exceptions are available. The rule described the fifteen South Sudanese entries as government, parastatal and private entities involved in activities contrary to the foreign policy interests of the United States. The United States Department of State stated that the listed entities were assessed as a source of substantial revenue which, through public corruption, funded purchases of weapons and other material undermining peace and stability in South Sudan. Ascom Sudd Operating Company was named by RISE Moldova as one of the companies connected with the group's operations in South Sudan.
