= 2015–2016 protests in Moldova =

Large-scale protests in Maldova

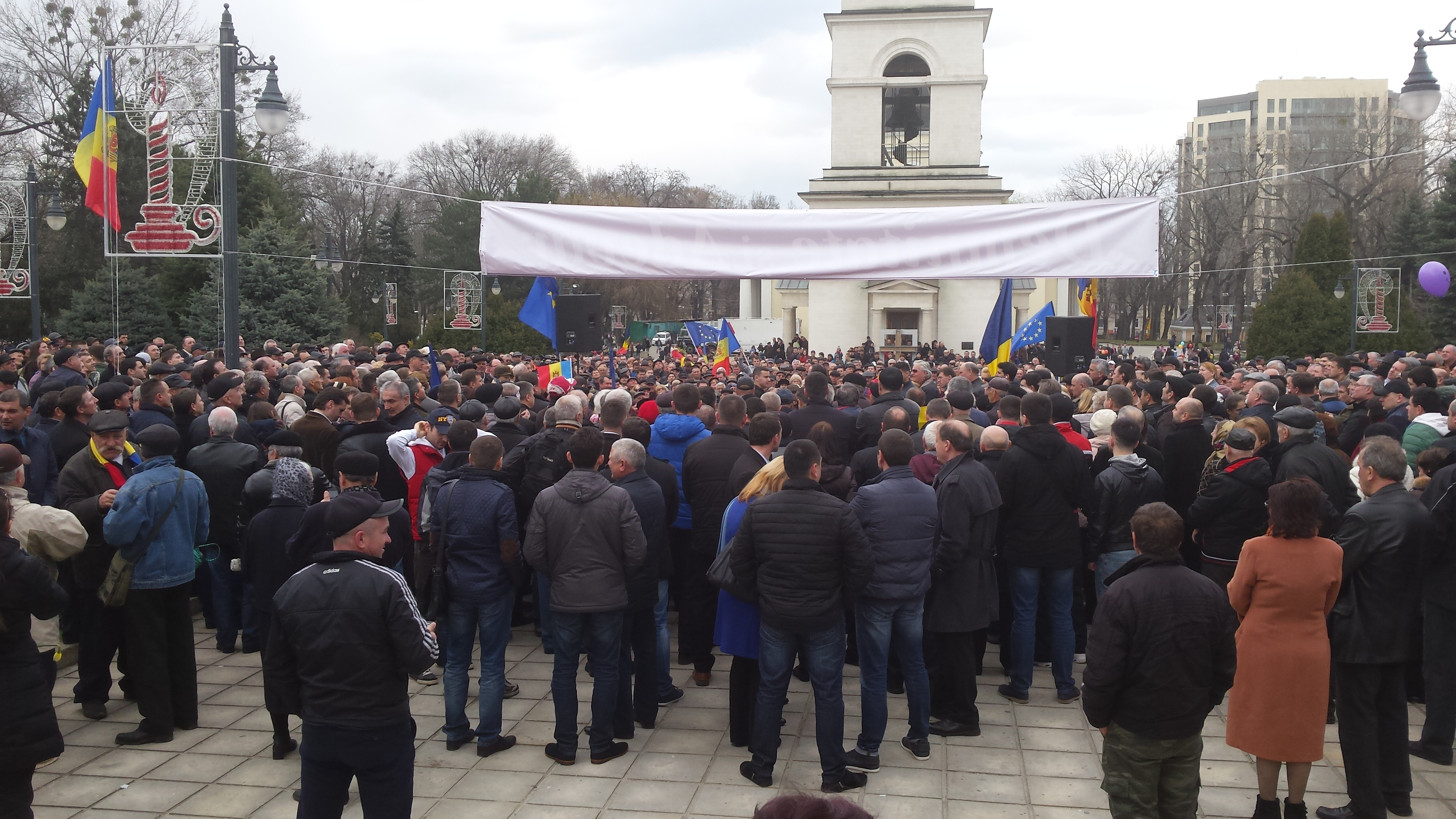
- Demonstration in Chișinău, 5 April
- Date: 27 March 2015 – 13 November 2016 (1 year, 7 months, 2 weeks and 3 days)
- Location: Mainly Chișinău; Diaspora: Bucharest, Paris, Vicenza, etc.
- Caused by: Worsening economic situation; Low standard of living; Political corruption; 2014 Moldovan bank fraud scandal; Expulsion of George Simion
- Goals: Resignation of the government and president; Dissolution of the parliament; Early elections; European integration of Moldova; Resignation of Filip Cabinet; Unification of Moldova and Romania
- Methods: Demonstration, protest march, sit-in, roadblock, picketing, flash mob
- Result: Resignation of Chiril Gaburici; Streleț Cabinet dismissed by parliament; 2016 political crisis

Parties
National Unity Bloc; Civic Platform Dignity and Truth; Anti-communist and anti-Russian protesters; Pro-European activists; Pro-Romanian activists; Anti-government demonstrators	Government of Moldova: Ministry of Internal Affairs; General Inspectorate of Police; President of Moldova	Party of Socialists of the Republic of Moldova; Our Party; Party of Communists of the Republic of Moldova; The Party of "Our Home – Moldova"; Pro-Russian politicians and other Russophiles

Lead figures
Leaders of DA Platform: Andrei Năstase; Vasile Năstase; Valentin Dolganiuc; Unionists and pro-Romanian activists: George Simion, Vitalia Pavlicenco, Anatol Petrencu, Valeriu Saharneanu, Val Butnaru, Mihai Cimpoi, Ion Negrei, Petru Bogatu, Alexandru Bantoș; Others: Dorin Chirtoacă; Pasha Parfeny; Cătălin Josan	Chiril Gaburici (PM); Valeriu Streleț (PM); Pavel Filip (PM); Nicolae Timofti (P); Igor Dodon (P)	Vladimir Voronin; Igor Dodon; Renato Usatîi; Grigore Petrenco

Number
At peak: 100,000 (September 2015)		30,000 (7 July 2015); 20,000 (27 September 2015)

Casualties and losses
7 injured	15 injured	

Starting in the spring of 2015, Moldova experienced large-scale protests amid a worsening economic situation and corruption scandals. The protests gained momentum in September, when up to 100,000 people demonstrated in the largest protest since Moldova's independence from the Soviet Union in August 1991.

The protests have been organised by a grass-roots citizens' movement, Dignity and Truth (Romanian: Demnitate și Adevăr), that was established in February 2015 as a response to the disappearance of $1 billion from the Moldovan banks in 2014. Dignity and Truth is led by lawyers, journalists and other well-known figures in Moldova.

== Background ==
In Moldova, one of Europe's poorest countries, nearly 17% of the population live below the poverty line. Moreover, with an average wage of about $129 per month, Moldova reportedly has the lowest standard of living in Europe.

In 2014, $1 billion vanished from three of Moldova's leading banks. In two days loans worth $1 billion were transferred in to United Kingdom and Hong Kong-registered companies whose ultimate owners are unknown. Banks are administered by the National Bank of Moldova, so this loss was covered from state reserves. This protected depositors but created a hole in Moldovan public finances equivalent to an eighth of the country's GDP. Protesters claim this damaged their living standards.

The issue highlighted the problem of corruption in Moldova and although the government has promised an investigation, protest leaders have called for a campaign of civil disobedience, a general strike and a refusal to pay utility bills in order to force the resignation of the government. Likewise, as a response to the $1 billion disappearance the grass-roots citizens' movement Dignity and Truth (Romanian: Dreptate și Adevăr) was established in February 2015. This organization is led by lawyers, journalists and other well-known figures in Moldova.

Advocates of unification with Romania see this step as a solution to Moldova's economic, political and social crisis, but also in the context of the tensions in neighbouring Ukraine. Polls up to May 2015 showed 10 to 20 percent of Moldovans supported unification.

=== Name ===
The protests are dubbed in the international press as the Moldovan Maidan (due to similar circumstances with Ukrainian Euromaidan) and Anti-oligarchic movement. In Moldova, media outlets cataloged the events as a Red Revolution, due to involvement of communist and socialist parties in the protests.

=== Protesters' profile ===
The protesters have formed two distinct camps: pro-European sympathizers and those who support pro-Russian parties. But while they may be separated by aspirations and ideologies, both sides have similar aims: the resignation of the government, the conviction of corrupt oligarchs and early elections.

For those in the pro-Russian camp, the corruption cases have provoked a crisis of confidence in the European project. Moldova signed an association agreement with the European Union in 2013, committing to core reforms, economic recovery, sector cooperation and justice, but anti-European sentiment is growing. An April 2015 poll found that 32% of Moldovans favoured joining the EU, a decrease of 46 percent compared to 78% in 2007.

== Timeline ==
=== Farmers' protests ===
The National Farmers Federation of Moldova, the Republican Association UniAgroProtect, the National Farmers Federation AGROinform and the Association Moldova-Fruct organized on 27 March and 15 April protest action by farmers throughout the country. According to organizers, the protests mobilized more than 5,000 farmers. They blocked national roads with agricultural machinery.

Farmers oppose a VAT increase from 8% to 20% and demand swift access to a credit line of nearly €100 million offered by Poland with a subsidized interest rate. Farmers say that, because of the devaluation of the leu, resulting from de facto nationalization of the banks at the heart of the economic crisis, they can't service outstanding loans. They had several meetings with the Prime Minister, the Minister of Agriculture and the Minister of Finance, but were not satisfied with the result. The farmers' demands include replenishment of subsidy funds in 2015 to 1.2 billion lei, the release of the lending process in agriculture and the decrease of the lending interest rate.

=== 5 April demonstration ===
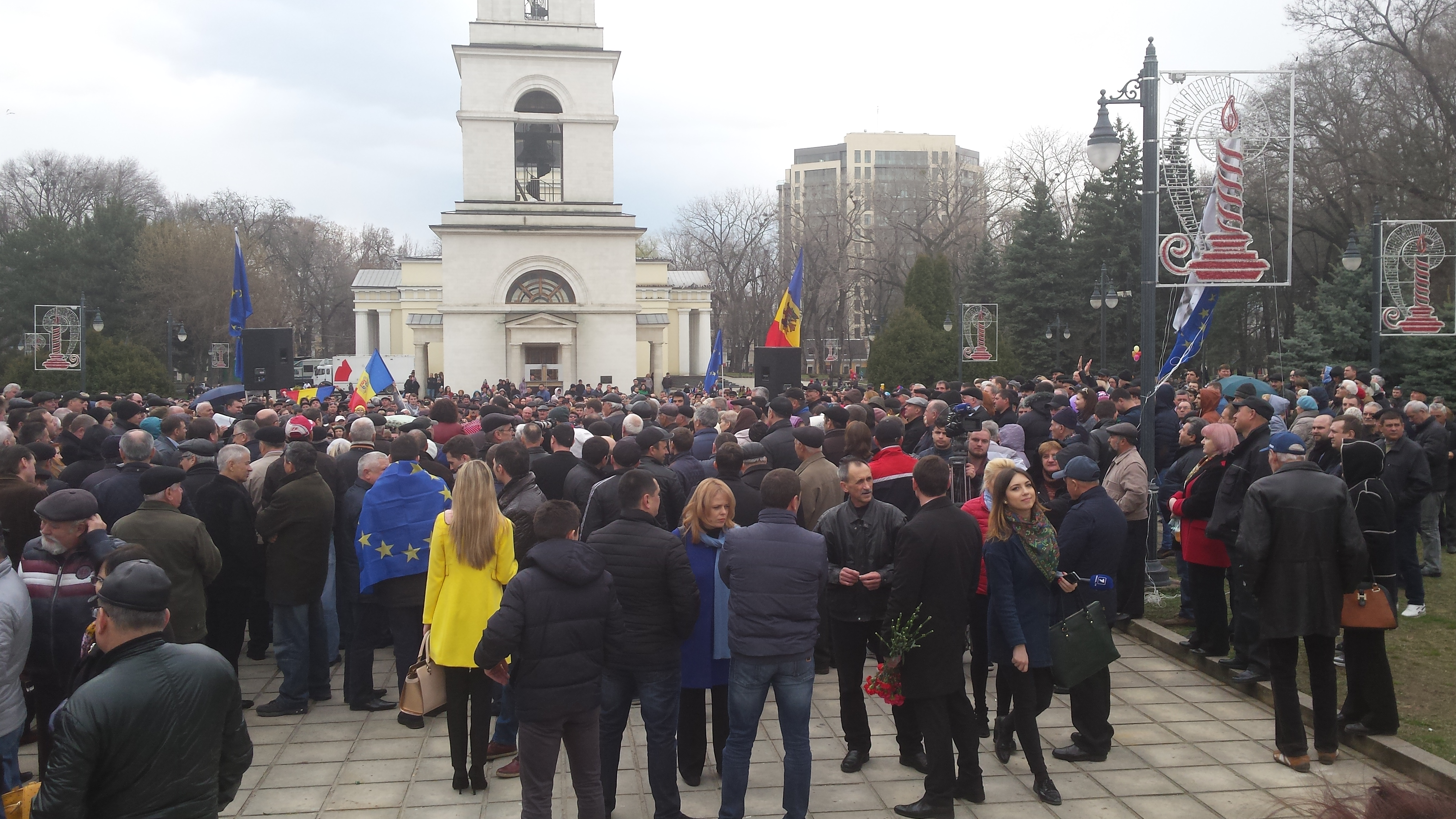
Protest of DA Platform in Chișinău, on 5 April

Tens of thousands of people across the country gathered in downtown Chișinău, at the call of the Dignity and Truth Platform, in an action of protest against the collapse of the financial and banking system, but also against judicial corruption. Demonstrators chanted slogans against the government led by Chiril Gaburici and demanded the unification of Moldova and Romania. Gaburici resigned on 22 June after an investigation into alleged fraud in his educational qualifications and was replaced permanently by Valeriu Streleț on 30 July.

=== 3 May demonstration ===
External media

Images
- Protest rally in the capital's center in pictures on PS News
- Great National Gathering of 6 September on Jurnal.md
- Protest in PMAN in pictures on TeleRadio Moldova

Video
- Popular protest against thieves in government on YouTube
- "Union will take place over the next two years. Are you ready?" on YouTube
- Meeting of 7 June on YouTube
- Anticorruption Protests Surge In Moldova on RFE/RL
- Pictures of the DA protest, coated with drone on Moldova24

On 3 May, up to 50,000 people protested against the Government of Moldova, saying it had failed to implement reforms to bring the country closer to the European Union. Protesters also called on the government to investigate the disappearance of $1 billion (nearly 1/8 of the country's GDP) from the state-owned Savings Bank and the private banks Unibank, Banca de Economii and Banca Socială, in November 2014 before parliamentary elections. The central bank commissioned risk consultancy Kroll to conduct a preliminary investigation into the activities of the three stricken banks. Their findings were confidential but on 4 May parliament speaker Andrian Candu published what he said was Kroll's report on his website. "There appears to have been a deliberate plan to gain control of each of the banks and subsequently manipulate transactions to gain access to credit, whilst giving the appearance to the contrary", the report said. The protest activities were mobilized by the newly founded citizen platform called "Dignity and Truth" – allegedly financed by Viorel and Victor Topa, two exiled businessmen – to which leading personalities in Moldovan civil society belong.

=== Expulsion of George Simion ===
A protest took place on 14 May, in Bucharest, in front of the Embassy of the Republic of Moldova, calling for an "urgent revocation of abusive measures" taken by the Chișinău authorities against Romanian citizen George Simion. The measure was seen as an attempt to intimidate the protest announced for 16 May. Simion had come to Moldova to help organize and take part in the march. He was expelled for five years on 14 May on grounds that his activities could endanger national security. Despite this, more than 25,000 people gathered in Grand National Assembly Square in the largest pro-Romanian manifestation in Chișinău in recent years. Most of the protesters were young people and intellectuals. They demanded the unification of Moldova and Romania and displayed placards with unionist and anti-Russian messages. Demonstrators were joined, among others, by Mayor of Chișinău Dorin Chirtoacă. Column of protesters made several stops in front of the embassies of Romania, Germany, the United States and Russia. Participants at the unionist march voted for the formation of the National Unity Bloc (Romanian: Blocul Unității Naționale), adjoining 22 non-governmental entities, including Youth of Moldova, Action 2012, Association Light of Transnistrian Teachers, Queen Helen Foundation, Children Charity Foundation Sidereal Moment, Association of Former Deportees in USSR, Association Tiras-Bender, etc. The march ended with the signing of a Pact of Union, Pact for Europe.

A bus with 50 members of the Moldovan Youth organization and others who wanted to attend the rally were blocked and legitimated by police in Cahul. Meanwhile, about 40 high school students from Florești were warned by telephone, through parents, by the police that if they participate in demonstrations on 16 May, they would suffer as during the protests of 7 April 2009.

Romanian Prime Minister Victor Ponta conducted a visit to Chișinău on the occasion of Moldovan Independence Day, being greeted by about 200 young men with masks featuring George Simion. "We want to see justice done in the case of George Simion, we want functional justice and we believe that true sovereignty, independence and freedom can only be achieved through union", stated Anatol Ursu, one of the organizers of the flash mob.

After pressure from civil society and Romanian Foreign Minister Bogdan Aurescu, Chișinău Court of Appeal decided, on 18 September, to lift the ban imposed on George Simion.

On 22 September, Romanian and Moldovan governments met in joint session, in Neptun. At the same time, over 300 people gathered outside the building where the meeting was held, demanding unification of Moldova with Romania. Before the meeting began, protesters tried to force the cordon of gendarmes to get closer to the building, and some of them jostled with law enforcers. The heads of the two governments agreed to talk to the unionists.

=== March of Stephen the Great ===
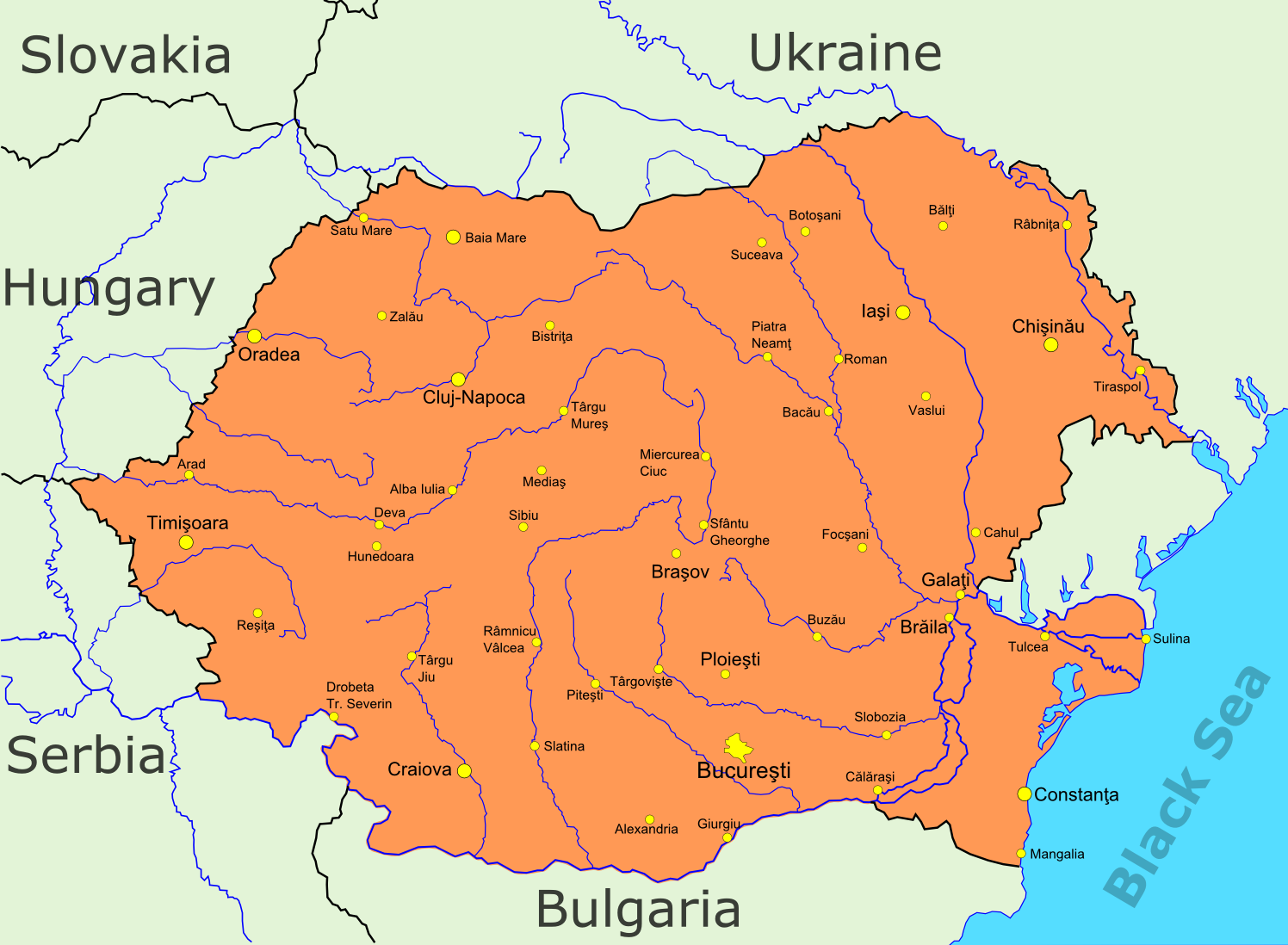
Unified Romania, including Transnistria, as envisaged by unionists

On 5 July 2015, up to 30,000 people, according to organizers, gathered in Grand National Assembly Square, Chișinău, facing Government House and the Monument to the Victims of the Soviet Occupation, to demand the unification of Moldova and Romania. Participants chanted unionist slogans and voted symbolically for a union. Organized by Action 2012 and Youth of Moldova, the manifestation was claimed to be one of the largest in the recent history of Moldova and the fourth great national gathering after those of 27 August 1989 (calling for a restoration of the Latin script), 16 December 1990 (in support of changing the name of the state to Republic of Moldova) and 27 August 1991 (celebrating the proclamation of independence from the USSR). Among participants were present Members of the Romanian Parliament and Moldovans from the Diaspora.

Thousands of young people among the participants in the Great National Gathering headed to Bucharest in the March of Stephen the Great (Romanian: Marșul lui Ștefan cel Mare) calling for the unification of Moldova with Romania. The march lasted a week, from 5 to 11 July. In the Republic of Moldova, the march followed the route Strășeni–Lozova–Călărași–Cornești–Ungheni. Participants crossed the Prut River, on 11 July, at 10 a.m., in a large-scale reenactment of the Bridges of Flowers in 1990. Their march ended in Bucharest, where were greeted by several hundred Romanian citizens in University Square, before making their way to the Cotroceni Palace to call on Romanian President Klaus Iohannis to support the unification project. Former Moldovan President Vladimir Voronin has sharply condemned the march to Romania. In a letter to European Parliament President Martin Schulz, released on 7 July, Voronin accused Bucharest of fomenting "the destruction and annexation of Moldova".

=== Autumn protests ===
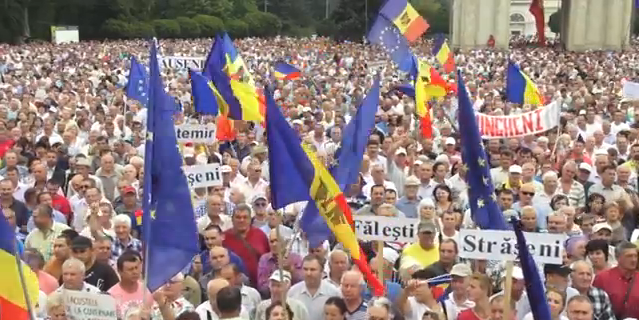
Tens of thousands demonstrating in central Chișinău on 6 September

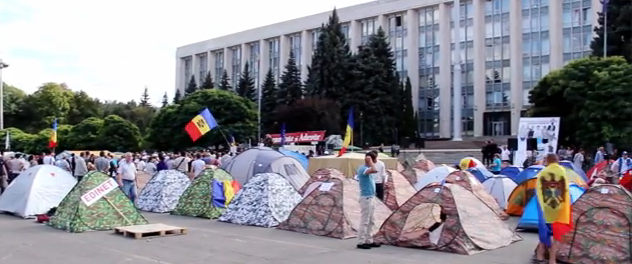
Tents installed in the town of "Dignity and Freedom", as protesters dubbed their encampment in front of PM office.

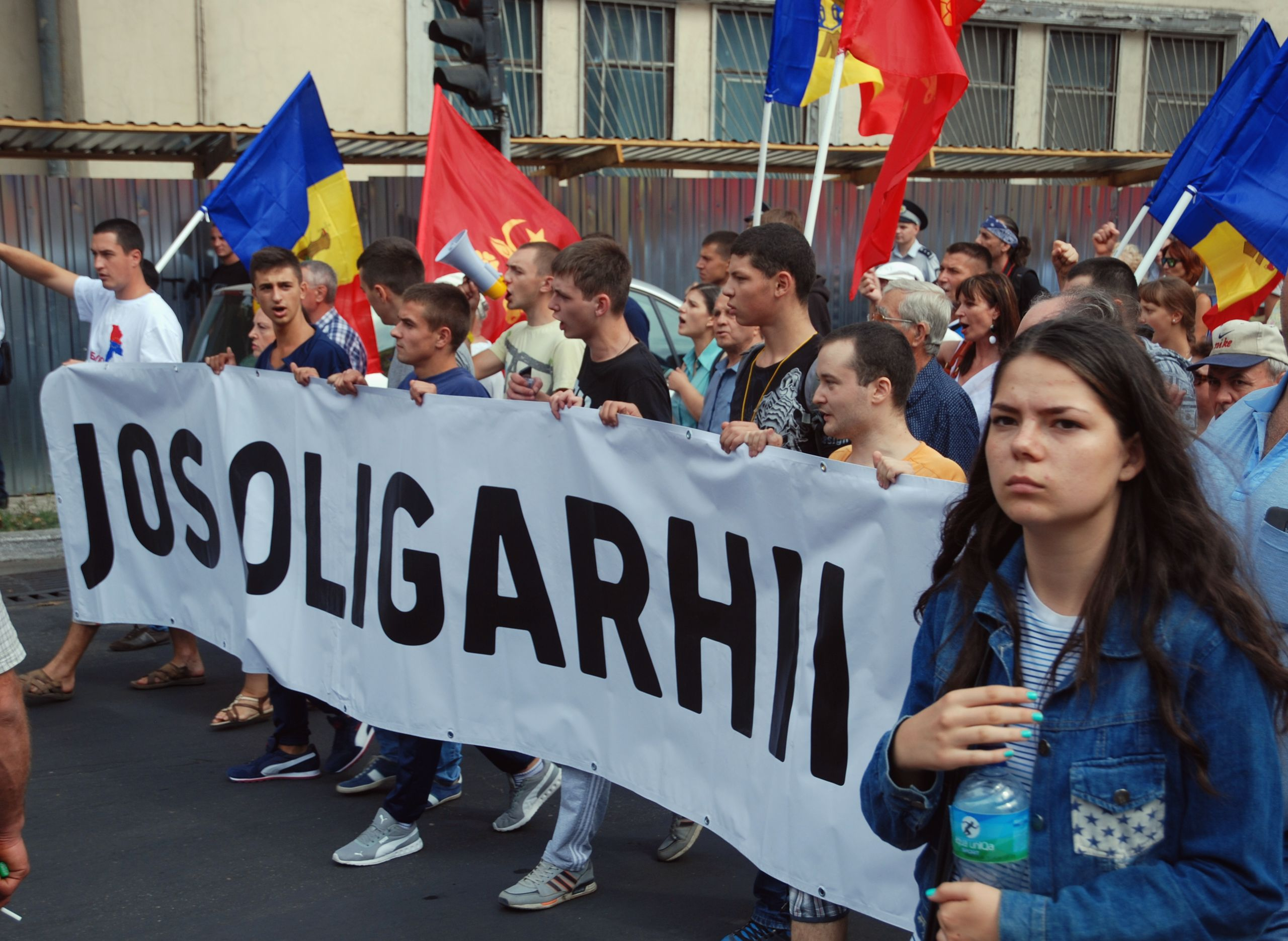
Demonstrators marching with anti-oligarchic banners on Alexander Pushkin Street

Tens of thousands of people manifested in Chișinău at the call of the Justice and Truth Platform. According to police, between 35,000 and 40,000 people attended the demonstration, while organizers estimated around 100,000 participants. The protest was the biggest since Moldova's independence movement in the early 1990s, bigger even than the mass anti-communist protests of April 2009. Participants adopted a resolution demanding early elections, the resignation of President Nicolae Timofti and all leading institutions of law, including the Prosecutor General's office and the National Anticorruption Center.

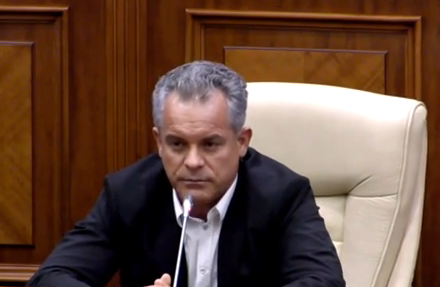
Targeted by protests, Vladimir Plahotniuc, politician and influential businessman, fled the country after the 6 September demonstration.

Clashes broke out with police at the prosecutor general's headquarters, where activists attempted to set up an occupy-style tent encampment. Opposition leaders have accused the prosecutor general of being an instrument of political persecution. Supporters of the radical left Red Bloc Party tried to break the police cordon and forcibly enter the prosecutor's office. Police detained seven activists, including Antifa movement leader, Grigory Petrenko. A team from a local television station in Moldova was accosted by demonstrators. Likewise, six policemen were injured and one woman was hospitalised. According to Interior Minister Oleg Balan, "their scope was to devastate the prosecutor's office". Police removed tents in front of the prosecutor's office. However, more than 90 tents were set up by protesters in Grand National Assembly Square, vowing to continue their protest until demands are met.

Three Russian journalists from the pro-Kremlin television LifeNews were detained at Chișinău International Airport. They were forbidden to enter the Republic of Moldova. The film crew intended to publicize the protests. Russian officials reacted to the arrest of three journalists. "Actions of the new leadership in Chișinău demonstrate their unwillingness to have constructive relations with Russia", stated Maria Zakharova, the official representative of the Russian Foreign Ministry. In the same context, Zakharova mentions that authorities' actions against Russian journalists "violate freedom of speech and access to information".

Prime Minister Valeriu Streleț invited protest organisers to "talks", at the Ministry of Agriculture headquarters, but they announced they will not attend the meeting. A group of representatives of the Platform previously participated in a meeting with Streleț, at the Government headquarters, where they asked him to sign the list of claims, which was presented in the square. Amid the protests against the oligarchic regime, Vladimir Plahotniuc fled Moldova the same day for Geneva.

Concomitantly with the meeting, the Unité phone company, belonging state-owned telco Moldtelecom, announced intentions to organise a free, open air concert, immediately criticised as an attempt to undermine the protest. Under the pressure of comments on social networks, many artists, starting with Ștefan Bănică, Jr., have declined participation, which could be interpreted as a political gesture.

A week later, another major protest took place in Chișinău, attracting 20,000 people from all over Moldova. Clashes between supporters of the Dignity and Justice civic platform and a group advocating Moldova's unification with Romania broke out soon after the rally began. The city centre has been cordoned off and many law enforcers were deployed on the streets. A resolution was adopted at the end of the demonstration, in which protesters call for a general strike and formation of a political movement and a so-called government of popular trust.

On 29 November, another protest organized by DA Platform took place in the Grand National Assembly Square. Demonstrators and supporters of the platform have expressed dissatisfaction with the political and economic situation in the country and called for early elections. To ensure security, hundreds of police formed two cordons in front of the Government. During the protest, DA Platform representatives said they will create a political party. Protests also took place in Bălți, Orhei, Cahul, Hîncești, Ungheni and Soroca.

Founding members of the Civic Platform Dignity and Truth
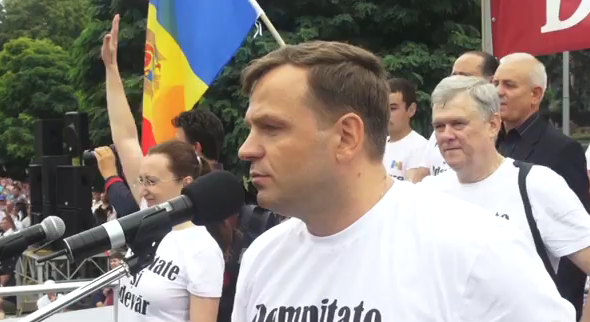
Andrei Năstase

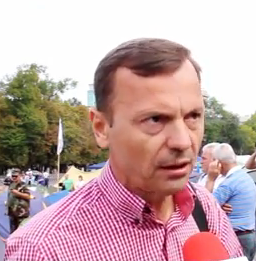
Vasile Năstase

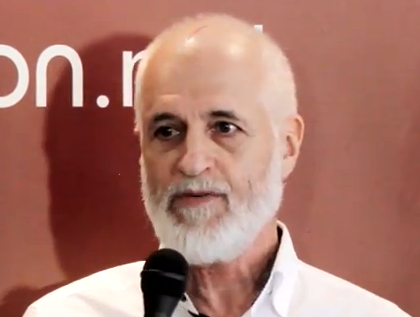
Valentin Dolganiuc

=== Political crisis ===
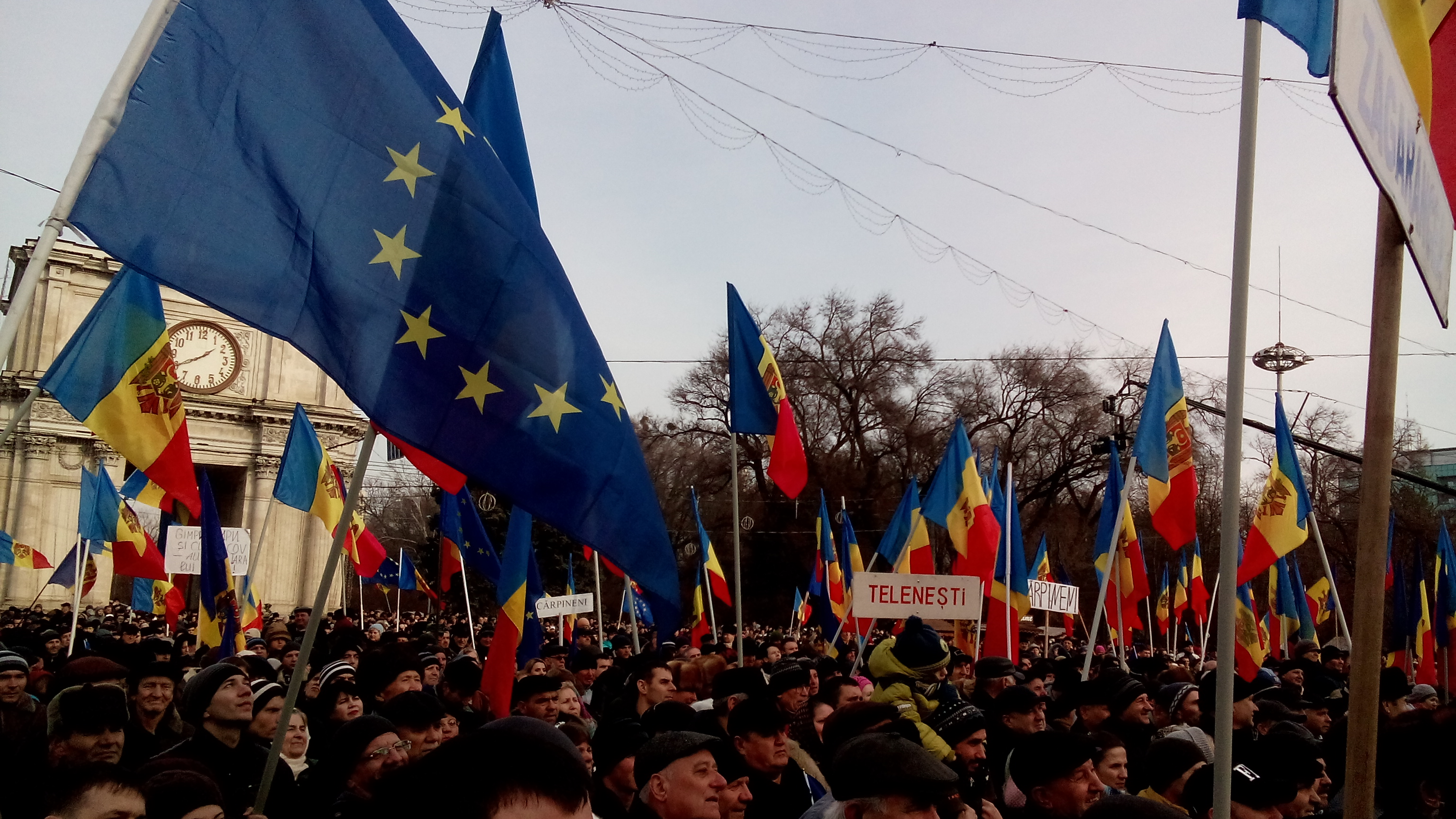
Protests in the wake of 2016 political crisis

On 13 January 2016, 56 deputies of the parliamentary coalition formed around PD proposed controversial businessman Vlad Plahotniuc for the position of prime minister. The proposal was immediately rejected by President Nicolae Timofti, invoking integrity reasons. Timofti asked coalition representatives to propose another name until 14 January at 12 a.m. In the evening of 13 January, the coalition announced that will propose again Plahotniuc, thus escalating the constitutional conflict. The same day, two rallies took place in Chișinău, one that supports Vlad Plahotniuc for the position of prime minister and another that opposes the nomination. Next day, protests continued, with tens of thousands of people demonstrating in central Chișinău against Plahotniuc. By night, Timofti nominated the Secretary General of the Presidency, Ion Păduraru, candidate for this position, defying PD's proposal. However, Ion Păduraru announced his withdrawal from the race in less than 24 hours after the announcement of his nomination. He justified his gesture by the fact that the parliamentary majority has already nominated another proposal of premier, and President Timofti will consider it as a compromise solution. On 16 January, the parliamentary coalition grouped around the Democratic Party of Vlad Plahotniuc announced that disagrees with the proposal of President Timofti and came up with a new proposal for premier, instead of Plahotniuc – Pavel Filip. Later that day, up to 20,000 people joined three different rallies that were organized by both the left Socialist Party of Moldova and the centre-right Civic Platform DA. The protesters called on the Moldovan president and chief prosecutor to resign, demanding early elections and prompt measures against corruption. They also opposed the nomination of Pavel Filip to the post of Prime Minister.

On 20 January, a majority of 57 MPs voted in favor of PD-backed Pavel Filip Government. During the parliamentary meeting, the Parliament building was surrounded by about 1,000 protesters that demanded the interruption of the vote. They broke a side door of the Parliament and entered the building, forcing the cordon of gendarmes. Many gendarmes offered no resistance, being dragged out of the device and giving up shields and batons. After several hours, police intervened in force, removing the protesters from the Parliament and cordoning the building off. 15 people, six protesters and nine gendarmes, suffered contusions after confrontations at Parliament. One of them was President of the Liberal Party, Mihai Ghimpu, who had his head broken, being hit by protesters while leaving the Parliament.

=== Renewed protests ===
Thousands of people calling for Moldova's reunification with Romania took to the streets of Chișinău on 27 March in a so-called "march of reunion". The rally organizers say some 50,000 people took part in the protests while police put the number at 5,000–6,000 people. The rally was meant to mark the 98th anniversary since Bessarabia was unified with the Kingdom of Romania on 27 March 1918. A bomb alert was triggered at Nicolae Sulac National Palace, during the formation of platform Sfatul Țării 2, that brings together the unionist organizations in Moldova fighting for the unification with Romania. Sappers and firefighters were deployed on the spot, but found that the alarm was false. Representatives of Voievod Movement held a counter manifestation. They were surrounded by law enforcers in order to avoid the degeneration of the situation.

==== 2017 ====
On 11 June 2017 a new protest took place at Chișinău: around 4.000 citizens took part at a protest against adopting a law of mixed voting system, promoted by the Democratic Party of Moldova, seen by the Venice Commission and European rights experts as inappropriate for Moldova. On 17 September 2017 a new protest took place: the protesters have manifested again against the mixed voting system. In 2018, a popular movement rocked the country. Police clashed with demonstrators staging sit-ins and Rallies from June-August demanded the resignation of Igor Dodon and an end to corruption.

== Aftermath ==
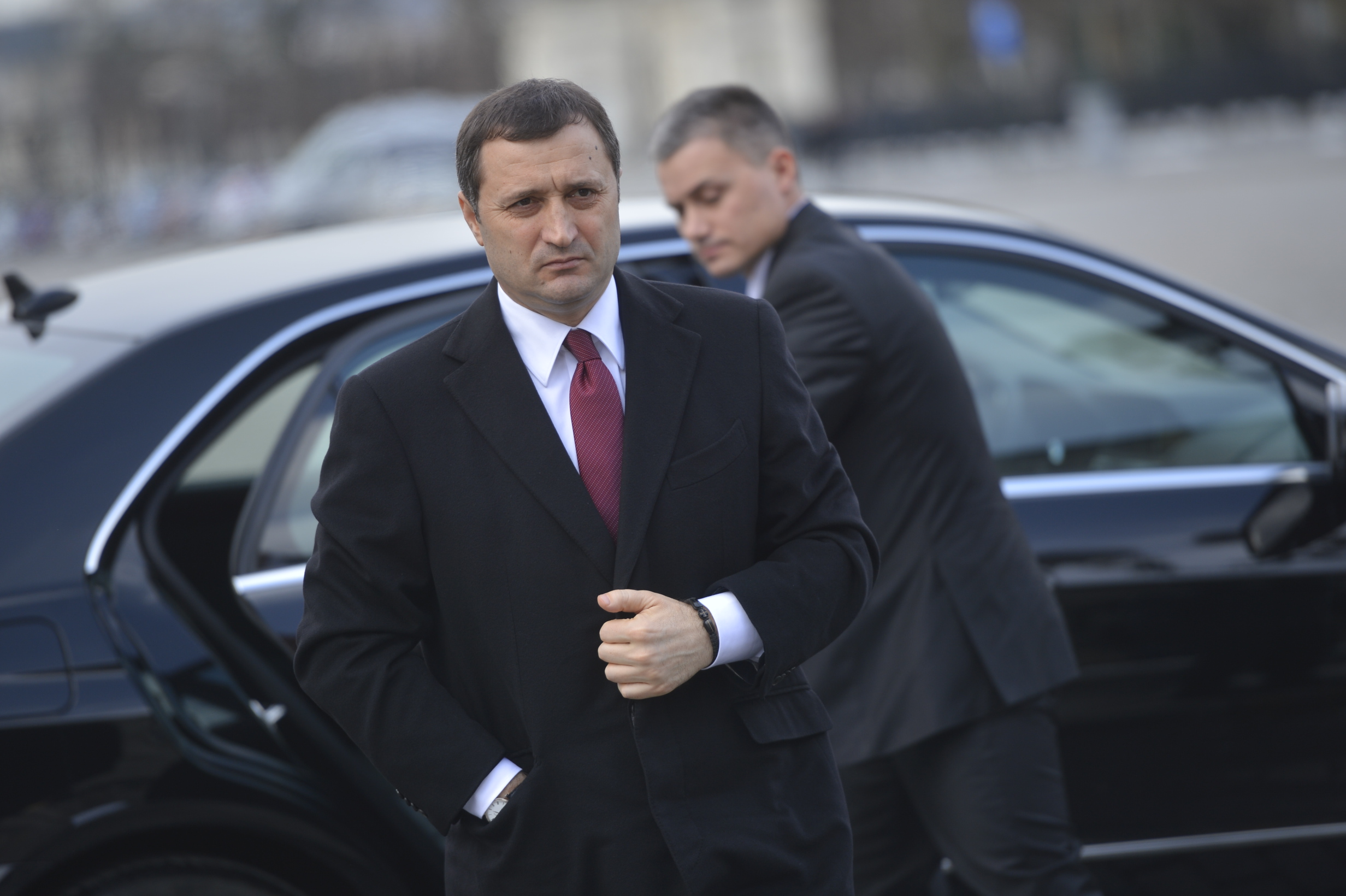
Former PM and leader of PLDM, Vlad Filat, was arrested on 15 October for involvement in the 2014 Moldovan bank fraud scandal.

Former prime minister Vlad Filat, leader of the Liberal Democratic Party of Moldova, was detained in parliament on 15 October over the theft of $1 billion from the banking system. Masked officers entered the Moldovan parliament to handcuff and arrest Filat, while anti-government protesters had blocked the exits to the building for most of the day to prevent him leaving. Moments earlier, the lawmakers voted to strip Filat of his parliamentary immunity. Vlad Filat is accused of passive corruption and influence peddling. He would preted bribe €250 million from Ilan Shor to determine legislative decisions to diminish the position of the Moldovan state in the Savings Bank. Ilan Shor, Mayor of Orhei, is also accused in the "Robbery of the century" corruption case, that is, the 2014 Moldovan bank fraud scandal.

On 16 October, the National Bank of Moldova has withdrawn the licenses of financial activity for Savings Bank, Social Bank and Unibank. Thus has begun the process of liquidation thereof.

On 29 October, three months after formation, the Streleț government was dismissed through a motion of censure, voted in favour by 65 MPs. The government's dismissal was enacted through the votes of the Socialist, Communist, and Democratic Party deputies. The stated reason underlying the motion was "suspicion of the corruption of Prime Minister Valeriu Streleț". Soon after the vote, the Romanian Ministry of Foreign Affairs reacted, saying that stability of government should be allowed to prevail and the pro-European mandate given in the results of the November 2014 elections should be executed.

== Reactions ==
=== Domestic ===
Igor Dodon, leader of the country's largest opposition party, the influential Moscow-friendly Socialist Party, has denounced the government's silence toward what he described as "officials and representatives of right-wing extremist, nationalist and "neo-Nazi" groups from Romania who attended the 5 July gathering.

After a first meeting with the leaders of the protesters, Moldovan PM Valeriu Streleț stated that his government would resign only in case of a no-confidence vote in Parliament. In a message published on the Presidency page, Nicolae Timofti cataloged the 6 September demonstration as a democratic exercise. As for his resignation, Timofti said he won't resign because "such a decision would bring instability to the Republic of Moldova".

According to Dorin Chirtoacă, Mayor of Chișinău, pressure from society must exist, but organizers of protests should correctly calculate their forces and actions. He also stated that eventual early elections would further destabilize the situation in Moldova. A similar position was adopted by Moldova's parliament speaker, Andrian Candu, saying such a move would leave the country stuck in economic crisis. During the September protests, Dorin Chirtoacă has called for the tents to be removed from the central boulevard and claimed that not only is the protest illegal, but that it is being fomented by Moscow. He has claimed that Renato Usatîi and Igor Dodon are puppets of Vladimir Putin.

=== International ===
==== Official reactions ====
===== Supranational organisations =====
- In response to the 2014 Moldovan bank fraud scandal, the EU, International Monetary Fund and World Bank have frozen their financial assistance to Moldova.
- (United Nations) UN High Commissioner for Human Rights, Zeid Ra'ad Al-Hussein, has called on authorities in Moldova to address the demands of protesters, warning that a failure to do so "could lead to greater polarization of society".

===== States =====
- Romanian Prime Minister Victor Ponta expressed his concern about the situation in Moldova, that, in his opinion, is "worse than last year", but says that he supports his counterpart in Chișinău and Moldova's European course. Ponta is a vocal supporter of Romania's reunification. In September 2014, he gave a speech at Alba Iulia, stating that "my commitment is to jointly make a second Great Union of Romania". During a meeting of the Presidents of Romania and Moldova in Suceava, Klaus Iohannis stated that "people on both sides of the Prut" will be found in one day not only in the EU, but also "in communion", adding that "we will be there for Moldovan citizens no matter how much effort we have to exert and how much will last".

On 26 January 2016, the Government of Romania offered a €60 million loan to help stave off economic collapse. To get the money, Prime Minister Dacian Cioloș said Moldova will have to reform its justice system, fight corruption, sign a draft agreement for a loan from the International Monetary Fund and appoint a new central bank governor.

- According to the United States Embassy in Chișinău, protests highlight the frustration experienced by many Moldovans due to lack of reforms in their country. American diplomats support the right of citizens to protest peacefully, urging Moldova's Government to quickly implement the necessary reforms, such as expanding anti-corruption efforts.

==== Others ====
- (United States) According to Stratfor, protests could threaten the stability of Moldova's fragile government. Consequently, the possible weakening or collapse of the Moldovan government "could slow Moldova's European integration". A similar analysis from Stratfor shows that "the recent rallies and the positive reaction from top Romanian officials are signs of increasing Romanian influence in Moldova".
- (Georgia (country)) / Former Georgian President Mikheil Saakashvili, now Governor of Ukrainian Odesa Oblast, considers that protests taking place in Chișinău are "an anti-oligarchic movement which answers Ukraine's aspirations". "It is known that, in recent years, Moldovan oligarchs began to control everything. They control all state bodies, most of the Parliament and almost entirely the premier. When former prime minister [Chiril Gaburici] tried to change something, was immediately put on the table a file with compromising materials. This is a typical oligarchic style", concluded Saakashvili. Likewise, Saakashvili deems "the people come out on street to protest against oligarchs, but not in the favor of Russia. I think that the whole population of the Republic of Moldova is for Europe, and among youth it is an absolute majority".
- (Russia) In an article published by the news agency RIA Novosti, President of the Center for Systematic Analysis and Forecasting in Moscow, Rostislav Ishchenko, says that events in the Republic of Moldova remind of the "orange" scenario. According to the author, all "colored" coups were organized and guided by the United States, and the embassies were coordination centres for protesters, scenario also "applied" in Moldova. Moreover, Russian analyst writes that "rumors that make connections between protesters and EU, particularly Germany, country from where would be financed the DJ Platform, are identical to those linking the protests in Kyiv and financiers in Germany".

== See also ==
- April 2009 Moldovan parliamentary election protests
- 2013 Pro Europe demonstration in Moldova
- 2023 European Moldova National Assembly
- 2002 Moldovan protests
