= Snegur =

Snegur (Russian: Снегур) is a surname. It is a cognate of the Ukrainian surname Snihur/Snigur, meaning "bullfinch" (Pyrrhula). Notable people with the surname include:

- Georgeta Snegur (1937–2019), First Lady of Moldova, wife of Mircea
- Mircea Snegur (1939–2023), first President of Moldova
- Natalia Snegur-Gherman (born 1969), Moldovan politician, daughter of Mircea

== See also ==
- Snihur, a related surname
