= Victims of Communism Memorial (disambiguation) =

The Victims of Communism Memorial is a memorial in Washington, D.C. It may also refer to:

- Victims of Communism Memorial, another name for two monuments in Chișinău, Moldova:
  - Memorial to Victims of Stalinist Repression
  - Monument to the Victims of the Soviet Occupation
- Memorial to the Victims of Communism in Prague, Czech Republic
- Memorial to the Victims of Communism – Canada, a Land of Refuge, a memorial under construction in Ottawa, Canada
- Victims of Communism 1940–1991 Memorial in Tallinn, Estonia
- Twelve Responses to Tragedy, a memorial in London, United Kingdom, to victims of Communism

== See also ==
- Victims of Communism Memorial Foundation, an organization in the United States that oversaw the construction of the Washington D.C. memorial
- Crimes against humanity under communist regimes
- Soviet and communist studies
- Comparison of Nazism and Stalinism
- Double genocide theory
- Mass killings under communist regimes
