= Ghimpu =

Ghimpu is a Romanian surname that may refer to one of three brothers from Moldova:

- Gheorghe Ghimpu (1937–2000), Romanian politician and political prisoner
- Mihai Ghimpu (born 1951), Moldovan politician
- Simion Ghimpu (1939–2010), Moldovan writer
- Dina Ghimpu (born 1957)
