= First Lady of Moldova =

- Romanian: Prima Doamnă a Republicii Moldova
- The Flag of Moldova
- Residence: Presidential Palace
- Precursor: Spouse of the Chairmen of the Supreme Soviet of the Moldavian SSR
- Inaugural holder: Georgeta Snegur
- Formation: 3 September 1990

First Lady of Moldova (Romanian: Prima Doamnă a Republicii Moldova) is an informal title applied to the wife of the President of Moldova.

== First ladies of Moldova (since 1991) ==
No.	Photo	Name	President	Term begins	Term ends	Notes
1		Georgeta Snegur	Mircea Snegur	3 September 1990	15 January 1997	
2		Antonina Lucinschi	Petru Lucinschi	15 January 1997	7 April 2001	
3		Taisia Voronin	Vladimir Voronin	7 April 2001	11 September 2009	
4		Dina Ghimpu	Mihai Ghimpu (acting	11 September 2009	28 December 2010	
–		Sanda Filat	Vlad Filat (acting)	28 December 2010	30 December 2010	
–		Victoria Lupu	Marian Lupu (acting)	30 December 2010	23 March 2012	
5		Margareta Timofti	Nicolae Timofti	23 March 2012	23 December 2016	
6		Galina Dodon	Igor Dodon	23 December 2016	24 December 2020	n
–			Maia Sandu	24 December 2020	present	
