= Molovata =

- Village
- Location within Moldova
- Coordinates: 47°20′56″N 29°6′52″E
- Country: Moldova

Government
  - Mayor: Isac Ilie (Independent)
- Elevation: 67 m (220 ft)

Population (2014 census)
  - Total: 2,556
- Time zone: UTC+2 (EET)
  - Summer (DST): UTC+3 (EEST)
- Postal code: MD-4577

Molovata is a village in Dubăsari District, Moldova.

== Notable people ==
- Galina Dodon (born 1977), First Lady of Moldova
