= Honorary Badge of the Commonwealth of Independent States =

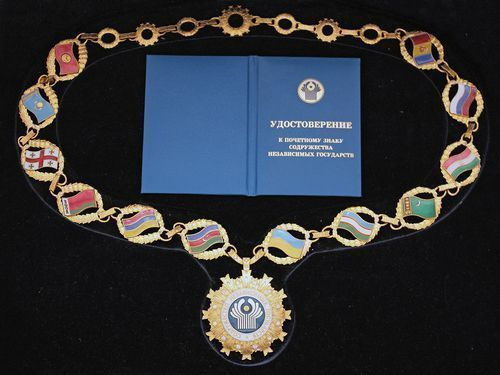
- Native name: Почётный знак Содружества Независимых Государств
- Type: Intergovernmental decoration
- Presented by: Council of Heads of State of the CIS
- Status: Active
- Established: October 7, 2002
- First award: June 1, 2001

The Honorary Badge of the Commonwealth of Independent States (Russian: Почётный знак Содружества Независимых Государств) is the highest regional intergovernmental decoration awarded by the Commonwealth of Independent States (CIS). Established on October 7, 2002, the decoration is conferred upon heads of state, heads of government, and prominent public figures. The award was officially established during a session of the Council of Heads of State on October 7, 2002 in Chișinău, Moldova, which is a former member state. The visual composition of the badge directly integrates the formal state symbols of the CIS, the central element depicts the official Emblem of the Commonwealth of Independent States, and the chain depicts the flags of members states.

== Notable Recipients ==
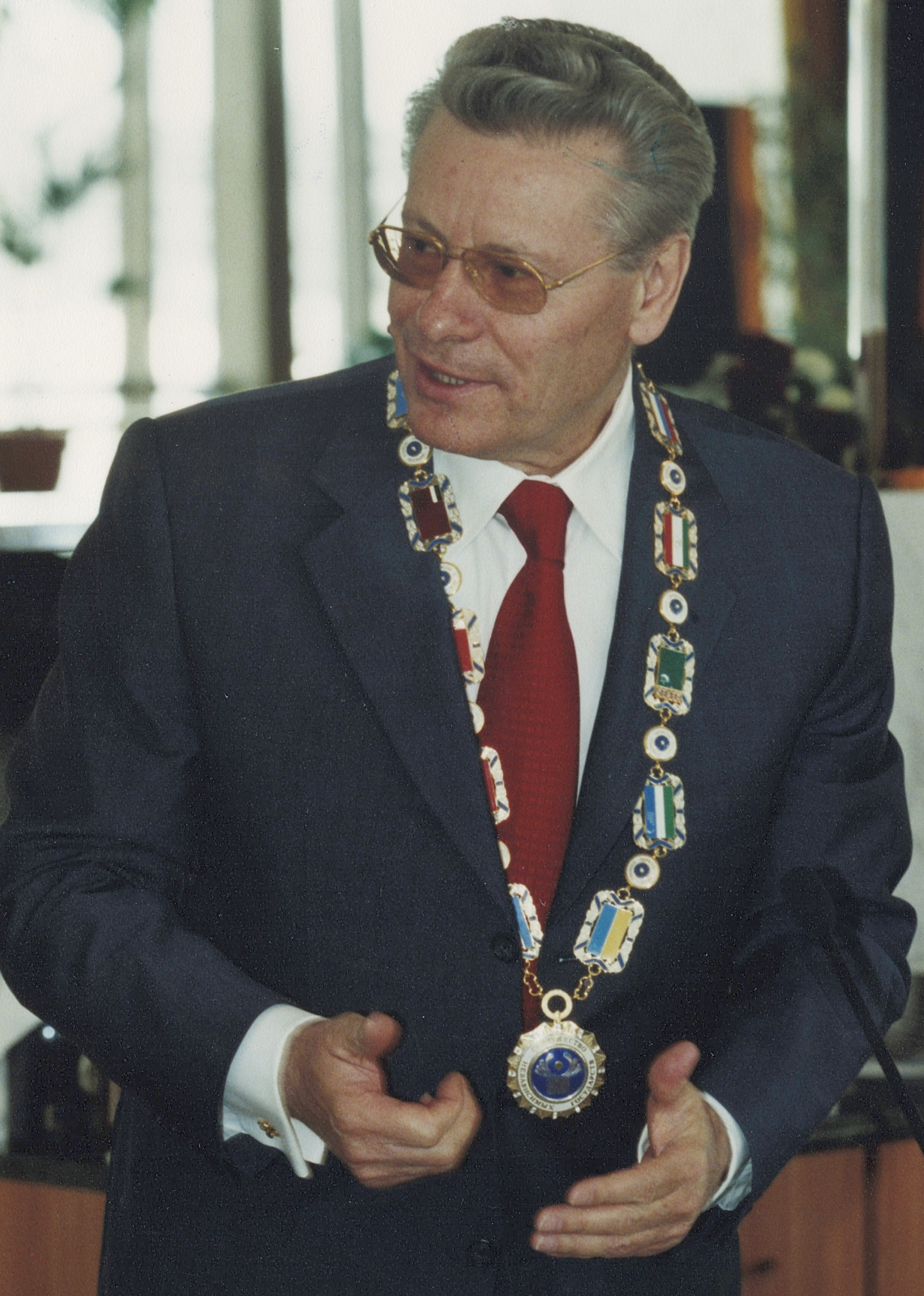
Petru Lucinschi being awarded the CIS Honorary Badge.

Notable recipients include:

- Petru Lucinschi, President of Moldova (June 1, 2001)
- Boris Yeltsin, 1st President of Russia (2002)
- Vladimir Putin, President of Russia (October 7, 2002)
- Heydar Aliyev, President of Azerbaijan (May 30, 2003)
- Leonid Kuchma, President of Ukraine (September 16, 2004)
- Yuri Yarov, CIS Executive Secretary (September 16, 2004)
- Emomali Rahmon, President of Tajikistan (October 5, 2007)
- Vladimir Rushailo, CIS Executive Secretary (October 5, 2007)
- Robert Kocharyan, President of Armenia (February 22, 2008)
- Shavkat Mirziyoyev (October 13, 2023)
