= Chiril Lucinschi =

Moldovan politician and businessman

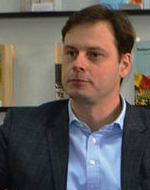
- Lucinschi in 2015

Member of the Moldovan Parliament
- In office 24 December 2010 – 22 February 2017
- Succeeded by: Alexandru Barbăroșie
- Parliamentary group: Liberal Democratic Party

Personal details
- Born: 14 November 1970 (age 55) Chișinău, Moldavian SSR, Soviet Union
- Party: Liberal Democratic Party of Moldova (2012–2017); Democratic Party of Moldova (2009–2012)
- Spouse: Anna Lucinschi
- Children: 4
- Parent(s): Petru Lucinschi; Antonina Lucinschi
- Occupation: Politician, businessman, diplomat

Chiril Lucinschi (Romanian pronunciation: [kiˈril luˈtʃinski]; born 14 November 1970) is a Moldovan politician and businessman who served as member of the Parliament of Moldova from December 2010 to February 2017, representing the Liberal Democratic Party of Moldova. He was also a professional basketball player, being President of the Basketball Federation of Moldova between 1999 and 2004. He is son of the second President of Moldova, Petru Lucinschi.

== Biography ==
Between 2004 and 2008, he was deputy president of National Olympic Committee of Moldova.

Lucinschi is the President of directors board of AnaliticMedia-Grup S.A., and is owner of two TV channels – TV8 and ТНТ Bravo – Moldova.

On 22 February 2017, Lucinschi announced that he would drop his MP mandate and leave the Liberal Democratic Party.

On 25 May 2017, Lucinschi was detained by Anti-Corruption prosecutors, being suspected of involvement in the 2014 Moldovan bank fraud scandal. He stated that he was not guilty. On 27 May Lucinschi was placed under home arrest for 30 days, this term being prolonged for another 30 days on 24 June, and one more time on 20 July. On 1 August 2017, the Anti-Corruption Prosecution Office completed the criminal investigation and filed the Lucinschi case to trial. According to the Prosecution Office press release, a company of which Lucinschi is a beneficiary got a loan of 5 million lei from the later-failed Moldovan bank Unibank in 2013, and then transferred $401,650 to a company group out of the country, and finally, to the accounts of Rouseau Alliance LP, which consequently paid back the loan to later-failed Banca de Economii (BEM). Moreover, during 2012–2014, several offshore companies transferred some $440,000 to IPA International Project Agency. It was reportedly proven later that the funds originated from the fraudulent loans from BEM, Unibank and Banca Socială through offshore firms. According to the prosecutors Lucinschi risked up to 10 years of imprisonment for alleged money laundering and not declaring ownership.
