= Mircea Snegur =

President of Moldova from 1990 to 1997

Mircea Snegur OR
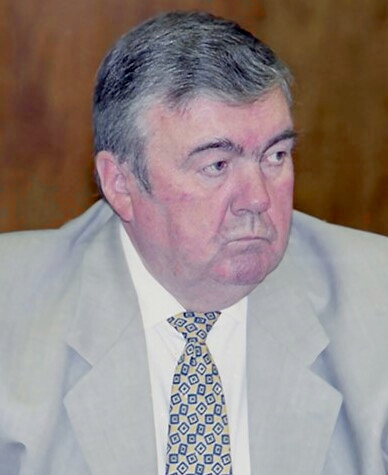
- Snegur in 1996

1st President of Moldova
- In office 3 September 1990 – 15 January 1997
- Prime Minister: Mircea Druc; Valeriu Muravschi; Andrei Sangheli
- Succeeded by: Petru Lucinschi

Member of the Moldovan Parliament
- In office 21 April 1998 – 20 March 2001
- Parliamentary group: Democratic Convention
- In office 17 April 1990 – 3 September 1990
- Constituency: Nisporeni

Chairman of the Supreme Soviet of SSR Moldova
- In office 27 April 1990 – 3 September 1990
- Premier: Petru Pascari; Mircea Druc
- Preceded by: Ion Ciobanu
- Succeeded by: Alexandru Moșanu

Chairman of the Presidium of the Supreme Soviet of the Moldavian SSR
- In office 29 July 1989 – 17 April 1990
- Premier: Ivan Calin; Petru Pascari
- Preceded by: Alexandru Mocanu

People's Deputy of the Soviet Union
- In office 26 March 1989 – 29 July 1989
- Constituency: Soroca

Personal details
- Born: 17 January 1940 Trifănești, Kingdom of Romania
- Died: 13 September 2023 (aged 83) Chișinău, Moldova
- Resting place: Chișinău Central Cemetery
- Party: Independent
- Other political affiliations: PRCM (1995–2002); PCM (1964–1990)
- Spouse: Georgeta Snegur (m. 1960; died 2019)
- Children: 2, including Natalia Gherman
- Education: State Agrarian University of Moldova
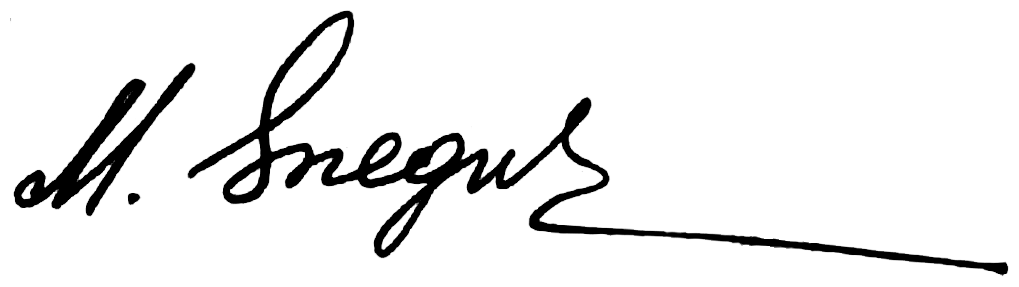
- Signature

Mircea Snegur (Romanian: [ˈmirtʃe̯a ˈsneɡur]; 17 January 1940 – 13 September 2023) was a Moldovan agronomist and politician who served as the first President of Moldova from 1990 to 1997. Prior to that, he served as the Chairman of the Presidium of the Supreme Soviet of the Moldavian SSR from 1989 to 1990 and chairman of the Supreme Soviet from 27 April to 3 September 1990.

== Early life and education ==
Snegur was born on 17 January 1940 in Trifănești, then Kingdom of Romania. In 1957, Snegur graduated from the high school in Frumușica, Florești District, and went on to study at the Agricultural State University of Moldova, from which he graduated in 1961, and where he completed a PhD in agricultural sciences at the university's Department of Animal Husbandry in 1972.

== Professional career ==
As a trained agronomist, Snegur worked as the director of kolkhoz in the village of Lunga, Florești District, from 1961 to 1968. From 1968 to 1973, he was the director of the Experimental Station of Field Crops. From 1973 to 1978, Snegur was the director of the Main Agricultural Science Directorate of the Ministry of Agriculture. From 1978 to 1981, he worked as the general director of the Selectia Research Institute of Field Crops in Bălți.

== Early political career ==
Snegur was a member of the Communist Party of Moldova from 1964 until 1990.

In 1981, he became the secretary of the Communist Party committee of Edineț District, an office he held until 1985. That year, he became Secretary of the Central Committee of the Communist Party, serving until 1989. On 26 March 1989 Snegur was elected member of the Supreme Soviet of the Soviet Union in the 11th and 12th convocations.

On 29 July 1989, Snegur was appointed Chairman of the Presidium of the Supreme Soviet of Moldavia, serving in this role until 27 April 1990. During his term, he supported the bill to make Moldovan the official language and the return of the tricolor flag of Moldova. On 27 April, he became the chairman of the Supreme Soviet of Moldavian SSR. On 3 September, he became President of the Moldavian SSR.

== Presidency (1991–1997) ==
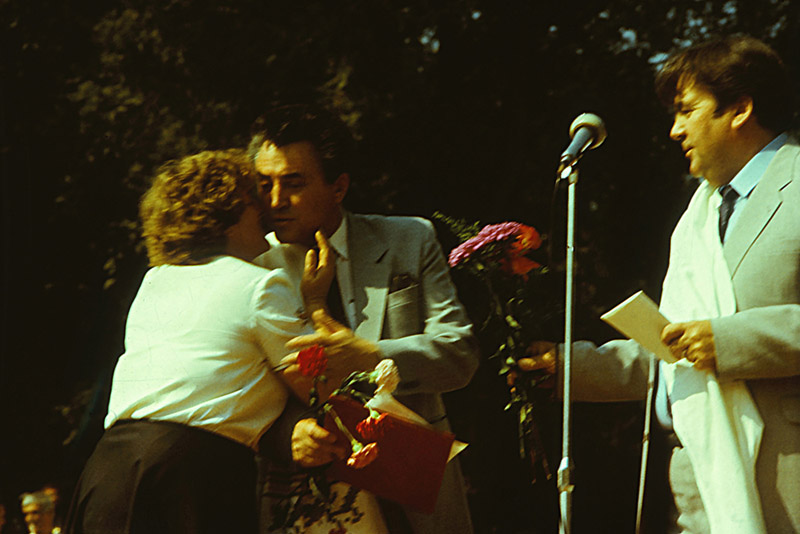
Snegur (right) with mayor of Chișinău Nicolae Costin in 1991

On 23 May 1991, Snegur became the president of the Republic of Moldova, still a constituent republic of the USSR. On 27 August 1991, Moldova declared its independence from the Soviet Union and Snegur became the first president of Moldova as an independent state. Snegur decided to run as an independent candidate in the December 1991 presidential election, running unopposed after the Popular Front's efforts to organize a voter boycott failed.

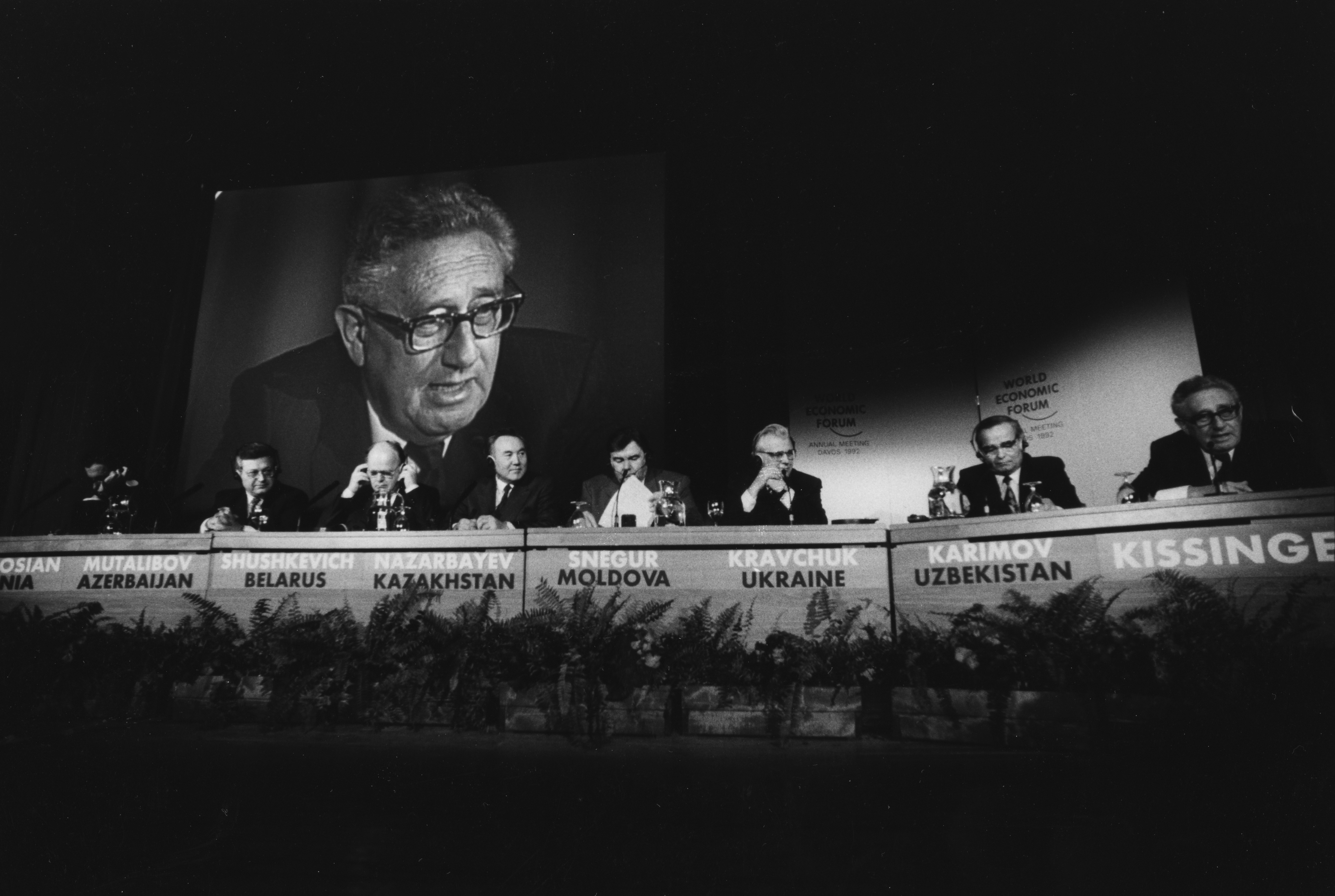
Snegur (center) in the 1992 World Economic Forum

On 3 September 1991, Snegur created the National Army of Moldova. In December 1991, Snegur signed the act that made Moldova a full member of the Commonwealth of Independent States (CIS), and on 2 March 1992, Moldova became a member of the United Nations. In July, Snegur signed with Russian president Boris Yeltsin a treaty to mark the end of the Transnistrian War. On 29 June 1994, a new Constitution of Moldova was adopted, and on 26 June 1995, Moldova was admitted as a member of the Council of Europe.

=== Unification with Romania ===
In an address to the Parliament of Romania in February 1991, Snegur spoke of a common identity of Moldovans and Romanians, referring to the "Romanians of both sides of the Prut River". Despite this Snegur proved to be opposed to immediate reunification with Romania, which led to a split with the Popular Front of Moldova in October 1991. He instead sported the idea of a political union that would keep the political sovereignty of each state whilst engaging in economic and military cooperation (known as the "one people, two States" plan).

=== Later years of presidency (1995–1997) ===
In 1995, Snegur founded the Party of Rebirth and Conciliation of Moldova with former members of the Agrarian Party of Moldova. Snegur ran as the Party of Rebirth and Conciliation's candidate in the 1996 presidential election, where he won a plurality, but not a majority, of votes in the first round. However, Parliamentary speaker Petru Lucinschi surprised the nation with an upset victory over Snegur in the second round. Snegur continued as President until 15 January 1997.

He published his memoirs in the book "Labyrinth of Destiny: memoirs" in 2007.

== Personal life and death ==
In 1960, he married Georgeta Snegur (23 April 1937 – 23 December 2019) and had a son and a daughter, Natalia Gherman, who was acting prime minister of Moldova in 2015.

Snegur died on 13 September 2023, at the age of 83. President Maia Sandu declared mourning day for 16 September with a nationwide minute of silence at 12:00 PM. The state funeral took place on 16 September, with an early memorial service in the Nativity Cathedral of Chișinău and the coffin was laid to rest at the Palace of the Republic, from where the funeral procession left, passing through Great National Assembly Square until arriving at the Central Cemetery, where he was buried.

== Honours and awards ==
- (Soviet Union) Order of the Badge of Honour (1966)
- (Soviet Union) Medal "For Labour Valour" (1976)
- Diploma of the European Academy of Arts (1995)
- Diploma of Honour and Gold Medal of the European Order of Merit (1995)
- Doctor honoris causa from the State Agrarian University of Moldova (1996)
- Doctor honoris causa from the Ankara University (1996)
- (Moldova) Order of the Republic (2000)
- Doctor honoris causa from the Free International University of Moldova (2001)
- Order for Merits to Lithuania (2007)
- Doctor honoris causa from the Academy of Sciences of Moldova (2011)

Political offices
Preceded by formation of republic	President of the Republic of Moldova; 1990–1997	Succeeded by Petru Lucinschi
