= Petru Lucinschi =

President of Moldova from 1997 to 2001

Petru Lucinschi OR
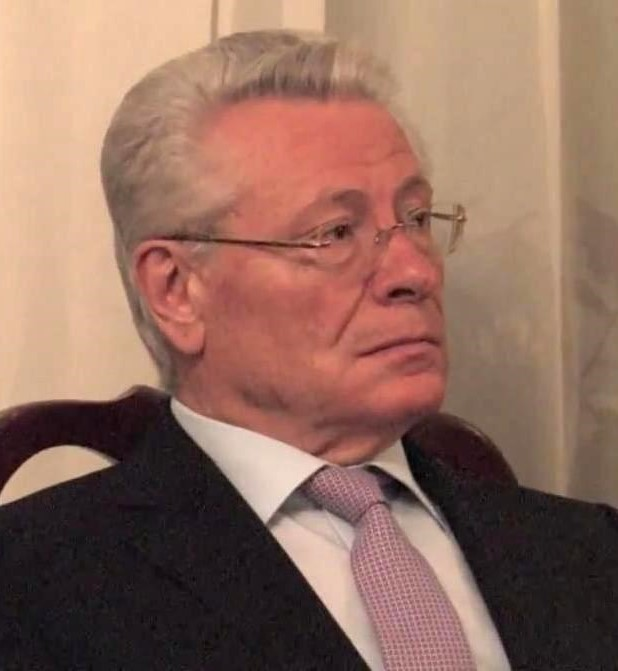
- Lucinschi in 2012

2nd President of Moldova
- In office 15 January 1997 – 7 April 2001
- Prime Minister: Andrei Sangheli; Ion Ciubuc; Ion Sturza; Dumitru Braghiş
- Preceded by: Mircea Snegur
- Succeeded by: Vladimir Voronin

2nd President of the Moldovan Parliament
- In office 4 February 1993 – 9 January 1997
- President: Mircea Snegur
- Prime Minister: Andrei Sangheli
- Deputy: Dumitru Moțpan; Nicolae Andronic; Dumitru Diacov
- Preceded by: Alexandru Moșanu
- Succeeded by: Dumitru Moțpan

Member of the Moldovan Parliament
- In office 17 April 1990 – 9 January 1997
- Succeeded by: Petru Agachi
- Parliamentary group: Democratic Agrarian Party
- Constituency: Briceni

1st Moldovan Ambassador to Russia
- In office 6 April 1992 – 3 February 1993
- President: Mircea Snegur
- Prime Minister: Valeriu Muravschi; Andrei Sangheli
- Succeeded by: Anatol Țăranu

First Secretary of the Moldavian Communist Party
- In office 16 November 1989 – 4 February 1991
- Premier: Ivan Calin; Petru Pascari; Mircea Druc
- Preceded by: Semion Grossu
- Succeeded by: Grigore Eremei

Personal details
- Born: 27 January 1940 (age 86) Rădulenii Vechi, Kingdom of Romania
- Citizenship: Moldova; Romania
- Party: Agrarian Party of Moldova
- Other political affiliations: Communist Party of the Soviet Union (1964–1991)
- Spouse: Antonina Lucinschi (m. 1965; died 2005)
- Children: Chiril, Sergiu
- Education: Moldova State University
- Profession: Politician

Petru Lucinschi (Romanian: [ˈpetru luˈtʃinski]; born 27 January 1940) is a former Moldovan politician who was Moldova's second President from 1997 to 2001. He currently serves as the founder and head of the Lucinschi Foundation of Strategic Studies and International Relations.

== Early life and education ==
Petru Lucinschi was born on 27 January 1940 in Rădulenii Vechi village, Soroca County, Kingdom of Romania (now Florești district) into the family of Kirill Vasilievich Lucinschi. Lucinschi carries a transcribed version of the Polish surname Łuczyński, but has never publicly identified with a Polish heritage. In 1962, he graduated from Chisinau State University. During his studies, he was the secretary of the local Komsomol. From 1963 to 1964, he was engaged in Komsomol work in the Soviet Army. He has a PhD in Philosophy (1977) from the Russian Academy of Sciences in Moscow.

== Career in the Communist Party ==
In 1964, he was admitted to the Communist Party of the Soviet Union. From 1971, Lucinschi was a member of the Executive Committee (Politburo) of the Central Committee of the Communist Party in Moldavian SSR. He was the only native Moldovan in the leadership of Communist Party of Moldova at that time, when the leadership of Moldavian SSR was almost completely in the hands of people from outside the republic or Transnistrians.

From 1978 to 1989, he was First Secretary of Chișinău City Committee of the Communist Party of Moldova. In 1978, Ivan Bodiul sent him to work for the Communist Party of the Soviet Union in Moscow, where Lucinschi remained until 1986. From 1986 to 1989, Lucinschi was second secretary of the Central Committee of the Communist Party of Tajikistan. Upon his return to Moldavian SSR in 1989, he became first secretary of the Communist Party of Moldova. His appointment followed the civil unrest on 7 November during the 72nd anniversary celebrations of the Great October Socialist Revolution.

In early 1991, he was appointed Secretary of the Central Committee of the Communist Party of the Soviet Union, so he again left Moldavian SSR for Moscow.

- Presidency of Petru Lucinschi; 15 January 1997 – 7 April 2001
- President: Petru Lucinschi
- Prime Minister: Andrei Sangheli Ion Ciubuc Ion Sturza Dumitru Braghiș
- Cabinet: Second Sancheli Cabinet First Ciubuc Cabinet Second Ciubuc Cabinet Sturza Cabinet Braghiș Cabinet
- Election: 1996
- Seat: Presidential Palace 164 Stephen the Great Boulevard, Chișinău

== Immediate post-Soviet career (1991–1997) ==
In 1991, he was appointed as Ambassador of Moldova in Russia. On 4 February 1993, he was elected as Speaker of the Moldovan Parliament, being re-elected on 29 March 1994 for a new term. He held the position until 1997.

== Presidency (1997–2001) ==
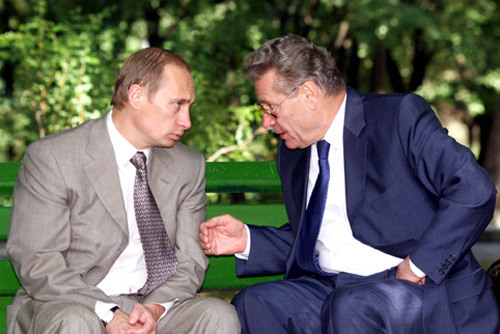
Vladimir Putin and Petru Lucinschi, Chișinău, 17 June 2000.

Lucinschi was elected Moldova's second president in November 1996. Upon his assumption to office, many Western media outlets portrayed him as a Moscow man who remained oriented toward the Soviet past. He was often seen as the lesser evil to Vladimir Voronin from the Party of Communists. Under his leadership, the reforms started by his predecessor Mircea Snegur were continued. It also marked the beginning of Moldova's distance from the nations of the Commonwealth of Independent States and closer relations with the European Union. Over his four years in power, the Lucinschi administration was marked by fierce confrontations in Parliament. He served until 2001, when he called a snap election, and the Parliament voted in favour of Vladimir Voronin.

=== Foreign policy ===
==== Russia and CIS ====
During his presidency, he advocated for close ties with Russia. He was friendly with Azerbaijani leader Heydar Aliyev, as they had worked together in the Soviet government and had been acquainted as leaders of their republics since 1970, when Lucinschi visited Baku.

== Post-presidency ==
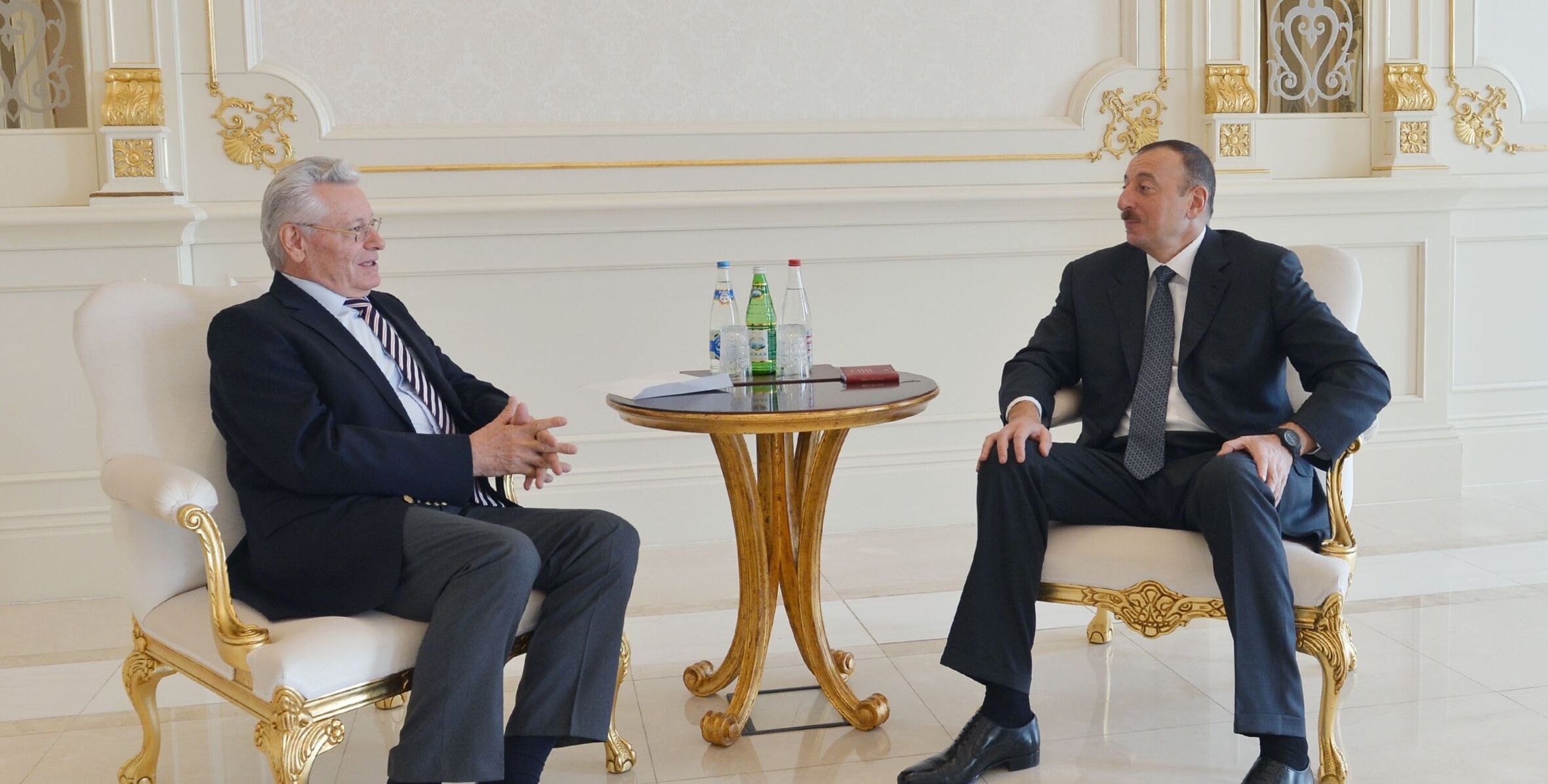
President of Azerbaijan Ilham Aliyev receiving Lucinschi in Baku in 2014.

Since leaving office, he has continued to meet with his former counterparts, including Azerbaijani leader Ilham Aliyev, Kazakh president Nursultan Nazarbayev, Estonian president Arnold Rüütel, and Ukrainian president Leonid Kravchuk. Upon the death of former Russian president Boris Yeltsin, he described him as a politician who "paid a lot of attention to the national aspirations of countries of the USSR conglomerate", saying in addition that he "played an essential role for young independent states like Moldova". In 2018, he published his book Pyotr Kirillovich Luchinsky – Member of the Politburo and President, authored by Russian writer Mikhail Lukichev. In early 2019, President Igor Dodon invited Lucinschi together with ex-president Mircea Snegur on a tour of the newly renovated Presidential Palace, which was in need for repairs for over a decade. In 2020, Lucinschi, along with 49 fellow members of the Nizami Ganjavi International Center based in Baku, called for international action to tackle new waves of the COVID-19 pandemic.

During the Russian invasion of Ukraine, he personally assisted Ukrainian families in settling down in Chisinau.

== Personal life ==
Lucinschi was married to Antonina (d. 2006), a retired schoolteacher, and has two sons, Sergiu and Chiril. Chirill is a businessman and politician who was as member of parliament as well as a professional basketball player.

== Awards ==
=== Domestic ===
- Order of the Republic (27 January 2005)
- Order of Ștefan cel Mare, II Degree (Metropolis of Chișinău and All Moldova, February 9, 2010)
- Om Emerit (28 January 2015)

=== Soviet ===
- Order of the Red Banner of Labor (twice)
- Order of Friendship of Peoples

=== Foreign ===
- Grand Cross of the Legion of Honour (France, 1998)
- Order of Redeemer (Greece, 1999)
- Grand Order of the Knights of the Holy Sepulchre (Greek Orthodox Church, Jerusalem, 2000)
- Medal "Bethlehem 2000" (Palestinian National Authority, 2000)
- Order "Star of Romania" (Romania, 2000)
- Medal "In Commemoration of the 850th Anniversary of Moscow" (Russia, 6 September 1997)
- Honorary Citizen of the City of Astana
- Honorary Badge of the Commonwealth of Independent States

Party political offices
Preceded by Semion Grossu	First secretary of the Communist Party of Moldova; 16 November 1989 – 4 February 1991	Succeeded by Grigore Eremei
Political offices
Preceded by Mircea Snegur	President of the Republic of Moldova; 1997–2001	Succeeded by Vladimir Voronin
