= Government House, Chișinău =

Coordinates: 47.024011°N 28.831434°E

Government House
- Casa Guvernului
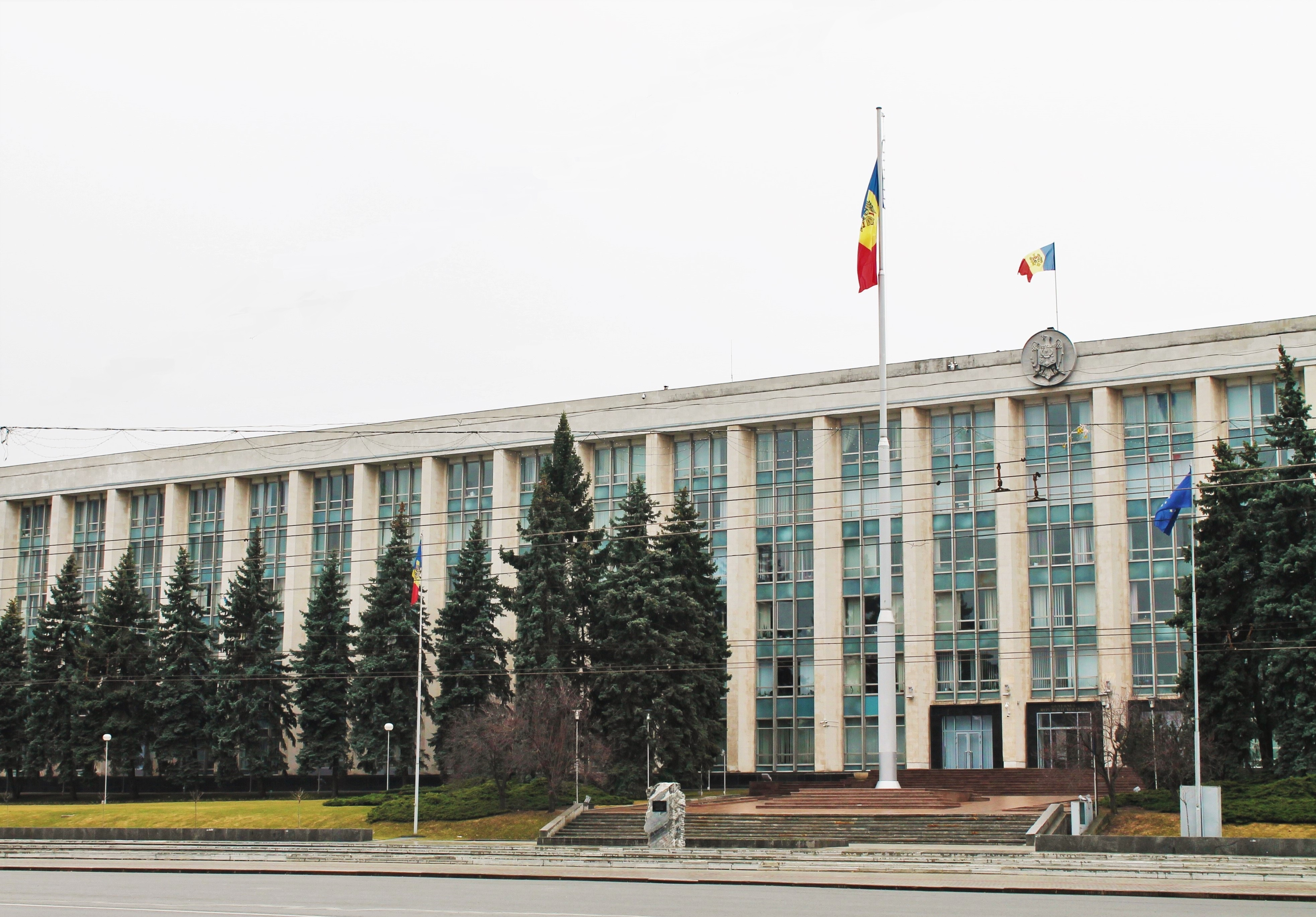
- Interactive map of the Government House area

General information
- Location: Great National Assembly Square, Chișinău, Moldova
- Current tenants: Cabinet of Moldova; Ministry of Economic Development and Digitalization; Ministry of Education and Research; Ministry of Infrastructure and Regional Development
- Completed: 1964
- Owner: Government of Moldova

Design and construction
- Architect: Semyon Fridlin

The Government House (Romanian: Casa Guvernului) is a building in Chișinău of the Government of Moldova located on Great National Assembly Square and Stefan cel Mare Avenue. It was designed by Semyon Fridlin in 1964 on Victory Square (now PMAN) and along Lenin Avenue (now Stefan cel Mare Avenue). It used to be the headquarters of the Council of Ministers of the Moldovan SSR. The building is a 6-storey reinforced concrete structure, lined with white stone, made in the shape of a letter Russian letter П (translated to P in English). Above the main entrance to the building is the inscription "The Government of the Republic of Moldova", as well as the coat of arms of Moldova and the flag of Moldova. In 2010, the Monument to the Victims of the Soviet Occupation was opened right in front of the building.

== Gallery ==
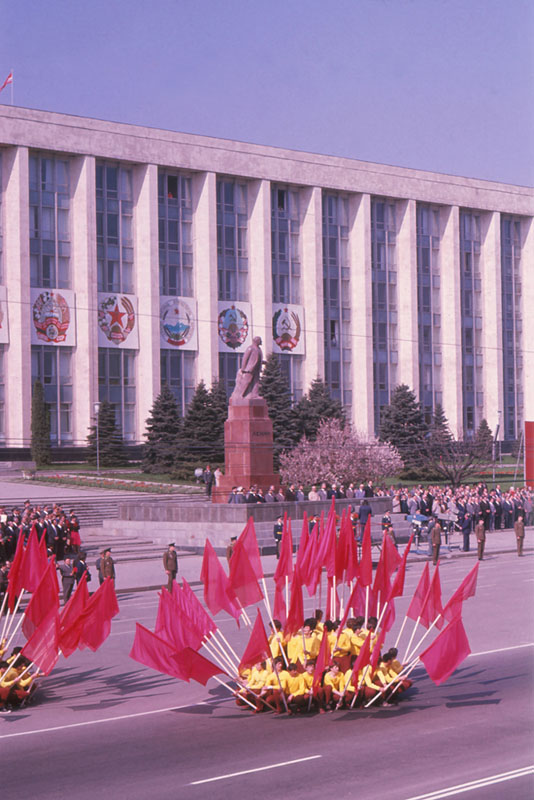
A parade in front of the building in 1980

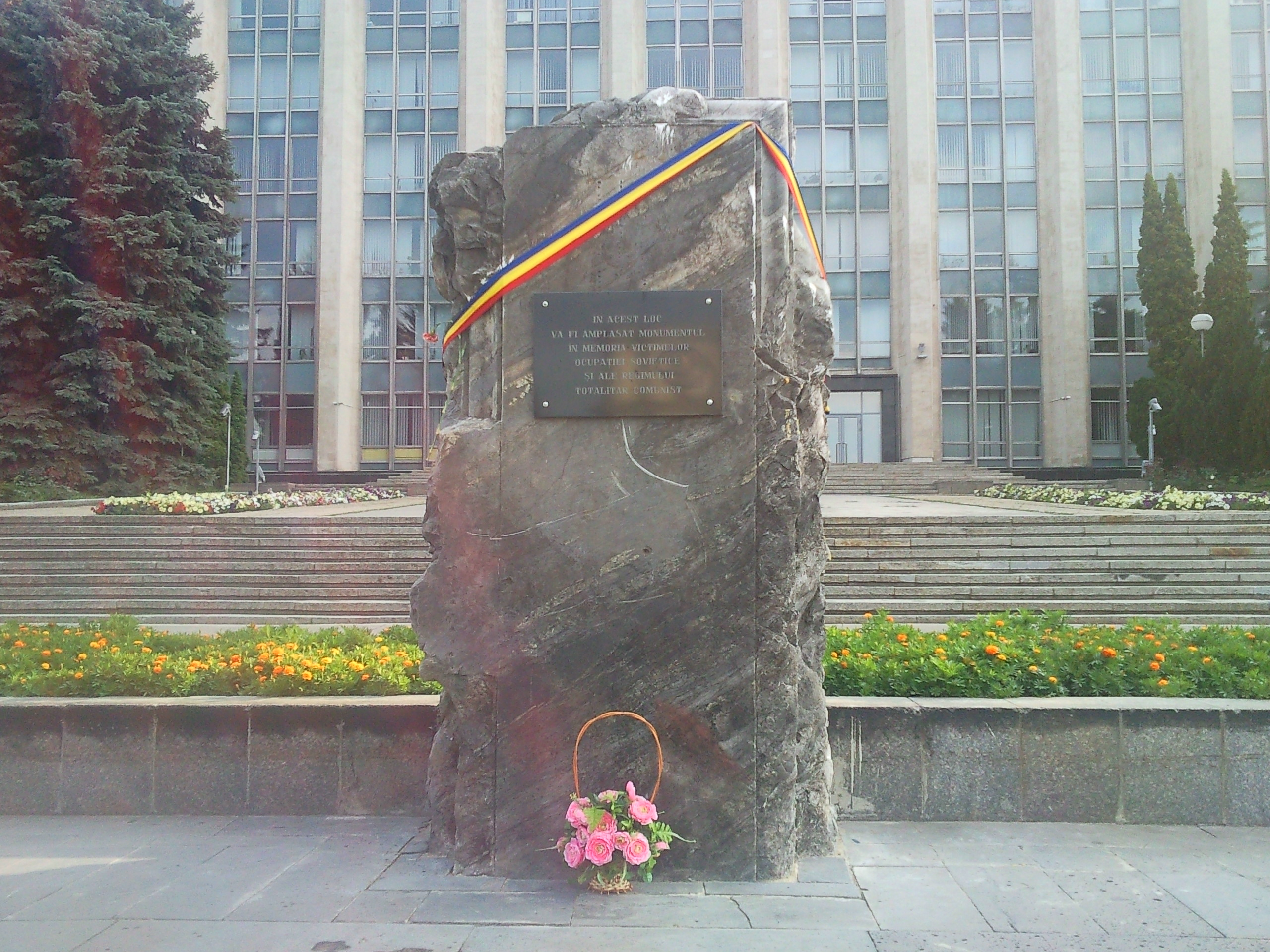
The Monument to the Victims of the Soviet Occupation

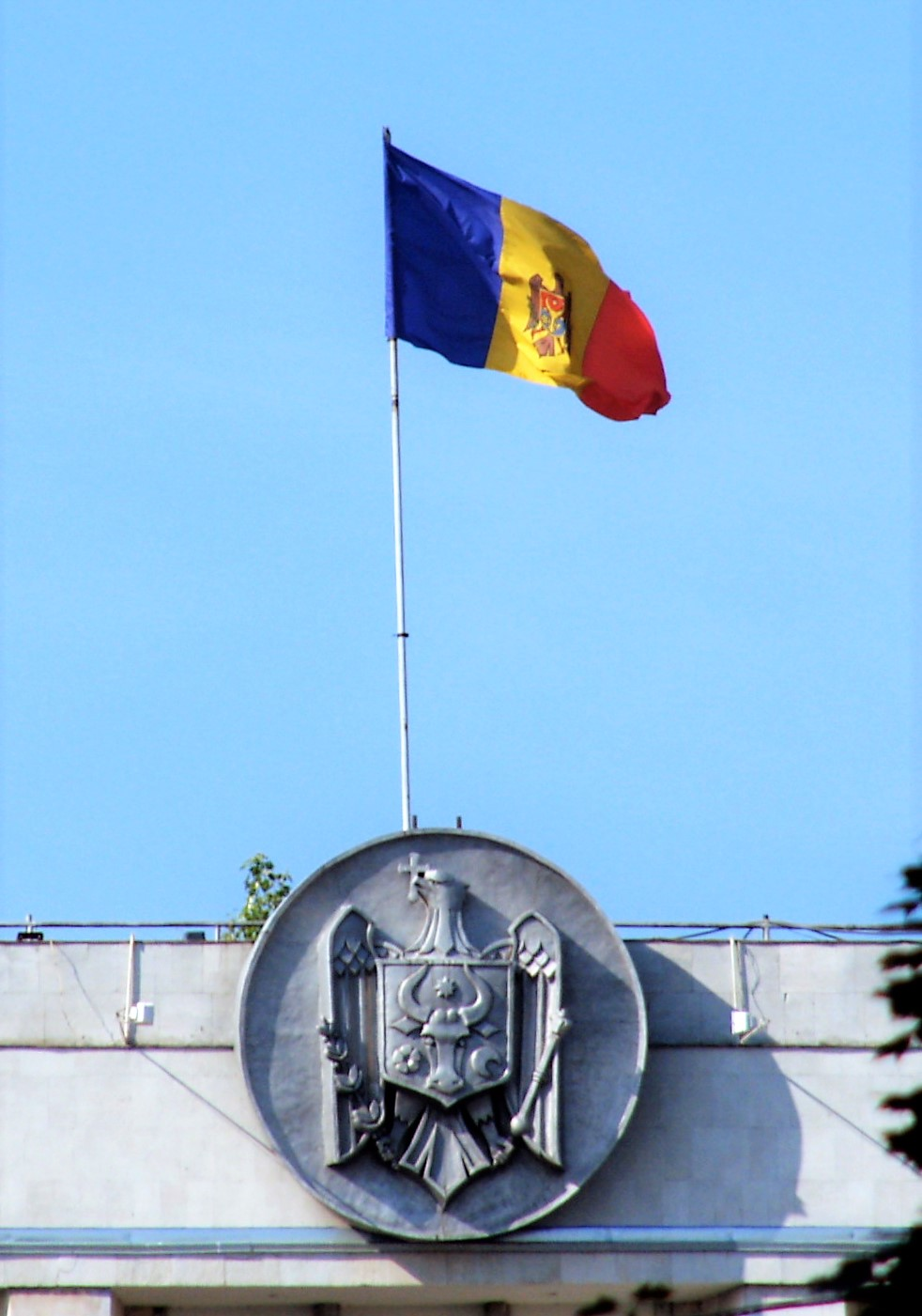
The flag and Moldovan coat of arms on the building

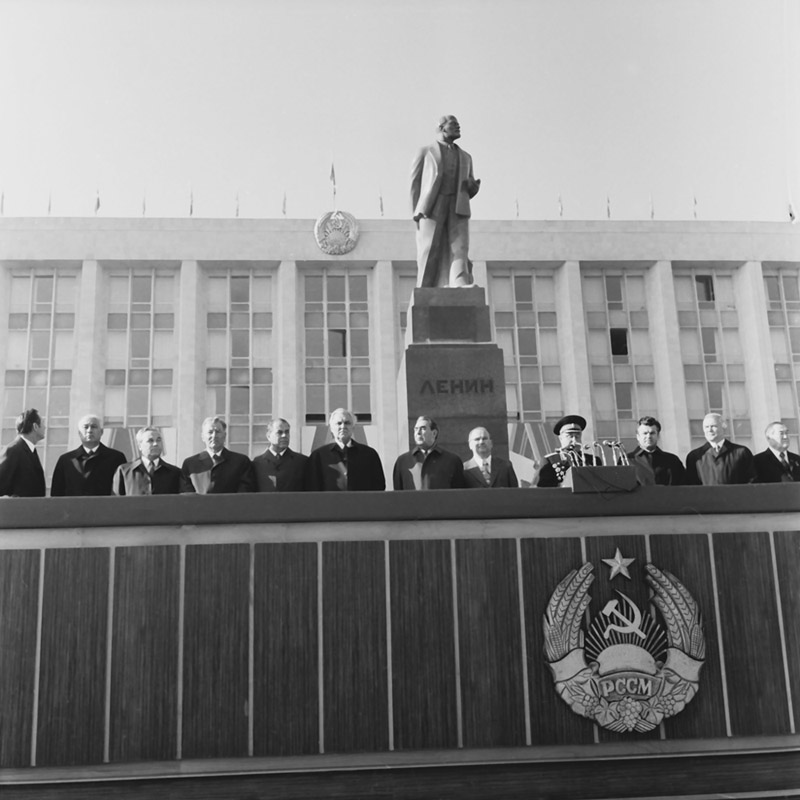
The Soviet and Moldovan political leadership on a grandstand in front of government house, but with Leonid Brezhnev during a ceremony in 1976 in Chișinău (then Kishinev)
