= Snihur =

Snihur (Ukrainian: Снігур), also transliterated Snigur, is a Ukrainian surname meaning "bullfinch" (Pyrrhula). Notable people with the name include:

- Daria Snigur (born 2002), Ukrainian tennis player
- Yevgeniya Snihur (born 1984), Ukrainian track and field athlete
- Joy Snihur Wyatt Laking (born 1950), Canadian artist

== See also ==
- Snegur, a related surname
