= 1989 Moldovan civil unrest =

Coordinates: 47°01′40″N 28°49′40″E

1989 Moldavian civil unrest
- Part of the Revolutions of 1989 and the Dissolution of the Soviet Union
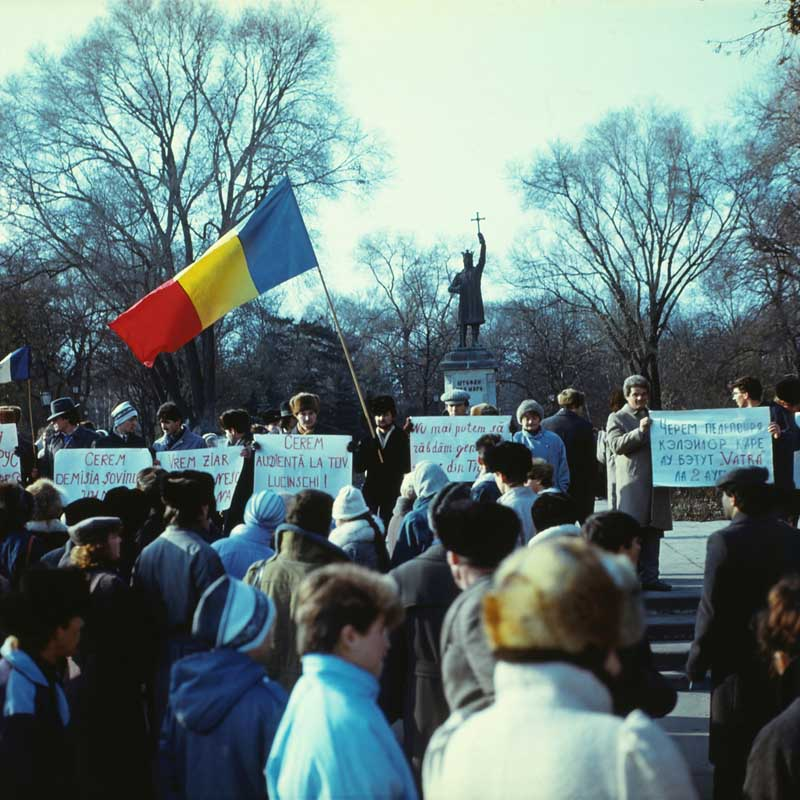
- Protesters in front of the statue of Stephen the Great
Date	7, 10 November 1989
Location	Great National Assembly Square, Chișinău, Moldavian SSR (now Moldova)
Result	Awakening of the Moldavian Nationalism within the Republic; Replacement of Semion Grossu with Petru Lucinschi by the Central Committee on November 16; Protesters burning down the Ministry of Internal Affairs HQ

Belligerents
Protesters; Popular Front of Moldova	Soviet Union; (Moldavian Soviet Socialist Republic) Communist Party of Moldavia

Commanders and leaders
Protesters (N/A)	(Moldavian Soviet Socialist Republic) Vladimir Voronin (Moldavian Soviet Socialist Republic) Semion Grossu

The 1989 civil unrest in Moldavia began on November 7, 1989, in Chișinău, in the Moldavian SSR, and continued on November 10, when protesters burned down the headquarters of the Ministry of Internal Affairs (led by Vladimir Voronin). Festivals on 7 November 1989 commemorating the October Revolution and 10 November celebrating the Soviet police force offered excellent opportunities for oppositionists to challenge authorities in highly visible settings and disrupt events of premiere importance to the Soviet regime. During the former event, protesters interrupted a military parade involving troops of the Chișinău Garrison on Victory Square (now Great National Assembly Square), which forced the military to cancel the mobile column planned that day.

Popular Front of Moldova activists, often going beyond the official sanction of the movement leadership, organized actions that embarrassed the republican leadership, ultimately resulted in riots in central Chișinău. This unrest sealed the fate of the increasingly weak First Secretary of the Communist Party of Moldavia. At the Politburo meeting of the CPM Central Committee of 9 November, the first secretary of the party, Simon Grossu urged militia to proceed to prosecute and arrest those responsible for the events of November 7. Moreover, he proposed that those arrested to be deported outside Moldavia. On November 10, protesters burned down the headquarters of the Ministry of Internal Affairs. On November 10, the minister of Internal Affairs Vladimir Voronin was hiding in the building of the Central Committee of the Communist Party, while defending the Ministry of Internal Affairs was entrusted to General Zhukov.

At the end of a year that had seen Semion Grossu and his organization pummeled from both the national revivalist right and the "ultrarevolutionary" internationalist left, Moscow replaced the First Secretary with Petru Lucinschi in a snap Central Committee plenum on November 16, 1989.
