= Semyon Fridlin =

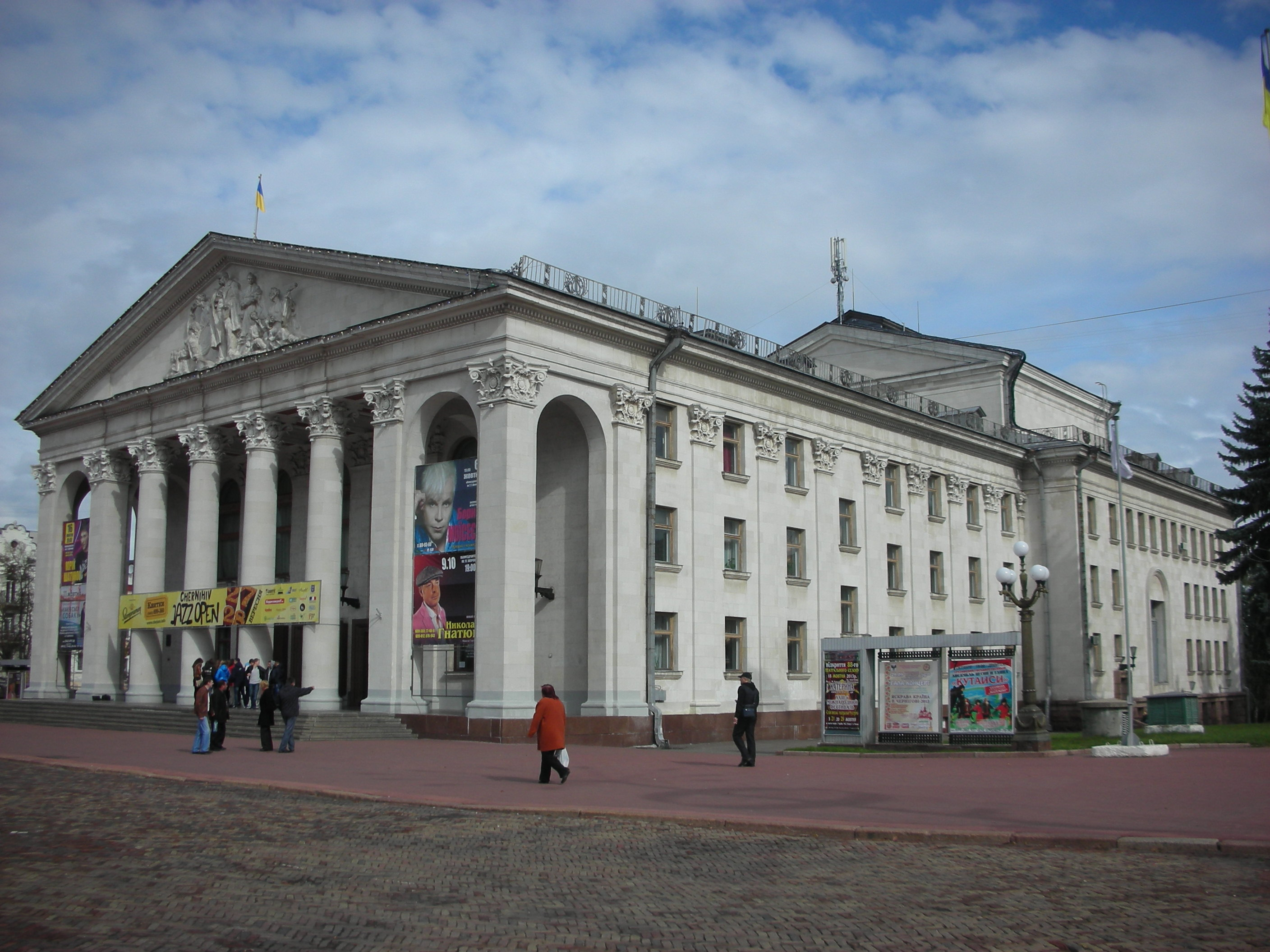
Music and Drama Theatre in Chernihiv, designed by Fridlin in 1958

Semyon Fridlin (Russian: Семён Давидович Фридлин; December 28, 1909 – December 12, 1992) was an architect in the Union of Soviet Socialist Republics (U.S.S.R), who was the first architect to be awarded the title of “Distinguished architect of the Moldavian S.S.R.”

In 1932 he graduated from the Dnepropetrovsk Civil Engineering Institute in what is now the nation of Ukraine, and lived in what is now the national capital, Kiev. Among his notable works in Ukraine were the music and drama theaters in Zaporozhye (1947–1953) and Chernihiv (1958), Kiev Central Market Hall (1959), and the 18-storey Corps of Engineers building in Kiev (1975). In Chișinău, Republic of Moldova he was responsible for the Government House (1960–1965) and the "Octombrie" Palace (now the National Palace, 1974).
