= 1991 Moldovan presidential election =

- 8 December 1991
- Turnout: 83.96%
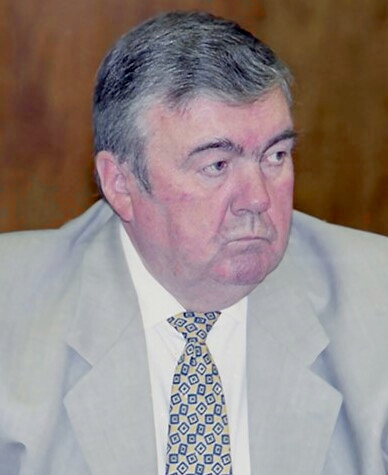
Nominee	Mircea Snegur
Party	Independent
Popular vote	1,952,142
Percentage	98.22%
President before election
Mircea Snegur
Independent
Elected President
Mircea Snegur
Independent

Presidential elections were held in Moldova on 8 December 1991. Due to a boycott by the Popular Front of Moldova, incumbent Mircea Snegur was the only candidate to contest the elections and was elected unopposed.

== Background ==
The elections were held amid high ethnic tensions, with separatists in Gagauzia and Transnistria declaring they would not participate in the elections.

== Results ==
Candidate	Party	Votes	%
Mircea Snegur	Independent	1,952,142	98.22
Against		35,451	1.78
Total		1,987,593	100.00
Valid votes		1,987,593	99.96
Invalid/blank votes		791	0.04
Total votes		1,988,384	100.00
Registered voters/turnout		2,368,287	83.96
Source: Nohlen & Stöver
