= Galina Dodon =

First Lady of Moldova (born 1977)

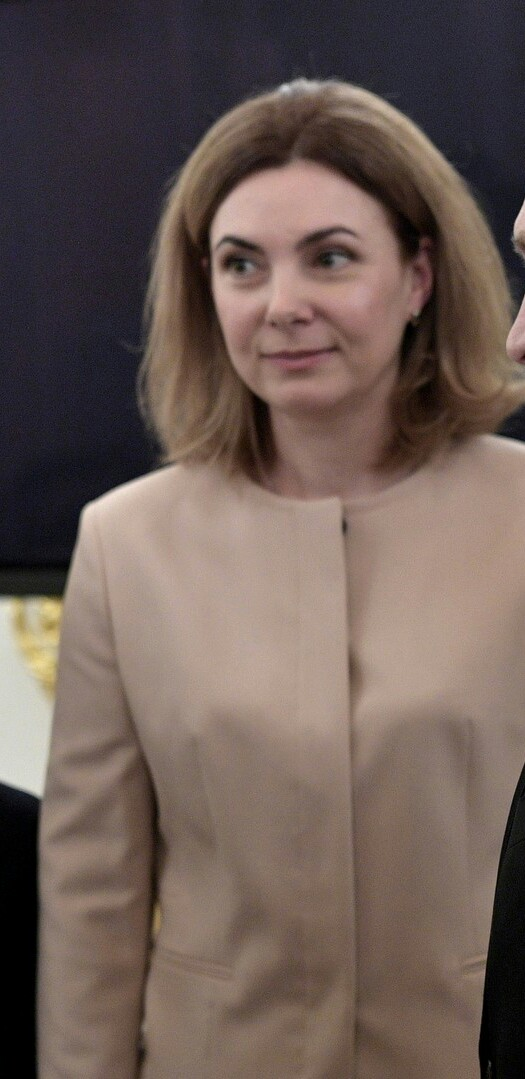
- Dodon in 2018

First Lady of Moldova
- In role 23 December 2016 – 24 December 2020
- President: Igor Dodon
- Preceded by: Margareta Timofti

Personal details
- Born: 12 February 1977 (age 49) Molovata, Dubăsari District, Moldavian SSR, Soviet Union
- Spouse: Igor Dodon (m. 1999)
- Children: 3
- Profession: Accountant
- Website: Official website

Galina Dodon (born 12 February 1977) is the wife of the former president of Moldova Igor Dodon, serving as the First Lady of Moldova from 2016 to 2020.

== Biography ==
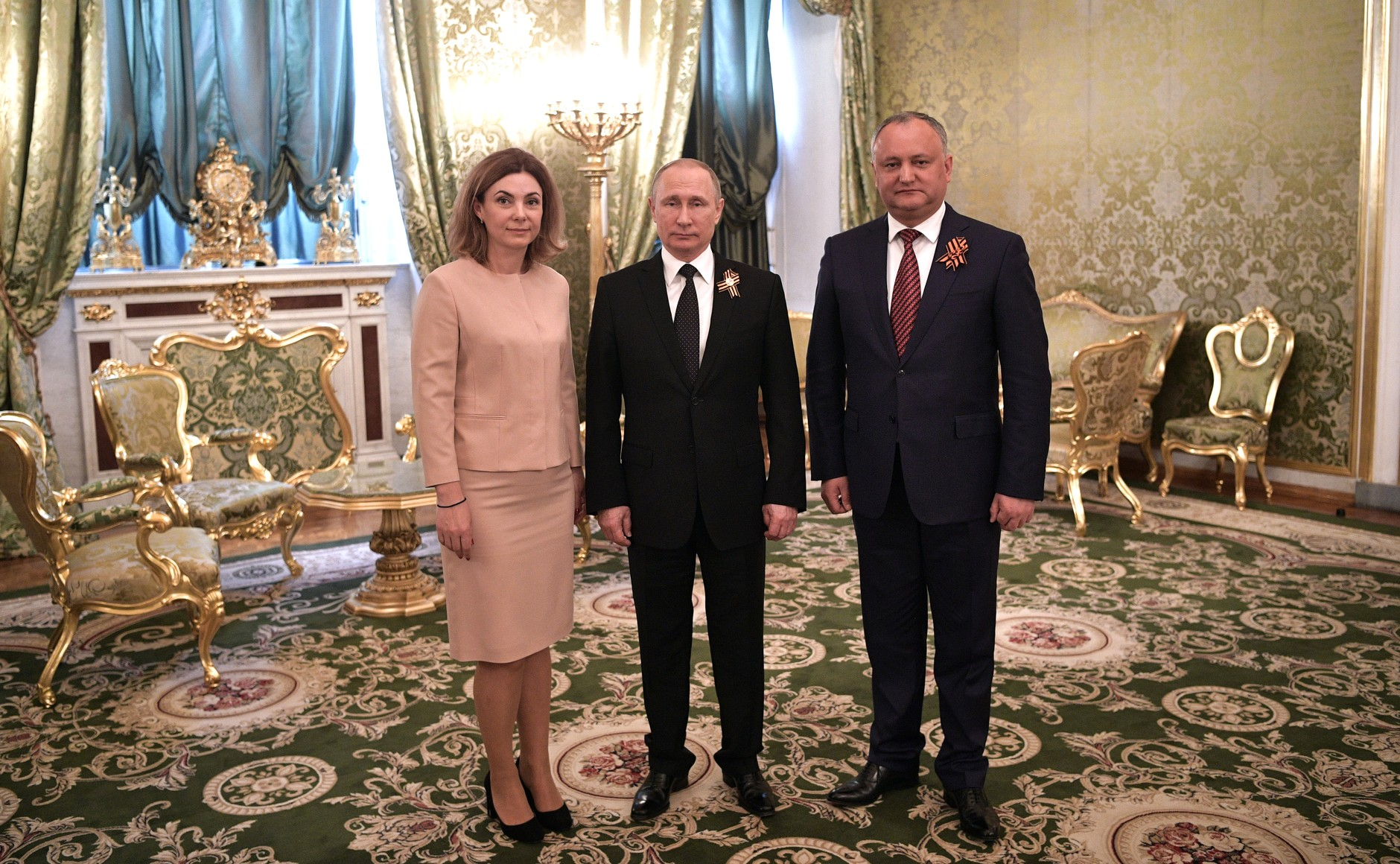
Dodon with her husband and Russian president Vladimir Putin in the Kremlin

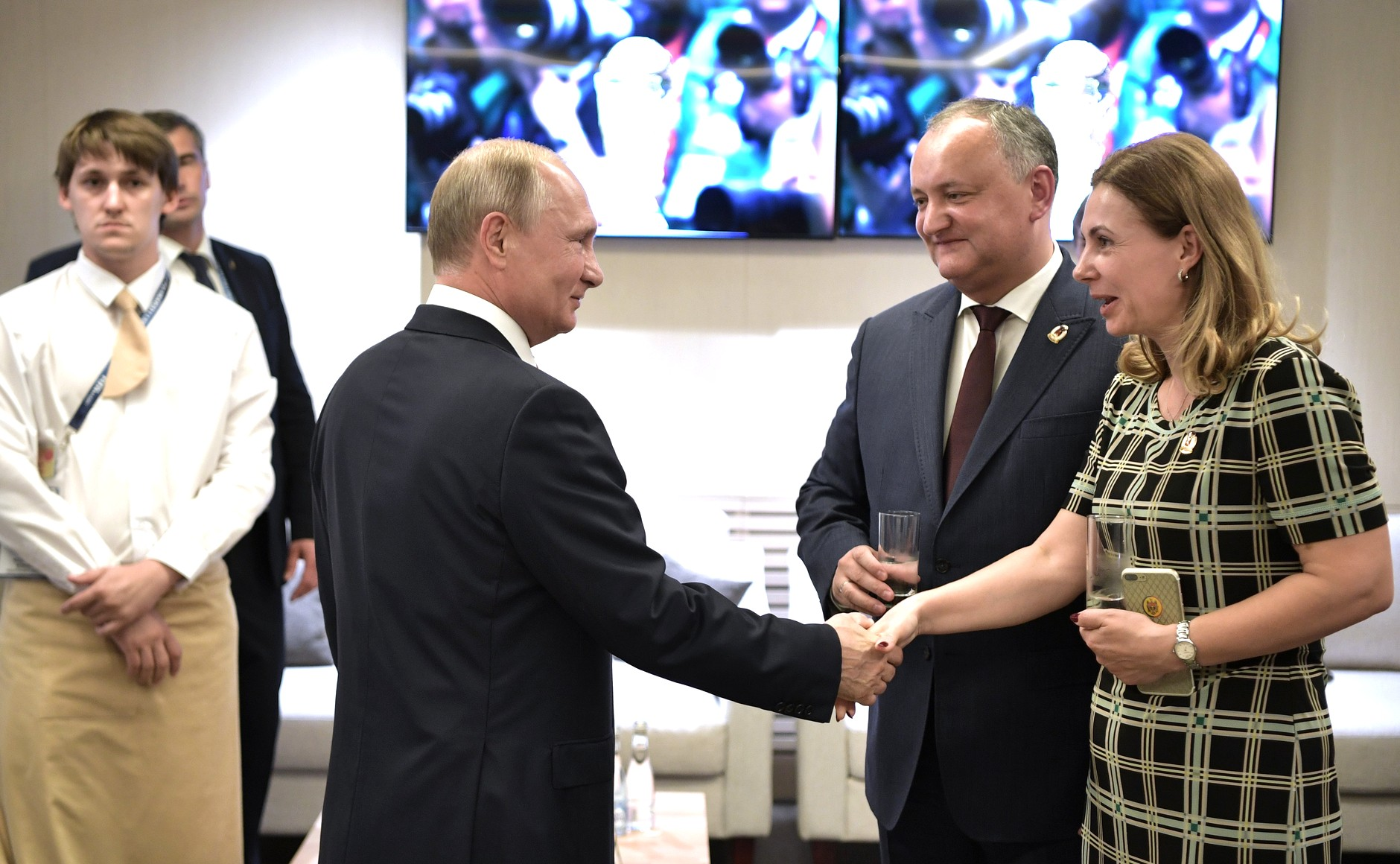
Dodon with Putin during the 2018 FIFA World Cup opening ceremony

She was born on 12 February 1977 in Molovata in the Moldavian Soviet Socialist Republic. She began her professional activity as an accountant in September 1999, the same year that she married Igor Dodon, whom she met in a student hostel. Until 2012, she was deputy chief accountant at the Chamber of Commerce and Industry of the Republic of Moldova. She has been the financial director of Exclusive Media since March 2012. Dodon has said that she always tries to avoid politics at home and in the media.

Galina and Igor Dodon have three children: Bogdan, Vlad, and Nicolae. Apart from her native language- Romanian, she is also fluent in Russian and English.
