= Margareta Timofti =

Moldovan lawyer and former First Lady of Moldova

First Lady of Moldova
- In role 23 March 2012 – 23 December 2016
- President: Nicolae Timofti
- Preceded by: Victoria Lupu
- Succeeded by: Galina Dodon

Personal details
- Born: Margareta Postolachi; 7 January 1956 (age 70) Parcani, Moldavian SSR, Soviet Union (now Moldova)
- Spouse: Nicolae Timofti
- Children: 3
- Profession: Lawyer

Margareta Timofti (born 7 January 1956) is a Moldovan lawyer who is the wife of Nicolae Timofti, the 4th President of Moldova. With her husband being President, she served as the First Lady of Moldova during his term.

== Biography ==
Timofti was born in January 1956 in the village of Parcani, Soroca District to Lazăr and Feodora Postolachi. She spent most of her childhood in Dumbrăveni with her sister Valentina. In 1973 she graduated from her local high school. Immediately following her graduation up until 1977, she studied at the Faculty of Library Science and Bibliography at Moldova State University. In 2005 she graduated from the law school of the same university, receiving a diploma of higher education in law. In the late 70s and early 80s, she worked as a bibliographer before becoming the head of a library for youth in the capital of Chișinău. Beginning in 1985 and over the course of the 20 years that followed, she was an academic secretary at the Ion Creangă National Children's Library in Chișinău. Between 2005 and 2006 She worked as a notary trainee in the private notary bureau of the capital. Since 2010, she has been the main consultant for the European Law Department and the Legal Department of the Secretariat of the Parliament of Moldova. In early 2012, she participated in an international leadership program organized by the United States Department of State.

Margareta Timofti has three children with her husband Nicolae: Alexei (born 1977) who is a lawyer for the World Bank in Washington, D.C., Nicolae (born 1980) is a sports journalist in Chișinău, and Ștefan (born 1989) is a student majoring in economics in Chișinău.

== First Lady ==
As First Lady, Timofti was involved in a number of social, educational and cultural projects. Under her patronage, the project “Satul meu” and the National Book and Reading Festival and the Festival of Oia were implemented. Margareta Timofti is the honorary president of the International Women's Club of Moldova and the SOS Autism Association.

On March 23, 2013, members of the National Association of Scouts of Moldova (NASM) met with Timofti to discuss a possible parliamentary resolution that states its support for the NASM. For three days in May 2014, Polish First Lady Anna Komorowska visited Chișinău at the invitation of Timofti, during which the two both visited the Nikolai Gogol High School, where 150 children study in Polish taught classes. In August 2016, she and her husband, paid their respects to Queen Anne of Romania at Peleș Castle, who died ten days prior in Switzerland.
