= Antonina Lucinschi =

First Lady of Moldova

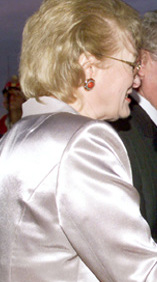
- Lucinschi in 2000

First Lady of Moldova
- In role 15 January 1997 – 7 April 2001
- President: Petru Lucinschi
- Preceded by: Georgeta Snegur
- Succeeded by: Taisia Voronin

Personal details
- Born: 13 September 1939
- Died: 16 September 2005 (aged 66) Chișinău, Moldova
- Spouse: Petru Lucinschi (m. 1965)
- Children: Chiril, Sergiu

Antonina Lucinschi (13 September 1939 – 16 September 2005) was a Moldovan schoolteacher who was the wife of Petru Lucinschi, the 2nd President of Moldova. As a result of her marriage, she was the First Lady of Moldova from 15 January 1997 to 7 April 2001.

She was born in 1939 in the Soviet Union into a family of Russian origin. She married her husband in January 1965 just after he was discharged from the Soviet Army. They first met at a concert inside the Bolshoi Theatre. Soon thereafter, they gave birth to their first son. In the mid-late 70s, she studied at the Ion Creangă Pedagogical State University and the Moscow State Pedagogical University.

During the presidency of her husband, Lucinschi took part in the foundation of charitable organizations such as Brindusele Sperantei, the Forum of Women's Organizations of Moldova, and the Philanthropist club of classical music lovers. The Association Against Domestic Violence "Casa Mărioarei" was an independent association founded in 2000 at the initiative of Lucinschi to support survivors of domestic violence.

Lucinschi had two sons, Sergey and Chiril. She died in 2005 after an illness and was buried in the Central Armenian Cemetery of Chișinău. A national contest of musicians is held in her name annually.
