= Monument to the Victims of the Soviet Occupation =

Proposed monument in Chișinău, Moldova

- Romanian: Piatra comemorativă a victimelor ocupației sovietice și ale regimului totalitar comunist
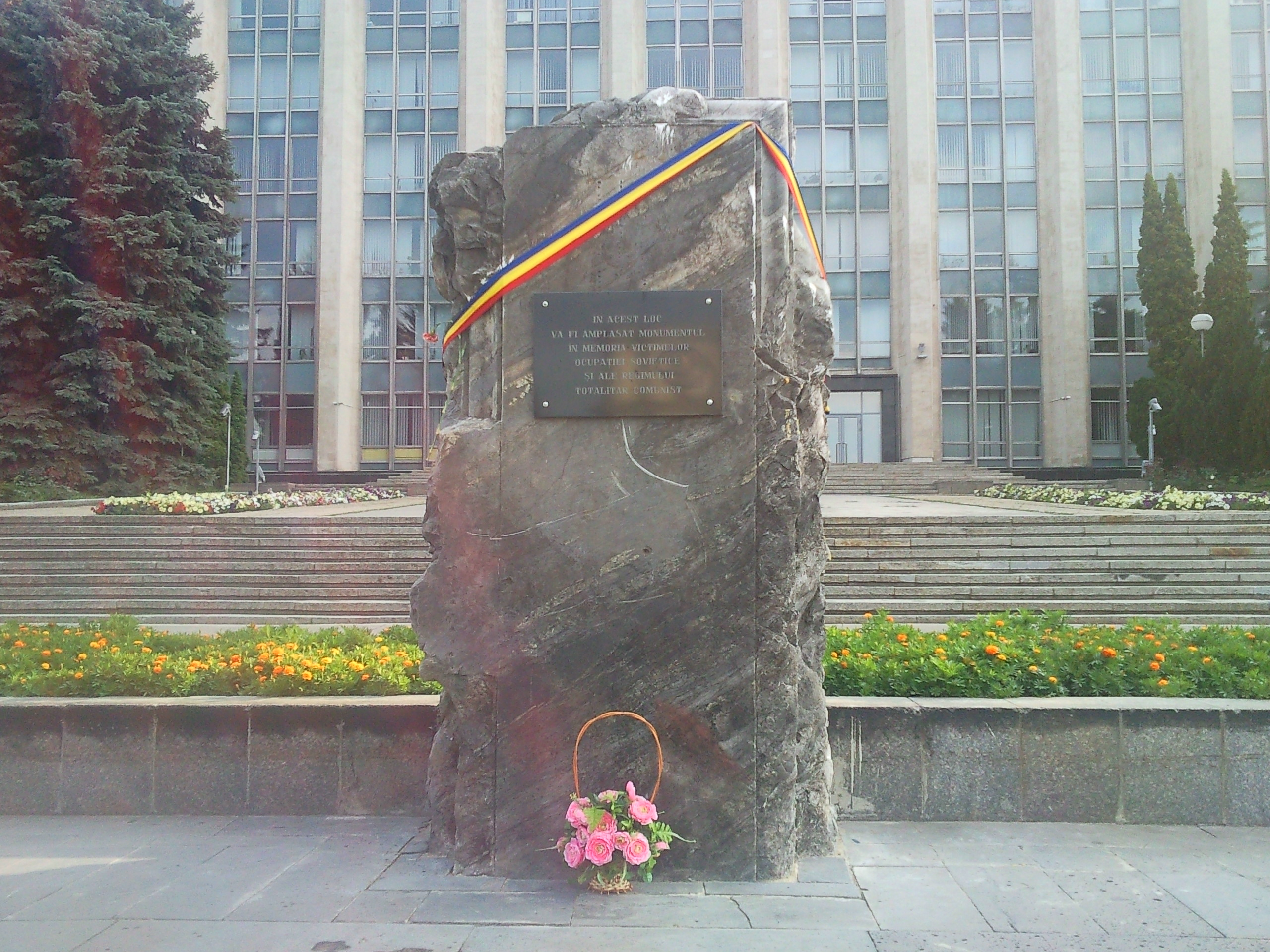
- Interactive map of Monument to the Victims of the Soviet Occupation
- Location: Central Chișinău, Moldova
- Coordinates: 47°01′32″N 28°49′39″E
- Beginning date: 2010
- Opening date: June 28, 2010
- Dedicated to: Victims of Soviet Occupation

The Monument to the Victims of the Soviet Occupation (Romanian: Piatra comemorativă a victimelor ocupației sovietice și ale regimului totalitar comunist) is a proposed monument in Chișinău, Moldova.

A commemorative stone was unveiled on 28 June 2010, as a monument to the victims of the Soviet occupation and the totalitarian communist regime, Soviet Occupation Day in Moldova. It is located on Great National Assembly Square, formerly known as Victory Square and once home to the central monument to Vladimir Lenin of Soviet Moldavia. It is prominent in front of Government House, originally the seat of the Council of Ministers of the Moldavian SSR and now of the Cabinet of Moldova. In English, the inscription on the stone reads:

In this place will be built a monument in memory of the victims of Soviet occupation and the totalitarian communist regime.

== Gallery ==
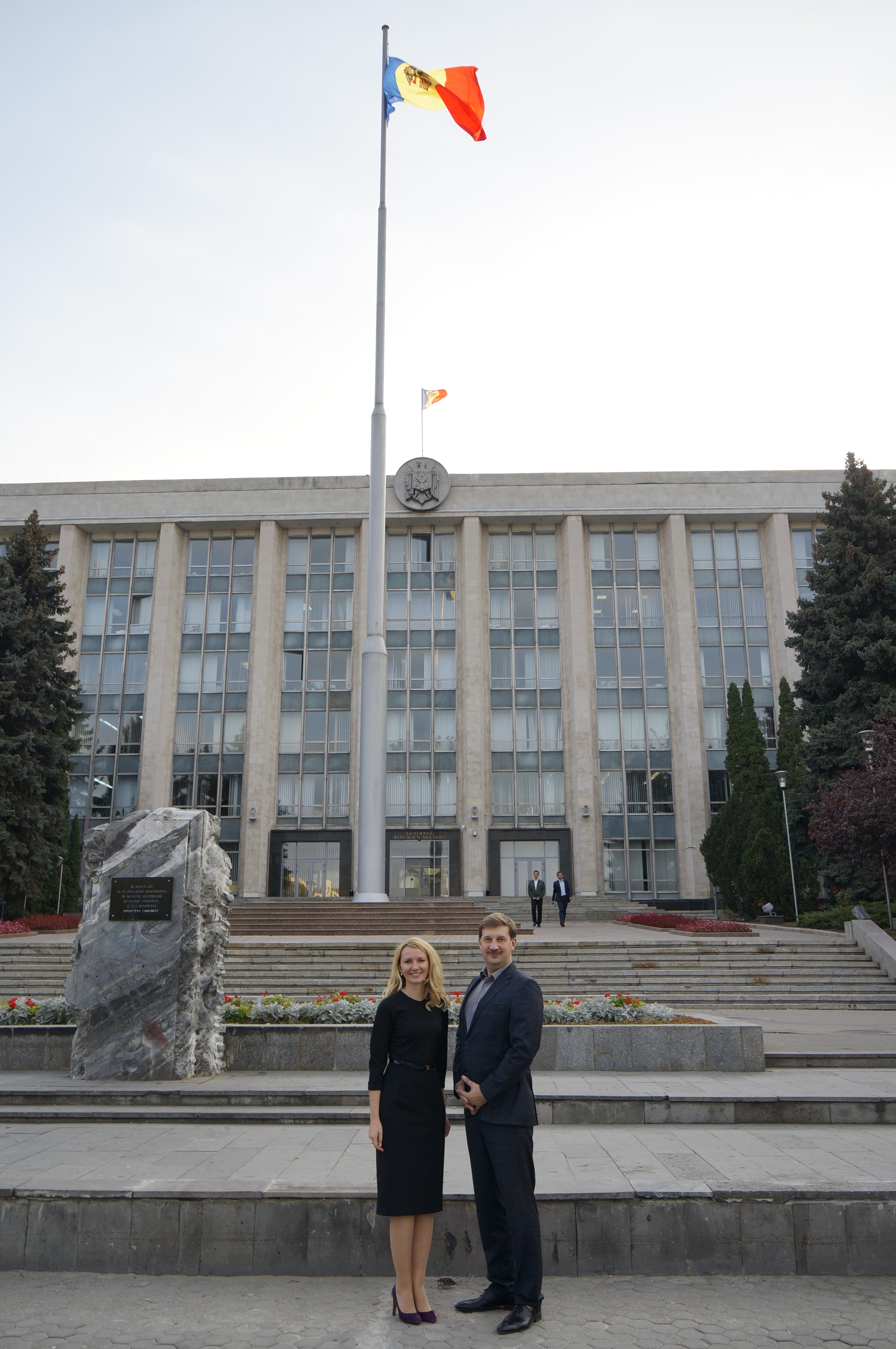
Memorial stone visible on left

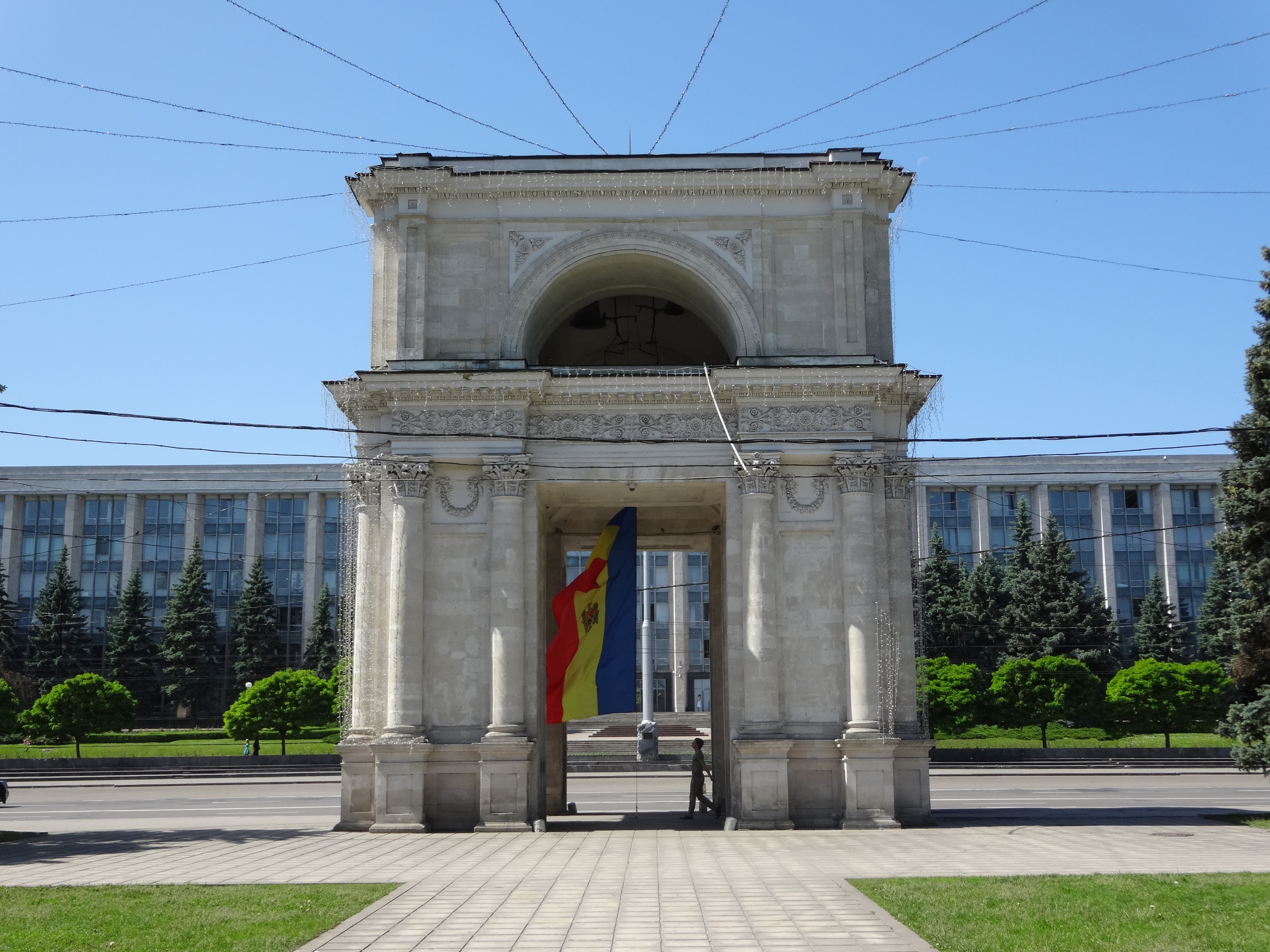
View from the Triumphal Arch of Chișinău

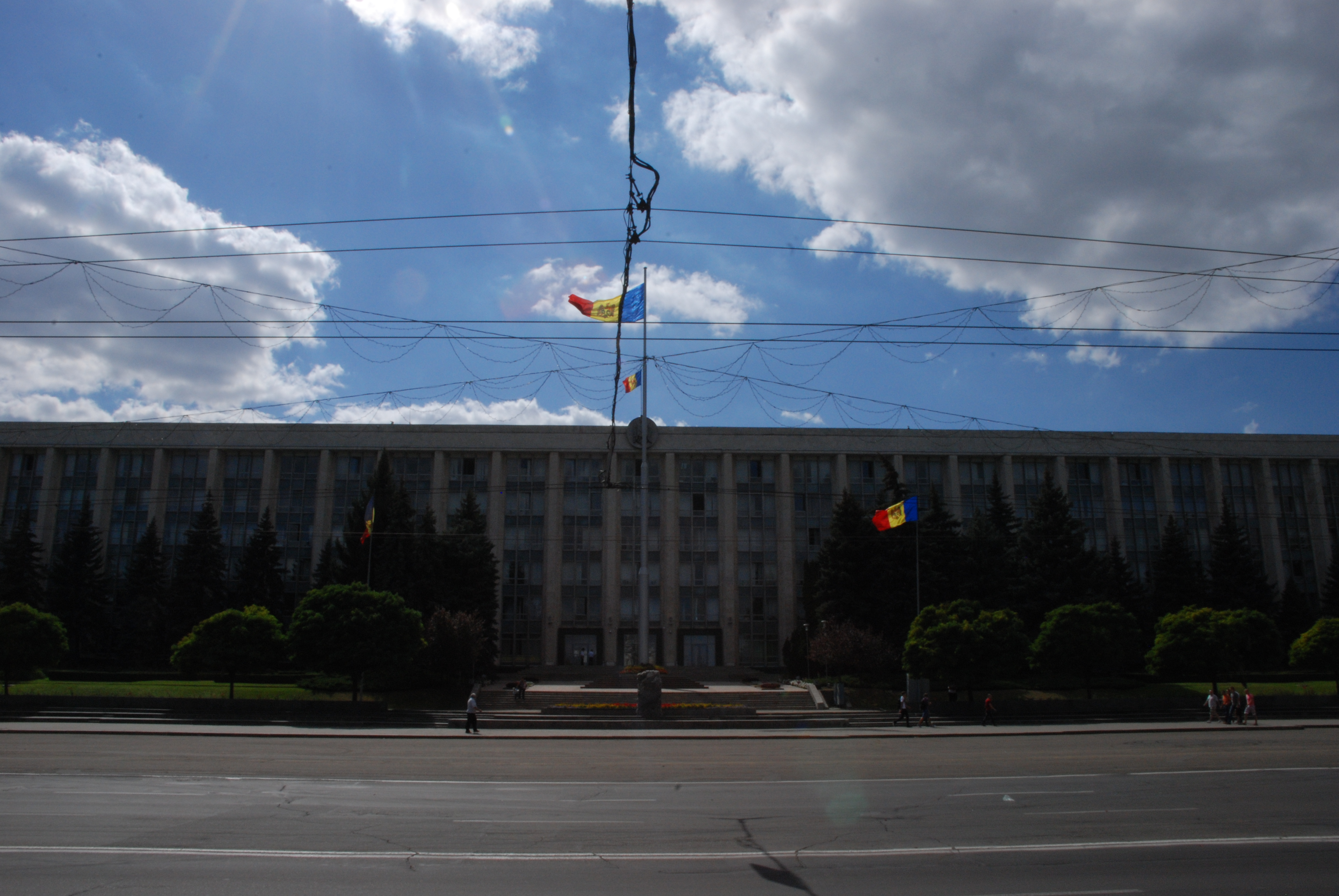
Government House at Chișinău

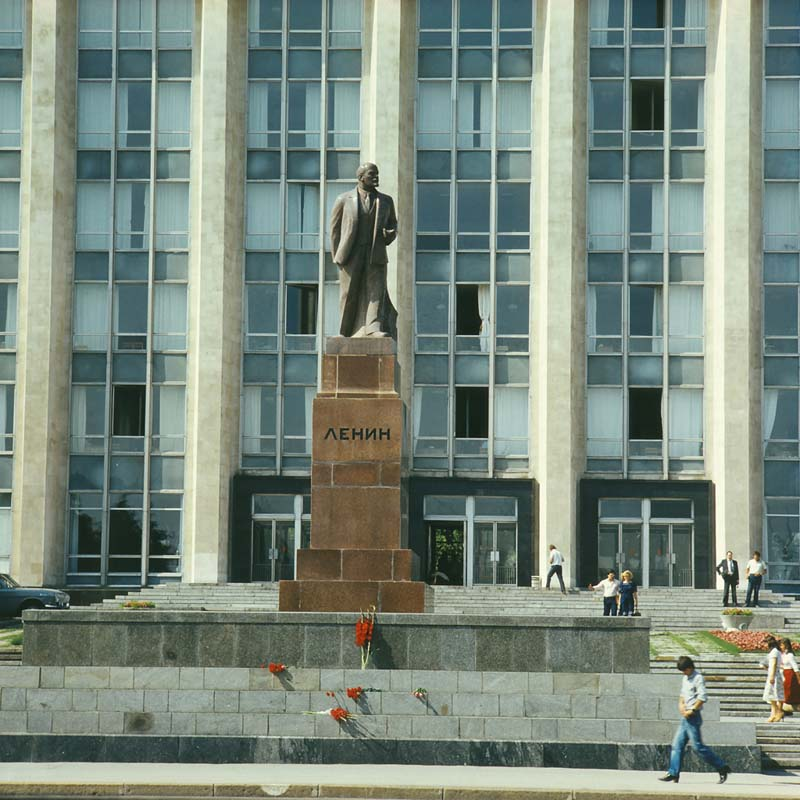
Former statue of Lenin

== See also ==
- Memorial to Victims of Stalinist Repression
