= Trifănești =

- Commune
- Location within Moldova
- Coordinates: 47.9430555556°N 28.1311111111°E
- Country: Moldova
- District: Florești District

Population (2014)
  - Total: 1,181
- Time zone: UTC+2 (EET)
  - Summer (DST): UTC+3 (EEST)

Trifănești is a commune in Florești District, Moldova. It is composed of two villages, Alexandrovca and Trifănești.
