= Memorial to Victims of Stalinist Repression =

Train of Pain – The Memorial to Victims of Stalinist repression
- Romanian: Monumentul în memoria victimelor deportărilor regimului comunist
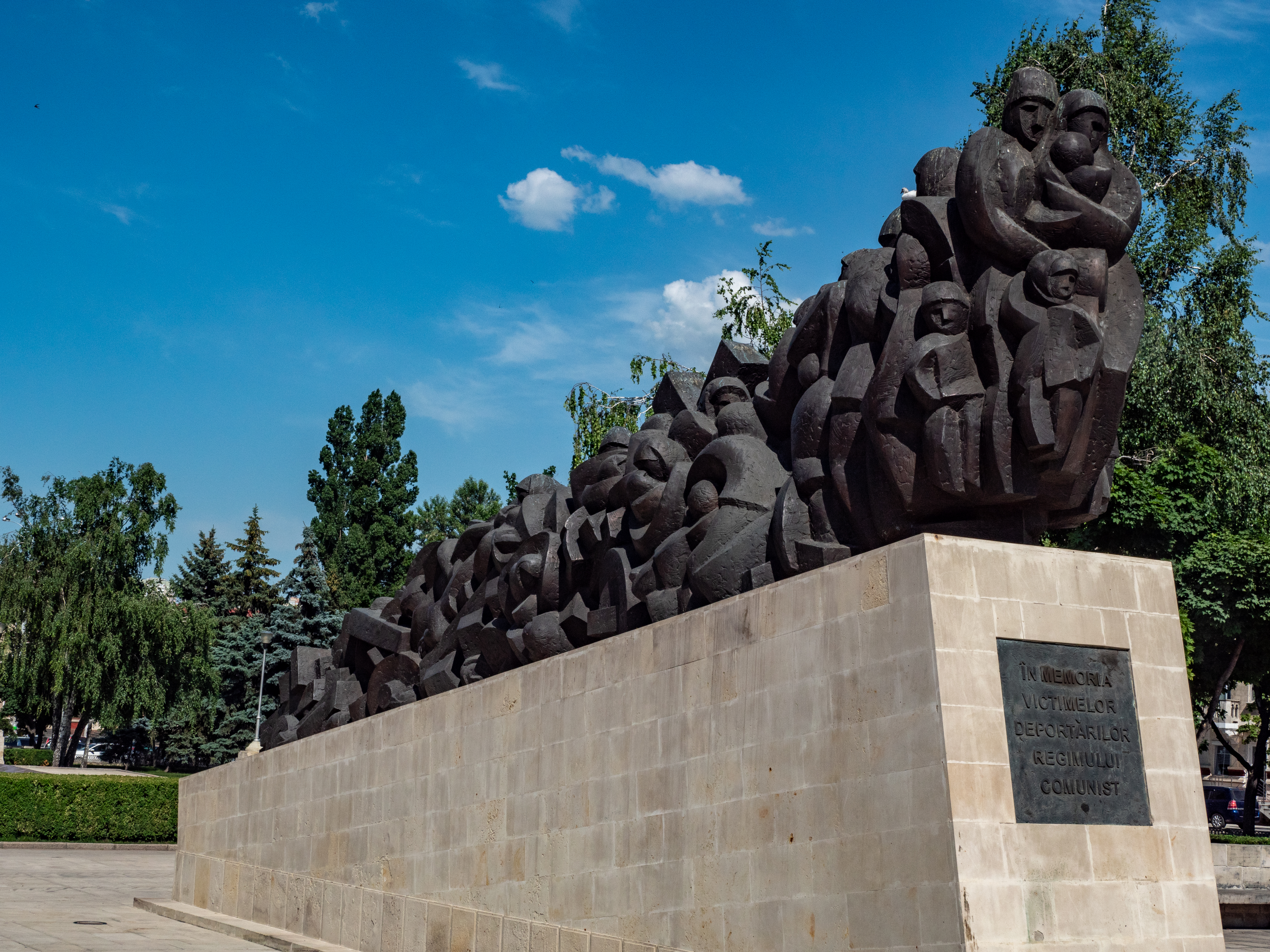
- The memorial in 2019
- Interactive map of Train of Pain – The Memorial to Victims of Stalinist repression
- Location: Chișinău
- Coordinates: 47°00′43″N 28°51′31″E
- Designer: Iurie Platon
- Length: 12 metres (39 ft)
- Height: 2 metres (6.6 ft)
- Beginning date: 2012
- Completion date: 2013
- Dedicated to: Victims of Communism

The Train of Pain – Memorial to Victims of Stalinist Repression (Romanian: Trenul durerii – Monumentul în memoria victimelor deportărilor regimului comunist) is a monument in Chișinău, Moldova. A temporary stone was unveiled in 1990 in Central Station Square commemorating the 1940–1951 mass deportations in Soviet Moldavia. A permanent memorial was completed at the site in 2013. The sculptural element was assembled in Belarus.

== Temporary memorial ==
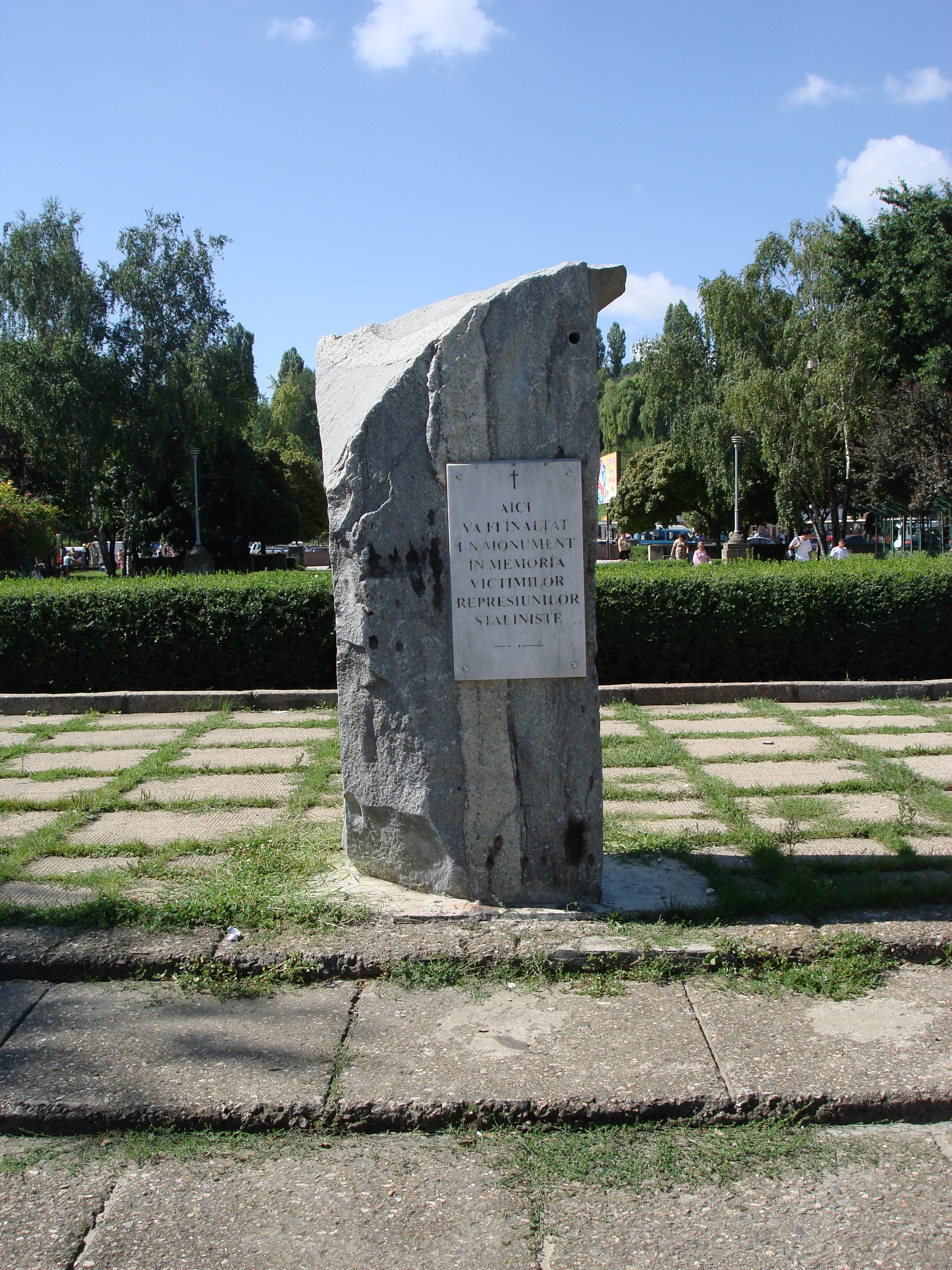

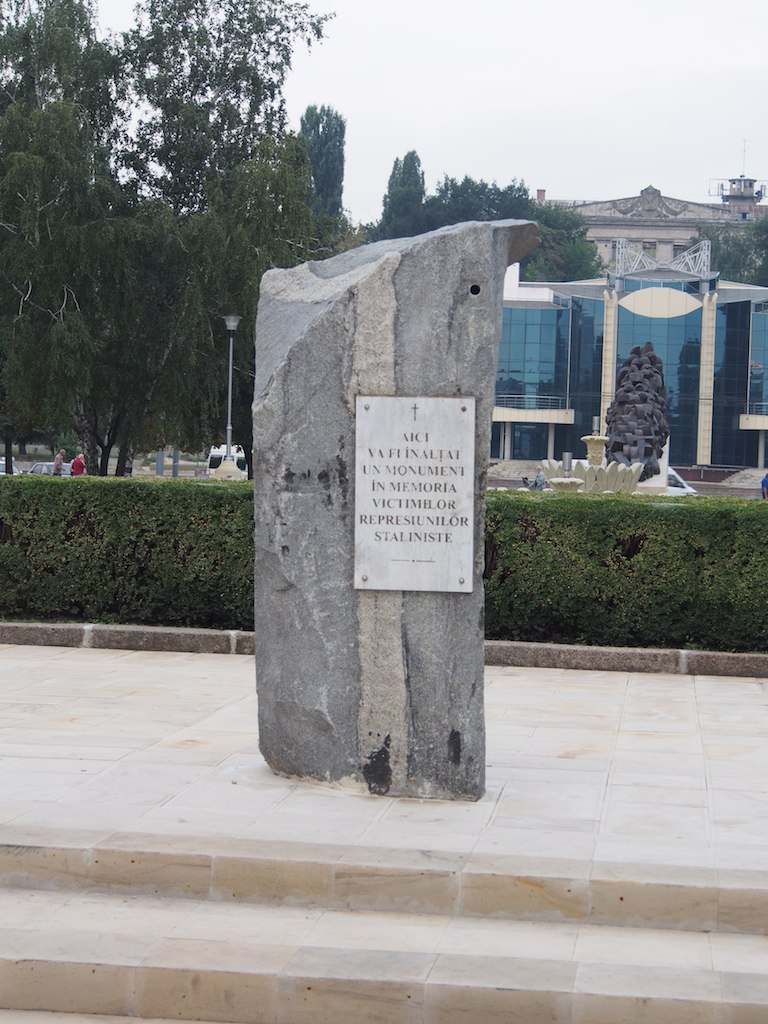

== See also ==
- Monument to the Victims of the Soviet Occupation
- Soviet Occupation Day, Moldova
