= Great National Assembly Square, Chișinău =

Square in Chișinău, Moldova

Great National Assembly Square
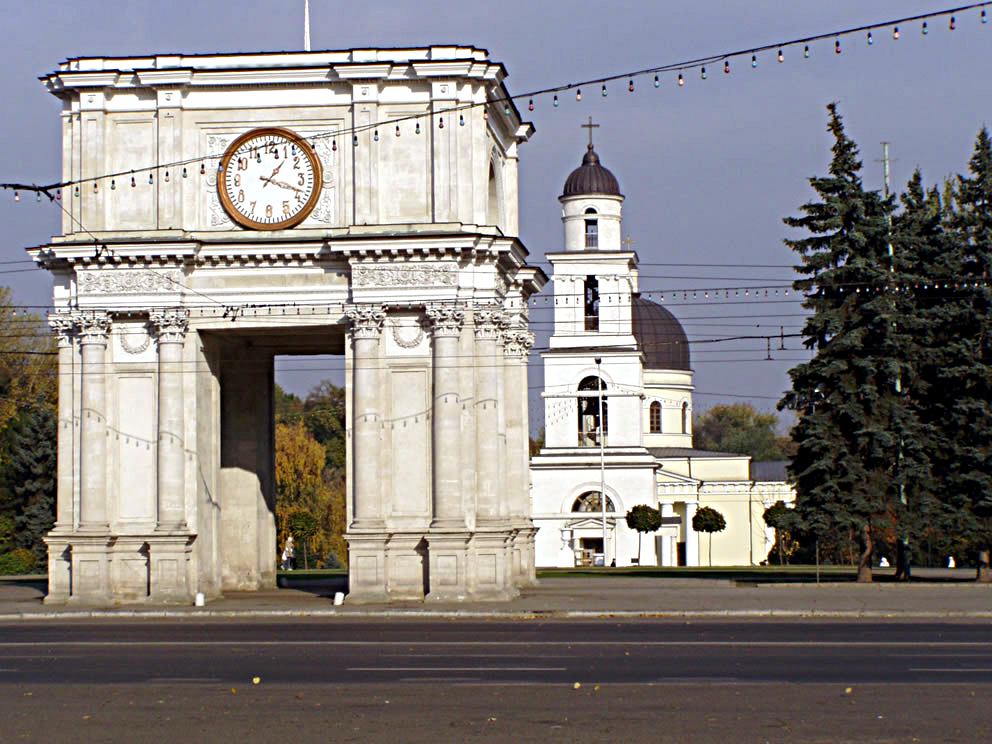
- The Triumphal Arch and Nativity Cathedral on the square.
- Native name: Piața Marii Adunări Naționale (Romanian)
- Former name: Victory Square
- Type: Square
- Location: Chișinău, Moldova

Other
- Known for: The Central Square in Chișinău

The Great National Assembly Square (Romanian: Piața Marii Adunări Naționale), formerly known as Victory Square (Romanian: Piața Biruinței) is the central square in Chișinău, the capital of Moldova. It is surrounded by the following buildings and monuments:

- Stephen the Great Monument
- Monument to the Victims of the Soviet Occupation
- Government House
- Triumphal Arch
- Nativity Cathedral
- Cathedral Park

== History ==
In the 19th century, the space of several hundred square meters from the perimeter of the current Stefan cel Mare Avenue. In 1812, became a permanent center for government business. It had the same type of urban planning done in the Russian Empire. At the beginning of the 20th century, many working demonstrations were held here, and after 1924, when the street already bore the name of King Carol II Boulevard, a series of demonstrations and strikes took place on its main square. August 1, 1929, when a one-day political rally was announced. In 1944, the street became a square, with the new authorities naming it Victory Square. In its present form, the square has existed since December 1951. In 1987–1988, it was enlarged by the Soviets after they removed the ruins of the old Eparchial House. In April 2003, the Government of Moldova rejected the request of the Council of Veterans of the Soviet Army to revert the name of the square back to Victory Square. Prime Minister Vasile Tarlev called the proposal a "challenge", adding that the name is inappropriate and that such a decision can only be taken by Chișinău City Hall, which later rejected the veterans proposal.

== Massed events ==
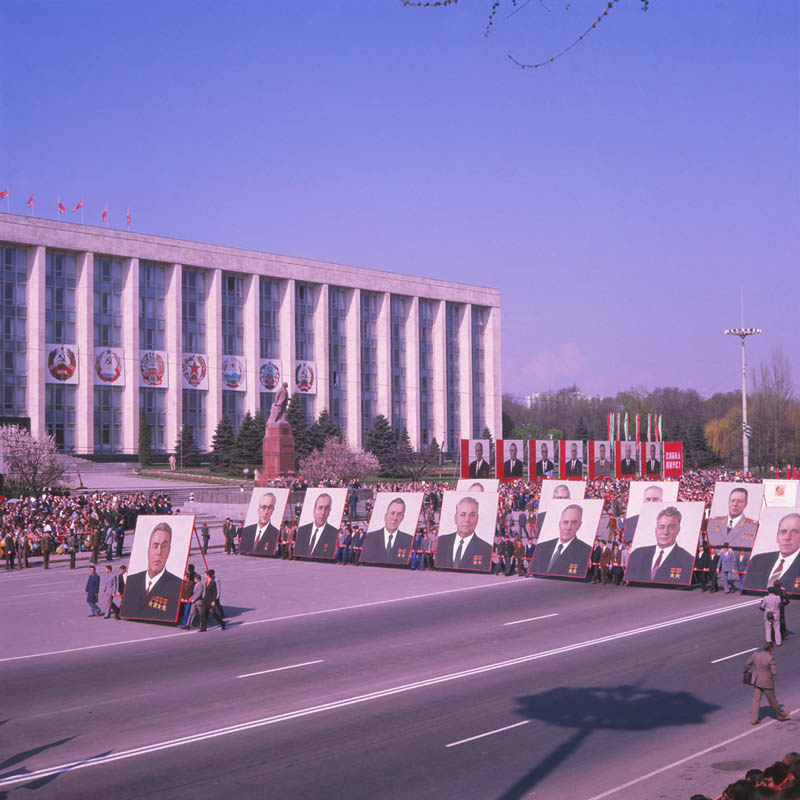
Victory Square during a May Day parade in 1971.

Under government legislation, anyone can stage public events in the square with consent from the Chisinau City Hall.

=== Parades ===
During the Soviet Moldovan era, parades were held on this square in honor of the Great October Socialist Revolution, May Day, and Victory Day, until the 1989 Moldovan civil unrest during which the military parade of the Kishinev Garrison in honor of the October Revolution was interrupted by demonstrators. On the morning of 7 November, a group of 100 people took candles and stood in front of Soviet tanks preparing for the parade. Once supporters of the Popular Front of Moldova arrived at Victory Square, the leaders of Communist Party of Moldova left the central stage immediately. The independent Armed Forces of Moldova hosted military parades were dedicated to the independence of Moldova. These parades were held in 2001, 2011, and 2016.

=== Public demonstrations ===
In 1966, Soviet cosmonaut Yuri Gagarin visit the city, attending a mass demonstration on the square. It marked the 500th anniversary of the city's establishment. On August 31, 1989, the adoption of the Romanian language as a state language occurred on the square. A 2018 rally supporting the reunification of Moldova and Romania was held on the square. In the run up to the 2020 Moldovan presidential election, an organization affiliated with President Igor Dodon, the Union of Officers of Moldova, occupied the square.

=== Political activities ===
On 15 May 2000, after the Government's initiative to abolish benefits for veterans of the Soviet–Afghan War, sympathizers went to Great National Assembly Square. Protests against President Vladimir Voronin took place on the square during the April 2009 Moldovan parliamentary election protests. Many mass events during the 2015–2016 protests in Moldova took place in the square. On 21 May 2023, the European Moldova National Assembly took place in the square.

== Gallery ==
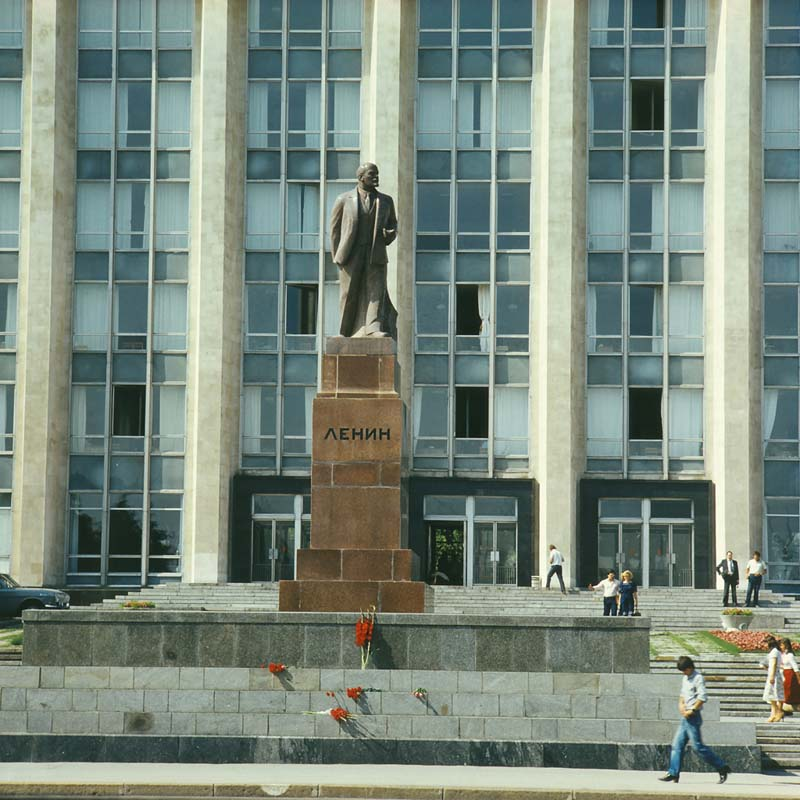
Lenin Statue

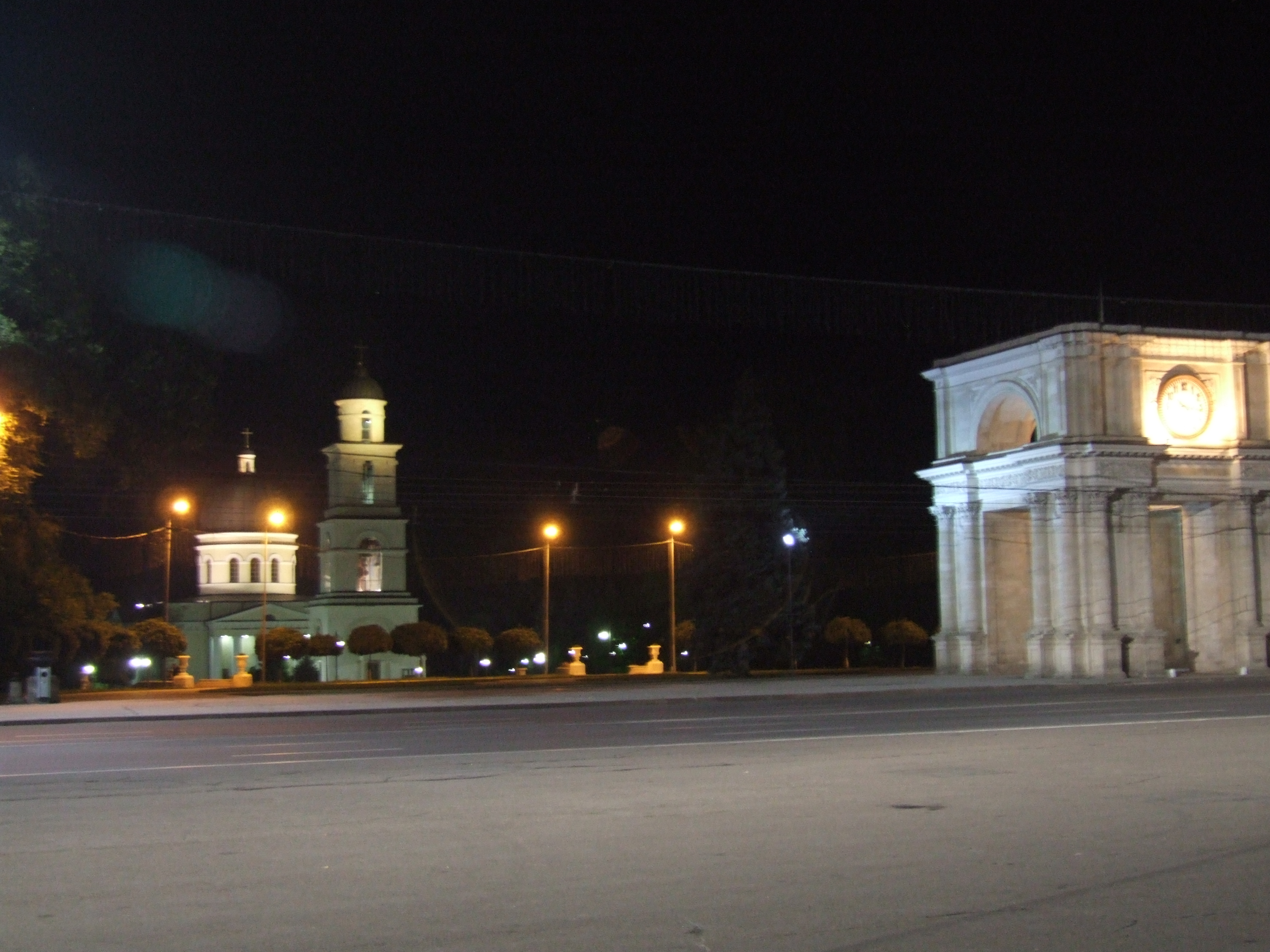
The Triumph Ark and Cathedral at night

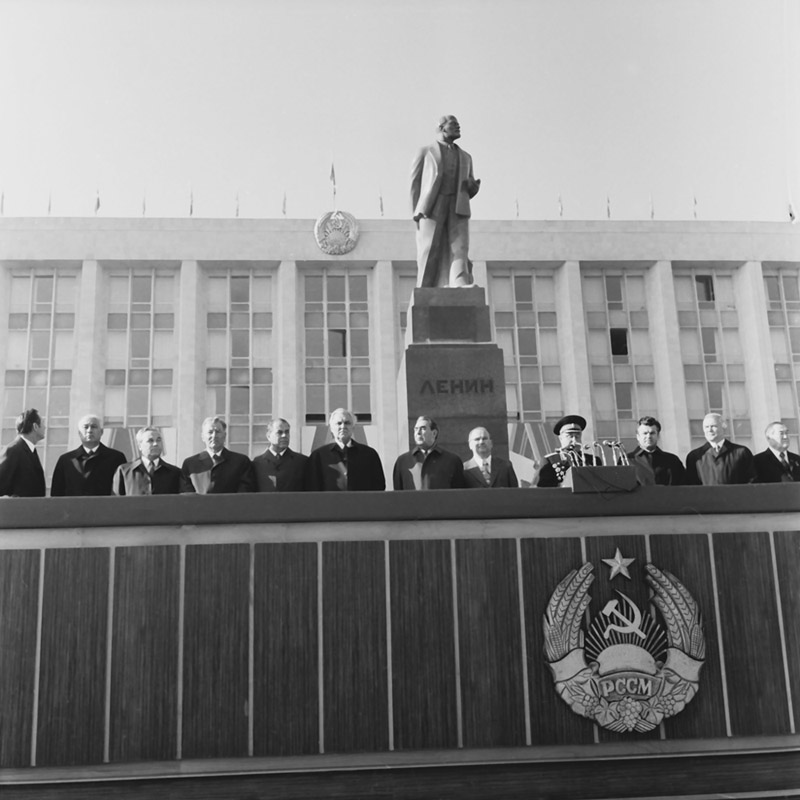
Leonid Brezhnev and Ivan Bodiul on a grandstand on the square during a parade in 1974.

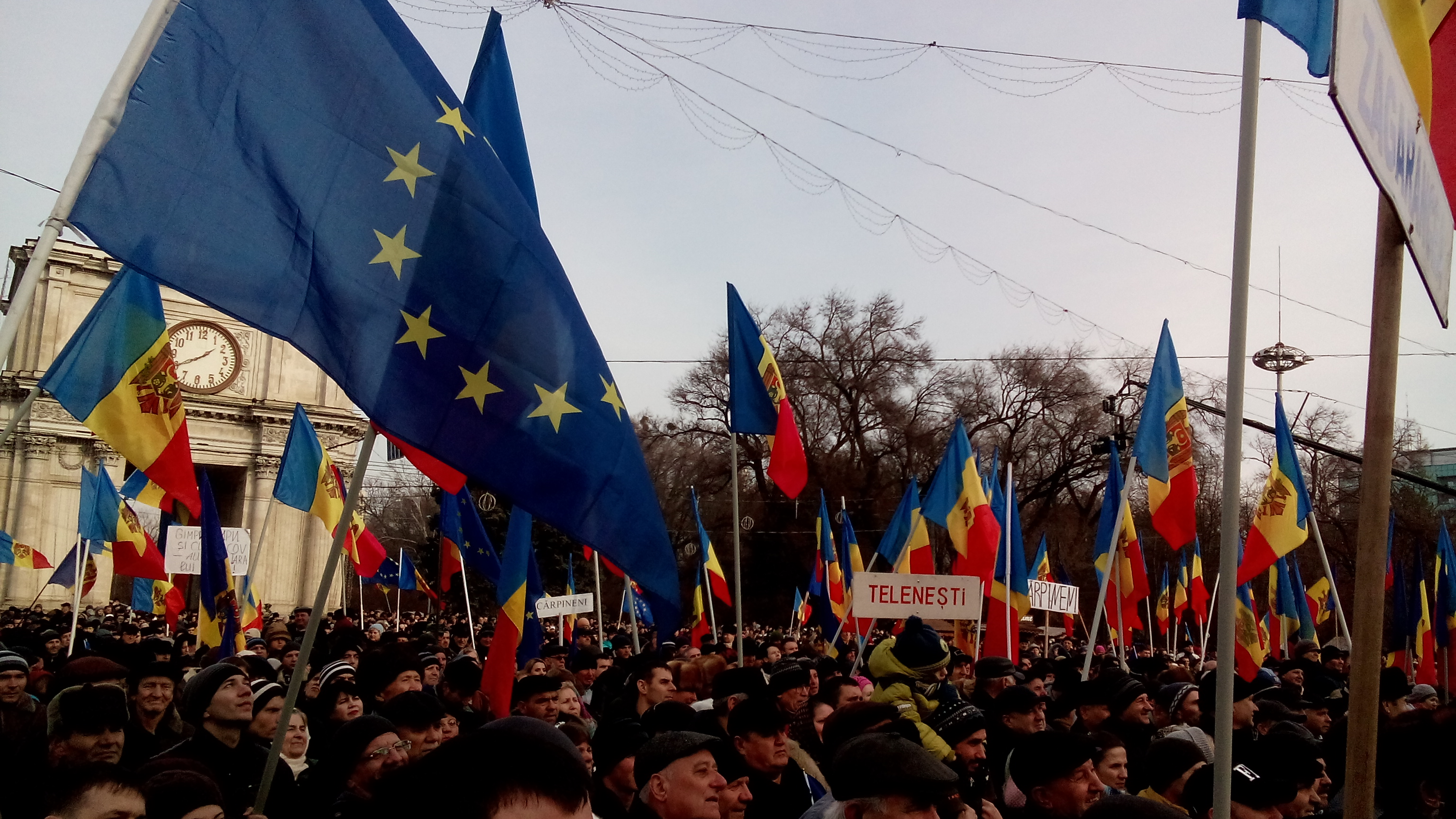
Mass protests in 2016.

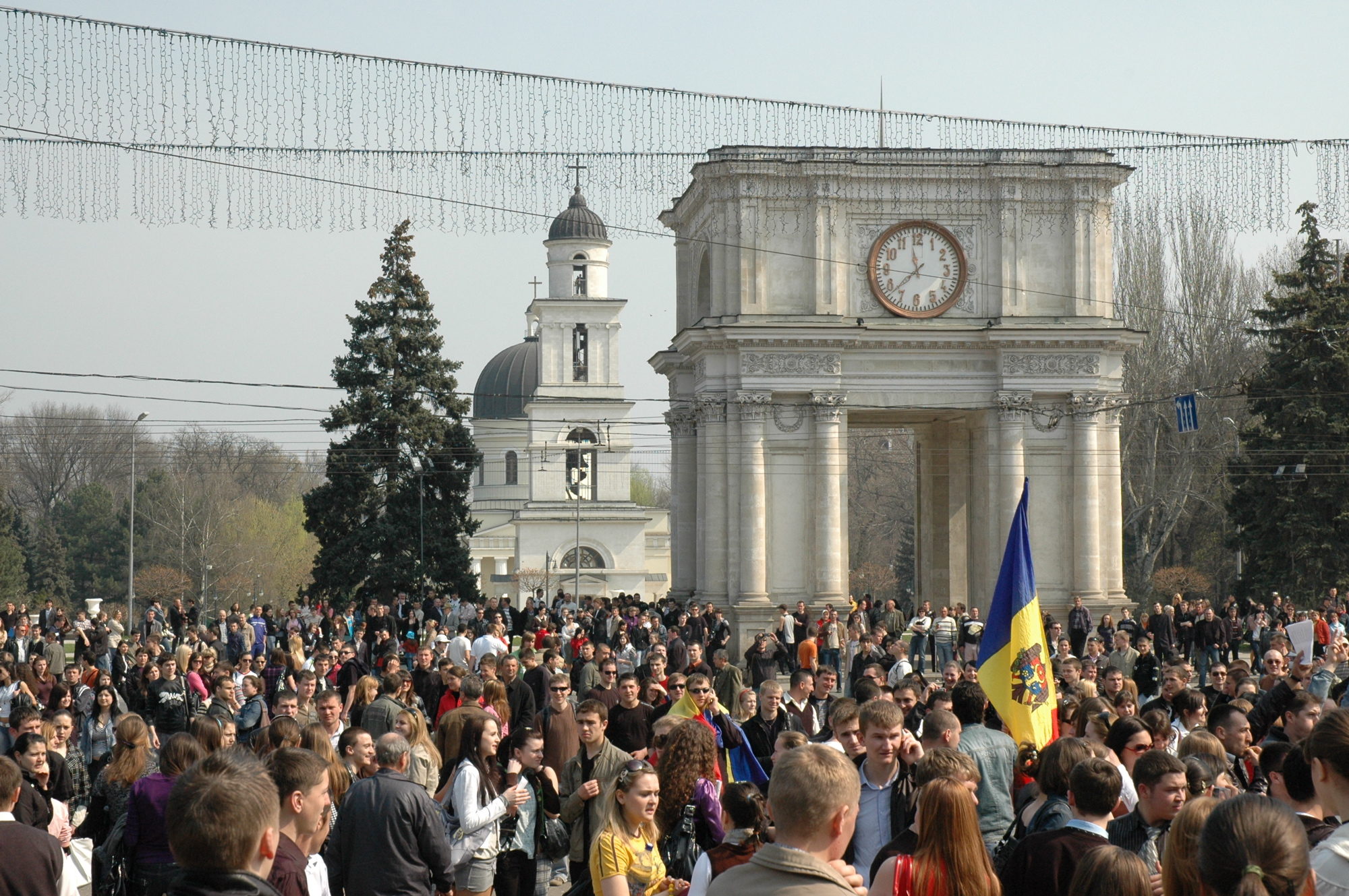
Protests in 2009

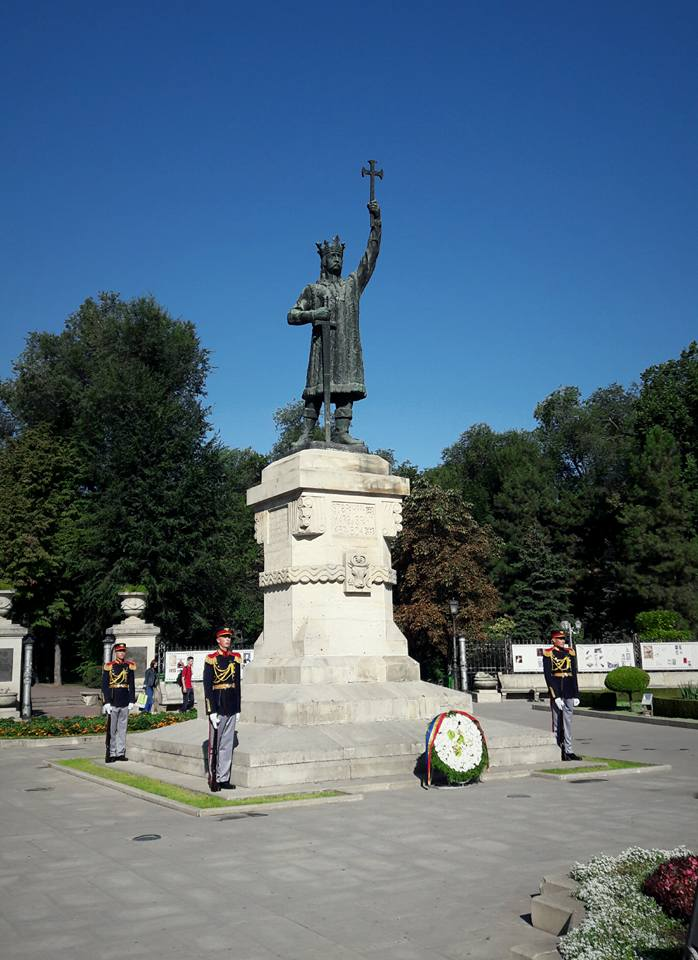
Stephen the Great Monument

== See also ==
- Red Square
- Victory Square, Minsk
- Maidan Nezalezhnosti
- Piața Constituției
