= Rădulenii Vechi =

- Village
- Location within Moldova
- Coordinates: 47.9833333333°N 28.2630555556°E
- Country: Moldova
- District: Florești District

Government
  - Mayor: Iurie Radu (PPRM)

Population (2014 census)
  - Total: 1,272
- Time zone: UTC+2 (EET)
  - Summer (DST): UTC+3 (EEST)

Rădulenii Vechi is a village in Florești District, Moldova.
