= Georgeta Snegur =

Moldovan socialite (1937–2019)

First Lady of Moldova
- In role 3 September 1990 – 15 January 1997
- President: Mircea Snegur
- Preceded by: Role established
- Succeeded by: Antonina Lucinschi

Personal details
- Born: 23 April 1937 Bucharest, Kingdom of Romania
- Died: 23 December 2019 (aged 82) Chișinău, Moldova
- Spouse: Mircea Snegur (m. 1960)
- Children: 2, including Natalia Gherman

Georgeta Snegur (23 April 1937 – 23 December 2019) was the inaugural First Lady of Moldova from 1990 to 1997 as the wife of President Mircea Snegur.

== Personal life and death ==
In 1960, she married Mircea Snegur (17 January 1940 – 13 September 2023) and had a daughter, Natalia Gherman, and a son. She died on 23 December 2019 at the age of 82. She was buried on 25 December at the Central Cemetery of Chișinău.
