= Dina Ghimpu =

First Lady of Moldova
- In role 11 September 2009 – 28 December 2010
- President: Mihai Ghimpu (acting)
- Preceded by: Taisia Voronin
- Succeeded by: Sanda Filat

Personal details
- Born: 12 June 1957 (age 68) Moldavian SSR, Soviet Union (now Moldova)
- Spouse: Mihai Ghimpu

Dina Ghimpu (born 27 June 1957) is the wife of the former Acting President of Moldova Mihai Ghimpu and is a former First Lady of Moldova.

She and former President Ghimpu have no children.

== Biography ==
She was born in June 1957. According to her, she and her husband in the early stages of her marriage "got divorced 10 times a day", also describing how they lived separately for six months, concluding that "this happens in all young couples".

From 1980 to 1986, she was a senior official at the Museum of Ethnography and Natural History of Moldova. In 1986, she became the head of Scientific Research at the Theatrical Museum of People's Theater. From 1992, she was a consultant at the Art Directorate of the Ministry of Culture and Tourism, and would keep that job for 17 years. She has been the Head of the General Directorate of Strategies and Cultural Policies of the Ministry of Culture since 2010. She was awarded the Order of Labor Glory by President Nicolae Timofti on 27 June 2012. According to the text of the decree, Ghimpu was awarded “for many years of fruitful work in the field of culture, contribution to the promotion of national values and high professional skills”.
