= Ukraine–Commonwealth of Independent States relations =

- Ukraine: CIS

Relations between Ukraine and the Commonwealth of Independent States (CIS) are multilateral international relations between a third state and a supranational organization.

Following the dissolution of the Soviet Union (USSR), the 1991 Belovezh Accords confirmed the breakup and established the CIS as a successor entity. Belarus, Russia and Ukraine were the signatories. Ukraine is a founding member of the CIS, although since it did not sign or ratify the subsequent CIS Charter (finalized in 1993) it thus has never been a member of the CIS. Nonetheless, Ukraine participated in various CIS bodies until severing these relations in 2018 due to the protracted Russo-Ukrainian War. Ukraine remains a member of the Commonwealth of Independent States Free Trade Area.

After the 2022 Russian invasion of Ukraine, Russia–Ukraine relations were completely broken off. Due to Belarusian involvement in the invasion, Belarus–Ukraine relations deteriorated extremely. Moreover, Ukraine began intensive denunciation of various agreements with the CIS due to European integration and the process of joining the European Union.

== History ==
=== Belovezh Agreement and Alma-Ata Protocol ===
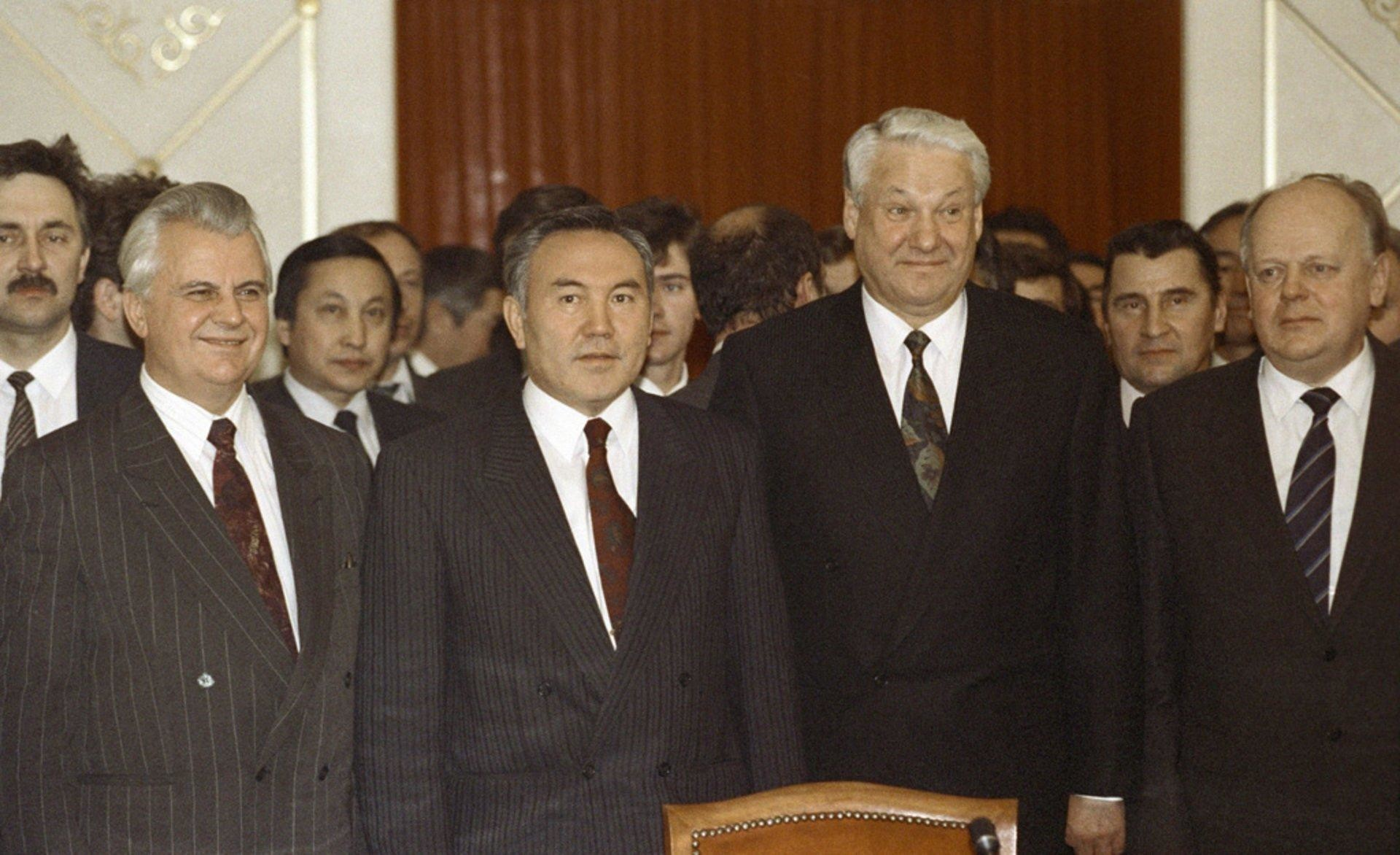
Signing of the Protocol on the Creation of the CIS, Almaty, Kazakhstan

On 7–8 December 1991, the chairman of the Supreme Council of Belarus Stanislaŭ Šuškievič, the President of the Russian Federation Boris Yeltsin and the President of Ukraine Leonid Kravchuk met on the territory of the Republic of Belarus, in the Biełaviežskaja Pušča near Brest. The result of this summit was the official confirmation of the dissolution of the Soviet Union and an agreement (the Belovezh Accords) on the formation of the Commonwealth of Independent States (CIS). On 21 December 1991, at a meeting in Almaty, the leaders of Ukraine, Russia, Belarus, Azerbaijan, Armenia, Moldova, Kazakhstan, Kyrgyzstan, Turkmenistan, Uzbekistan, and Tajikistan signed the Alma-Ata Protocol on the formation of the CIS.

Ukraine developed cooperation with the CIS states on the basis of the agreement and protocol, subject to reservations expressed by the Verkhovna Rada (parliament of Ukraine) "concerning Ukraine's conclusion of the Agreement", expressed in a 20 December 1991 statement which provided its official interpretation of and reservations toward the agreement:

1. According to its legal status, Ukraine is and remains an independent state – a subject of international law.
2. Ukraine denies the transformation of the CIS into a state entity with its own authorities and administration.
3. Ukraine denies granting the CIS the status of a subject of international law.
4. Coordinating institutes within the framework of the commonwealth cannot have an authoritative character, their decisions are advisory.
5. Carrying out foreign policy independently, Ukraine will enter into consultations with other states of the commonwealth.
6. The border between Ukraine on the one hand and Russia and Belarus on the other is the state border of Ukraine, which is inviolable.
7. Ukraine will create its own armed forces based on that of the former USSR located on its territory.
8. Ukraine will strive to acquire the status of a nuclear-free state by destroying all nuclear arsenals under effective international control and, based on the Declaration on State Sovereignty of Ukraine, will not join military blocs.
9. The presence of strategic armed forces on the territory of Ukraine is temporary. Their legal status and term of stay on the territory of Ukraine should be determined by the law of Ukraine and a special intergovernmental agreement concluded between the states on the territory of which the nuclear weapons of the former USSR are located.
10. Ukraine will create its own open economic system by introducing its own currency, creating its own banking and customs systems, developing its own transport and communication systems, as well as participating in regional and interregional markets.
11. Disputes regarding the interpretation and application of the provisions of the agreement will be resolved by Ukraine through negotiations on the basis of international law.
12. Ukraine reserves the right not only to suspend, but also to terminate its participation in the agreement or its individual articles.
13. Ukraine guarantees the fulfillment of international obligations arising for it from the treaties of the former USSR, in accordance with its national legislation.

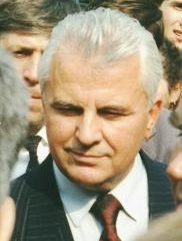
Leonid Kravchuk, the first president of independent Ukraine

At a press conference in Almaty on 21 December 1991, Leonid Kravchuk answered the journalist's question “Question to all (heads of state). Why did you refuse the name Commonwealth of Euro-Asian and Independent States?” as follows: “The fact is that the beginning of the Commonwealth and the foundation of the Commonwealth was laid in Minsk and the corresponding name was given to the Commonwealth there. After that three states - Belarus, Russia, Ukraine - have already ratified these documents. Therefore, it would be unreasonable to change the name both legally and politically.” Nursultan Nazarbayev immediately added: “But in the Declaration, which you will read tomorrow, the economic area is called Eurasian.” Answering the journalist's question about the “amendments made by the Ukrainian Parliament” to the Belovezha Agreement, Leonid Kravchuk replied: “According to the Vienna Convention, any document signed by a head of state is binding on that state, as well as the amendments made by the parliaments of a state during ratification of this document are binding, so in this case both documents are in force: the Belarusian document signed by me and others, and the amendments made by the parliaments.

According to the Vienna Convention on the Law of Treaties:

- A State may, when signing, ratifying, accepting, approving or acceding to a treaty, formulate a reservation
- A reservation expressly authorized by a treaty does not require any subsequent acceptance by the other contracting States unless the treaty so provides
- When it appears from the limited number of the negotiating States and the object and purpose of a treaty that the application of the treaty in its entirety between all the parties is an essential condition of the consent of each one to be bound by the treaty, a reservation requires acceptance by all the parties.
- When a treaty is a constituent instrument of an international organization and unless it otherwise provides, a reservation requires the acceptance of the competent organ of that organization
- A reservation is considered to have been accepted by a State if it shall have raised no objection to the reservation by the end of a period of twelve months after it was notified of the reservation or by the date on which it expressed its consent to be bound by the treaty, whichever is later

According to the information from the depository of the international agreement published on the Unified Register of Legal Acts and Other Documents of the Commonwealth of Independent States (under the executive committee of the Commonwealth of Independent States) as of 2024, Ukraine has not made any reservations or sent any notifications other than the ratification of the Agreement on 10 December 1991 in its entirely and without reservations, and the Agreement itself remains in force for Ukraine without reservations as of 2024.

=== Charter: Ukraine does not recognize the international legal personality ===
The Ministry of Foreign Affairs of Ukraine noted in 2012 that “the CIS was created after the dissolution of the USSR by signing the Agreement on the Creation of the Commonwealth of Independent States on 8 December 1991. This agreement was ratified by the Verkhovna Rada of Ukraine on 10 December 1991 with reservations set out in the Statement of the Verkhovna Rada of Ukraine of 20 December 1991. According to the Statement, in particular, “Ukraine denies the transformation of the Commonwealth of Independent States into a supranational entity with its own authorities and governance”, “...denies granting the Commonwealth of Independent States the status of a subject of international law”, “Coordination institutions within the Commonwealth cannot have a mandatory character, and their decisions are advisory”.

On 22 January 1993, the CIS Charter was adopted. Since Ukraine does not recognize the international legal personality of the CIS, Ukraine has not signed the CIS Charter. Therefore, Ukraine is not a member state, but has the status of a founding member state and a participating state of the CIS.”

=== 1990s ===
CIS member states closely cooperate in the field of international legal assistance and cooperation. In particular, on 22 January 1993, the heads of the CIS member states, including Ukraine, signed the Convention on Legal Assistance and Legal Relations in Civil, Family and Criminal Matters, and on 29 March 1997, the protocol to it.

After the collapse of the USSR, a number of environmental problems escalated from domestic to international in nature and required the coordination of efforts by the newly independent states. In this regard, the CIS states concluded a number of international agreements on the implementation of joint environmental protection measures, and the provision of mutual assistance in responding to environmental disasters and other emergency situations. Among the agreements Ukraine signed were the Agreement on Cooperation in the Field of Ecology and Environmental Protection (1992), the agreement on cooperation in the field of conservation and use of genetic resources of cultivated plants (1999), and the agreement on cooperation in the field of training specialists in radioecology, radiation safety, radiobiology and related sciences (2000).

Ukraine prioritized economic cooperation within the CIS. The basic documents on economic issues within the Commonwealth are the Agreement on the Establishment of the Economic Union (1993) and the Agreement on the Creation of a Free Trade Zone (1999). Ukraine did not sign the former of these, which has the aim of integrating the economies of members and creating a single customs and currency area. However, with the consent of the members, Ukraine became an associate member to the Economic Union on 15 April 1994, assuming only part of the treaty's obligations.

=== 2000s ===
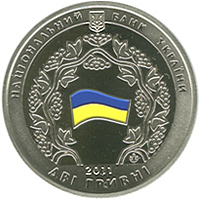
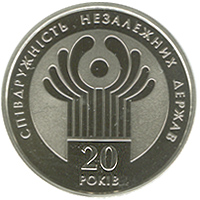
Jubilee coin of the National Bank of Ukraine, dedicated to the 20th anniversary of the CIS

On 7 October 2002, Ukraine signed a new version of the Convention on Legal Assistance and Legal Relations in Civil, Family, and Criminal Matters at a meeting of the Council of Heads of State of the CIS.

Ukraine proposed specific priority tasks to develop in 2003 for economic cooperation between CIS member states:

- complete the legal registration of the free trade zone and organize its regulatory and legal framework;
- start using the basic norms and rules of free trade, analyze the application of norms regarding the free trade zone in the legislation of the participating states;
- carry out constant monitoring of processes;
- complete the development of agreements that regulate trade in services, provision of trade subsidies, transport infrastructure in international transport corridors, as well as concepts of transport policy and cooperation in the currency sphere.

That year, the chairmanship of the Council of Heads of State of the CIS was carried out by President of Ukraine Leonid Kuchma.

=== Early 2010s ===
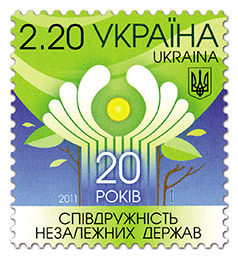
Postage stamp "20th anniversary of the Commonwealth of Independent States" of Ukrposhta, 2011

The following was published on the website of the Ministry of Foreign Affairs of Ukraine as of 2012: “In general, Ukraine refrains from any actions within the CIS, if it does not correspond to the course of our country towards integration into the European political, economic and legal space. At the same time, in matters of multilateral cooperation with the CIS participating states, which meet Ukraine's national interests and are organically combined with Ukraine's course towards European integration, our state's position is quite active.” The Ministry noted that in 2011 “on the initiative of Ukraine, more than a dozen significant CIS events were held on the territory of our country: a meeting of the CIS Council of Foreign Ministers, a meeting of the CIS Economic Council with the Yalta Business Meetings business forum, the Sixth Forum of Creative and Scientific Intelligentsia of the CIS, the International Innovation Forum, meetings of many CIS sectoral bodies. Recently, Ukraine has been participating in all meetings of the CIS governing bodies at the highest possible level, joined the Rules of Procedure of the CIS supreme bodies and the Regulation on the National Coordinator, appointed the National Coordinator, resumed participation in the CIS Observer Mission to elections and referendums, joined some sectoral cooperation bodies and revised reservations to a number of CIS documents.”

In 2011, Ukraine signed 15 interstate and 36 intergovernmental documents within the CIS, including the Free Trade Area Treaty; the Program of Innovation Cooperation until 2020; the Framework Program in the field of nuclear energy use until 2020 “Atom-CIS Cooperation”; the decision to establish the Council for Cooperation in Fundamental Sciences; measures to mark the Year of Food Security in 2011; the Program of Cooperation in Combating Illegal Migration for 2012–2014; the Concept of Cooperation in the Field of Culture.

On 8 April 2013, First Deputy Prime Minister of Ukraine Serhii Arbuzov was appointed the National Coordinator of Ukraine for cooperation within the CIS, as well as the representative of Ukraine in the Economic Council of the CIS.

The Council of Heads of State of the CIS appointed Ukraine to preside over the CIS in 2014. Ukraine set priorities for the CIS for that year in foreign policy, economic, humanitarian, scientific, technical, transportation, energy, and security, based on the principles of equality, partnership and good-neighbour relations between CIS member states.

=== Early Russo-Ukrainian War ===
Ukraine called an extraordinary meeting of the Council of Ministers of Foreign Affairs of the CIS, to be held in Kyiv on 7 March 2014, for the purpose of adopting a statement on the situation in parts of Ukraine, including the Autonomous Republic of Crimea (ARC). This was prompted by escalating Russian aggression, including threats to violate the territorial integrity of Ukraine, the use of Russian Armed Forces in the ARC, the announcement of an illegal referendum on the independence of Crimea and other illegal actions. However, the Commonwealth of Independent States, unlike other international organizations (United Nations, European Union, Council of Europe, Organization for Security and Co-operation in Europe), avoided making responsible political decisions regarding the basic principles of the Commonwealth's existence. As such, on 13 March, Ukraine announced its termination of the CIS presidency and the following month reduced its cooperation in the CIS to a minimum. Ukraine withdrew from a number of multilateral agreements within the framework of the CIS and ceased membership in many bodies of industry cooperation.

As of 2019, Ukraine had minimized its participation in the Commonwealth to the critically necessary minimum. A review of the 236 CIS agreements Ukraine had joined was ongoing, with the aim of denouncing them. Ukraine was invited to attend in a meeting of the Council of Heads of State of the CIS in October 2019, but did not respond to the invitation.

In the following years, Ukraine ceased participation in CIS agreements on veterinary medicine, sanitation of territories, plant quarantines, and the use of common airspace. In 2022, the Verkhovna Rada supported the termination of participation in the CIS anti-terrorist center and agreements on tariffs and country of origin.

=== After the Russian invasion of Ukraine ===
The Russian invasion of Ukraine resulted in Russia–Ukraine relations becoming completely broken. Belarus, being an ally to the Russian Federation, allowed the use of its land in the war, which in turn, also caused Belarus–Ukraine relations to extremely deteriorate. Moreover, Ukraine began intensive denunciation of various agreements with the CIS due to European integration and the process of accession of Ukraine to the European Union.

On 22 May 2022, the Verkhovna Rada adopted four draft laws on the denunciation of agreements with the CIS: on agreements on the common agricultural market, on avoiding double taxation, on countering illegal migration, and on perpetuating the memory of the courage and heroism of the peoples of the CIS in WWII ("Great Patriotic War").

In June, Ukraine withdrew from CIS agreements on establishing mechanisms to settle economic disputes, use of cellular mobile communications, animal protection, intergovernmental field service communication protocols, support and development of small businesses, and on scientific and technical cooperation. In July 2022, Ukraine adopted a law on withdrawal from the CIS agreement on cooperation in customs matters.

== The status of Ukraine in the CIS ==
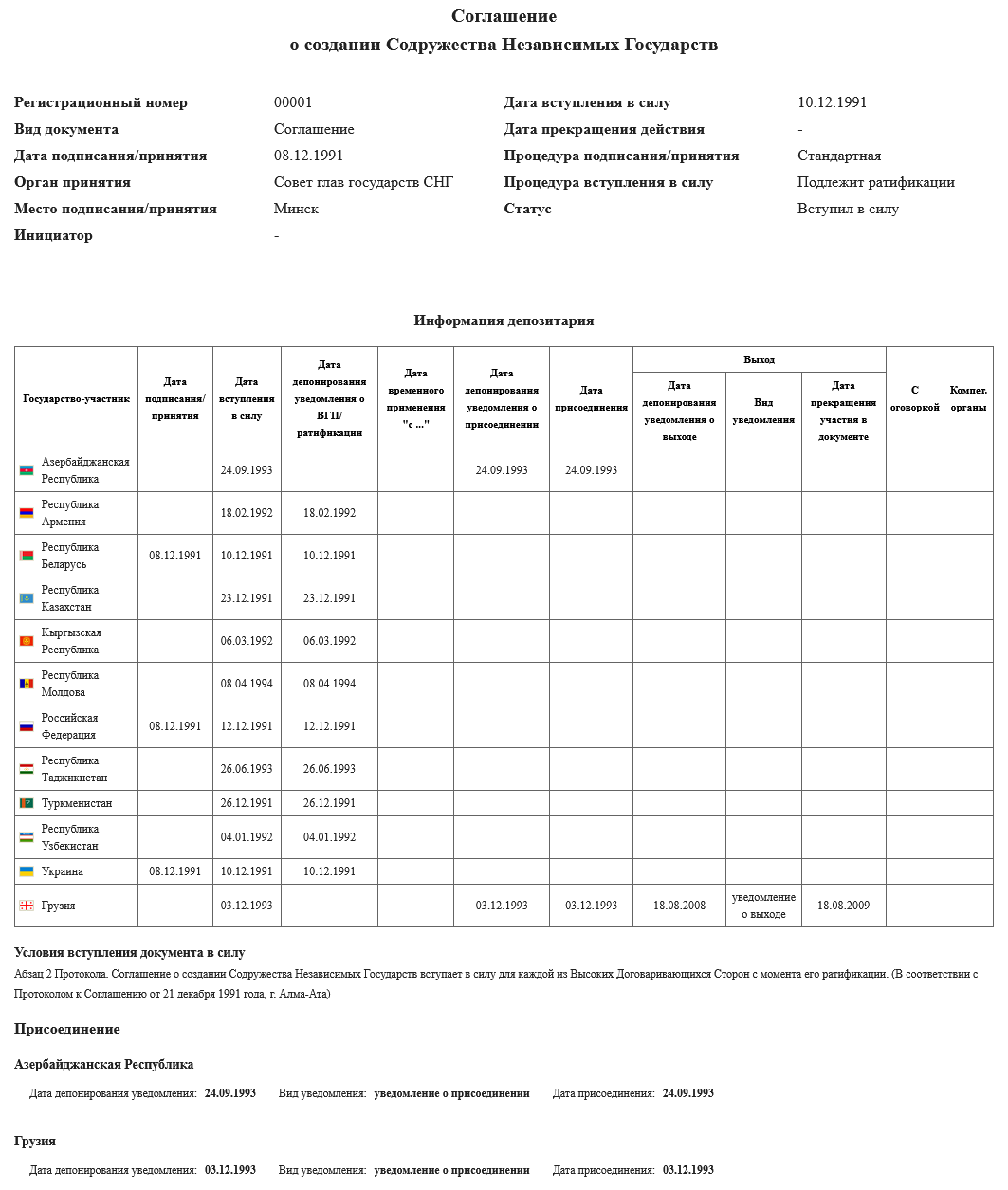
The Agreement on the Creation of the Commonwealth of Independent States dated 8 December 1991. The information from the depository of the international agreement published on the Unified Register of Legal Acts and Other Documents of the Commonwealth of Independent States (under the executive committee of the Commonwealth of Independent States) as of 2024.

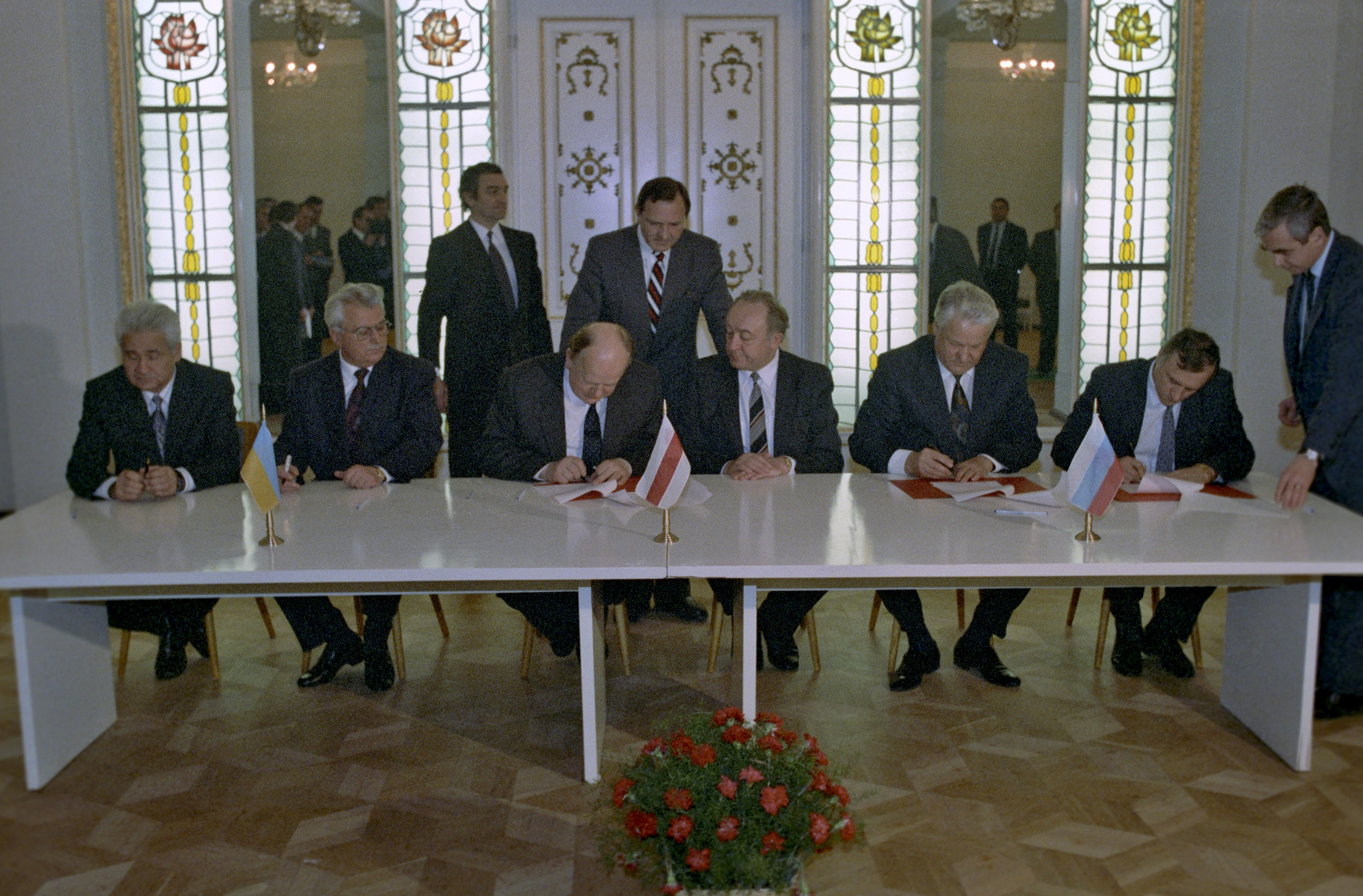
Signing of the Belovezh Accords between the Republic of Belarus, the Russian Federation and Ukraine

Ukraine submitted its notification of ratification of the Creation Agreement on 10 December 1991. As of 2024 the depository does not contain any reservations or notification from Ukraine on withdrawal, and the agreement remains in force for Ukraine. The only notification of withdrawal was sent by Georgia in 2008, which ceased to be part of the CIS one year after the notification in 2009.

Ukraine did not sign the CIS Charter, which was adopted by CIS member states on 22 January 1993. Article 7 of the Charter defines founding states of the CIS as "the states that signed and ratified the Agreement on the Establishment of the CIS and the Protocol thereto" and member states as "those founding states that undertake obligations under the CIS Charter within one year after its adoption by the Council of Heads of State." Ukraine is thus a CIS founding state but not a member state.

Article 8 of the charter allows for a state to join the CIS as an associate member, participating in certain types of activities, on the unanimous approval of the Council of Heads of State. Ukraine did not sign the charter, so is not bound by its articles, while the Belovezh Accords and Alma-Ata Protocol which Ukraine did sign make no mention of associate membership.

According to the website of the CIS Executive Committee, the Charter does not define any differences in the legal status between the founding state and the member state. Currently, only Turkmenistan and Ukraine, which have not signed or ratified the decision on the Charter, are founding states, but not members of the CIS, which does not prevent them from participating in the activities of the Commonwealth. This circumstance has led to the fact that in agreements and decisions adopted within the framework of the Commonwealth, the term "participating State" is used, extending the legal norms of the Charter to both the Member States and the founding States.

On March 31, 1994, the Economic Court of the CIS decided that the 1991 agreements are primary in relation to the CIS charter, and the CIS charter itself does not change the conditions of those 11 countries that have become co-founders of the CIS after they ratified the 1991 agreements. It is the agreements of 1991 that are the constituent documents of the Commonwealth, but the Charter is not.

The Ministry of Foreign Affairs of Ukraine noted in 2012 that “the main areas of multilateral cooperation within the CIS for Ukraine were and remain, first of all, economic, social, humanitarian, and the fight against new challenges and threats”.

Ukraine ceased its participation in the statutory bodies of the CIS in 2018 due to the protracted Russo-Ukrainian War, although it remains a member of the Commonwealth of Independent States Free Trade Area.

=== Exit of Ukraine from the CIS ===
To fully terminate its relationship with the CIS, Ukraine would need to legally withdraw from the Creation Agreement, which it has not done.

The question of Ukraine's membership in the CIS was first raised after Viktor Yushchenko's victory in the 2004 presidential election. In 2005, the Minister of Foreign Affairs of Ukraine Borys Tarasyuk noted that Ukraine's participation in the CIS is symbolic, and the very existence of the organization and its further development is very problematic. A similar point of view was expressed by the representatives of the Georgian, Moldovan and Azerbaijani governments. In July 2007, at a press conference, Yushchenko regarded the prospects of the CIS as a whole as pessimistic.

Another reason was the beginning of Russo-Ukrainian War in the Donbas. On 14 March 2014, a bill was introduced to Ukraine's parliament to denounce their ratification of the CIS Creation Agreement, but it did not go through all the necessary committee review procedures and did not proceed to a vote. Bills were also introduced later that year to suspend application of the Creation Agreement and invalidate the Verkhovna Rada's ratification of the agreement, but were not approved. On 19 March 2014, the National Security and Defense Council of Ukraine decided to start the procedure for leaving the CIS. On 30 April, the Ministry of Foreign Affairs of Ukraine announced that they had already prepared all the necessary documents regarding Ukraine's withdrawal from the CIS. After that, according to Deputy Minister of Foreign Affairs Danylo Lubkivskyi, the only thing necessary for Ukraine to leave this association is the appropriate law.

Following the 2014 parliamentary election, a new bill to denounce the CIS agreement was introduced.

In September 2015, the Ukrainian Ministry of Foreign Affairs confirmed Ukraine will continue taking part in the CIS "on a selective basis". Since that time, Ukraine has had no representatives in the CIS Executive Committee.

In April 2018, Ukrainian President Petro Poroshenko indicated that Ukraine would formally leave the CIS. As of 1 June 2018, the CIS secretariat had not received formal notice from Ukraine of its withdrawal from the CIS, a process that will take one year to complete, following notice being given.

On 19 May 2018, President of Ukraine Petro Poroshenko signed a decree on the final termination of Ukraine's participation in the statutory bodies of the CIS.

On March 26, 2019, the first Deputy Chairman of the Executive Committee - CIS Executive Secretary Viktor Guminsky said that Ukraine has not officially left the CIS. On April 16, 2019, Sergey Lebedev expressed hope that "Ukraine will return to active participation in the interaction of the Commonwealth countries." "Ukraine's participation in the Commonwealth will meet the interests of all Commonwealth countries, first of all Ukraine itself," Sergei Lebedev said.

Ukraine has further stated that it intends to review its participation in all CIS agreements and only continue in those which are in its interests. It has also withdrawn from various agreements adopted within the framework of the commonwealth, but continues to be a party to various other agreements. This is due to the fact that in the "post-Soviet space" some issues that are important to Ukrainians are regulated by CIS agreements. For example, pension provision, recognition of diplomas, legal aid, etc.

Ukraine does not need to leave the CIS – it has never been and is not now a member of this structure. Because – and this is the joke of the situation – Ukraine is the founder of the CIS, but was not a party to the Commonwealth. We did not sign the charter. Therefore, in fact, based on the CIS structures, we really completely, finally break with the CIS. As they say, this is the point of no return. There is basically no way back. Not politically, not mentally, not at all. And here there are no tricks on the part of Kyiv. And all these allusions to some legal and political problems are all "divorce" used in Moscow. Because they dream of somehow dragging us back.

— Pavlo Klimkin

In 2021, Sergei Lebedev said that Ukraine could withdraw from the Commonwealth of Independent States (CIS) only if it wanted to. "Ukraine refused to pay contributions — since 2013 we have not received any money from Ukraine. Despite the fact that Kiev does not pay contributions, the CIS countries do not plan to raise the issue of its exclusion from the organization. Although Ukraine has abandoned many formats of the commonwealth, it still participates in some of them. Non-payment of contributions may become the basis for the exclusion of the state from the CIS, but we do not want this. " he said. "Kiev does not participate in the statutory bodies of the CIS. Ukraine has now curtailed its practical participation in many commonwealth projects. But de jure Ukraine still remains in the commonwealth. Moreover, in the humanitarian sphere, it participates in some of our formats — not at a high level, but representatives of Ukraine come and participate in these events." Lebedev said.

In December 2022, the Deputy Chairman of the State Duma Committee on CIS Affairs, Konstantin Zatulin, noted that the Ukrainian authorities had not yet submitted an official application for withdrawal from the Commonwealth of Independent States. "Ukraine is a participant and founder of the CIS from December 8, 1991 to the present. Yes, indeed, we have repeatedly heard statements by some Ukrainian politicians about their intentions to withdraw from the commonwealth, but the CIS Executive Committee has not received any official documents on withdrawal," Sergei Lebedev stressed in December 2022.

On January 31, 2023, Sergei Lebedev again confirmed that Ukraine remains de jure part of the CIS, but withdrew from about 20% of the agreements and arrangements within the Commonwealth. Ukraine still remains in the remaining agreements. "Unfortunately, representatives of Ukraine do not participate in meetings of our structures, bodies - both higher bodies and in the work of industry councils. Ukraine has not yet submitted an official application to withdraw from the organization." he said.

In April 2023, Lebedev said that most CIS countries regret the curtailment and termination of Ukraine's interaction with the states of this association and "even more damage, as it seems to me, from the curtailment of ties was inflicted on Ukraine itself".

On 19 February 2024, Secretary General Sergey Lebedev once again confirmed that Ukraine remains a de jure part of the CIS. “In Ukraine, I have been hearing these statements about plans to leave the CIS for 10-15 years. Ukraine is still in the CIS. De jure Ukraine remains in the CIS,” Lebedev said.

On 18 June 2024, Secretary General Sergey Lebedev said “Both Ukraine, despite the special military operation, and Moldova officially stay legally - de jure within the CIS. And we all hope, not only in Russia, but also in the CIS Executive Committee, in other CIS countries, that reason will prevail and both Ukraine and Moldova will resume their active participation in the CIS framework”. "There are calls that Moldova should withdraw. But I want to say that in Kiev, too, for almost 20 years, such calls from politicians have been heard and continue to be heard," he said.

On 8 October 2024, Secretary General Sergey Lebedev at a meeting of the Council of Heads of state in front of all the presidents of the countries present, stated that "Ukraine and Moldova legally remain members of the CIS. They have not withdrawn from the Commonwealth, and both States still retain their participation in a number of treaties. As the Secretary General, who has been actively working with representatives of Ukraine and Moldova for many years, I would also like to express the hope that eventually everything will return to its place. Neighboring States should live in peace, friendship and cooperation. God himself told the neighbors to live and coexist in friendship."

“As the CIS secretary general, I would like to officially state: Ukraine legally remains a part of the CIS” Lebedev said at a briefing in Moscow on 15 October 2024.

As of 2026, Ukraine is listed as part of the CIS on the website of the CIS executive committee, with a flag, coat of arms and a photo of President Zelenskyy.

== Permanent Mission of Ukraine to the CIS Coordination Institutions ==
As of 2000, the Permanent Mission of Ukraine to the Coordination Institutions of the Commonwealth of Independent States was located in Minsk at 17 Kirova Street. The Permanent and Plenipotentiary Representative of Ukraine to the CIS Coordination Institutions in 2000 was Oleksandr Petrovych Danylchenko.

As of 2018, before Ukraine stopped participating in CIS, its permanent mission was located in Minsk at 51 Starovilenskaya Street. The acting Head of the Permanent Mission in 2018 was Olga Oleksiivna Daribogova. The official website was: http://cis.mfa.gov.ua

== See also ==
- Eurasianism
- Russian world
- Russification of Ukraine
- Russia–Ukraine relations
- Belarus–Ukraine relations
- NATO–Russia relations
- Accession of Ukraine to the European Union
- Ukraine–European Union relations
- Ukraine–NATO relations
