= Depositary =

Government or organization holding a multilateral treaty

In international law, a depositary is a government or organization to which a multilateral treaty is entrusted. The principal functions of a depositary are codified in Article 77 of the Vienna Convention on the Law of Treaties.

== Belarus ==
The phrase “A true copy shall be kept in the Archives of the Government of the Republic of Belarus, which shall send to the Contracting Parties which have signed this Agreement (or the Treaty or the Protocol) a certified copy thereof” is contained in numerous documents of the Commonwealth of Independent States, in particular in the Protocol to the Agreement on the Creation of the Commonwealth of Independent States, the Charter of the Commonwealth of Independent States, the Agreement on the Status of the Economic Court of the Commonwealth of Independent States, the Treaty on the Creation of the Economic Union and the Agreement on the Creation of a Free Trade Area of 1994.

== Belgium ==
Belgium's Ministry of Foreign Affairs serves as the depositary for multilateral treaties such as the treaty establishing Eurocontrol.

== Canada ==
Canada's Global Affairs Canada Treaty Law Division serves as the depositary for multilateral treaties such as the Arctic Search and Rescue Agreement. Canada is also one of two depositaries for the Treaty on Open Skies along with Hungary.

== France ==
France's Ministry of Foreign and European Affairs serves as the depositary for multilateral treaties such as the Geneva Protocol.

== Italy ==
Italy's Ministry of Foreign Affairs serves as the depositary for multilateral treaties such as the Treaty of Rome, which established the European Economic Community (a predecessor to the European Union).

== New Zealand ==
New Zealand's Ministry of Foreign Affairs and Trade serves as the depositary for multilateral treaties such as the Trans-Pacific Strategic Economic Partnership Agreement and Trans-Pacific Partnership.

== Russia ==
Russia's Ministry of Foreign Affairs serves as the depositary for multilateral treaties such as the Biological Weapons Convention, Nuclear Non-Proliferation Treaty and Partial Nuclear Test Ban Treaty.

== Switzerland ==
Switzerland's Federal Department of Foreign Affairs of Switzerland serves as the depositary for 78 multilateral treaties including the Geneva Conventions.

== United Kingdom ==
The United Kingdom's Foreign, Commonwealth and Development Office currently acts as the depositary for documents such as Agreement on the Rescue of Astronauts, the Return of Astronauts and the Return of Objects Launched into Outer Space, Constitution of UNESCO, and the Convention on the Prohibition of the Development, Production and Stockpiling of Bacteriological (Biological) and Toxin Weapons and on their Destruction. Public copies are supplied by The Stationery Office and the British Library.

== United States ==
The United States Department of State is currently the depositary for more than 200 multilateral treaties, including the Charter of the United Nations, Convention on International Civil Aviation, North Atlantic Treaty, Statute of the International Atomic Energy Agency, Treaty on Principles Governing the Activities of States in the Exploration and Use of Outer Space, including the Moon and Other Celestial Bodies, and the Treaty on the Non-proliferation of Nuclear Weapons. Generally, the United States executes its responsibilities in accordance with the will of each individual treaty or, in lieu of such provision, as per the Vienna Convention on the Law of Treaties. Most treaties for which the United States is the depositary government are held by the U.S. National Archives and Records Administration.

== United Nations Secretary-General ==
The United Nations Secretary-General serves as the depositary for numerous multilateral treaties, including the Chemical Weapons Convention, Comprehensive Nuclear-Test-Ban Treaty, Rome Statute of the International Criminal Court and United Nations Framework Convention on Climate Change.
