= Council of Heads of State of the CIS =

Russian coverning group

- Совет глав государств СНГ
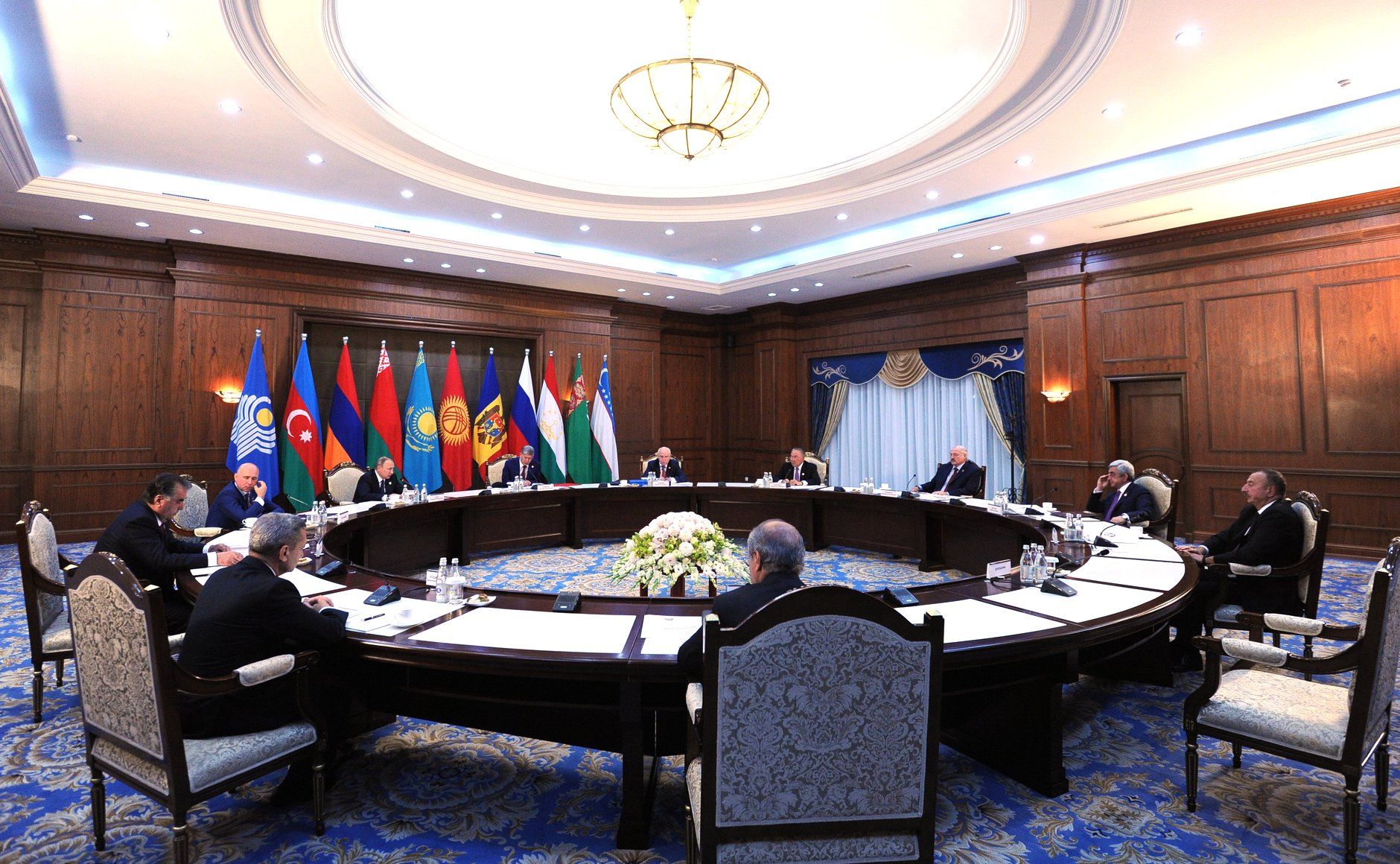
- Council meeting on September 16, 2016 in Bishkek, Kyrgyzstan.

Agency overview
- Formed: 26 December 1991
- Preceding agency: State Council of the Soviet Union
- Jurisdiction: Commonwealth of Independent States

The Council of Heads of State of the CIS (Russian: Совет глав государств СНГ), abbreviated in the Russian language as the SGG (СГГ), is a working body in the Commonwealth of Independent States (CIS). It serves as the supreme body of the CIS, and includes all the heads of state of CIS member states. Regular meetings of the council are held annually. It was created following the dissolution of the Soviet Union in 1991, directly replacing the State Council of the Soviet Union. As of 2026, there are 9 members of the CIS: Armenia, Azerbaijan, Belarus, Kazakhstan, Kyrgyzstan, Moldova, Russia, Tajikistan, and Uzbekistan. Moldova's membership will be terminated on 8 April 2027.

== Activities ==
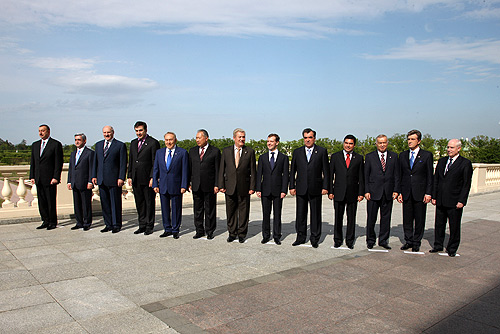
The 2008 CIS heads of state summit family photo at Konstantin Palace in Strelna.

The activities of the Council of Heads of State are governed by the agreement on the establishment of the Commonwealth of Independent States of 8 December 1991 and the CIS Charter of 22 January 1993. At its meetings, the Council of Heads of State make decisions concerning amendments to the CIS Charter, the creation or abolition of bodies of the CIS, and optimizing the structure of the CIS, among others. Decisions of the Council of Heads of State are taken by consensus, with any member state having the ability to declare its disinterest in a particular issue.

== Current members ==
Country	Leader	Term start
Armenia	Prime Minister Nikol Pashinyan	8 May 2018
Azerbaijan	President Ilham Aliyev	31 October 2003
Belarus	President Alexander Lukashenko	20 July 1994
Kazakhstan	President Kassym-Jomart Tokayev	20 March 2019
Kyrgyzstan	President Sadyr Japarov	28 January 2021
Russia	President Vladimir Putin	7 May 2012
Tajikistan	President Emomali Rahmon	20 November 1992
Turkmenistan	President Serdar Berdimuhamedow	19 March 2022
Uzbekistan	President Shavkat Mirziyoyev	14 December 2016

== Chairmen ==
The chairmanship of the council rotates every year to the leader of a member state. The chairman's host country gets to host the annual summit in their country (most likely their capital city). The chairmanship exists in accordance with regulations approved by the council in Dushanbe in October 2008. The following is a table of chairmen of the council.

Country	Chairman	Term
Russia	President Boris Yeltsin	1 January 1994 – 31 December 1999
Russia	President Vladimir Putin	25 January 2000 – 29 January 2003
Ukraine	President Leonid Kuchma	29 January 2003 – 16 September 2004
Russia	President Vladimir Putin	16 September 2004 – 20 May 2006
Kazakhstan	President Nursultan Nazarbayev	20 May 2006 – 5 October 2007
Kyrgyzstan	President Kurmanbek Bakiyev	5 October 2007 – 31 December 2008
Moldova (Note: Moldova was a member of the CIS from 1994 to 2027.)	President Vladimir Voronin	1 January – 11 September 2009
Moldova	Acting President Mihai Ghimpu	11 September – 31 December 2009
Russia	President Dmitry Medvedev	1 January – 31 December 2010
Tajikistan	President Emomali Rahmon	1 January – 31 December 2011
Turkmenistan	President Gurbanguly Berdimuhamedow	1 January – 31 December 2012
Belarus	President Alexander Lukashenko	1 January – 31 December 2013
Ukraine	President Viktor Yanukovych	1 January – 4 April 2014
Belarus	President Alexander Lukashenko	4 April – 31 December 2014
Kazakhstan	President Nursultan Nazarbayev	1 January – 31 December 2015
Kyrgyzstan	President Almazbek Atambayev	1 January – 31 December 2016
Russia	President Vladimir Putin	1 January – 31 December 2017
Tajikistan	President Emomali Rahmon	1 January – 31 December 2018
Turkmenistan	President Gurbanguly Berdimuhamedow	1 January – 31 December 2019
Uzbekistan	President Shavkat Mirziyoyev	1 January – 31 December 2020
Belarus	President Alexander Lukashenko	1 January – 31 December 2021
Kazakhstan	President Kassym-Jomart Tokayev	1 January – 31 December 2022
Kyrgyzstan	President Sadyr Japarov	1 January – 31 December 2023
Russia	President Vladimir Putin	1 January – 31 December 2024
Tajikistan	President Emomali Rahmon	1 January – 31 December 2025
Turkmenistan	Incumbent; President Serdar Berdimuhamedow	1 January – 31 December 2026

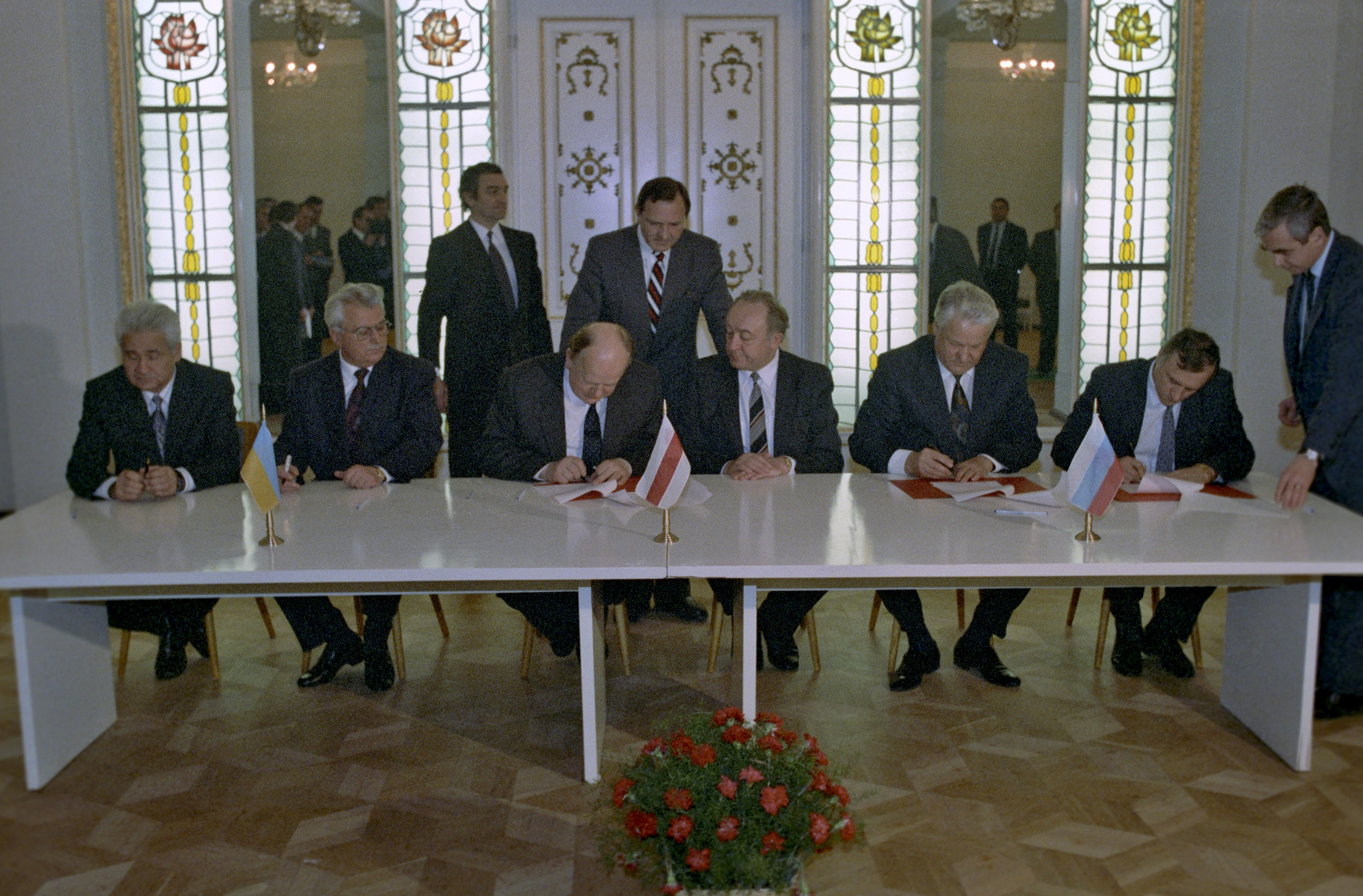
Boris Yeltsin, Leonid Kravchuk, and Stanislav Shushkevich signed the ceremony at the Viskuli Government House after the inaugural summit.

== Sessions ==
=== Early years ===
The first meeting was held in the Belarusian capital of Minsk, where the Belovezha Accords were signed at Viskuli Government House. In the Kazakh capital of Alma Ata on 21 December, the Alma-Ata Protocol was signed, in which a provisional agreement on the membership and conduct of Councils of Heads of State and Government was concluded, as well as an agreement on Strategic Forces, Armed Forces and Border Troops. Many military documents were signed at a supplementary summit on 30 December in Minsk.

=== Later summits ===
- 1994
  - Moscow (15 April)
  - Moscow (21 October)
- 1995
  - Alma-Ata (10 February)
  - Minsk (26 May)
- 1996
  - January 19 - Moscow (19 January)
  - Moscow (17 May)
- 1997
  - Moscow (28 March)
  - Chișinău (23 October)
- Moscow (29 April 1998)
- Moscow (2 April 1999)
- 2000
  - Moscow (25 January)
  - Moscow (21 June)
  - Minsk (1 December)
- 2001
  - Minsk (1 June)
  - Moscow (30 November)
- Chișinău (7 October 2002)
- Yalta (19 September 2003)
- Astana (16 September 2004)
- Kazan (26 August 2005)
- Minsk (28 November 2006)
- Dushanbe (5 October 2007)
- Bishkek (10 October 2008)
- Chișinău (9 October 2009)
- Moscow (10 October and 10 December 2010)
- 2011
  - Dushanbe (3 September)
  - Moscow (20 December)
- 2012
  - Moscow (15 May)
  - Ashgabat (5 December)
- Minsk (25 October 2013)
- Minsk (10 October 2014)
- Burabay National Park (16 October 2015)
- Chong-Aryk, Bishkek (16 September 2016)
- Sochi (11 October 2017)
- Dushanbe (1 June 2018)
- Ashgabat (2019)
- Tashkent (2020)

== See also ==
- Commonwealth of Independent States
- List of G7 leaders
