= List of international presidential trips made by Alexander Lukashenko =

Alexander Lukashenko, the first and only President of Belarus, has made several international visits since he assumed office on 20 July 1994.

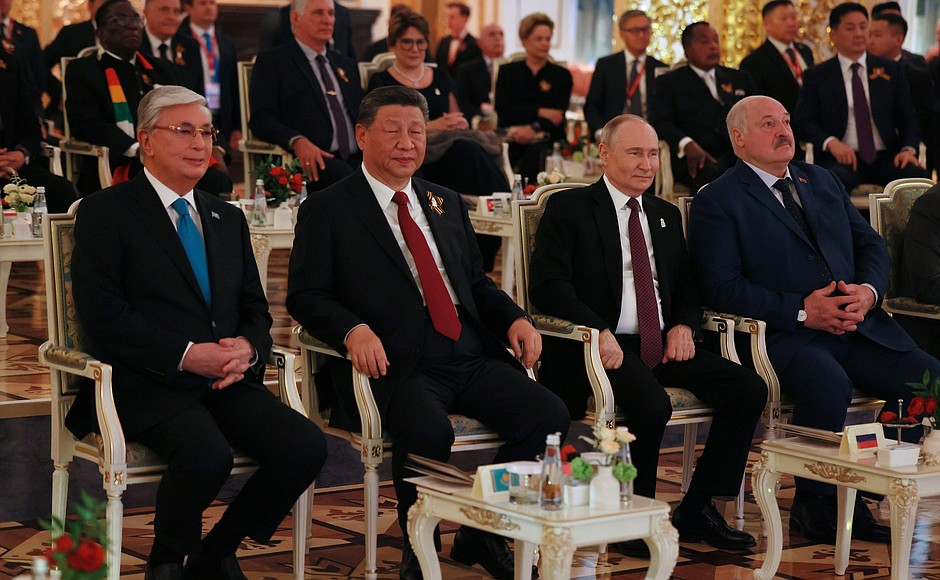
Alexander Lukashenko attending a concert hosted by Russian President Vladimir Putin in Moscow, Russia, 2025

World map highlighting countries visited by Alexander Lukashenko during his presidency One visit Two visits Three visits Four visits Five-nine visits Ten-twenty visits Hundred or more visits Belarus

== 1990s ==
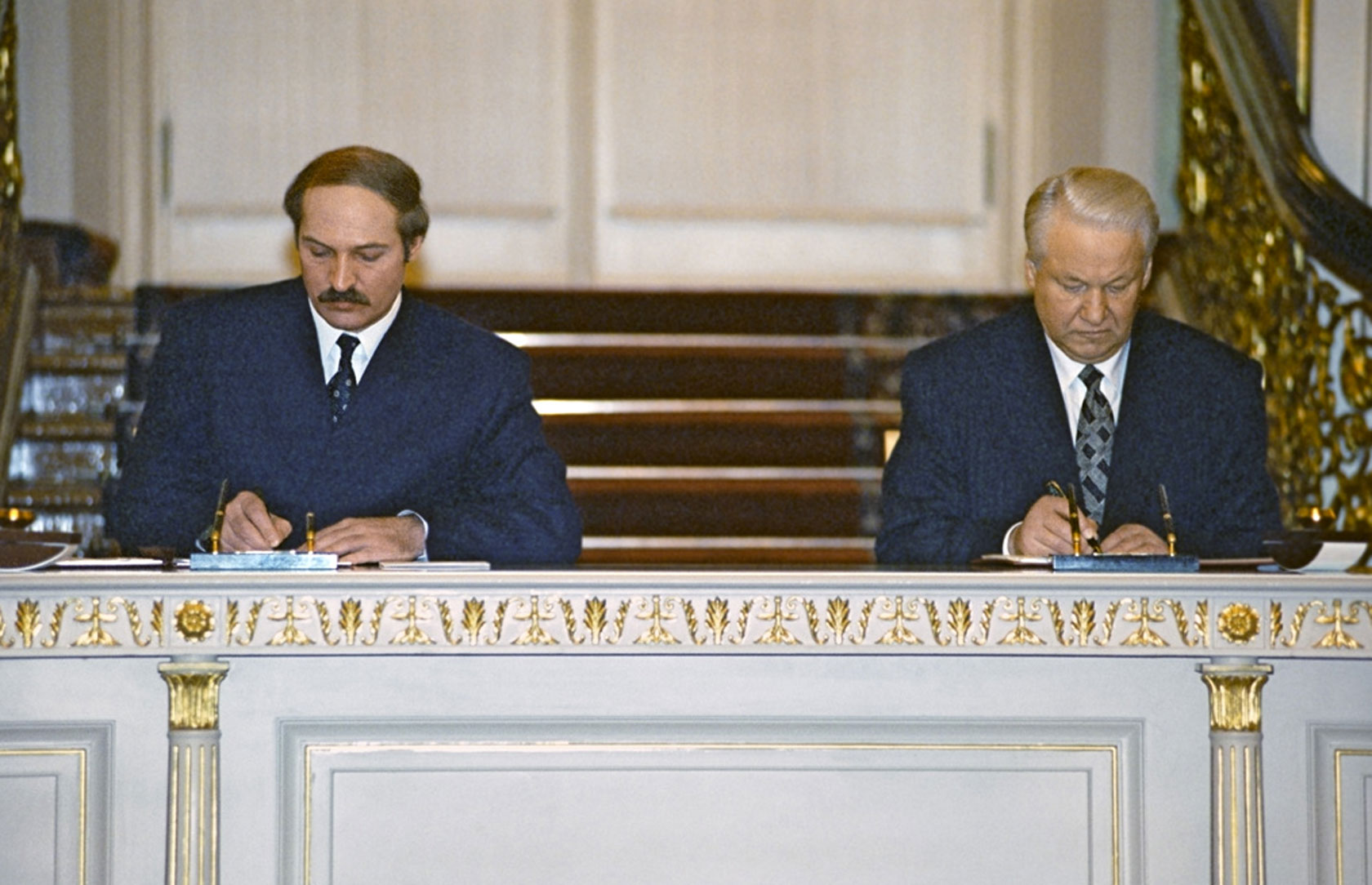
Official ceremony of signing Treaty on Establishing Russian-Belarusian Union at the Kremlin Palace, between the Russian president Boris Yeltsin and Belarusian president Lukashenko, 1997

=== 1994 ===
Country	Areas visited	Dates	Details
Russia	Moscow	3 August	Working visit. Met with President Boris Yeltsin and Prime Minister Viktor Chernomyrdin.
Russia	Moscow	21 October	Council of Heads of State of the CIS
Ukraine	Kyiv	8 October	Attended Liberation Day celebrations. Laid a wreath at the Tomb of the Unknown Soldier.
Uzbekistan	Tashkent	21-23 December	State visit.

=== 1995 ===
Country	Areas visited	Dates	Details
China	Beijing	January 16-19	State visit.
Lithuania	Vilnius	February 6-7	Official visit. Addressed the Seimas.
Belgium	Brussels	March 5–7	Working visit.
Denmark	Copenhagen	10-12 March	Attended the World Summit for Social Development.
Russia	Prokhorovka, Belgorod Oblast	May 3	Working visit.
Russia	Saint Petersburg	June 19-20	Working visit.
Moldova	Chișinău	September 11-13	State visit.
Russia	Moscow	August 3	Working visit.
United States	New York City	October 22	Working visit.

=== 1996 ===
Country	Areas visited	Dates	Details
Russia	Star City	January 1	Working visit.
Germany	Berlin	April 27	Working visit.
Russia	Moscow	February 27-March 4	Working visit.

=== 1997 ===
Country	Areas visited	Dates	Details
Russia	Moscow	April 1-2	
South Korea	Seoul	April 21-23	State visit.
Vietnam	Hanoi	April 23-26	State visit.
Ukraine	Kyiv	May 12-13	State visit.
India	Kolkata New Delhi	September 25-28	State visit.

=== 1998 ===
Country	Areas visited	Dates	Details
Serbia and Montenegro	Belgrade	January 28-30	State visit.
Iran	Tehran Kish Island	March 6-9	State visit.
Syria	Damascus	11-13 March	Official visit. Met with President Hafez al-Assad.
Germany	Salzgitter	April 22	Working visit.
Egypt	Cairo	June 15-16	State visit.

=== 1999 ===
Country	Areas visited	Dates	Details
Serbia and Montenegro	Belgrade	14 April	Official visit. Met with President Slobodan Milošević.
Russia	Kaliningrad Oblast	October 14-15,	Working visit.
Kazakhstan	Astana	November 3-4	State visit.
Turkey	Istanbul	November 17-19	1999 Istanbul summit
Ukraine	Kyiv	November 30	Inauguration of Leonid Kuchma.
Russia	Moscow	7-8 December	Met with President Boris Yeltsin and Prime Minister Vladimir Putin. Signed the Treaty on the Creation of a Union State of Russia and Belarus.

== 2000s ==
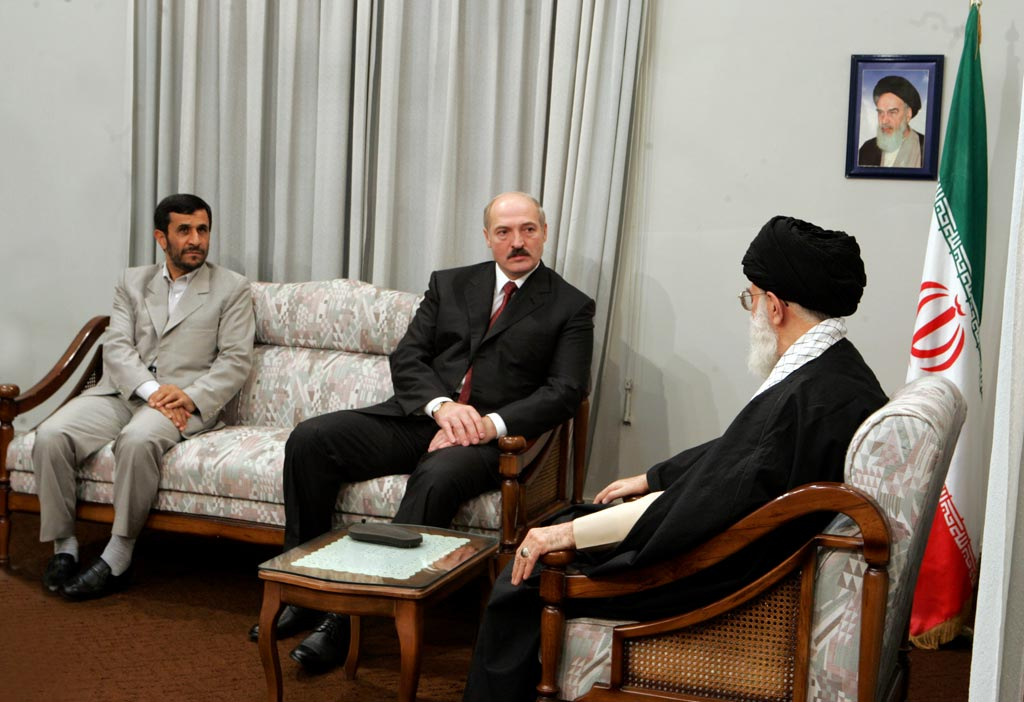
Meeting of Alexander Lukashenko with Iranian supreme leader Ali Khamenei and president Mahmoud Ahmadinejad in 2006

=== 2000 ===
Country	Areas visited	Dates	Details
Libya	Tripoli	30 October – 1 November	Official visit. Met with Brotherly Leader and Guide of the Revolution Muammar Gaddafi and Minister of Defense Abu-Bakr Yunis Jabr.

=== 2001 ===
Country	Areas visited	Dates	Details
China	Beijing	22–24 April	State visit. Met with General Secretary Jiang Zemin.

=== 2002 ===
Country	Areas visited	Dates	Details
Turkmenistan	Ashgabat	May	Official visit.
Ukraine	Chernihiv	29 May	Working visit.
Russia	Moscow	14 August	Working visit. Met with President Vladimir Putin to discuss Russia–Belarus integration.

=== 2003 ===
Country	Areas visited	Dates	Details
Russia	Saint Petersburg	30 May	Attended celebrations of the 300th anniversary of Saint Petersburg. Met with President Vladimir Putin.
Syria	Damascus	9-10 December	Official visit. Met with President Bashar al-Assad.

=== 2004 ===
Country	Areas visited	Dates	Details
Ukraine	Kyiv	27-28 October	Attended Liberation Day celebrations. Laid a wreath at the Tomb of the Unknown Soldier.

=== 2005 ===
Country	Areas visited	Dates	Details
Lebanon	Beirut	2-4 February	State visit. Met with President Émile Lahoud and Prime Minister Omar Karami.

=== 2006 ===
Country	Areas visited	Dates	Details
Cuba	Havana	15–17 September	Attended the 14th Summit of the Non-Aligned Movement.
Iran	Tehran	5–7 November	Official visit. Met with President Mahmoud Ahmadinejad and other Iranian officials.

=== 2007 ===
Country	Areas visited	Dates	Details
Russia	Moscow	24-25 April	Working visit. Attended the state funeral of Boris Yeltsin.
Venezuela	Caracas	6-9 December	State visit.

=== 2008 ===
Country	Areas visited	Dates	Details
China	Beijing	7–9 August	Attended the opening of the 2008 Summer Olympics. Met with General Secretary Hu Jintao.

=== 2009 ===
Country	Areas visited	Dates	Details
Ukraine	Chernihiv	20 January	Working visit.
Italy	Rome	27-28 April	Working visit. Met with Prime Minister Silvio Berlusconi.
Vatican City	Vatican City	27 April	Working visit. Met with Pope Benedict XVI.
Lithuania	Vilnius	16 September	Working visit. Met with President Dalia Grybauskaitė.
Ukraine	Kiev	5-6 November	Working visit. Met with President Viktor Yushchenko.

== 2010s ==
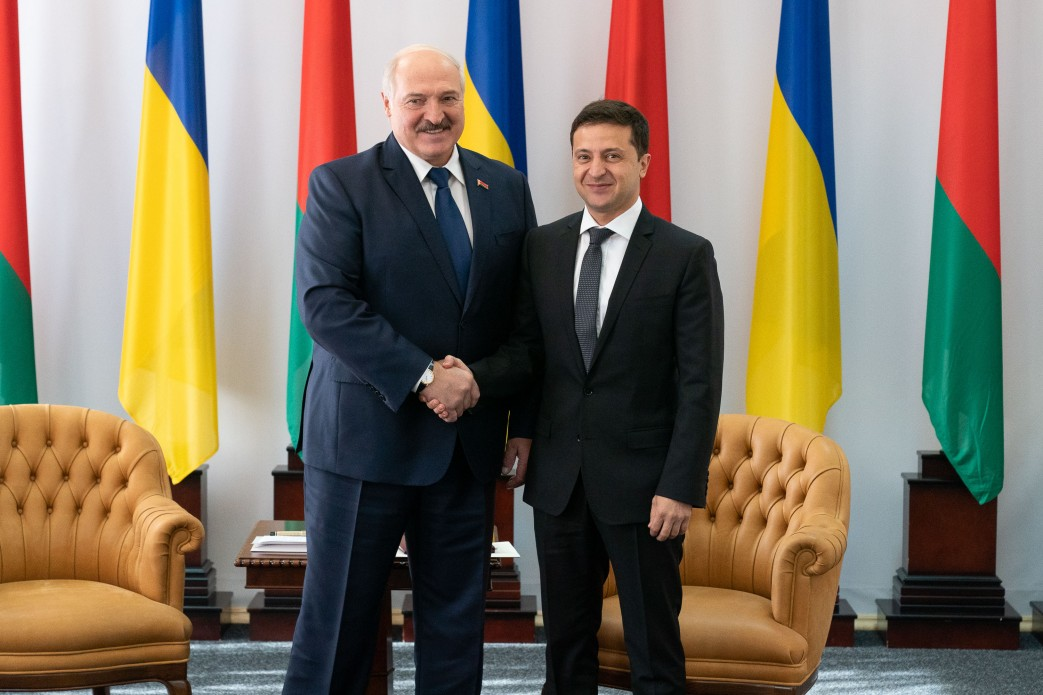
Alexander Lukashenko and Volodymyr Zelenskyy in Zhytomyr, Ukraine, 2019

=== 2010 ===
Country	Areas visited	Dates	Details
Turkey	Istanbul	2 October	Working visit. Met with President Abdullah Gül and Prime Minister Recep Tayyip Erdoğan.

=== 2011 ===
Country	Areas visited	Dates	Details
Turkmenistan	Ashgabat, Awaza	27–29 April	Official visit.
Kazakhstan	Astana	24–25 May	Official visit. Met with President Nursultan Nazarbayev.
Kazakhstan	Astana	12 August	Working visit. Attended the informal summit of CSTO heads of state.
Tajikistan	Dushanbe	27–29 October	Official visit. Met with President Emomali Rahmon.
Russia	Moscow	19–20 December	Attended the Eurasian Economic Community, CSTO and CIS summits.

=== 2012 ===
Country	Areas visited	Dates	Details
Venezuela	Caracas	27 June	Official visit. Met with President Hugo Chávez.

=== 2013 ===
Country	Areas visited	Dates	Details
Venezuela	Caracas	7-8 March	Attended the state funeral of Hugo Chávez.
Indonesia	Jakarta	18-20 March	State visit.
Ukraine	Kiev	18 July	Official visit. Met with President Viktor Yanukovych and Chairman of the Verkhovna Rada Volodymyr Rybak.

=== 2014 ===
Country	Areas visited	Dates	Details
Moldova	Chișinău	24-25 September	Official visit. Met with President Nicolae Timofti.
United Arab Emirates	Abu Dhabi	28-29 October	Working visit.
Russia	Moscow	23 December	Working visit. Attended the CIS summit and the SEEC meeting.

=== 2015 ===
Country	Areas visited	Dates	Details
Russia	Moscow	3 March	Working visit. Attended a meeting of the Supreme State Council of the Union State.
United States	New York City	26-29 September	Working visit. Visited the National September 11 Memorial & Museum. Attended the UN Summit on Sustainable Development. Addressed the general debate of the seventieth session of the United Nations General Assembly.

=== 2016 ===
Country	Areas visited	Dates	Details
Italy	Rome	20-21 May	Working visit. Met with President Sergio Mattarella.
Vatican City	Vatican City	21 May	Working visit. Met with Pope Francis.

=== 2017 ===
Country	Areas visited	Dates	Details
Egypt	Cairo	15-16 January	Working visit. Met with President Abdel Fattah el-Sisi.
Ukraine	Kiev	20-21 July	Official visit. Met with President Petro Poroshenko. Visited the National Museum of the Holodomor-Genocide.
India	New Delhi	11-12 September	State visit. Met with President Ram Nath Kovind and Prime Minister Narendra Modi.

=== 2018 ===
Country	Areas visited	Dates	Details
Moldova	Chișinău	April 18-19	
Tajikistan	Dushanbe	May 14-18	Official visit.
Uzbekistan	Tashkent	September 13–14	State visit.
Tajikistan	Dushanbe Hisar	September 28	Working visit.
Russia	St. Petersburg		Informal summit of the Council of Heads of State of the CIS.

=== 2019 ===
Country	Areas visited	Dates	Details
Ukraine	Zhytomyr	3-4 October 2019	Working visit. Met with President Volodymyr Zelenskyy. Attended the Second Forum of the Regions of Ukraine and the Republic of Belarus.
Austria	Vienna	12-13 November 2019	Official visit. Met with President Alexander Van der Bellen and Chancellor Sebastian Kurz.
Russia	Moscow	20 December 2019	Working visit. Attended the CIS summit.

== 2020s ==
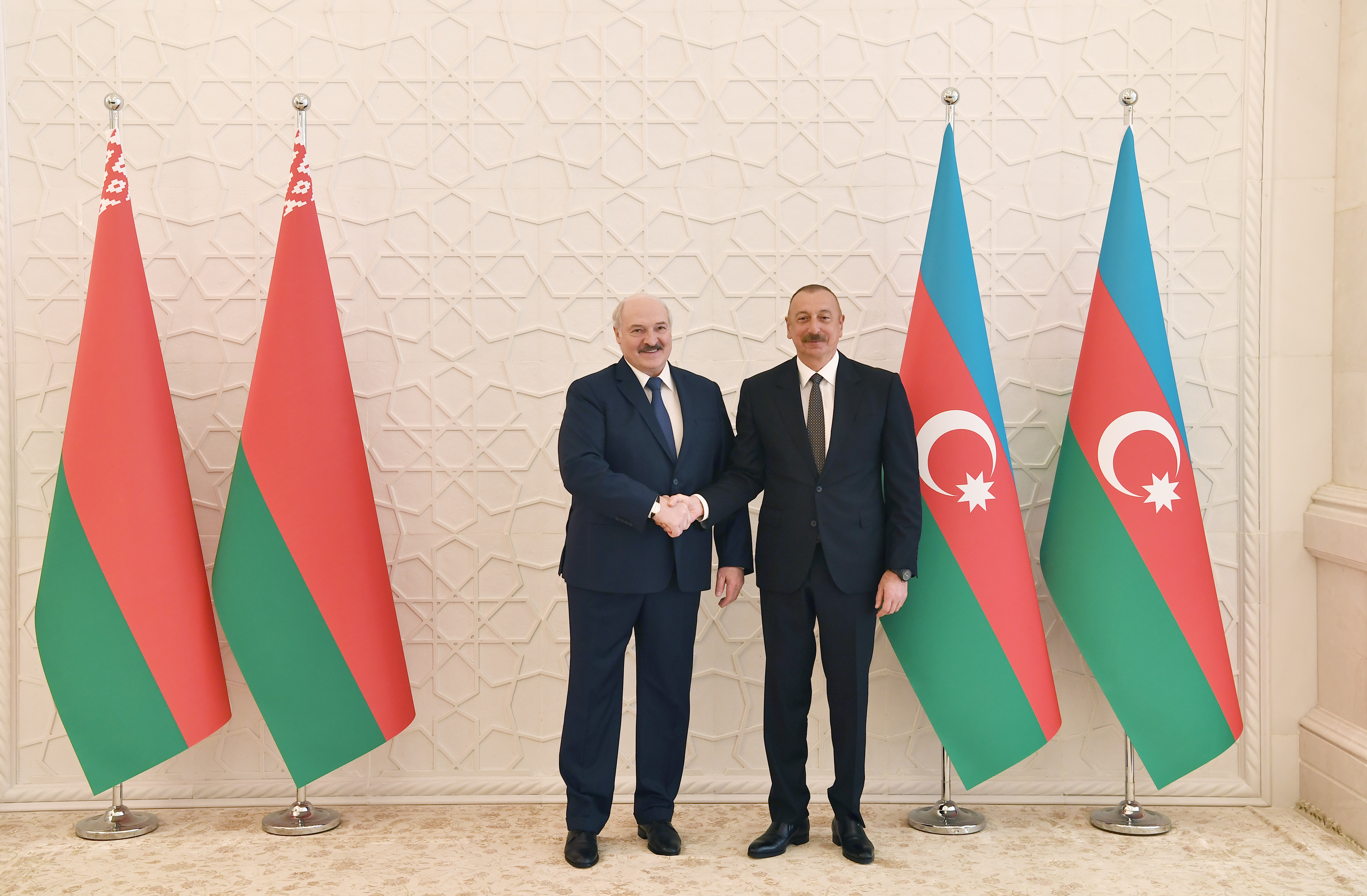
Alexander Lukashenko and Ilham Aliyev in Baku, Azerbaijan, 2021

=== 2020 ===
Country	Areas visited	Dates	Details
Egypt	Cairo	19-20 February	Working visit. Met with President Abdel Fattah el-Sisi.
Russia	Moscow	24 June	Attended the 2020 Moscow Victory Day Parade.
Russia	Sochi	14 September	Working level visit.

=== 2021 ===
Country	Areas visited	Dates	Details
Russia	Sochi	22 February	Working level visit.
Azerbaijan	Baku	13-14 April	Working visit.
Russia	Moscow	22 April	Working level visit.
Russia	Sochi	28 May	Working level visit.
Russia	Moscow	9 September	Working level visit.
Russia	Saint Petersburg	28-29 December	Attended the informal CIS summit..

=== 2022 ===
Country	Areas visited	Dates	Details
Russia	Moscow	11 March	Attended the 25th
Russia	Svobodny	12 April	Working level visit.
Russia	Moscow	16 May	Attended the CSTO summit.
Russia	Sochi	22 May	Working level visit.
Russia	Saint Petersburg	15-18 June	Attended the 25th St. Petersburg International Economic Forum.
Uzbekistan	Samarkand	15-16 September	Attended the SCO summit. This meeting was the occasion met with President Vladimir Putin, President Xi Jinping, President of Uzbekistan Shavkat Mirziyoyev, Prime Minister Shehbaz Sharif.
Russia	Sochi	26 September	Working level visit.
Russia	Saint Petersburg	7 October	Attended the informal CIS summit(Concurrently serving as President Putin's birthday celebration).
Tajikistan	Dushanbe	11-12 October	Official visit.
Kazakhstan	Astana	12-14 October	Attended the CIS summit.
Armenia	Yerevan	23 November	Attended the CSTO summit.
Russia	Saint Petersburg	26-27 December	Attended the informal CIS summit.

=== 2023 ===
Country	Areas visited	Dates	Details
Zimbabwe	Harare	30 January – 1 February	Official visit. Met with President Emmerson Mnangagwa.
China	Beijing	February 28 – 2 March	Official visit. Met with General Secretary Xi Jinping.
Iran	Tehran	13-14 March	Working visit. Met with President Ebrahim Raisi.
Russia	Moscow	9 May	Attended the 2023 Moscow Victory Day Parade.
Kyrgyzstan	Bishkek	October 13,	Working visit
United Arab Emirates	Dubai	December 1	2023 United Nations Climate Change Conference.
China	Beijing	December 3-4	Working visit.
United Arab Emirates	Abu Dhabi	December 6	Working visit.
Equatorial Guinea	Malabo Ciudad de la Paz	December 9	State visit.
Kenya	Nairobi	December 10	Working visit.

=== 2024 ===
Country	Areas visited	Dates	Details
Russia	St. Petersburg	January 27-29	80th anniversary of the end of the Blockade of Leningrad. Union State meeting.
Uzbekistan	Tashkent	7-8 February	Working visit. Met with President Shavkat Mirziyoyev.
Russia	Kazan	21 February	Attended the Games of the Future 2024.
Russia	Moscow	9 May	Attended the 2024 Moscow Victory Day Parade.
Azerbaijan	Baku; Fuzuli; Shusha	May 16-17	State visit.
Mongolia	Ulaanbaatar	1-4 June	State visit.
Russia	Irkutsk	5 June	Working visit.
Russia	Kazan	22-24 October	Attended the 16th BRICS Summit.
Azerbaijan	Baku	12-22 November	Attended the 2024 United Nations Climate Change Conference.
Pakistan	Islamabad	25-27 November	Official visit. Met with Prime Minister Shahbaz Sharif.
Kazakhstan	Astana	27-28 November	Working visit. Attended the CSTO summit.
Oman	Muscat	14-18 December	Working visit. Met with Sultan Haitham bin Tariq.
United Arab Emirates	Abu Dhabi	18-22 December	Working visit. Met with Minister of State for Foreign Trade Thani bin Ahmed Al Zeyoudi and President Mohamed bin Zayed Al Nahyan.

=== 2025 ===
Country	Areas visited	Dates	Details
Russia	Volgograd	29 April	Working visit. Met with President Vladimir Putin.
Russia	Moscow	8-9 May	Attended the 2025 Moscow Victory Day Parade.
China	Beijing	2-4 June	Official visit. Met with General Secretary Xi Jinping.
Russia	Valaam	1 August	Working visit. Met with President Vladimir Putin. Visited the Valaam Monastery.
China	Tianjin and Beijing	31 August - 3 September	Attended the 2025 Tianjin SCO summit and the 2025 China Victory Day Parade.
Myanmar	Naypyidaw	29 November	State visit.
Algeria	Algiers	2-3 December	Met with President Abdelmadjid Tebboune

=== 2026 ===
Country	Areas visited	Dates	Details
North Korea	Pyongyang	25-26 March	Official visit. Met with Supreme Leader Kim Jong Un. Signed a friendship and cooperation treaty.
Russia	Moscow	8-9 May	Attended the 2026 Moscow Victory Day Parade.
Kazakhstan	Astana	28-29 May	Working visit. Attended the EEU summit.
China	Beijing	28-30 June	Working visit.
Indonesia	Jakarta	1-2 July	State visit
Myanmar	Naypyidaw	2 July	Working visit.
Kyrgyzstan	Bishkek	31 August – 1 September	Attended the SCO summit and the opening ceremony of the 6th World Nomad Games.
Turkmenistan	Awaza National Tourist Zone	8-9 October	Attended the CIS summit.
Russia	Moscow	10-11 November	Attended the CSTO summit.

== Future visits ==
Country	Areas visited	Date(s)	Notes
Russia	Saint Petersburg	21 December	Lukashenko is plan to attend the EAEU summit and informal CIS summit.
