= Treaty of Minsk =

The Treaty of Minsk may refer to:

- Belovezha Accords, in 1991
- Minsk agreements, in 2014 and 2015
