= Post-Soviet transition in Ukraine =

Transitional government (1991–1996)

Coordinates: 50°27′N 30°30′E

- 1 December 1991 – 28 June 1996
- Location: Ukraine
- President(s): Leonid Kravchuk (1991–1994); Leonid Kuchma (1994–1996)
- Prime Minister(s): Vitold Fokin (1991–1992); Leonid Kuchma (1992–1993); Vitaliy Masol (1994–1995); Yevhen Marchuk (1995–1996); Pavlo Lazarenko (1996)
- Key events: Ukrainian independence referendum (1 December 1991); Belavezha Accords ratified (10 December 1991); Internationally recognized (26 December 1991); Authority handed over by the Ukrainian govt.-in-exile (22 August 1992); Constitution of Ukraine (28 June 1996)

The post-Soviet transition in Ukraine was the period following the country's independence in 1991 up until the adoption of its constitution in 1996.

== Geography ==
Ukraine's territory (including the Crimean Peninsula) was the same as that of the Ukrainian SSR with a land area of about 603,700 square kilometres (233,100 sq mi).

== History ==
=== Background ===
The Ukrainian Soviet Socialist Republic was one of the founding states of the Soviet Union (USSR). Prior to its creation, the Ukrainian People's Republic was proclaimed in 1917 and declared its independence from Russia on 25 January 1918 before being consumed by Soviet Russia in 1921.

In 1985, Mikhail Gorbachev became head of state of the USSR and introduced several policies, such as the perestroika and glasnost. Instead of saving the Soviet regime, the reforms triggered a number of popular upheavals in Europe, such as the fall of the Berlin Wall in 1989.

Between 1990 and 1991, several republics of the Soviet Union declared their state sovereignty and later proclaimed independence. On 16 July 1990, the Supreme Soviet of the Ukrainian SSR adopted its Declaration of State Sovereignty of Ukraine.

=== Independence ===
The country declared its independence on 24 August 1991, a decision later confirmed by the referendum held on 1 December 1991, in which 90.3% of voters voted in favor of independence.

The same day, Leonid Kravchuk, head of the Supreme Council of Ukraine, was elected as the country's first president. Shortly after, an economic then political crisis developed and Kravchuk organized another presidential election as a response.

In 1992, Mykola Plaviuk, the exiled Ukrainian president, handed over powers to Kravchuk, thus declaring the Ukrainian government a legal successor to the Ukrainian People's Republic.

=== End of the transitional period ===
In 1994, Leonid Kuchma was elected by 52% of the voters. He implemented economic reforms paving the way for aid from the International Monetary Fund. However, Kuchma failed to obtain a majority in the 1994 Ukrainian parliamentary election and had to share power with the opposition. The 13th legislation was issued by parliament on 28 June 1996, where a constitution was adopted and took effect immediately afterwards. The country's official name became "Ukraine".
