= Viskuli =

Hunting estate in Białowieża Forest, Belarus

Coordinates: 52°37′N 23°57′E

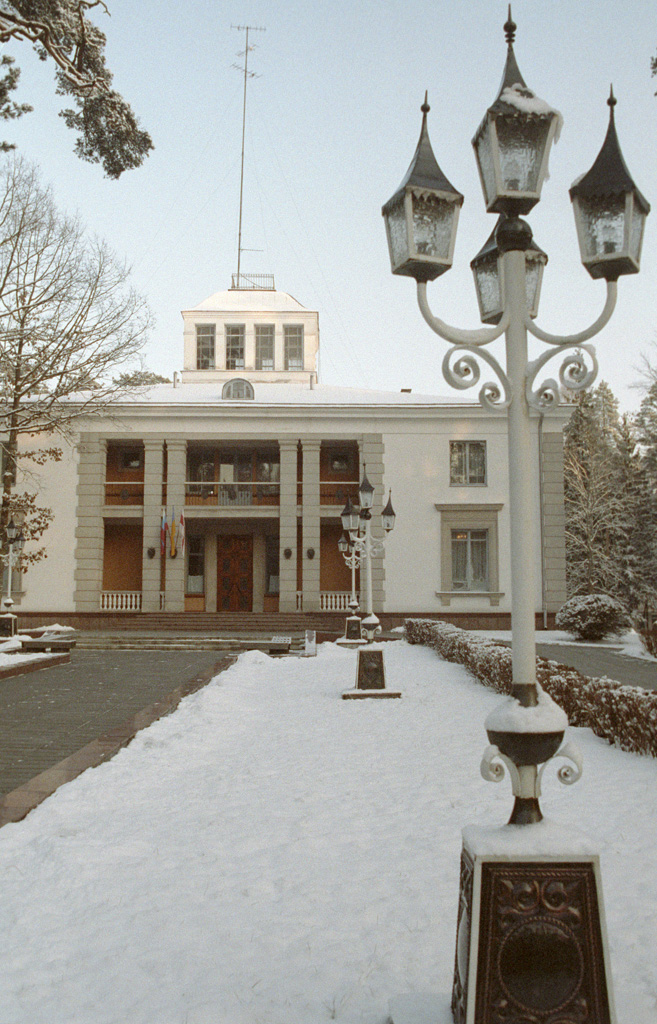
State dacha in 1991

Viskuli (Russian: Вискули́, Belarusian: Віскулі, Polish: Wiskule) is a hunting estate in Białowieża Forest, in Pruzhany District, Brest Region, Belarus, named after the former khutor Viskuli nearby, about 8 km from the Poland-Belarus border, 2 km south of Belarus Route P81.

== History ==
The residential complex was constructed in the 1950s as a state dacha for officials of the USSR and Byelorussian SSR.

In 1991, Viskuli became known worldwide as the place where the Belavezha Accords were signed by Russian president Boris Yeltsin, Ukrainian president Leonid Kravchuk and Belarusian chairman Stanislav Shushkevich, which declared the dissolution of the Soviet Union.

On September 12, 2008, Viskuli was the place of the meeting of the foreign ministers of Belarus (Sergei Martynov) and Poland (Radosław Sikorski), after several years of cold relations.
