= Belovezha Accords =

1991 agreement that established the Commonwealth of Independent States

Agreement establishing the Commonwealth of Independent States
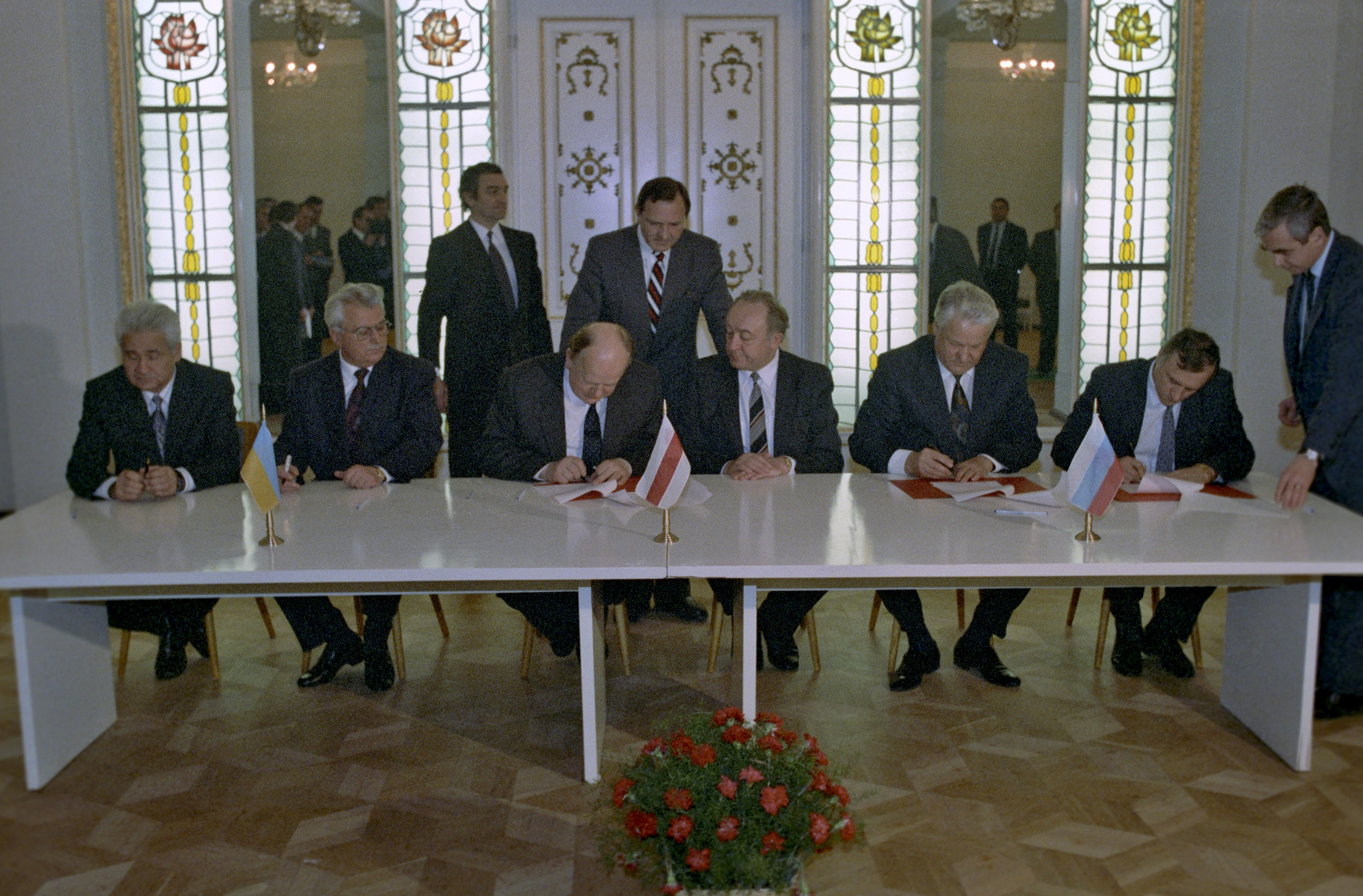
- The signing ceremony at Viskuli Government House
- Type: Treaty establishing a loose regional organisation
- Signed: 8 December 1991
- Location: Viskuli, Belovezh Forest, Belarus (de facto); Minsk, Minsk Oblast, Belarus (de jure)
- Effective: (Belarus) (Ukraine) 10 December 1991; (Russia) 12 December 1991; (Kazakhstan) 23 December 1991; (Tajikistan) 25 December 1991; (Armenia) (Turkmenistan) 26 December 1991; (Uzbekistan) 4 January 1992; (Kyrgyzstan) 6 March 1992; (Azerbaijan) 24 September 1993; (Georgia (country)) 3 December 1993 (Note: Georgia denounced the accords.); (Moldova) 8 April 1994 (Note: Moldova has denounced the accords, which will be effective on 8 April 2027.)
- Signatories: (Belarus) Chairman Stanislav Shushkevich; (Belarus) Prime Minister Vyacheslav Kebich; (Russia) President Boris Yeltsin; (Russia) First Deputy Prime Minister Gennady Burbulis; (Ukraine) President Leonid Kravchuk; (Ukraine) Prime Minister Vitold Fokin
- Parties: Belarus; Russian Federation (RSFSR); Ukraine
- Depositary: Belarus
- Languages: Belarusian, Russian, Ukrainian

The Agreement on the creation of the Commonwealth of Independent States (officially), or unofficially the Minsk Agreement and best known as the Belovezha Accords, (Note: Russian: Беловежские соглашения, romanized: Belovezhskiye soglasheniya; Belarusian: Белавежскае пагадненне, romanized: Bielaviežskaje pahadniennie; Ukrainian: Біловезькі угоди, romanized: Bilovezʹki uhody.) is the agreement declaring that the Soviet Union (USSR) had effectively ceased to exist and establishing the Commonwealth of Independent States (CIS) in its place as an organization created by the same Union Republics. The documentation was signed at the state dacha near Viskuli in Belovezhskaya Pushcha, Belarus on 8 December 1991, by leaders of three of the four republics (except for the defunct Transcaucasian SFSR) which had signed the 1922 Treaty on the Creation of the USSR:

- Belarusian Parliament chairman Stanislav Shushkevich and Prime Minister of Belarus Vyacheslav Kebich
- Russian president Boris Yeltsin and First Deputy Prime Minister of the RSFSR/Russian Federation Gennady Burbulis
- Ukrainian president Leonid Kravchuk and Ukrainian prime minister Vitold Fokin

As Shushkevich said in 2006, by December "the union had already been broken up by the putschists" who in August 1991 tried to remove Mikhail Gorbachev from power to prevent the transformation of the Soviet Union into what Shushkevich described as "a confederation". The three wanted to avoid what happened in the breakup of Yugoslavia and "there was no other way out of the situation than a divorce."

The Protocol to the Agreement on the Creation of the Commonwealth of Independent States dated 21 December 1991 was signed on 21 December 1991.

On 31 March 1994, the CIS Economic Court decided that the 1991 agreements are primary in relation to the CIS Charter, and the CIS charter itself does not change the conditions of those 11 countries that have become co-founders of the CIS after they ratified the 1991 agreements. It is the agreements of 1991 that are the constituent and founding documents of the Commonwealth, but the Charter is not.

== Name ==
The name is variously translated as Belavezh Accords, Belovezh Accords, Belovezha Accords, Belavezha Agreement, the Belovezhskaya Accord, the Belaya Vezha Accord, etc. A reason of the discrepancy is the difference between Russian and Belarusian names of the eponymous forest on the Belarus–Poland border that used to have General Secretary Brezhnev's hunting lodge.

== Background ==
In the 1980s, Mikhail Gorbachev's policies of Glasnost (openness) and Perestroika (restructuring) aimed to revitalize the Soviet system but instead accelerated its unraveling. Nationalist, democratic and liberal movements gained momentum across the Soviet republics, and the control of the Communist Party weakened.

In the Soviet Union, a Union Republic was a constituent federated political entity with a system of government called a Soviet republic, which was officially defined in the 1977 constitution as "a sovereign Soviet socialist state which has united with the other Soviet republics to form the Union of Soviet Socialist Republics" and whose sovereignty is limited by membership in the Union. As a result of its status as a sovereign state, the Union Republic de jure had the right to enter into relations with foreign states, conclude treaties with them and exchange diplomatic and consular representatives and participate in the activities of international organizations (including membership in international organizations). In the process of perestroika, it was once again confirmed that de jure all Union republics have, constitutionally and in practice, the right to freely withdraw from the Soviet Union and even without the consent of the central government, but this process must be orderly. In particular, the consent of the Soviet Union as a permanent member of the UN Security Council was required to become a new member of the UN. Self-determination is a cardinal principle in modern international law but no right to secession is recognized under international law.

=== Transition period ===
In order to reform the Soviet Union, the New Union Treaty and the draft European-Asian Union, among others, were proposed.

On 5 September 1991 the Law of the USSR "On the bodies of state power and administration of the Union of Soviet Socialist Republics in the transition period" was signed.

On 24 September, RSFSR State Secretary Gennady Burbulis arrived to Boris Yeltsin, who was on vacation at the Black Sea coast. He brought a document "Russia's Strategy for the Transition Period", which later received the unofficial name "Burbulis Memorandum". The "memorandum" contained an analysis of the situation in the country, proposals on what should be done without delay, prepared by Yegor Gaidar's group. The document concluded that Russia should take the course of economic independence with a "soft", "temporary" political alliance with other republics, i.e. to create not a declared, but a truly independent state of Russia. 30 years later, Burbulis recalled that the Burbulis Memorandum was the reform concept of Gaidar's group: There was not any secrecy. First Yegor Gaidar made a report at the State Council of the RSFSR, and then Burbulis spoke at the State Council and said he would make a report for Yeltsin.

As the Kommersant newspaper wrote on 7 October 1991, a series of conflicts occurred in the RSFSR government during preparations for the signing of the Treaty on the Economic Community. In his speech to members of the Russian parliament, RSFSR State Secretary Gennady Burbulis declared Russia's special role as the legal successor to the Soviet Union. Accordingly, the ways of drafting agreements with the republics should be determined by the Russian leadership. Instead of the planned order, he suggested signing a political agreement first, followed by an economic one. The newspaper suggested that Burbulis' goal was to persuade Yeltsin not to sign the agreement as it stands at the time. Yegor Gaidar, Alexander Shokhin and Konstantin Kagalovsky were named as the developers of the statement made by Burbulis. In the same time, a group of "isolationist patriots" consisting of Mikhail Maley, Nikolai Fedorov, Alexander Shokhin, Igor Lazarev and Mikhail Poltoranin criticized Ivan Silaev and Yevgeny Saburov for wanting to preserve the Soviet Union.

This economic agreement was then to be supplemented by a similar political agreement. On 14 November in Novo-Ogaryovo, Mikhail Gorbachev and the heads of the seven union republics pre-agreed to sign a treaty on the creation of a political union called the Union of Sovereign States, which would have no constitution but would remain a subject of international law as the Soviet Union had been. The Treaty would complement the previous economic treaty and was scheduled to be signed in December.

On 30 November, Boris Yeltsin told George H. W. Bush "Right now the draft union treaty has only seven states ready to sign up - five Islamic and two Slavic (Belarus and Russia). That concerns me a great deal. ... We cannot have a situation where Russia and Belarus have two votes as Slavic states against five for the Islamic nations. ...I told Gorbachev that I can't imagine a union without Ukraine. ... We cannot lose ties between Russia and Ukraine. I am now thinking very hard with a very narrow circle of key advisors on how to preserve the Union, but also how not to lose relations with Ukraine. Our relations with Ukraine are more significant than those with Asian republics, which we feed all the time." The referendum in Ukraine was scheduled for 1 December.

== Legal basis ==
Although the USSR Supreme Soviet passed on 3 April 1990 a law specifying the process for a union republic to leave the union, this law was not used to legally dissolve the USSR. Instead, the 1922 Treaty on the Creation of the Union of Soviet Socialist Republics combined with the 1969 Vienna Convention on the Law of Treaties were used to formally dissolve the Soviet Union. This route provided an option for the original signatories of Treaty on the Creation of the Union of Soviet Socialist Republics to bypass the involvement of the other Soviet Republics. Only three out of four original signatories of the Treaty on the Creation of the Union of Soviet Socialist Republics were present, because the fourth (Transcaucasian Socialist Federative Soviet Republic) was dissolved in 1936.

According to the CIS Executive Committee website, "within the CIS, the conclusion of international treaties, their entry into force, application, interpretation, amendment, withdrawal from treaties, termination and suspension as well as the procedure for formulating reservations, are carried out in accordance with the Vienna Convention." As of 8 December 1991, the Vienna Convention on the Law of Treaties entered into force for Belarus on 1 May 1986 and for Ukraine on 14 May 1986.

== Key points ==
Photocopy of Accords

According to the information from the depository of the international agreement published on the Unified Register of Legal Acts and Other Documents of the Commonwealth of Independent States (under the executive committee of the Commonwealth of Independent States), the Agreement was signed during the first meeting of the Council of Heads of State of the CIS, which was officially held in Minsk.

The text of the Belovezh Accords contains an introduction and 14 Articles. The original text is available in official translation on the Council of Europe website.

The main obligations of the parties to the Agreement, ratified by all former Soviet republics except Estonia, Latvia and Lithuania, includes the following:

1. The end of the existence of the USSR, with the "setting up of lawfully constituted democratic… independent states… on the basis of mutual recognition of and respect for State sovereignty".
2. Establishing on the territory the "right to self-determination" along with "norms relating to human and people's rights".
3. "Parties guarantee to their citizens, regardless of their nationality or other differences, equal rights and freedoms. Each of the Parties guarantees to the citizens of the other Parties, and also to stateless persons resident in their territory, regardless of national affiliation or other differences, civil, political, social, economic and cultural rights and freedoms in accordance with the universal recognized international norms relating to human rights" (Article 2).
4. "The Parties, desirous of facilitating the expression, preservation and development of the distinctive ethnic, cultural, linguistic and religious characteristics of the national minorities resident in their territories and of the unique ethno-cultural regions that have come into being, will extend protection to them" (Article 3).
5. "Equitable cooperation" (Article 4).
6. "Territorial integrity" along with "freedom of movement of citizens" (Article 5).

According to the text of Article 6, Russia, Ukraine and Belarus form a "common military and strategic space" and "united armed forces."

Immediately after the signing of the Agreement on 8 December 1991, Russian president Yeltsin called U.S. president George H. W. Bush and specifically read him Article 6 of the Agreement. "First of all, I talked with USSR Minister of Defense Shaposhnikov. I want to read the 6th Article of the Agreement. As a matter of fact Shaposhnikov fully agreed and supported our position. I am now reading Article 6." ... "Please note well the next paragraph, Mr. President (and I urge the interpreter to translate this precisely)." ... "Dear George, I am finished. This is extremely, extremely important. Because of the tradition between us, I couldn't even wait ten minutes to call you."

=== Statement by the Heads of State ===
Simultaneously with the Belovezha Agreement, a statement by the heads of state was adopted at a meeting of the Council of Heads of State of the CIS. In the statement, the parties in particular declared that:

- negotiations on the preparation of a new Union Treaty had reached an impasse, and the objective process of the republics' withdrawal from the USSR and the formation of independent states had become a reality,
- the short-sighted policy of the center has led to a deep economic and political crisis, the collapse of production, and a catastrophic decline in the standard of living of virtually all segments of society,
- aware of our responsibility to our peoples and the world community, and of the urgent need for practical implementation of political and economic reforms, we hereby declare the formation of the Commonwealth of Independent States, on which the parties signed an agreement on 8 December 1991.
- The member states of the Commonwealth intend to pursue a course of strengthening international peace and security.
- They guarantee the fulfillment of international obligations arising from treaties and agreements of the former Soviet Union and ensure single control over nuclear weapons and their non-proliferation.

=== Statement by the Governments on coordinating economic policy ===
At the same time, Kebich, Burbulis and Fokin signed a Statement by the governments of Belarus, Russia and Ukraine on coordinating economic policy. According to the statement, "Maintaining and developing the close economic ties that have been established between our countries is vital for stabilizing the national economy and creating the conditions for economic recovery." The parties agreed, in particular,

- carry out coordinated radical economic reforms aimed at creating full-fledged market mechanisms
- refrain from any actions that cause economic damage to each other
- conclude an interbank agreement aimed at limiting money supply, ensuring effective control of the money supply, and forming a system of mutual settlements
- pursue a coordinated policy of reducing republican budget deficits
- pursue a coordinated policy of price liberalization and social protection of citizens
- undertake joint efforts aimed at ensuring the unity of the economic space
- coordinate foreign economic activity and customs policy and ensure freedom of transit
- develop a mechanism for the implementation of inter-republican economic agreements during December

As noted in the World Trade Organization report, Eurasian integration has been taking shape since 1991, originally via the establishment of the Commonwealth of Independent States in 1991.

== Legal basis and ratification ==
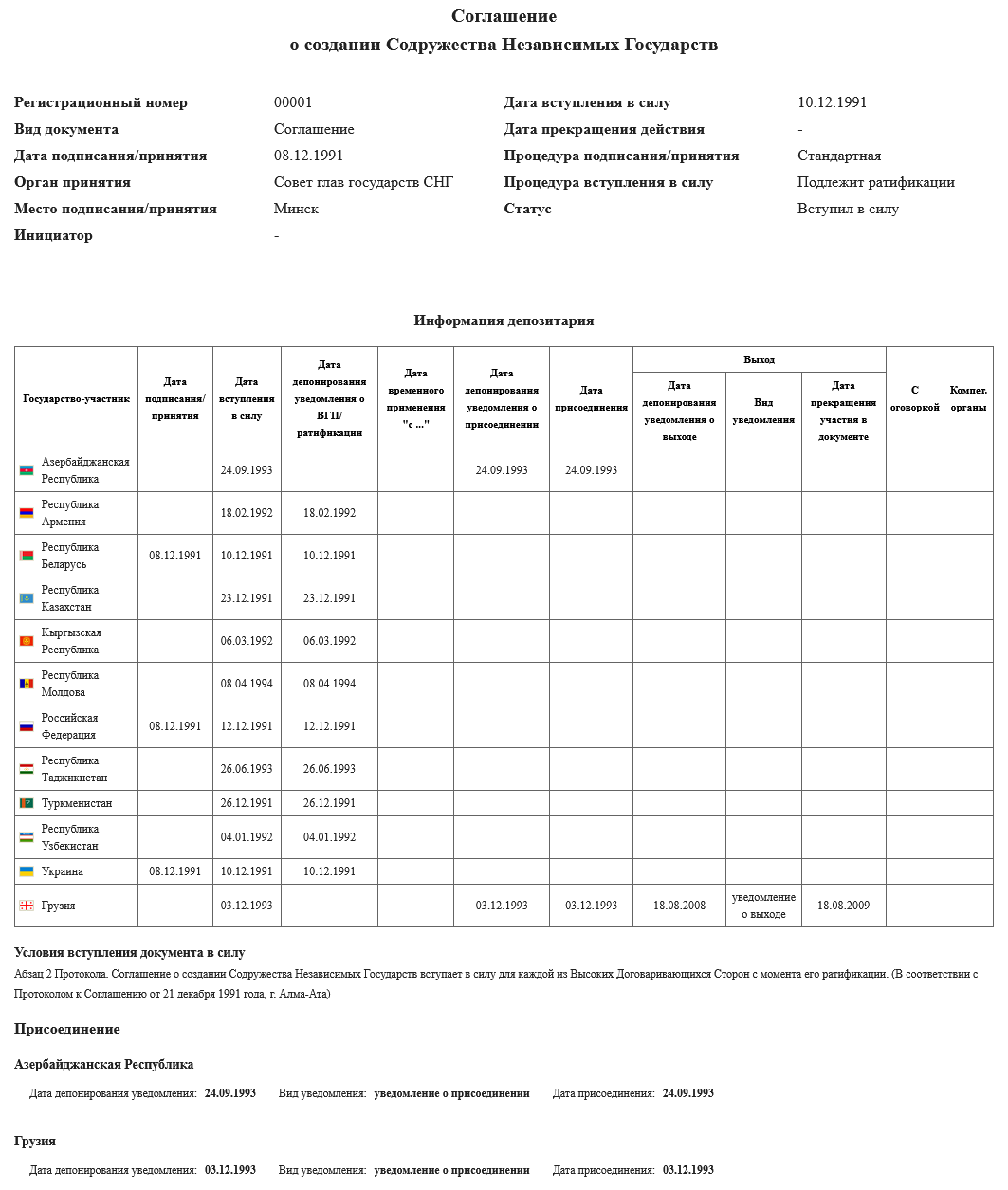
The Agreement on the Creation of the Commonwealth of Independent States dated 8 December 1991. The information from the depository of the international agreement published on the Unified Register of Legal Acts and Other Documents of the Commonwealth of Independent States (under the executive committee of the Commonwealth of Independent States) as of 2024.

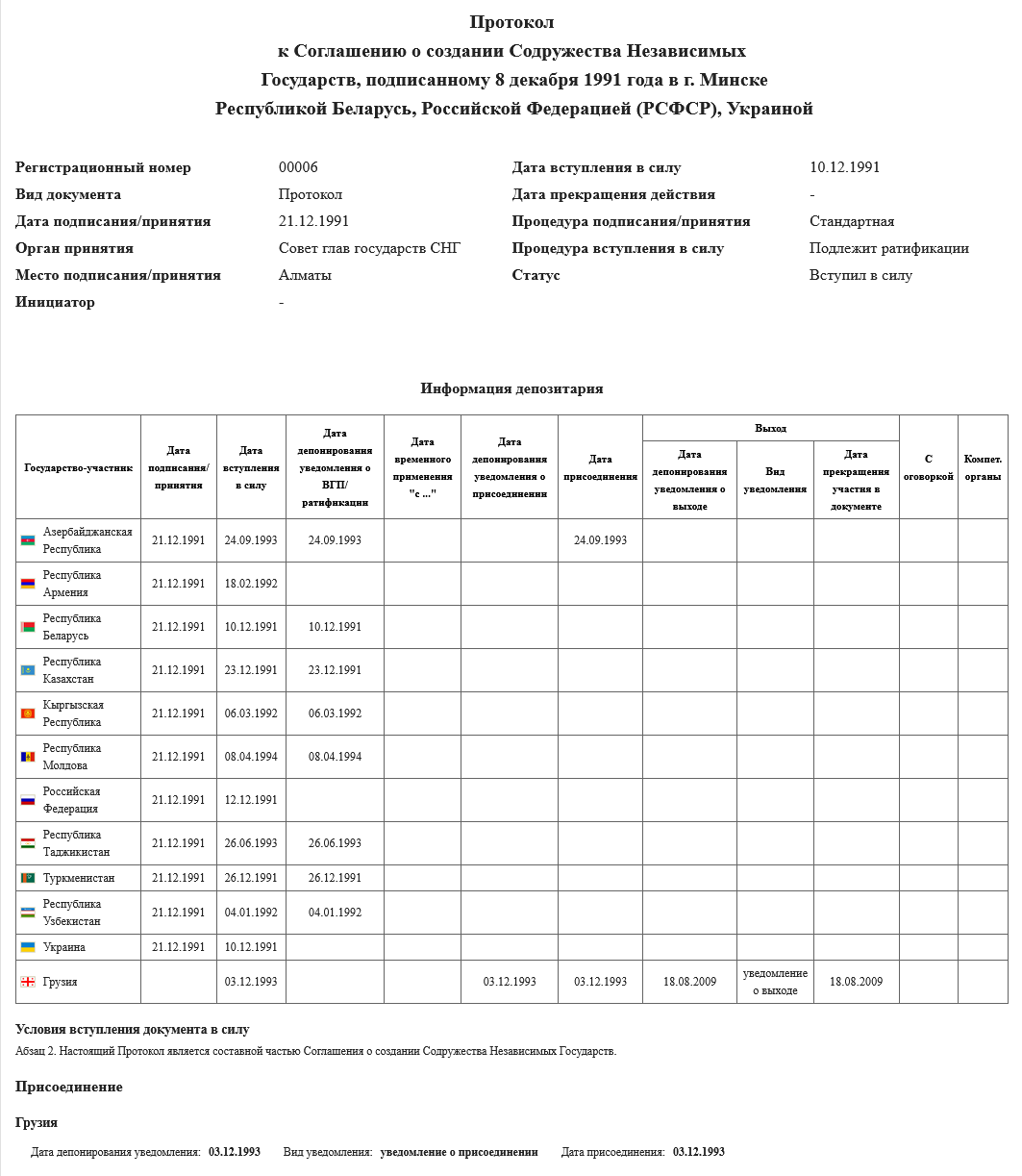
The Protocol to the Agreement on the Creation of the Commonwealth of Independent States dated 21 December 1991. The information from the depository of the international agreement published on the Unified Register of Legal Acts and Other Documents of the Commonwealth of Independent States (under the executive committee of the Commonwealth of Independent States) as of 2024.

The preamble of the document stated that "the USSR, as a subject of international law and a geopolitical reality, is ceasing its existence". It also invited other republics to join the three founding members. While there was some dispute over the authority of the leaders of three of the 12 republics to dissolve the entire Union, individual union republics had the right to secede freely from the Union according to Article 72 of the 1977 Soviet Constitution; since 1990, the procedure for the withdrawal of republics from the Union was regulated by a special law.

On 10 December, the agreement was ratified by the Verkhovna Rada of Ukraine and the Supreme Council of Belarus. On 12 December, the Supreme Soviet of the Russian SFSR formally ratified the Belovezh Accords, denounced (that is, withdrew from) (Note: In international law, the term denounce or denunciation means "a unilateral act by which a party seeks to terminate its participation in a treaty.") the 1922 Treaty on the Creation of the Soviet Union, and recalled the Russian deputies from the Supreme Soviet of the USSR. Some members of the Russian parliament disputed the legality of this ratification, since according to the Constitution of the RSFSR of 1978, consideration of this document was in the exclusive jurisdiction of the Congress of People's Deputies of the RSFSR.

What remained of the Soviet federal government also argued that the purported dissolution was illegal and ineffective. Gorbachev described the moves thus:

The fate of the multinational state cannot be determined by the will of the leaders of three republics. The question should be decided only by constitutional means with the participation of all sovereign states and taking into account the will of all their citizens. The statement that Unionwide legal norms would cease to be in effect is also illegal and dangerous; it can only worsen the chaos and anarchy in society. The hastiness with which the document appeared is also of serious concern. It was not discussed by the populations nor by the Supreme Soviets of the republics in whose name it was signed. Even worse, it appeared at the moment when the draft treaty for a Union of Sovereign States, drafted by the USSR State Council, was being discussed by the parliaments of the republics.

The question as to whether the Belovezh Accords were enough in and of themselves to dissolve the Soviet Union with the agreement of only three republics (albeit three of the largest and most powerful republics) was resolved on 21 December 1991, when the representatives of 11 of the 12 remaining Soviet republics (Note: Twelve republics remained in the USSR at the time, including the three parties to the Belovezh Accords. The three Baltic republics had separately seceded in August 1991.)—all except Georgia—signed the Alma-Ata Protocol, which reiterated both the end of the Soviet Union and the establishment of the CIS. Given that 11 of the republics now agreed that the Soviet Union no longer existed, the plurality of member-republics required for its effective continuance as a federal state was no longer in place. The Alma-Ata signatories also provisionally accepted Gorbachev's resignation as president of the Soviet Union and agreed on several other practical measures consequential to the extinction of the Union. Gorbachev stated that he would resign as soon as he knew the CIS was a reality. Three days later, in a secret meeting with Yeltsin, he accepted the fait accompli of the Soviet Union's dissolution.

At a press conference in Almaty on 21 December 1991, Leonid Kravchuk answered the journalist's question "Question to all (heads of state). Why did you refuse the name Commonwealth of Euro-Asian and Independent States?" as follows: "The fact is that the beginning of the Commonwealth and the foundation of the Commonwealth was laid in Minsk and the corresponding name was given to the Commonwealth there. After that three states - Belarus, Russia, Ukraine - have already ratified these documents. Therefore, it would be unreasonable to change the name both legally and politically." Answering the journalist's question about the "amendments made by the Ukrainian Parliament" to the Belovezha Agreement, Leonid Kravchuk replied: “According to the Vienna Convention, any document signed by a head of state is binding on that state, as well as the amendments made by the parliaments of a state during ratification of this document are binding, so in this case both documents are in force: the Belarusian document signed by me and others, and the amendments made by the parliaments. According to the information from the depository of the international agreement published on the Unified Register of Legal Acts and Other Documents of the Commonwealth of Independent States (under the executive committee of the Commonwealth of Independent States) as of 2025, Ukraine has not made any reservations or sent any notifications other than the ratification of the Agreement on 10 December 1991 in its entirely and without reservations, and the Agreement itself remains in force for Ukraine without reservations as of 2025.

Although Gorbachev had long since lost the ability to influence events outside Moscow, a rump Soviet federal government continued to exist for four more days, and Gorbachev continued to hold control over the Kremlin. This ended in the early hours of 25 December 1991 when Gorbachev resigned and turned control of the Kremlin and the remaining powers of his office over to the office of the president of Russia, Yeltsin. Soon afterward, the flag of the Soviet Union was lowered from the Kremlin Senate for the final time, and the flag of Russia was hoisted in its place.

Later that day, President of the United States George H. W. Bush gave a short speech on national television in the United States to mark the end of the Cold War and to recognize the independence of the former states of the Soviet Union.

Also on 25 December 1991, the Russian SFSR, now no longer a sub-national entity of the Soviet Union but a sovereign nation in its own right, adopted a law renaming itself the "Russian Federation" or "Russia" (both being equally official with the ratification of the Russian constitution in 1993).

Gorbachev's speech, as well as the replacement of the Soviet flag with the Russian flag, were all seen around the world, and marked the de facto end of the Soviet Union. However, the final legal step in the dissolution came a day later, when the Soviet of Republics, the upper house of the Supreme Soviet of the USSR, recognized the collapse of the Union and voted both itself and the Union out of existence. The lower house, the Soviet of the Union, had not met since 12 December when Russia recalled its deputies from both chambers, leaving it without a quorum.

The Summit of Alma-Ata also issued a statement on 21 December 1991, supporting Russia's claim to be recognized as the successor state of the Soviet Union for the purposes of membership of the United Nations. On 25 December 1991, Russian president Yeltsin informed UN Secretary-General Javier Pérez de Cuéllar that the Soviet Union had been dissolved and that Russia would, as its successor state, continue the Soviet Union's membership in the United Nations. The document confirmed the credentials of the representatives of the Soviet Union as representatives of Russia and requested that the name "Soviet Union" be changed to "Russian Federation" in all records and entries. This was a move designed to allow Russia to retain the Soviet Union's permanent Security Council seat, which would not have been possible if the former republics were all reckoned as equal successors of the Soviet Union, or if the Soviet Union was regarded as having no successor state for the purpose of continuing the same UN membership (see Russia and the United Nations). The Secretary-General circulated the request, and there being no objection from any Member State, the Russian Federation took the Soviet Union's UN seat. On 31 January 1992, Russian Federation President Yeltsin personally took part in a Security Council meeting as representative of Russia, the first Security Council meeting in which Russia occupied the permanent Security Council seat originally granted to the Soviet Union by the UN Charter.

== Aftermath ==
=== 1993 Russian constitutional crisis ===
According to some Russian politicians, one of the reasons for the political crisis of 1993 was the repeated refusal of the Congress of People's Deputies of Russia to ratify the Belovezhskaya Agreement and to exclude the mention of the Constitution and laws of the USSR from the text of the Constitution of the RSFSR.

=== Original document missing ===
Stanislav Shushkevich, the former leader of Belarus, was told by the country's foreign ministry that the original accords have gone missing as of 7 February 2013. He tried to obtain the original copy to assist in writing his memoirs.

=== Georgia ===
Georgia denounced the Belovezha Accords, the Alma-Ata Protocol and the CIS Charter in 2008, and left the CIS in 2009.

=== Ukraine ===
According to information from the depositary (the Archive of the Government of Belarus), the Agreement is still in force for both Russia and Ukraine as of 2025. The secretary general of the organization Sergey Lebedev has stated that Ukraine has the right to withdraw from the agreement by sending a notification of withdrawal, but Ukraine has never sent such a notification as of 2024 and thus is still part of the CIS. Ukrainian foreign minister Pavlo Klimkin said that Ukraine could not withdraw from the CIS because it had never become a part of it.

=== Moldova ===
Moldova passed legislation to denounce the Belovezha Accords, as well as the Alma-Ata Protocol and the CIS Charter, on 8 April 2026. Withdrawal will be effective 1 year after formal notification of the decision to the CIS Executive Committee.
