= Alma-Ata Protocol =

Founding declarations & principles of Commonwealth of Independent States (CIS)

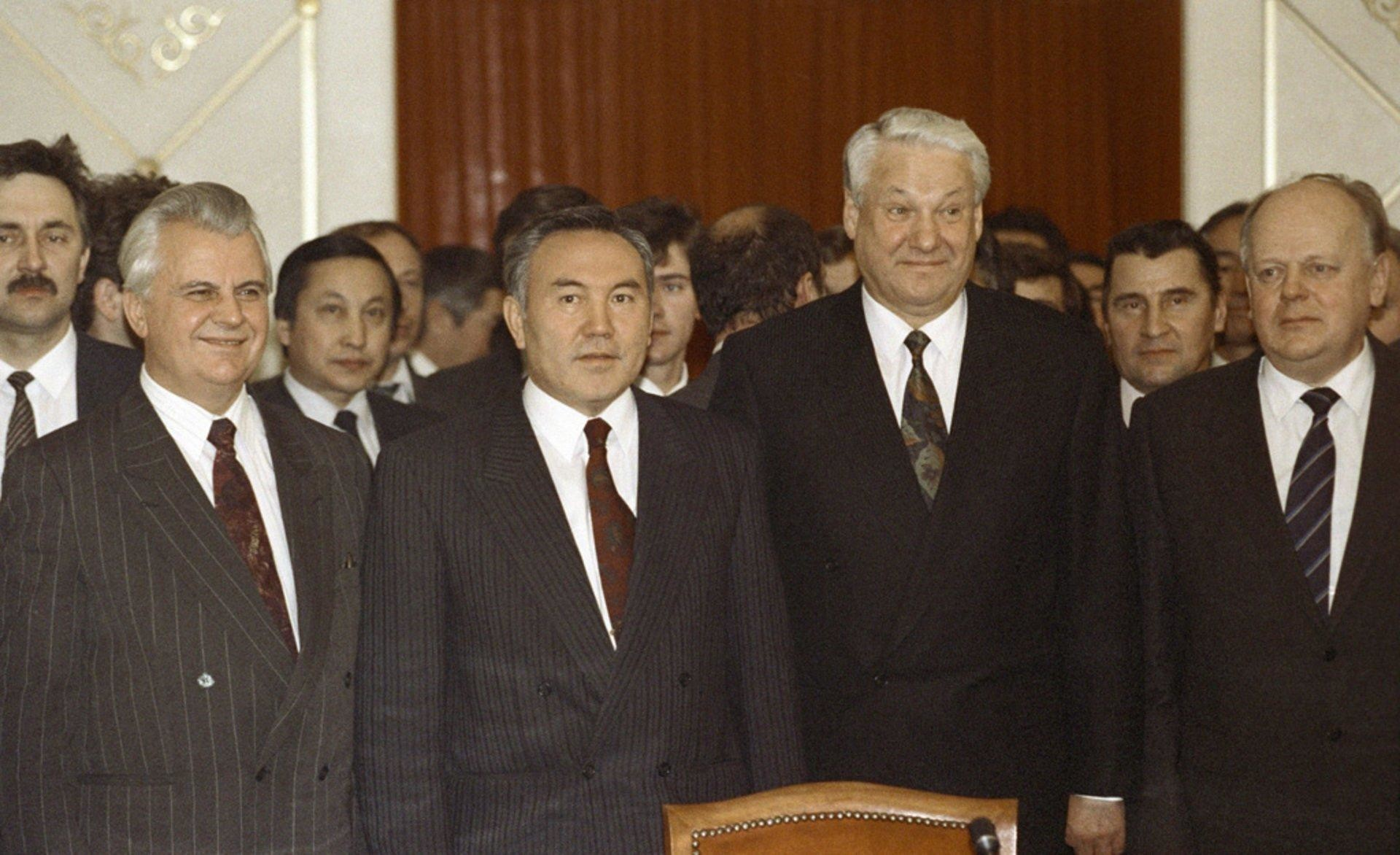
- Left to right: Ukrainian president Leonid Kravchuk, Kazakh president Nursultan Nazarbayev, Russian president Boris Yeltsin, and Belarusian head of state Stanislav Shushkevich after signing the treaty
- Type: Treaty establishing the founding declarations and principles of the Commonwealth of Independent States (CIS).
- Signed: 21 December 1991
- Location: Alma-Ata, Kazakhstan, Soviet Union
- Effective: 21 December 1991
- Signatories: Russia: Boris Yeltsin; Belarus: Stanislav Shushkevich; Ukraine: Leonid Kravchuk; Armenia: Levon Ter-Petrosyan; Azerbaijan: Ayaz Mutallibov; Kazakhstan: Nursultan Nazarbayev; Kyrgyzstan: Askar Akayev; Moldova: Mircea Snegur (Note: Moldova denounced the protocol, effective 8 April 2027.); Tajikistan: Rahmon Nabiyev; Turkmenistan: Saparmurat Niyazov; Uzbekistan: Islam Karimov
- Depositary: Belarus
- Language: Russian

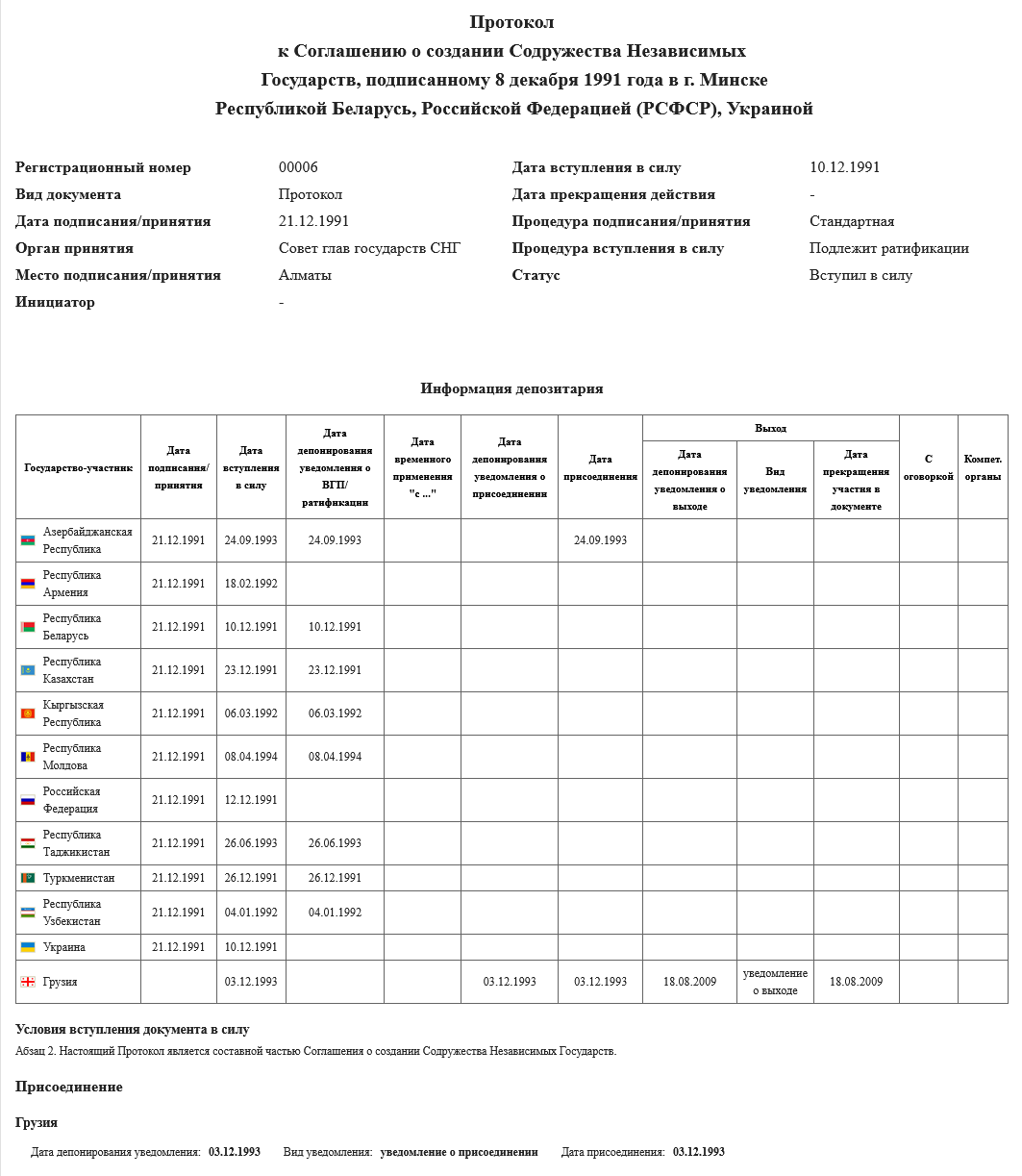
The Protocol to the Agreement on the Creation of the Commonwealth of Independent States dated 21 December 1991. The information from the depository of the international agreement published on the Unified Register of Legal Acts and Other Documents of the Commonwealth of Independent States (under the executive committee of the Commonwealth of Independent States) as of 2024.

The Alma-Ata Protocols were the founding declarations and principles of the Commonwealth of Independent States (CIS). The leaders of Russia, Ukraine, and Belarus had agreed to the Belovezha Accords on 8 December 1991, declaring the Soviet Union dissolved and forming the CIS. On 21 December 1991, Armenia, Azerbaijan, Belarus, Kazakhstan, Kyrgyzstan, Moldova, Russia, Tajikistan, Turkmenistan, Ukraine, and Uzbekistan agreed to the Alma-Ata Protocols, formally establishing the CIS. The latter agreement included the original three Belovezha signatories, as well as eight additional former Soviet republics. Four former Soviet republics did not participate: Georgia, and the three Baltic states of Lithuania, Latvia and Estonia. The Baltic states consider their incorporation into the USSR in 1940 as illegal.

The protocols consisted of a declaration, three agreements and separate appendices. In addition, Marshal Yevgeny Shaposhnikov was confirmed as acting Commander-in-Chief of the Armed Forces of the Commonwealth of Independent States. A separate agreement on joint measures regarding nuclear weapons was signed by Belarus, Kazakhstan, Russia and Ukraine.

The Alma-Ata Protocols removed any doubt that the Soviet Union no longer existed "as a subject of international law and geopolitical reality" (in the words of the Belovezha Accords' preamble), since 11 of the 12 remaining republics had declared that the Soviet Union had dissolved. The signatories preemptively accepted the resignation of Soviet president Mikhail Gorbachev, who told CBS News that he would resign when he saw the CIS was a reality. Gorbachev resigned on 25 December, and the Soviet of the Republics of the Supreme Soviet of the USSR voted the Soviet Union out of existence on 26 December.

Moldova passed legislation to denounce the Alma-Ata Protocol, as well as the Belovezha Accords and the CIS Charter, on 8 April 2026. Withdrawal will be effective 1 year after formal notification of the decision to the CIS Executive Committee.

== Agreement on Councils of Heads of State and Government ==
A provisional agreement on the membership and conduct of Councils of Heads of State and Government was concluded between the members of the Commonwealth of Independent States on 30 December 1991.

== Agreement on strategic forces ==
Concluded between the 11 members of the Commonwealth of Independent States on 30 December 1991.

== Agreement on armed forces and border troops ==
Concluded between the members of the Commonwealth of Independent States on 30 December 1991.
