= CIS Charter =

International economic agreement

Charter/Statute of the Commonwealth of Independent States
- Type: Treaty establishing the bodies and functions of the Commonwealth of Independent States and defining its membership
- Signed: 22 January 1993
- Location: Minsk, Belarus
- Effective: 22 January 1994
- Signatories: (Russia) Boris Yeltsin; (Belarus) Stanislav Shushkevich; (Armenia) Levon Ter-Petrosyan; (Kazakhstan) Nursultan Nazarbayev; (Kyrgyzstan) Askar Akayev; (Tajikistan) Emomali Rahmonov; (Uzbekistan) Islam Karimov
- Parties: Russia; Belarus; Armenia; Kazakhstan; Kyrgyzstan; Moldova (Note: Moldova denounced the charter, effective 8 April 2027.); Tajikistan; Uzbekistan; Azerbaijan
- Depositary: Minsk, Belarus
- Languages: the official languages of the signatory states of the Commonwealth

The Charter of the Commonwealth of Independent States, also known as the Statute of the Commonwealth of Independent States (CIS Charter; Russian: Устав Содружества Независимых Государств, Ustav Sodruzhestva Nezavisimyh Gosudarstv, Устав СНГ), is an international agreement between the states forming the Commonwealth of Independent States (CIS).

== History ==
The Charter was signed on 22 January 1993 in Minsk by the heads of state of the Commonwealth of Independent States (CIS) and was subsequently deposited with the United Nations. It defines the objectives, bodies and functions of the CIS, as well as the criteria for membership. Russia, Belarus, Armenia, Kazakhstan, Kyrgyzstan, Moldova, Tajikistan, and Uzbekistan signed and ratified the treaty, while Azerbaijan acceded to it later. Georgia also acceded to the treaty in 1993, with the accession taking effect in 1994 but withdrew from it in 2008, with the withdrawal taking legal effect in 2009. Ukraine and Turkmenistan did not sign or accede to the treaty, although they were considered to be part of the CIS when the treaty was signed.

== Membership ==
The CIS Charter treaty agreement defines which countries are considered members of the CIS. According to Article 7, only countries that have ratified this treaty are considered members. However, the same article defines the countries that had ratified the Treaty for the Establishment of the CIS and its related protocol as "founding states of the CIS". This has created legal uncertainty, as Ukraine and Turkmenistan ratified the treaty and protocol, and therefore are considered "founding states of the CIS". Ukraine and Turkmenistan never ratified the CIS Charter, and therefore could not be considered members of the CIS, once the Charter came into effect. Nevertheless, both Ukraine and Turkmenistan have continued participating in the CIS, with Turkmenistan becoming an associate member of the CIS in August 2005, following the procedure defined in Article 8 of the Charter.

=== Ukraine ===
Ukraine never ratified the CIS Charter, but continued to participate in CIS activities until 2018. As of 2026 Ukraine remains a party to the Belovezha Accords and the Alma-Ata Protocol that created it, being recognised as one of the founding states of the CIS by the CIS Charter.

=== Georgia ===
Georgia withdrew from the CIS Charter and all other CIS-related treaties, such as the Treaty for the Establishment of the CIS and its related protocol on 18 August 2008. This decision took effect, according to the Charter, on 12 August 2009.

Georgia withdrew from the CIS Defense Ministers on 3 February 2006, as membership in that group was not compatible with participation in NATO.

=== Moldova ===
Moldova passed legislation to denounce the CIS Charter, as well as the Belovezha Accords and the Alma-Ata Protocol, on 8 April 2026. Withdrawal will be effective 1 year after formal notification of the decision to the CIS Executive Committee.

== See also ==
- Alma-Ata Protocol
