= Chwiszczej =

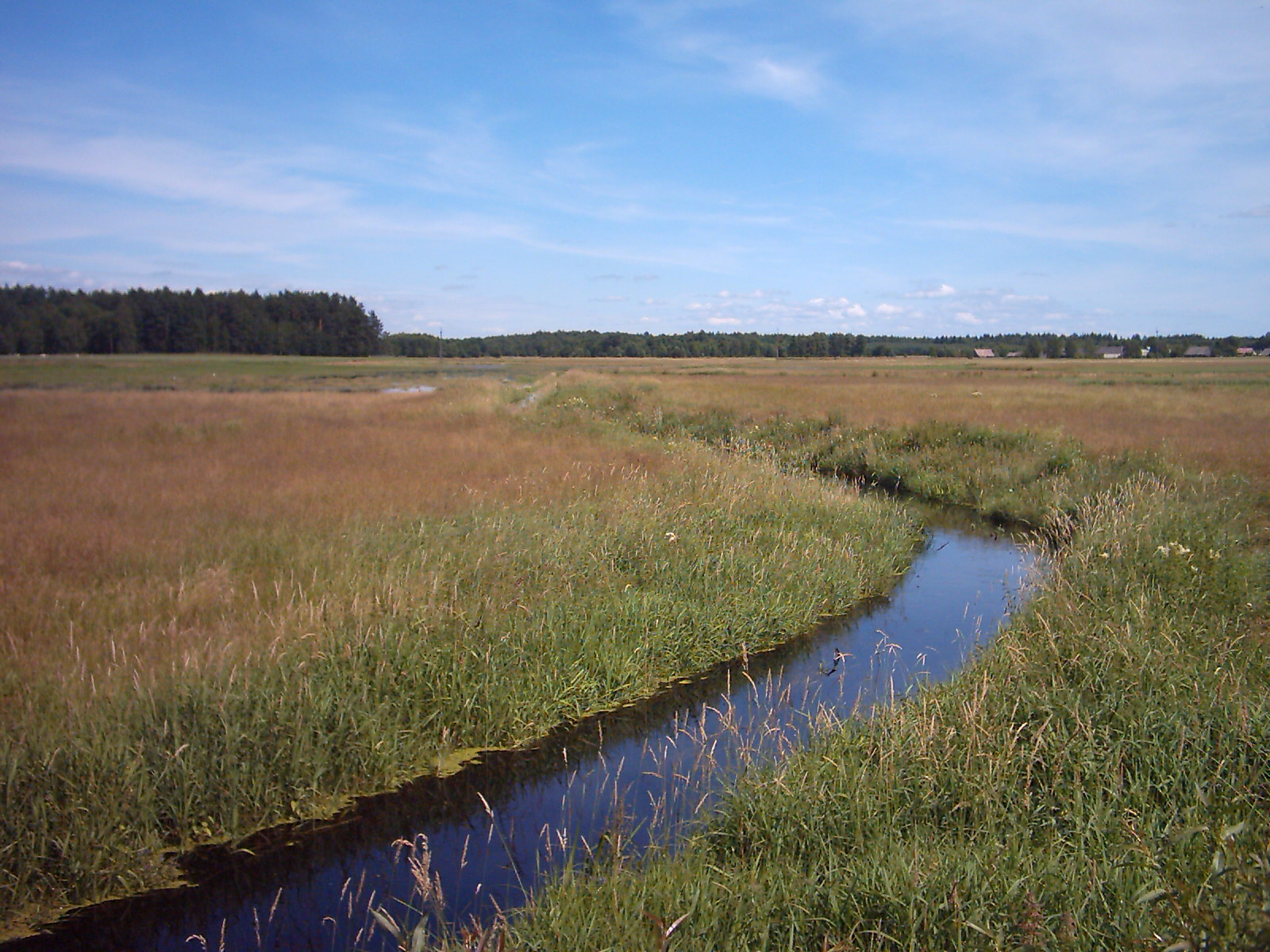
- Chwiszczej near Orzeszkowo

Location
- Country: Poland
- Voivodeship: Podlaskie
- Gmina: Gmina Hajnówka

Physical characteristics
- Source
  - location: Nowoberezowo
  - coordinates: 52°46′02.0″N 23°30′31.3″E
  - elevation: 177.4 m (582 ft)
- Mouth: Leśna Prawa
  - location: East of Łozice
  - coordinates: 52°40′32″N 23°37′03″E
  - elevation: 153.9 m (505 ft)
- Length: 16.8 km (10.4 mi)

Basin features
- Progression: Leśna Prawa→ Lyasnaya→ Bug→ Narew→ Vistula→ Baltic Sea

The Chwiszczej is a river of Poland, and constitutes a tributary of the Leśna Prawa in the Białowieża Forest.
