= Lesnoy =

Lesnoy (masculine), Lesnaya (feminine), or Lesnoye (neuter) may refer to:

== Places ==
- Lesnoy District, a district of Tver Oblast, Russia
- Lesnoy Urban Settlement, a municipal formation which the Work Settlement of Lesnoy in Pushkinsky District of Moscow Oblast, Russia is incorporated as
- Lesnoye Urban Settlement, a municipal formation which the Urban-Type Settlement of Lesnoy in Verkhnekamsky District of Kirov Oblast, Russia is incorporated as
- Lesnoy, Russia (Lesnaya, Lesnoye), several inhabited localities in Russia
- Lesnoy, alternative name of Meşəli, Khojali, Azerbaijan
- Lyasny, several inhabited localities in Belarus called 'Lesnoy' in Russian
- Lesnoi Island, the Russian name for Woody Island, Alaska
- Lesnoi Village, former name of the Tangirnaq Native Village, a federally recognized Alaska Native village

== Other uses ==
- Lesnoy (surname)
- Lesnaya (disambiguation)
