= Białowieża Forest =

Forest in Poland and Belarus

- Puszcza Białowieska (Polish); Белавежская пушча (Belarusian); Беловежская пуща (Russian)
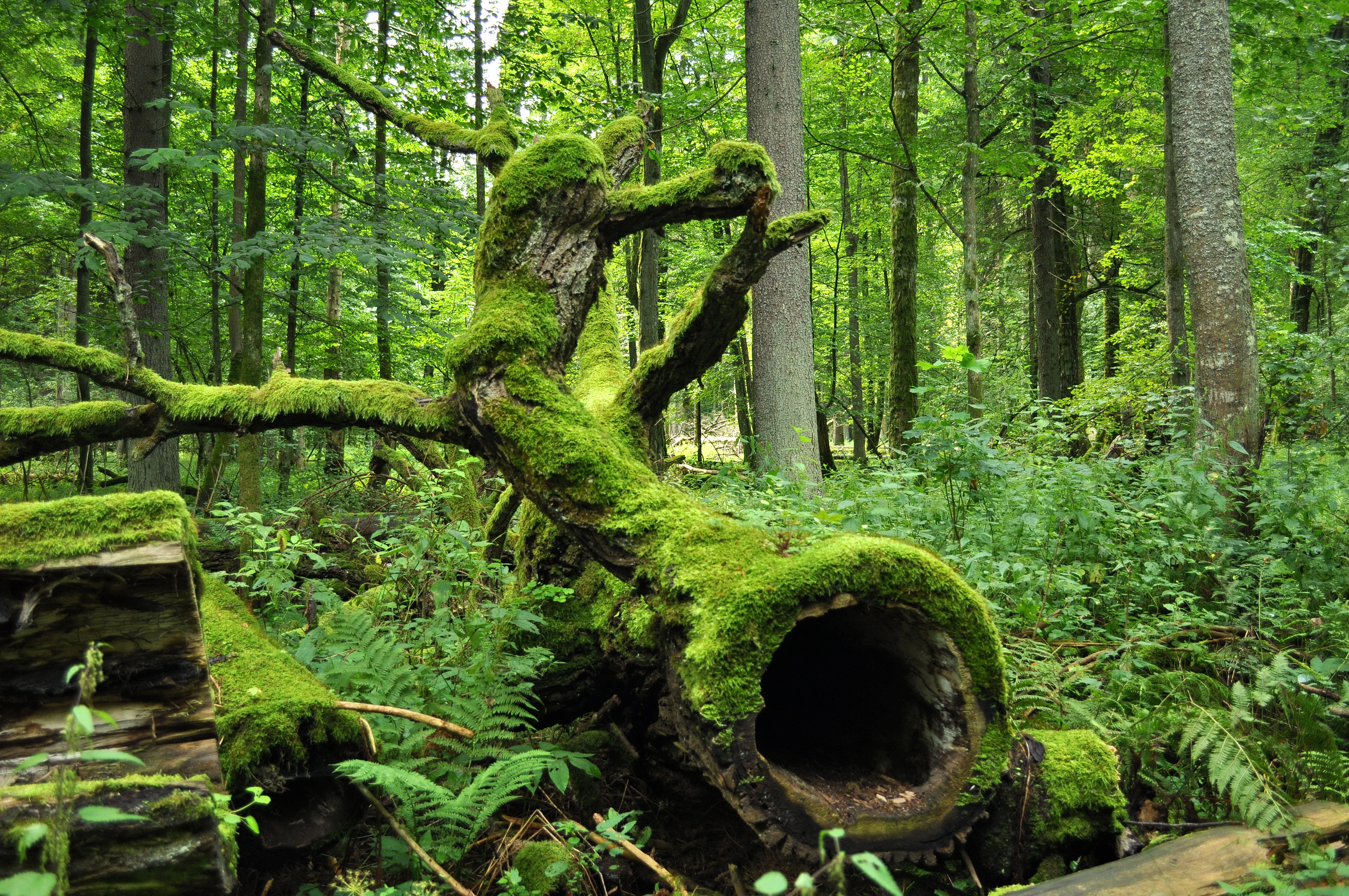
- Fallen tree in the Białowieża Forest

- Location within Poland Location within Belarus
- Location: Podlaskie Voivodeship, Poland; Grodno and Brest oblasts, Belarus
- Nearest city: Hajnówka, Poland
- Coordinates: 52°45′N 23°57′E
- Area: 3,085.8 km^{2} (1,191.4 sq mi)
- Established: 11 August 1932
- Governing body: Ministries of Environment of Poland and Belarus

UNESCO World Heritage Site
- Criteria: Natural: ix, x
- Reference: 33
- Inscription: 1979 (3rd Session)
- Extensions: 1992, 2014

Białowieża Forest (Note: Polish: Puszcza Białowieska; Belarusian: Белавежская пушча, romanized: Biełaviežskaja pušča; Russian: Беловежская пуща, romanized: Belovežskaja pušča) is a large forest complex and World Heritage Area straddling the border between Poland and Belarus. It is one of the last and the largest remaining parts of the immense primeval forest that once stretched across the European Plain. The forest is home to more than 800 European bison, Europe's heaviest land animal.

The forest has been designated a UNESCO World Heritage Site and an EU Natura 2000 Special Area of Conservation. The World Heritage Committee, through its decision of June 2014, approved the extension of the UNESCO World Heritage site "Belovezhskaya Pushcha / Białowieża Forest, Belarus, Poland", which became "Białowieża Forest, Belarus, Poland". It straddles the border between Podlachia historical region in Poland and the Brest and Grodno Oblasts in Belarus, and is 62 kilometres (39 miles) southeast of Białystok, Poland and 70 kilometres (43 miles) north of Brest, Belarus. The Białowieża Forest World Heritage site covers a total area of 141,885 ha (1,418.85 km^{2}; 547.82 sq mi). Since the border between the two countries runs through the forest, there is a border crossing available for hikers and cyclists.

UNESCO's Man and the Biosphere Programme designated the Polish Biosphere Reserve as Białowieża in 1976, and the Belarusian Biosphere Reserve as Biełavieskaja pušča in 1993. In 2025, the Belarusian part spanned 213,200 ha (2,132 km^{2}; 823 sq mi), subdivided into property and buffer zones.

== Name ==
The Białowieża Forest takes its name from the Polish village of Białowieża, which is located in the middle of the forest and was probably one of the first human settlements in the area. Białowieża means "White Tower" in Polish. The name stems from the white wooden hunting-manor established in the village by Władysław II Jagiełło, the Grand Duke of Lithuania and later King of Poland who enjoyed hunting trips in the forest, which was then part of the Grand Duchy of Lithuania. The modern Belarusian name for the forest is Biełaviežskaja pušča (Белавежская пушча), although both the Belarusian authorities and UNESCO use the official Russian name Belovezhskaya pushcha (Беловежская пуща) from before the 1991 dissolution of the Soviet Union.

== Nature protection ==
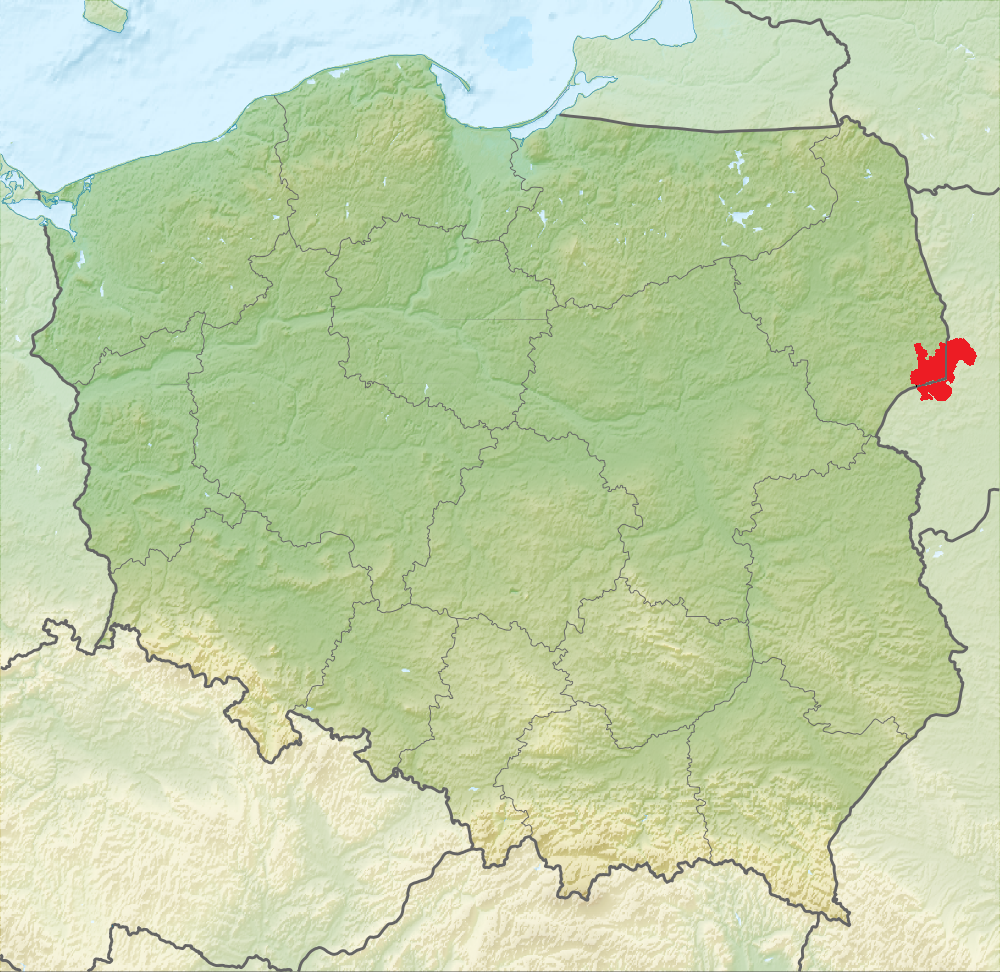
Approximate range of the Białowieża Primeval Forest in Poland and Belarus.

=== Białowieża National Park, Poland ===
On the Polish side, part of the Białowieża Forest is protected as the Białowieża National Park (Polish: Białowieski Park Narodowy), with an area of about 105 km^{2} (41 sq mi). There is also the Białowieża Glade (Polish: Polana Białowieska), with a complex of buildings once owned by the tsars of Russia during the Partitions of Poland. At present, a hotel and restaurant with a car park is located there. Guided tours into the strictly protected areas of the park can be arranged on foot, bike or by horse-drawn carriage. Approximately 120,000–150,000 tourists visit the Polish part of the forest annually (about 10,000 of them are from other countries). Among the attractions are birdwatching with local ornithologists, the chance to observe rare birds, pygmy owl observations, watching bison in their natural environment, and sledge as well as carriage rides, with a bonfire. Expert nature guides can also be found in the nearby urban centres. Tours are possible all year round. The popular village of Białowieża lies within the forest.

=== Belavezhskaya Pushcha National Park, Belarus ===
The Belarusian portion of the World Heritage site spans 823 km^{2} (318 sq mi) with an additional 1,309 km^{2} (505 sq mi) designated as a buffer zone. A significant portion of this area is within Belavezhskaya Pushcha National Park with an area of 1,501 km^{2} (580 sq mi). The core, strictly protected, area covers 39%, the zone of regulated use 25%, and the touristic zone and economic zone combined 36%. The Belovezhskaya pushcha headquarters at Kamieniuki include laboratory facilities and a zoo where European bison (reintroduced into the park in 1929), konik (a semi-wild horse), wild boar, Eurasian elk and other indigenous animals may be viewed in enclosures of their natural habitat. A new attraction there is a New Year's museum with Ded Moroz (the East Slavic counterpart of Father Christmas).

== History ==
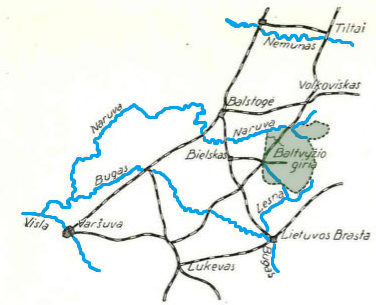
Map of the forest's location between the rivers Narew and Bug (river)

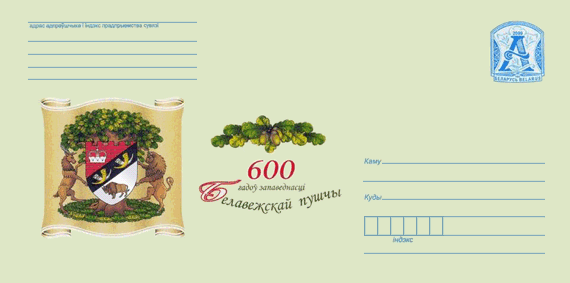
Belovezhskaya Pushcha coat of arms on Pre-Stamped Envelope of the Belarus, 2009: 600th Anniversary of Belovezhskaya Pushcha reserve status

The entire area of northeastern Europe was originally covered by ancient woodland similar to that of the Białowieża Forest. Until about the 14th century, travel through the woodland was limited to river routes; roads and bridges appeared much later. Limited hunting rights were granted throughout the forest in the 14th century. In the 15th century the forest became a property of Grand Duke Jogaila. A wooden manor in Białowieża became his refuge during a plague pandemic in 1426. The protection of bison stretches back to at least 1518, when some nobles were granted hunting privileges in the forest, but not for bison. Another notable piece of legislation on the protection of the forest dates to 1553, when a document issued by Sigismund I instituted the death penalty for poaching a bison. The King also built a new wooden hunting manor in a village of Białowieża, which became the namesake for the whole complex. Since Białowieża means the "white tower", the corresponding Puszcza Białowieska translates as the "forest of the white tower". The Tower of Kamyenyets on the Belarusian side, built of red brick, is also referred to as the White Tower (Belaya Vezha) even though it was never white, perhaps taking the name from the pushcha.

In 1557, the forest charter was issued, under which a special board was established to examine forest usage. In 1639, King Vladislaus IV issued the "Białowieża royal forest decree" (Ordynacja Puszczy J.K. Mości leśnictwa Białowieskiego). The document freed all serfs living in the forest in exchange for their service as osocznicy, or royal foresters. They were also freed of taxes in exchange for taking care of the forest. The forest was divided into triangular areas called (straże), with their center in Białowieża. By the end of the 18th century, there were 13 such areas.

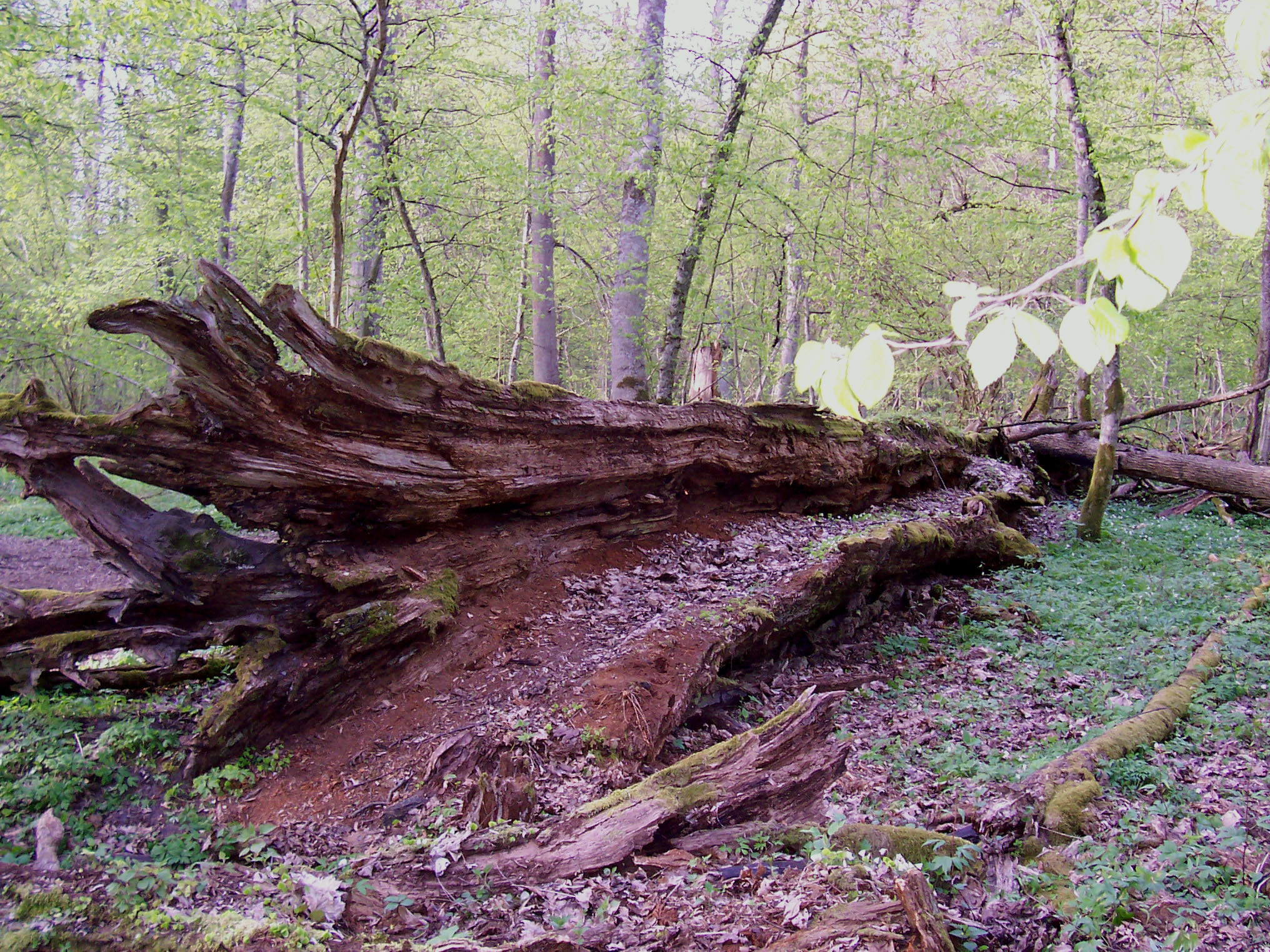
Part of primaeval forest with a dead 450-year-old oak in Białowieża National Park, Poland

Until the reign of King John II Casimir, the forest was mostly unpopulated. However, in the late 17th century, several small villages were established for development of local iron-ore deposits and tar production. The villages were populated with settlers from Masovia and Podlaskie.

Contrary to popular belief, visits by Polish royalty to the forest were rare. Between 1409 and 1784, there were fewer than twenty such visits, and even fewer were connected to hunting.

=== Russian Empire ===
In 1795, as a result of the Third Partition of Poland, the forest fell under Russian control. The land, along with the foresters living there, was given to Russian generals. Forest protection collapsed, leading to logging and poaching. Local authorities reported that fewer than 200 bison remained alive, a drop from 300 at the end of Polish rule. Bison protection and the foresters' former privileges were restored in 1802, after Alexander I ascended to the throne. Consequently, the number of bison grew to 350 by 1809 and 772 by 1830. Hunting without royal permission was completely banned in 1820, leading to an increase in the wolf population. Wolf hunting was then permitted in 1829 and later even received government funding. Another change introduced by Russian authorities was strengthening fire protection. This led to the replacement of small, regular fires with rare, large ones, which occurred three times in the early 19th century: in 1811, 1819, and 1834. The forest was only partially affected by the Napoleonic Wars with the main battles taking place outside of it.

Led by their forstmeister, 120 of the 135 guards and riflemen joined the Polish uprising of 1830-31. As a result, most foresters were dismissed and replaced by veterans of the Russian military. The forest was reorganized into four forestry districts during this period. These districts were guarded by 77 families of reliable riflemen, while 73 families of beaters continued in their roles. Most former guards were relieved from service but were allowed to remain on the land. The forest was inventoried in the 1840s and found to have an area of 1,285 km^{2} (496 sq mi). The forest proper accounted for 961 km^{2} (371 sq mi), with the remaining area consisting of peatlands, sands, arable land, pastures, and other features. Pine trees dominated two-thirds of the forest's area, spruce covered one-fifth, and oak comprised one-thirteenth. Between 1847 and 1859, Polish agronomist Leopold Walicki successfully created fifteen hybrids of bison and cattle, including the one and only known fertile male hybrid from the first generation.

The January Uprising of 1863 received far less support from locals; however, the fighting devastated the forest, leading to a decrease in the bison population by 377 in a single year. The first royal hunt after the forest came under Russian control occurred in 1860, during Alexander II's visit. Six additional hunts were held there up to 1885. As a result, forest management shifted its focus from commercial forestry to treating the forest as a hunting ground.

The forest was inventoried in 1870, at which point its area was determined to be 1,023 km^{2} (395 sq mi). The reduction in size was connected to the allocation of land to peasants as part of the Great Reforms. The authorities continued their policy of eliminating predators, which led to the eradication of brown bears and a drastic reduction in the populations of wolves and lynx.

In 1888, the forest was transferred to the direct control of the Ministry of the Imperial Court, effectively turning it into the Emperor's private hunting reserve. Upon its transfer, a royal palace, park, roads, and a railway were constructed, along with an administrative building and apartments for the forest administration. In the 1890s, authorities successfully reintroduced red deer, which had been extinct in the area. Nicholas II aimed to preserve the forest's primeval appearance, limiting tree cutting and opening a natural history museum of the forest in 1914. The last Russian royalty visit was by Nicholas II in 1912.

During the period of Russian rule, 153 bison were hunted for recreational purposes, 56 for scientific study, and 72 were captured alive for zoos, cross-breeding, or taming experiments. Sometimes such transfers were hindered by political conditions, such as the deterioration of Franco-Russian relations in the 1860s, which resulted in a bison not being sent to Strasbourg.

=== 20th-century wartime damage and restoration ===
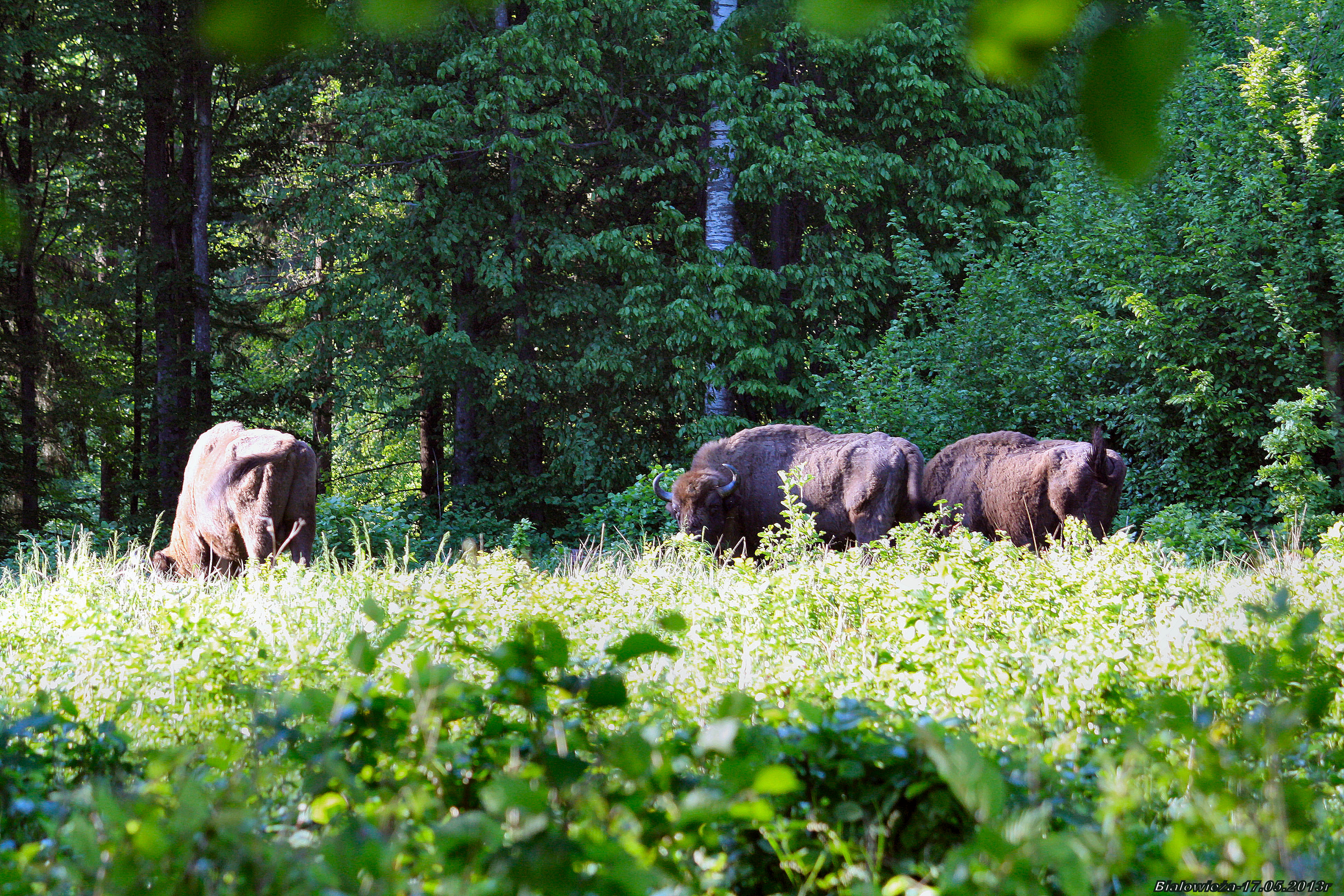
Bison in Białowieża Forest

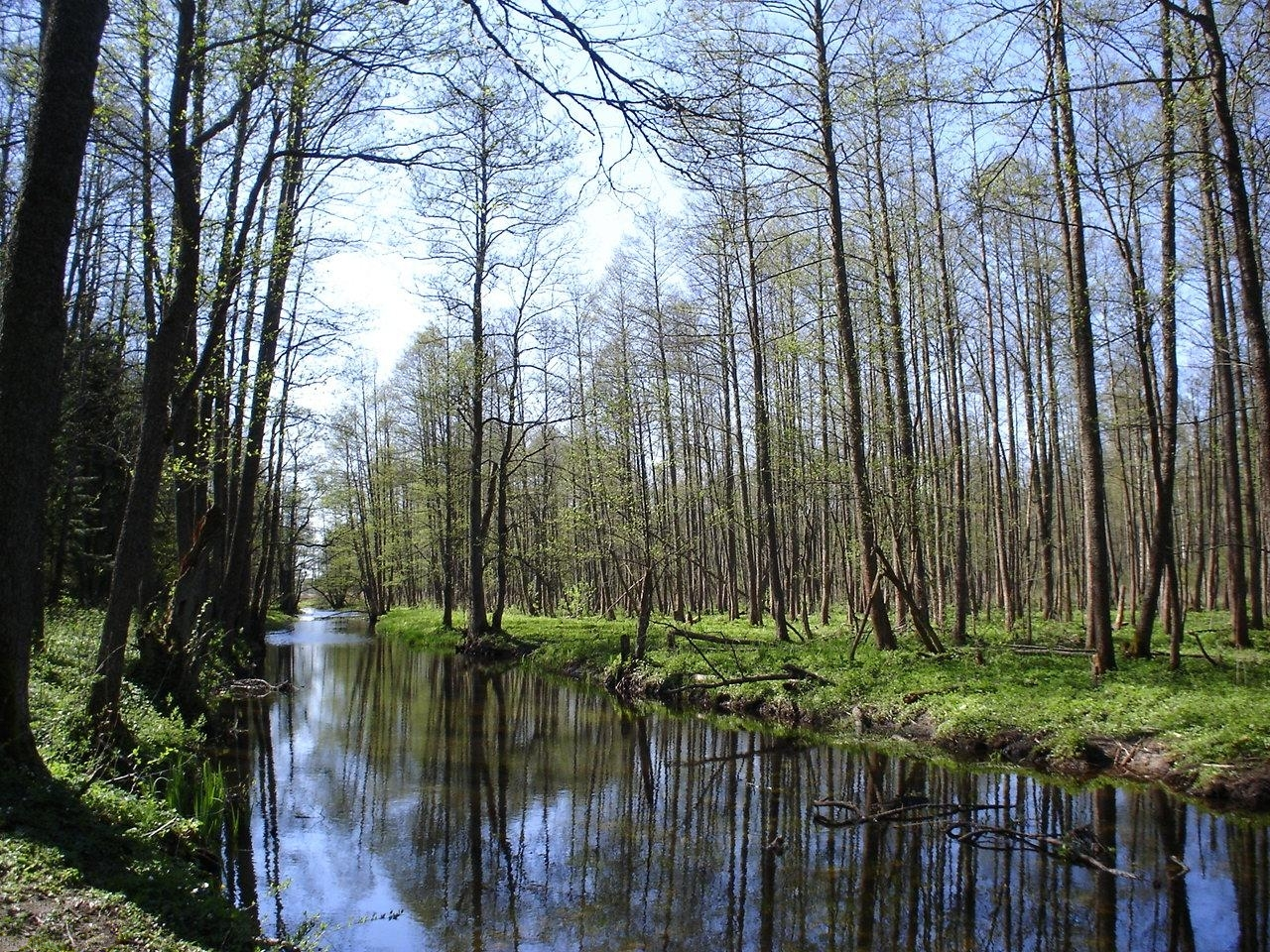
Royal Oaks Trail, Białowieża Forest

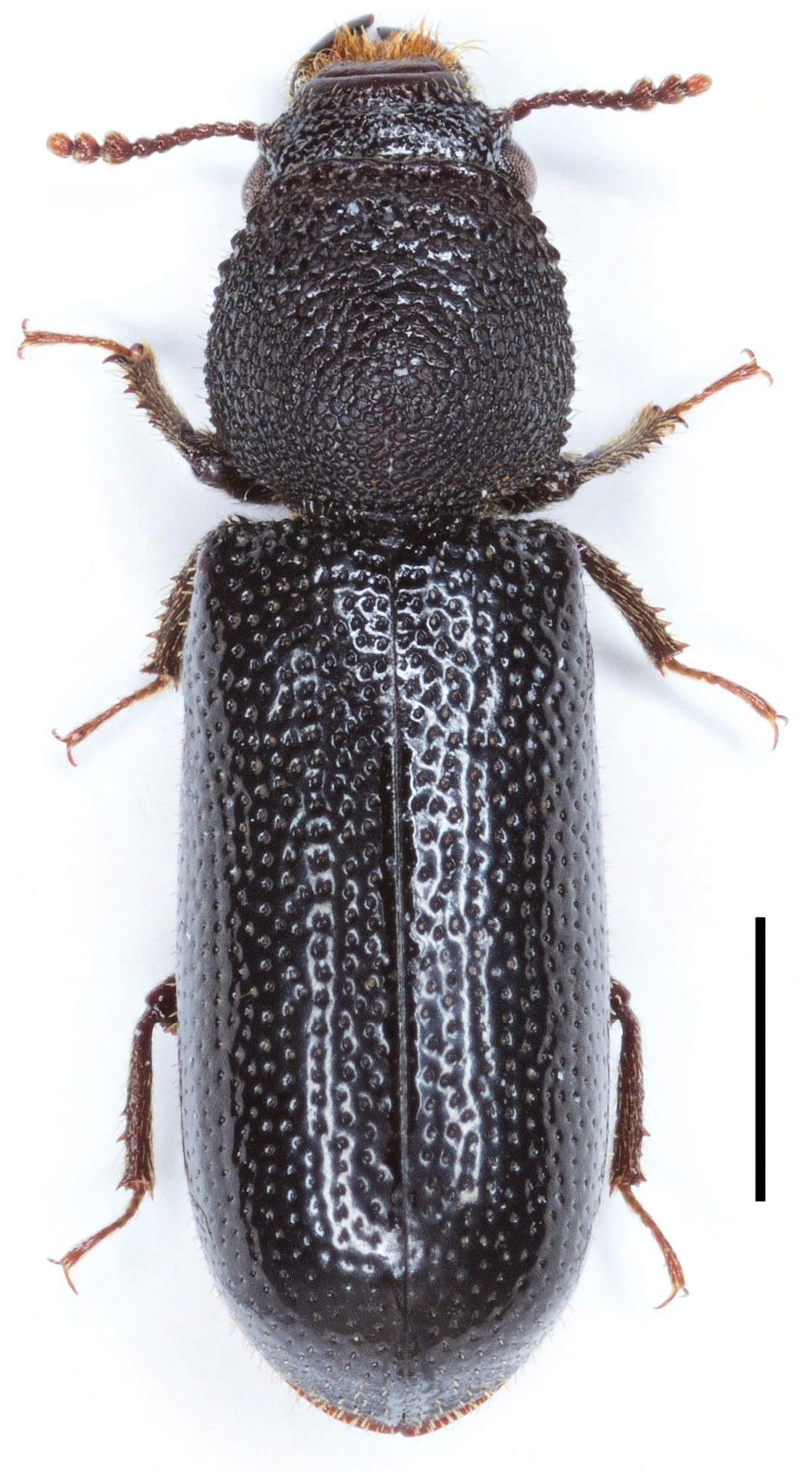
Stephanopachys linearis specimen collected in Białowieża Forest in 2015.

During World War I the forest suffered the greatest losses to the forest in history. German troops, part of the 9th Army commanded by Prince Leopold of Bavaria, entered Bialowieza and the forest on August 17, 1915. In order to use the forest for military purposes, the Bialowieza Military Forestry Administration was established, headed by Major Georg Escherich. The German occupation of the area lasted until December 1918. During this period, the forest experienced extensive timber extraction: of the forest's estimated abundance of 32 million m^{3} of timber, 5 million m^{3} were cut down. (Note: 2.6 million m^{3} according to another source.) During three years of German occupation, six sawmills were built and 250 kilometres (155 miles) of railway tracks were laid in the forest to support the local industry. The German army also started to hunt the animals. By September 25, 1915, the bison population had decreased from approximately 700 to 200, which prompted the issuance of an order forbidding hunting in the reserve. However, German soldiers, poachers and Soviet marauders continued the slaughter until February 1919 when the area was captured by the Polish army. The Polish government proclaimed that the last bison had been killed before the army's arrival, but there are claims that bison were present in the forest in April 1919 or even in 1921. Thousands of deer and wild boar had also been shot.

After the Polish–Soviet War in 1921, the core of the forest was declared a National Reserve. In 1923, Professor Józef Paczoski, a pioneer of the science of phytosociology, became a scientific manager of the forest reserves in the Białowieża Forest. He carried out detailed studies of the structure of forest vegetation there.

In 1923 it was known that only 54 European bison survived in zoos all around the world, none of them in Poland. In 1929, a small herd of four was bought by the Polish state from various zoos and from the Western Caucasus (where the bison was to become extinct just a few years later). These animals were of the slightly different Caucasian subspecies (Bison bonasus caucasicus). To protect them, in 1932 most of the forest was declared a national park. The reintroduction proved successful, and by 1939 there were 16 bison in Białowieża National Park. One of them, a male from the zoo in Pszczyna, is the founder of almost the entire population of bison that inhabits the forest, he was descendant of a pair given to the Duke of Pszczyna by Tsar Alexander II in 1865.

In 1939 the local inhabitants of Polish ethnicity were deported to remote areas of the Soviet Union and replaced by Soviet forest workers. In 1941 the forest was occupied by Germans and the Russian Soviet inhabitants were also expelled. Hermann Göring planned to create the largest hunting reserve in the world there. After July 1941 the forest became a refuge for both Polish and Soviet partisans and Nazi authorities organised mass executions. A few graves of people who were killed by the Gestapo can still be seen in the forest. (Hermann Göring directed anti-partisan operations by Luftwaffe security battalions in the Białowieża Forest between 1942 and 1944 that resulted in the murder of thousands of Jews and Polish civilians.) In July 1944 the area was overtaken by the Red Army. Withdrawing Wehrmacht troops demolished the historic Białowieża hunting manor.

After the war, the forest's territory was divided between Poland and the Belarusian SSR of the Soviet Union. The chairman of the Polish Committee of National Liberation, Edward Ochab, wrote in his memoirs regarding the negotiations about the demarcation of the border in the area of Białowieża Forest. According to his view, the Soviet officials repeated many times that they were not interested in enlarging their vast state, but only in sorting out the issue of Belarusian and Ukrainian nationalities in the borderland area (Kresy). Ochab emphasized to his Soviet negotiators that the problem didn't exist in Białowieża Forest and that the forest had a special historical place in the Polish national memory as a place where guerilla fights took place during the uprising against the tsarist regime. In addition, Poland had its forests decimated by the Germans during the occupation of Poland and finally, the forest was Poland's raw material basin for the timber industry in Hajnówka. According to Ochab's memories, when Stalin fiercely insisted on the need to "close the case", Ochab requested a break for consultations in the nearby room. He told his associates from the PKWN that he would resign from his position as the chairman of that body, as he could not find enough spiritual strength and inner conviction to promote Polish–Soviet friendship. The conversation was interrupted and the delegation was escorted to the premises in the seat Union of Polish Patriots and waited for news from the Soviet government. After a half an hour or so, Soviet Foreign Minister Vyacheslav Molotov called and informed Ochab by phone that Stalin had agreed to transfer half of the forest to Poland including the village of Białowieża and congratulated him. According to Ochab, he was unhappy with the decision as he was counting on the entire Białowieża Forest.

The Soviet part was put under public administration while Poland reopened the Białowieża National Park in 1947. Belovezhskaya Pushcha was protected under Decision No. 657 of the Council of People's Commissars of the Soviet Union, 9 October 1944; Order No. 2252-P of the USSR Council of Ministers, 9 August 1957; and Decree No. 352 of the Byelorussian SSR Council of Ministers, 16 September 1991.

In December 1991, the Belavezha Accords, the decision to dissolve the Soviet Union, were signed at a meeting in the Belarusian part of the reserve by the leaders of Ukraine, Russia and Belarus.

== Composition and ecology ==
Since the forest contains the last remnants of old-growth forests in the North European Plain, it has been the subject of intensive research into the history, succession stages, and community composition of individual tree species and assemblages.

=== Named oaks ===
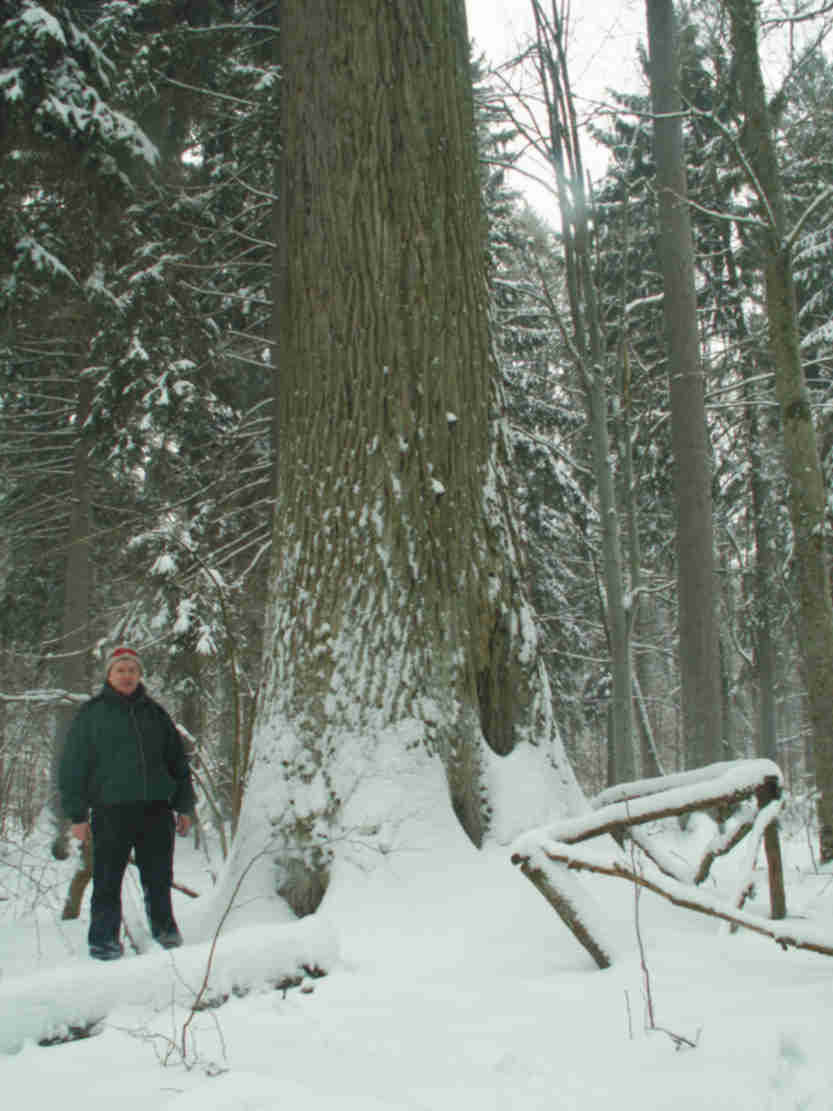
The King of Nieznanowo oak

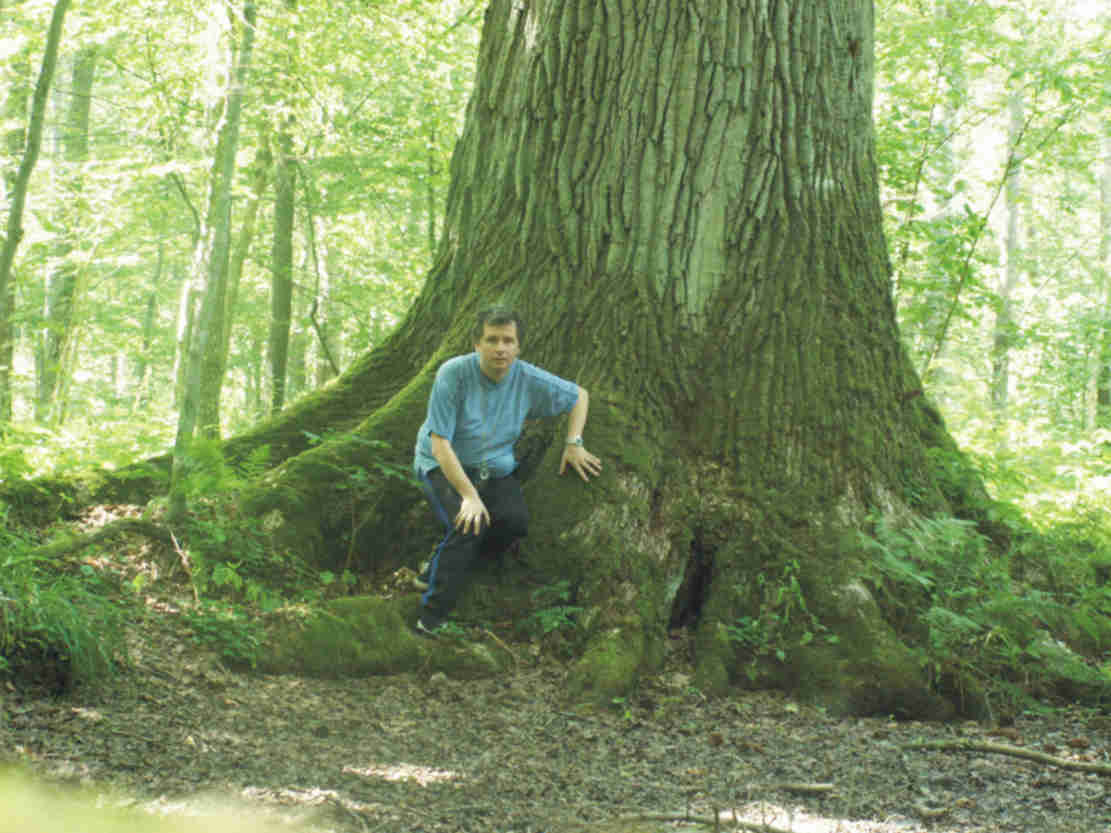
Emperor of the South oak

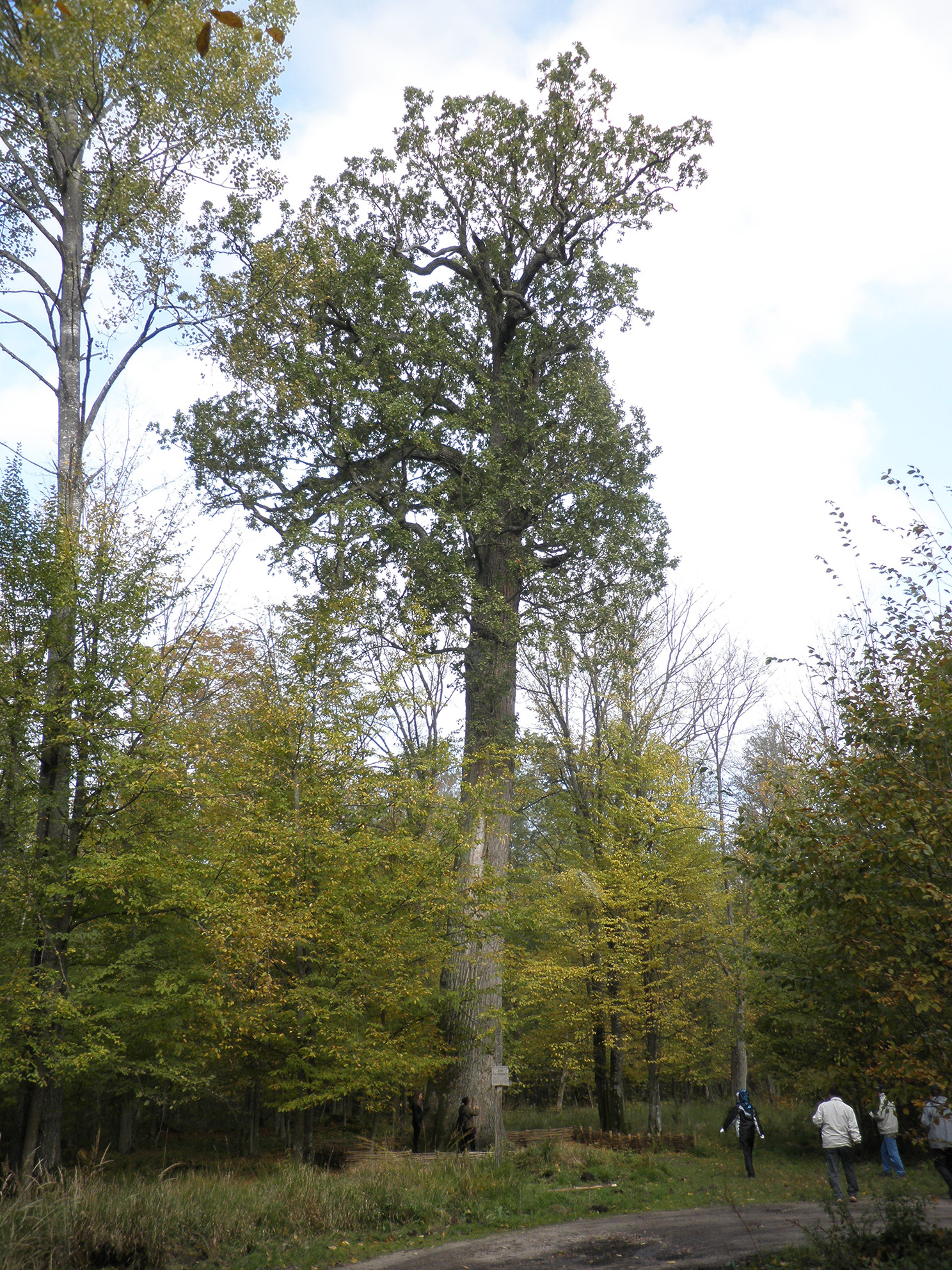
Patriarch Oak, one of the oldest oaks in the Belovezhskaya Pushcha National Park

The forest contains a number of large, ancient pedunculate oaks (Quercus robur), some of which are individually named. Trunk circumferences are measured at breast height, 130 cm (51 in) above the ground.

- Great Mamamuszi. Circumference 690 cm (270 in) (2005), height 34 m (112 ft). One of the thickest oaks in the forest, with a beautiful column-like trunk. The tree's name comes from Molière's The Bourgeois Gentleman, in which the main protagonist (Mr Jourdain) was appointed the Mamamouchi by a Turkish ambassador. Since 1989 the tree's circumference grew by 10 cm (3.9 in). Of all the oaks in Białowieża Forest with a circumference above 600 cm (240 in), it is in the best condition.
- The King of Nieznanowo. Circumference 620 cm (240 in), height 38 m (125 ft). This tree has one of the most columnar trunks among the oaks in Białowieża Forest. The first branches arise at the height of 18 m. It has been gradually dying since 1998. As of 2005, only two small branches still have leaves. Since the mid-1960s its trunk circumference has grown by about 45 cm (18 in).
- Emperor of the South. Circumference 610 centimetres (240 in), height 40 m (130 ft). The tree shows no clear signs of dying.
- Emperor of the North. Circumference 605 cm (238 in), height 37 m (121 ft). The tree has a very regular trunk and shows no clear signs of dying.
- Southern Cross. Circumference 630 cm (250 in), height 36 m (118 ft). At the base of the trunk it has a considerable lesion in the bark on the eastern side. From the mid-1960s its circumference has grown by 65 cm (26 in). The name comes from the shape of its crown, whose main branches evoke a cross.
- The Guardian of Zwierzyniec. Circumference 658 cm (259 in), height 37 m (121 ft). This is one of the thickest oaks in the forest. The tree is largely bent down westwards, which most probably has contributed to the large circumference of the trunk at its base. All the branches are live, indicating that the tree is in good condition.
- Barrel Oak. Circumference 740 cm (290 in), height over 30 m (98 ft). This tree is named for its barrel-shaped trunk, and is the oak which reaches the greatest trunk circumference among the Białowieża oaks. The tree is dead and largely devoid of bark, and is estimated to be around 450 years old.
- Dominator Oak. Circumference 680 cm (270 in), height over 36 m (118 ft). One of the thickest oaks of the Białowieża, the tree has been dead since 1992 and its trunk is now largely devoid of bark. For many years it dominated the Białowieża Forest as far as size is concerned. Its age is estimated at 450 years.
- The Jagiełło Oak. Circumference (when growing) 550 cm (220 in), height 39 m (128 ft). It blew down in 1974, but is probably the most famous of the trees in the forest. It is said that King Władysław II Jagiełło rested beneath it before the Battle of Grunwald (Bitwa Pod Grunwaldem) in 1410, although the tree is believed to have been only 450 years old when it blew down.
- Tsar Oak (Polish) (Polish: Dąb Car) of Poland. Circumference 640 cm (250 in), height 41 m (135 ft). The tree's volume has been estimated at 75 m^{3} (2,600 cu ft). It died in 1984, and for over 20 years it has been standing dead on the edge of the valley of Leśna Prawa river. Today the trunk is totally devoid of bark and some of the branches have broken off and lie at the base of the trunk.
- Patriarch Oak (Russian: Патриарх-Дуб). One of the oldest oaks in the Belarusian National Park, standing 31 m (102 ft) tall, having a diameter in excess of 2 m (6.6 ft), and being over 550 years of age. It stands 1 kilometre (0.6 miles) from the estate of Ded Moroz.

== Logging ==
Some 84% of the 60,000 hectares (150,000 acres) of Polish forest is outside the national park. Almost half of all the wood in the forest is dead, 10 times more than in managed forests, with half the 12,000 species depending on decaying logs, including the near-threatened beetle Cucujus cinnaberinus. Traditional forest management would remove the dead wood, as a fire risk. In 2011, Zdzisław Szkiruć, director of the Białowieża National Park, said that cutting and replanting allows for re-establishment of the forest in 50 years, rather than the 300–400 years that nature would require; environmentalist Janusz Korbel argued that the unique nature of the primeval forest demands a lighter style of management. Andrzej Kraszewski, Poland's environment minister from February 2010 to November 2011, sought to increase protection over the whole forest, starting with a more modest 12,000–14,000-hectare (30,000–35,000-acre) expansion, against opposition from the local community and the Forestry Service.

Environmentalists say that logging is threatening the flora and fauna in the forest, including species of rare birds, such as the white-backed woodpecker, who lost 30% of their population in forestry-managed areas in the 1990s and 2000s. Poland's state forestry board claims the logging is for protection and for ecological reasons, protecting against the European spruce bark beetle. In 2012, the amount of wood that can be extracted by foresters annually was briefly reduced from about 120,000 m^{3} (4,200,000 cu ft) to 48,500 m^{3} (1,700,000 cu ft), approximately 20,000,000 board feet, most which is sold locally, mainly as firewood.

On 25 March 2016, Jan Szyszko, Poland's environment minister, a former forester and forestry academic, announced that he would approve a tripling of logging in the forest, from the 2012–21 limit of 63,000 m^{3} (2,200,000 cu ft) – almost exhausted at the time – to 188,000 m^{3} (6,600,000 cu ft) to combat an infestation of the bark beetle. Robert Cyglicki, head of Greenpeace Polska, argued that logging to fight the bark beetle would "bring more damage than benefits", gathering more than 120,000 signatures to petition Prime Minister Beata Szydło to reverse Szyszko's move. Greenpeace also said the logging could trigger the EU to launch punitive procedures against Poland for violating its Natura 2000 programme, though Szyszko claims that the logging plans would not apply to strictly protected areas, and claims that, rather than being 8,000 years old, as scientists claim, parts of the forest had been created by an "enterprising hand of man" on lands that centuries ago included fields of wheat and millet.

Large-scale logging started in 2017. 190,000 cubic metres of wood (160,000 to 180,000 trees) was felled, the largest volume of logging since 1988. The Polish government has ignored pleas from UNESCO to stop logging the old-growth parts of the forest, as well as a court order of the European Court of Justice to halt the logging activities. The final verdict fell on 17 April 2018, ruling that EU law has been infringed.

== In popular culture ==
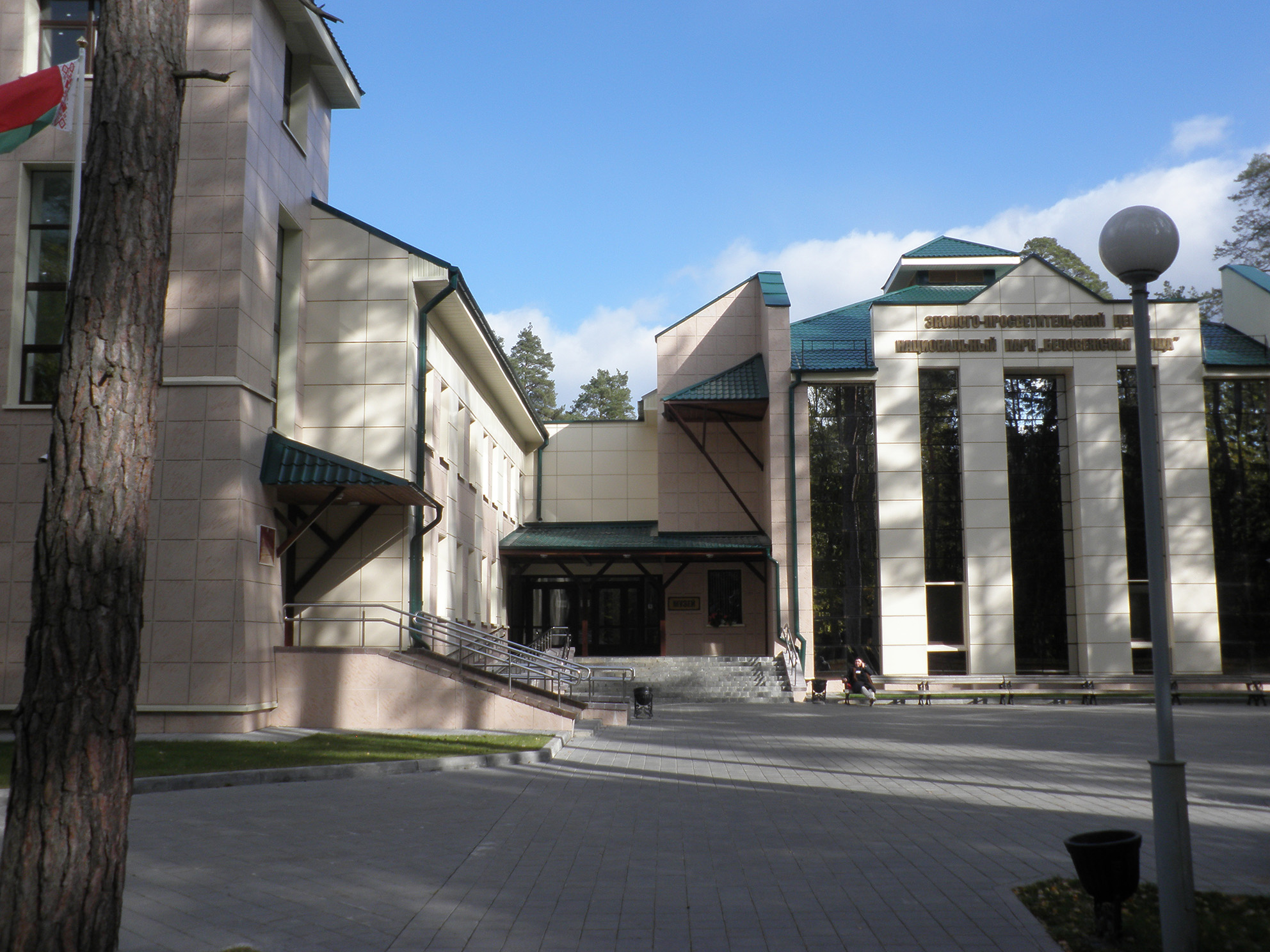
In 2009, the Ecological Education Centre was built in the Belovezhskaya Pushcha National Park.

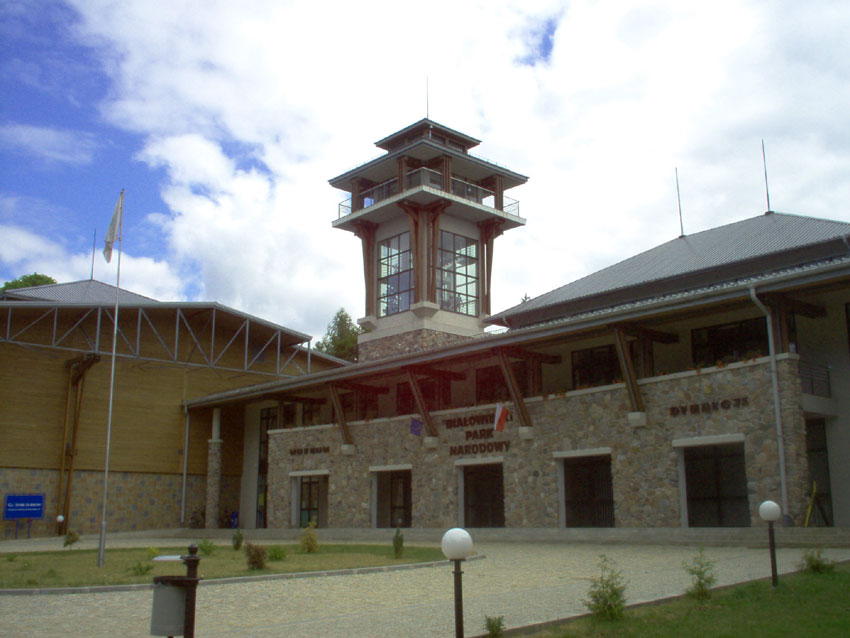
Białowieża National Park Visitor Centre

- The forest is mentioned in Upton Sinclair's seminal novel The Jungle (1906). It is the birthplace of protagonist Jurgis Rudkus.
- The forest is the subject of a Belarusian ballad Belovezhskaya Pushcha, composed in 1975 by Aleksandra Pakhmutova, with lyrics by Nikolai Dobronravov, performed by Belarusian folk band Pesniary.
- British historian Simon Schama devotes several chapters of his book Landscape and Memory (1995) to the Białowieża Forest.
- Białowieża Forest is mentioned throughout Alan Weisman's book The World Without Us (2007), which investigates places that have been abandoned or left alone and imagines what they would be like if Earth's human population suddenly disappeared.
- In Olga Tokarczuk's book Drive Your Plow Over the Bones of the Dead (original title Prowadź swój pług przez kości umarłych (2009, translated 2018 by Antonia Lloyd-Jones)), the main character, Janina Duszejko, ends up moving to the Entomologists’ research station on the edge of the forest.
- In late 2017, Wojtek Voiteque Kowalik, a senior copy editor at the Polish advertising firm Ogilvy, decided to work with Greenpeace Poland to spread awareness of the Białowieża Forest and the logging threatening it. Kowalik decided to use the game Minecraft, as he wanted to capitalize on its playerbase of 87 million. Kowalik reasoned Minecraft was a form of social media, drawing parallels between the YouTube and Twitch communities dedicated to the game and the video arcades of his youth. Kowalik contacted Danish company GeoBoxers, who had previously recreated all of Denmark in Minecraft in 1:1 scale, and convinced them to do the same for Białowieża Forest. In return Ogilvy and Greenpeace provided reference material for Geoboxers in the form of a 3D topographical map of the 700-square-kilometre (270 mi^{2}) forest made from hundreds of images and maps of Białowieża Forest that took six weeks to complete.
- The action of a role-playing video game Werewolf: The Apocalypse – Heart of the Forest developed by Different Tales and released on 13 October 2020 (for MS Windows, Linux and Mac OS) takes place in Białowieża Forest. The player takes the role of Maia Boroditch, an American woman of Polish descent, who has recurring nightmares about a forest and wolves, and travels to Białowieża in Poland to learn about her family history and discovers secrets of the primeval Białowieża Forest.
- The forest is a key focus in the 2021 nonfiction book Into the Forest: A Holocaust Story of Survival, Triumph, and Love by Rebecca Frankel. The book describes the experience of a Jewish family that fled into the forest during the Nazi occupation in 1942.
- The forest is the setting of author-translator Jennifer Croft's 2024 novel The Extinction of Irena Rey.

== See also ==
- Tourism in Poland
- List of national parks of Belarus
- List of national parks of Poland
- List of old-growth forests
- Perućica, a primeval forest in Europe (Bosnia and Herzegovina)
- Virgin Komi Forests, the largest forest in Europe
- Western Caucasus, the largest bison (wisent) habitat
- Hercynian Forest, an ancient forest that stretched across Western Central Europe, mentioned by Julius Caesar in De Bello Gallico

== Bibliography ==
- Kossak, Simona (2001). The Białowieża forest saga. Muza SA. ISBN 9788373190665.
- Kozlo, P. G.; et al. (2011). Зубр в Беларуси [Bison in Belarus] (in Russian) (2nd ed.). Minsk: Belaruskaia navuka. ISBN 978-985-08-1332-9.
- Samojlik, Tomasz (2005). Conservation and Hunting: Białowieża Forest in the Time of Kings. Mammal Research Institute Polish Academy of Sciences. ISBN 83-907521-6-6.
- Samojlik, Tomasz (2020). Białowieża Primeval Forest: Nature and Culture in the Nineteenth Century. Springer International Publishing. ISBN 9783030334796.
- Krasinska, Malgorzata; Krasinski, Zbigniew (2013). European Bison. The Nature Monograph (2nd ed.). Springer Berlin Heidelberg. ISBN 978-3-642-36554-6.
