= Belovezhskaya Pushcha National Park =

National park in Belarus, adjacent to its border with Poland

- Национальный парк «Беловежская пуща» (Russian); Natsionalny park "Belovezhskaya pushcha" (Russian); Нацыянальны парк Белавежская пушча (Belarusian); Nacyjanalny park Biełaviežskaja pušča (Belarusian)
- IUCN category II (national park)
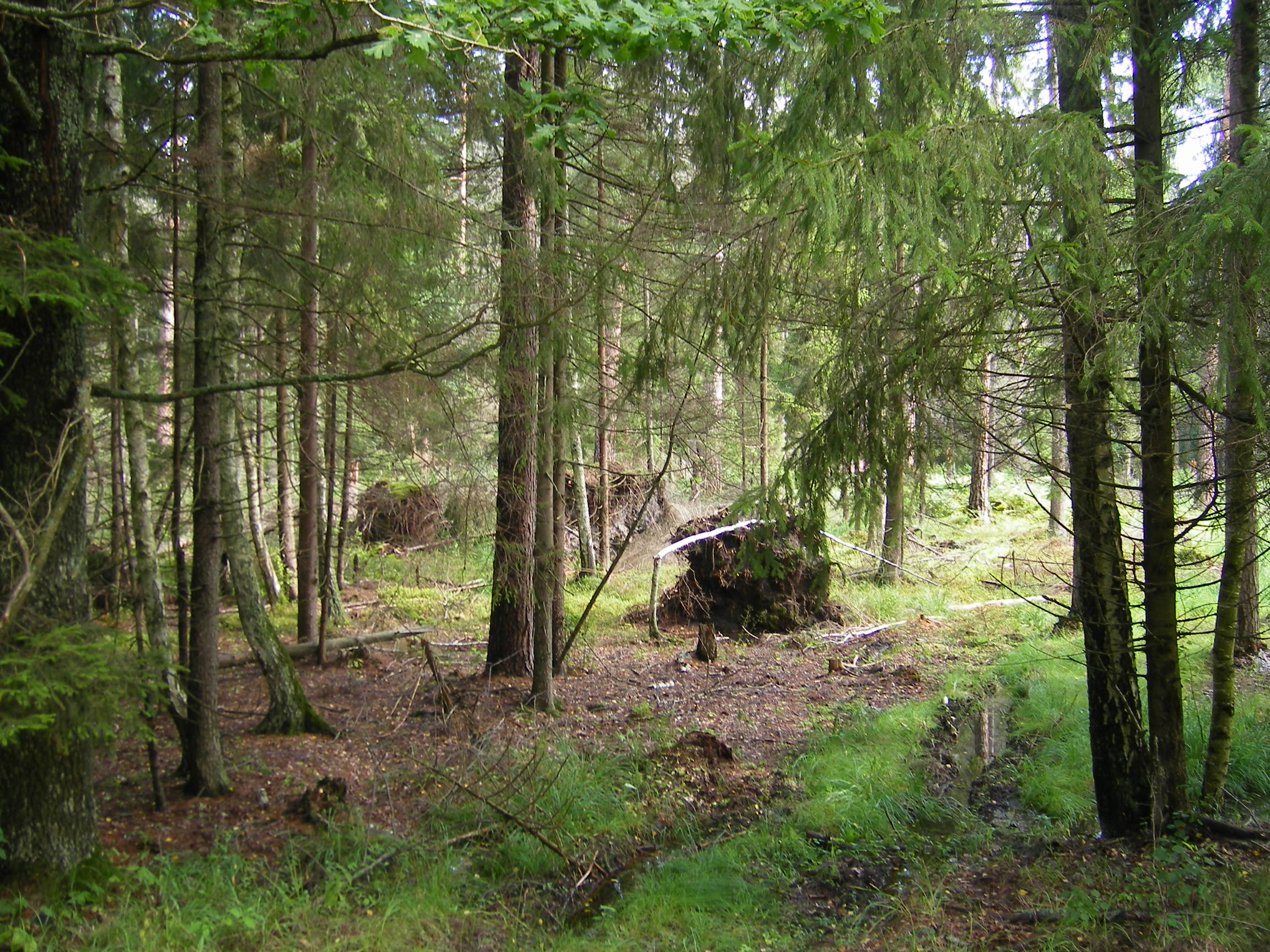
- Part of the forest at Pierarova, Brest Region

- Location within Belarus
- Location: Brest Region and Grodno Region in Belarus
- Coordinates: 52°35′7.66″N 23°52′44.86″E
- Area: 1,500.69 km^{2} (579.42 sq mi) (2015)
- Established: 11 August 1932
- Governing body: Ministry of the Environment

UNESCO World Heritage Site
- Part of: Białowieża Forest (since 1992)
- Criteria: Natural: ix, x
- Reference: 33-001
- Extensions: 2014

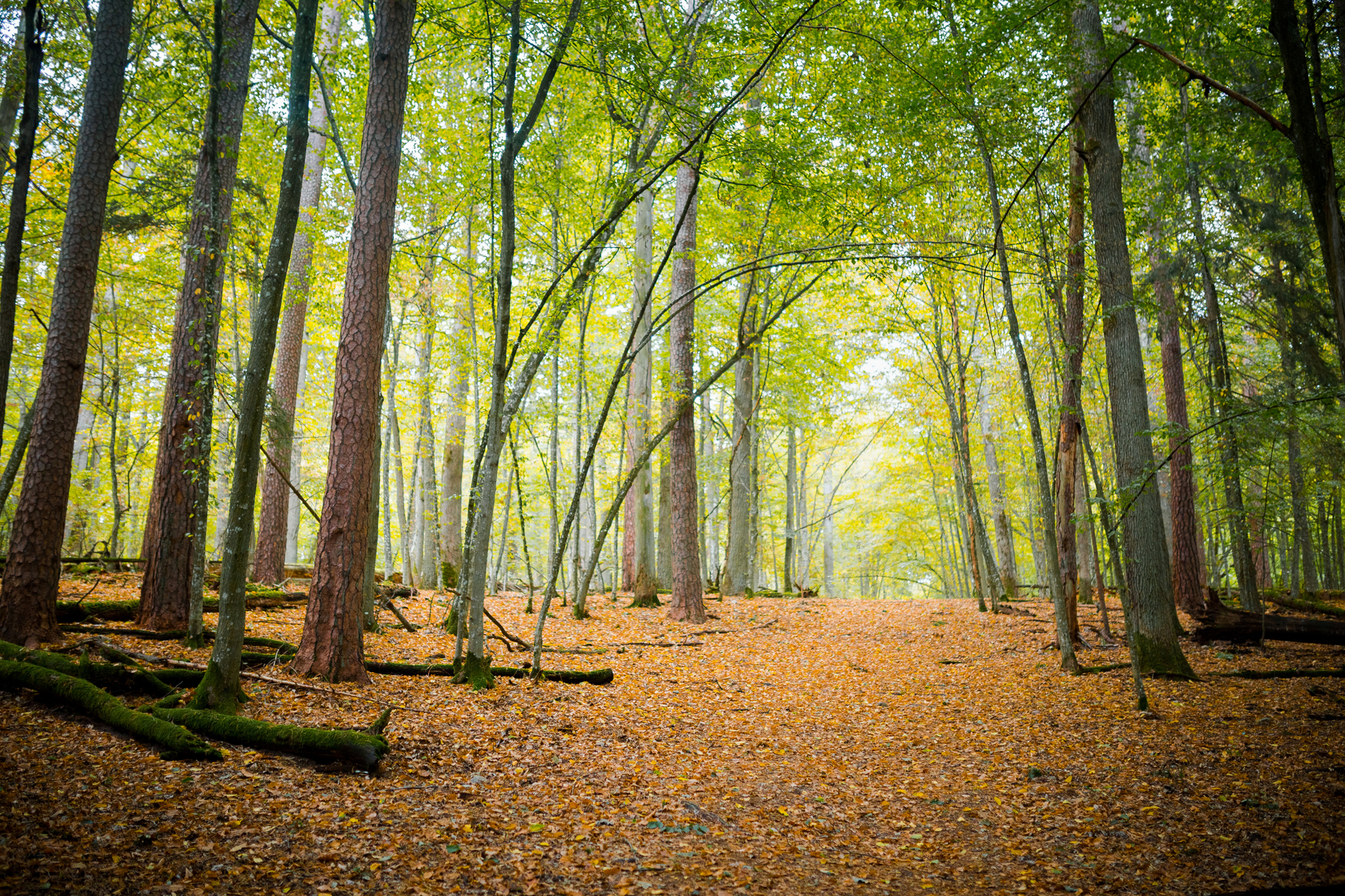

Belovezhskaya Pushcha National Park (Russian: Национальный парк «Беловежская пуща», Belarusian: Нацыянальны парк Белавежская пушча) is a national park within parts of the Brest Region (Kamyanyets District and Pruzhany District) and Grodno Region (Svislach District) in Belarus adjacent to the Polish border. Since 1992, it has been a preserved part of the UNESCO World Heritage Site Białowieża Forest, the last primeval forest fragment of the European woodlands that once stretched across the European Plain.

== Geography ==
The Belovezhskaya Pushcha Biosphere Reserve spans an area of 216,200 ha (2,162 km^{2}; 835 sq mi) (2015), subdivided into transition, buffer, and core zones. The national park occupies 150,069 ha (1,500.69 km^{2}; 579.42 sq mi) (2015). It is located 70 km (43 mi) north of Brest. The nature reserves and the national parks cover 2.7% of the Brest Region territory and 2.6% of the Grodno Region.

=== Wildlife ===
The park is home to a large population of European bison, the continent's heaviest land animals. It has been designated an Important Bird Area (IBA) by BirdLife International because it supports significant populations of black and white storks, Eurasian eagle-owls, European honey-buzzards, and lesser spotted and greater spotted eagles.

== History ==
Most of the Białowieża Forest was declared a national park on August 11, 1932 during the Second Polish Republic. After World War II the forest was divided in accordance with the Polish–Soviet border agreement of August 1945 between the People's Republic of Poland and the Byelorussian SSR of the Soviet Union. Poland reopened the Białowieża National Park in 1947. In 1957, the Belarusian part received a new status – “The State Reserve-Hunting Farm” (Russian: Государственное заповедно-охотничье хозяйство), intended for recreation of the top leaders of the Soviet state and their guests from friendly countries.

In 1991, the forest acquired its current status as a state national park. In 2009 the Belovezhskaya Pushcha National Park celebrated the 600th anniversary of its reserve status.

== Access ==
The park's headquarters are in Kamieniuki. All of the hotels and cafes were rebuilt and new ones were added to the park. The Eco Education Center, which houses the Museum of Nature, was built. Approximately 300,000 people visit the park annually.

The border between the two countries runs through the forest with the Białowieża National Park on the Polish side of the border. Since May 2015 there has been a visa-free regime within the forest for hikers and cyclists at the Pierarova-Białowieża border crossing.
