= Topiło =

- Village
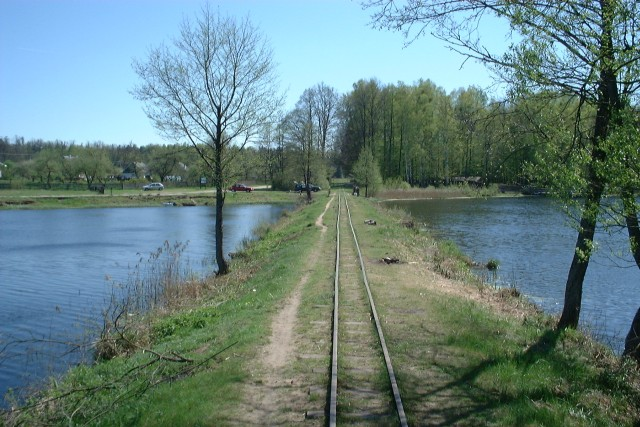
- Dam on the Topiło Lake, with narrow gauge railway

- Location within Poland
- Coordinates: 52°38′19″N 23°37′21″E
- Country: Poland
- Voivodeship: Podlaskie
- County: Hajnówka
- Gmina: Hajnówka
- Population: 100

Topiło [tɔˈpiwɔ] is a village in the administrative district of Gmina Hajnówka, within Hajnówka County, Podlaskie Voivodeship, in north-eastern Poland, close to the border with Belarus. Near Topiło flows river Leśna Prawa.
