= Verkhobuzh =

Village in Lviv Oblast, Ukraine

Verkhobuzh Верхобуж
- Village
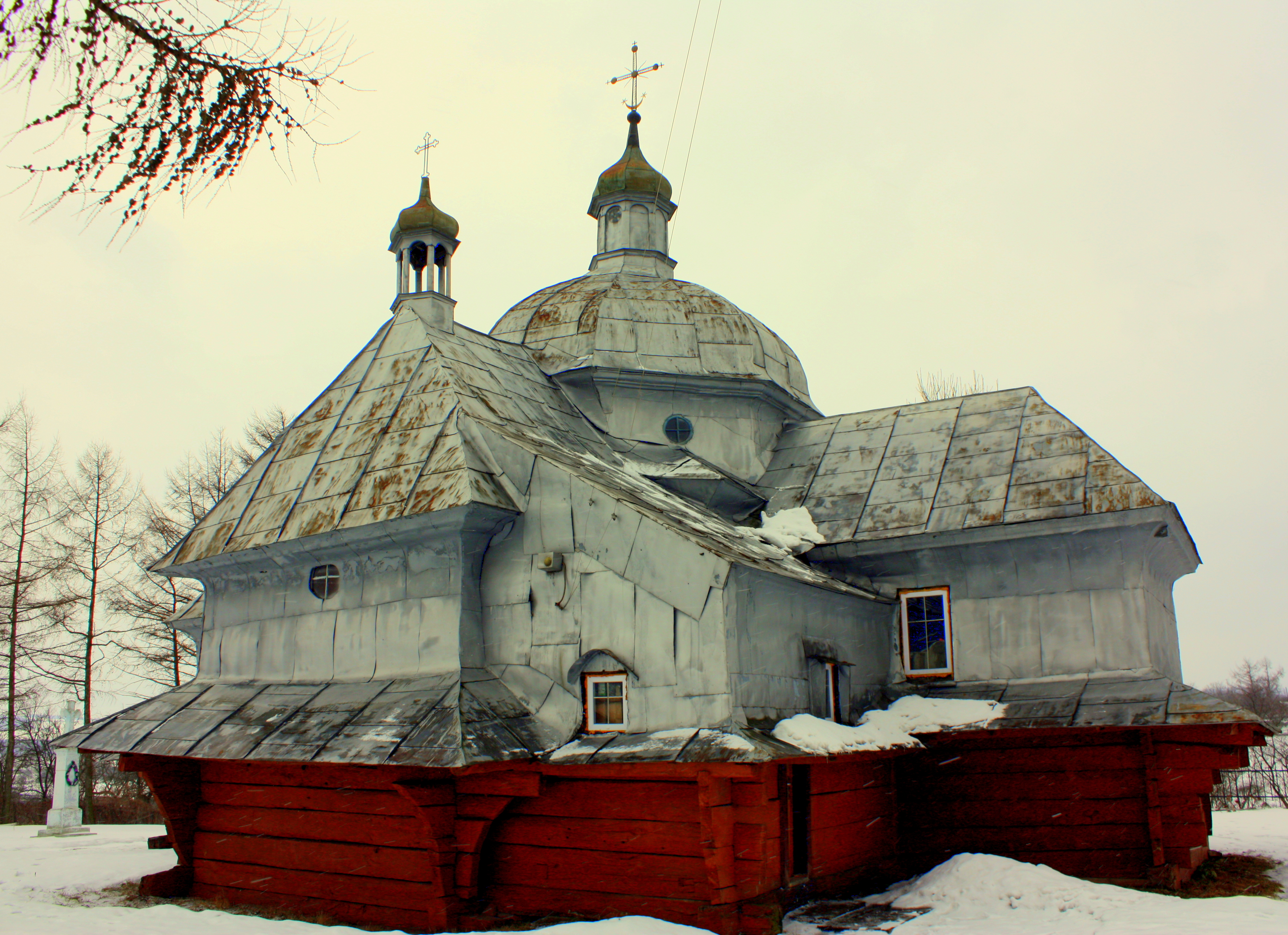
- Assumption Church

- Location within Lviv Oblast Location within Ukraine
- Coordinates: 49.8656°N 25.0969°E
- Country: Ukraine
- Oblast: Lviv Oblast
- Raion: Zolochiv Raion

Verkhobuzh (Ukrainian: Верхобуж) is a village in Zolochiv Raion, Lviv Oblast, western Ukraine.

The source of the Bug River is located in Verkhobuzh.

== See also ==
- List of villages in Lviv Oblast
