= Lesnaya =

Lesnaya may refer to:

== Places ==
- Lesnaya (Saint Petersburg Metro), a station of the St. Petersburg Metro, St. Petersburg, Russia
- Lesnaya, Vladimir Oblast, village in Russia
- Russian name for Belarusian places named Lyasnaya

== Other ==
- Vladyslava Lesnaya (born 1996), Ukrainian badminton player
- 3482 Lesnaya, a minor planet
