= Leśna Prawa =

River in Belarus

Leśna Prawa Правая Лясная
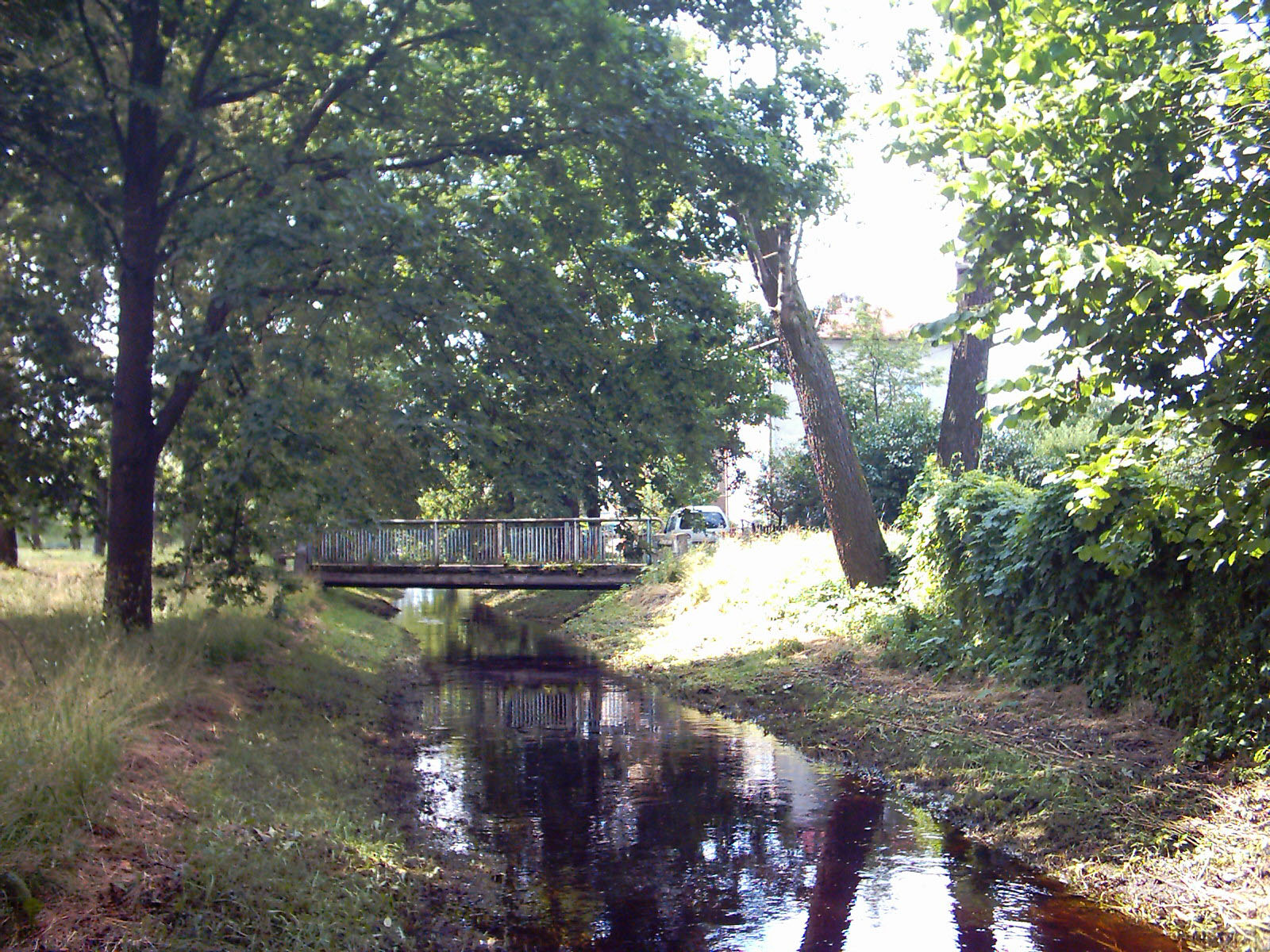
- Leśna Prawa in Hajnówka

Location
- Country: Poland, Belarus

Physical characteristics
- Source
  - location: Dubiny
- Mouth
  - location: Lyasnaya near Kamyanyets
  - coordinates: 52.4400°N 23.9087°E
- Length: 63 km (39 mi)
- Basin size: 996 km^{2} (385 sq mi)

Basin features
- Progression: Lyasnaya→ Bug→ Narew→ Vistula→ Baltic Sea

The Leśna Prawa or Pravaya Lyasnaya (Belarusian: Правая Лясная) is a river in northeastern Poland and western Belarus. At its confluence with the Lyevaya Lyasnaya near Kamyanyets, the Lyasnaya is formed. The Lyasnaya is a right tributary of the Bug River northwest of Brest.

The Leśna Prawa flows through the geographical region of Europe known as the Wysoczyzny Podlasko – Bialoruskie (English: Podlasie and Belarus Plateau) located within the Podlaskie Voivodeship of Poland and the Hrodna Voblast of Belarus. A major part of the river flows through Puszcza Białowieska. It flows through Hajnówka, Topiło, Kamyanyets. Tributaries of Leśna Prawa include Łuch, Chwiszczej, Perebel, Przewłoka, Miedna.

== Course ==
The Leśna Prawa rises in the Polish part of the Białowieża Forest and flows eastwards for roughly 33 km in Poland before continuing for about 30 km in Belarus. Within Belarus, the river forms a sinuous kayaking route that begins at Kamyanyuki and passes through Paszuki and Czernaki, then receives its left tributary Leśna Lewa near Szyszowo. It continues past Nowickowicze, Kamieniec and Małe Muriny, then on to Siulki, Baranki, Młyny, Pokry and Czarnawczyce, before reaching Tuchenicze and discharging into the Bug River at Brest. The channel alternates between muddy stretches and shallow, stony fords, with widths of 0.5–6 m and depths of 0.5–1.5 m throughout most of its course.

Along its course the river passes through extensive floodplain woods that host a rich assemblage of birdlife, including Eurasian sparrowhawk (Accipiter nisus), red-backed shrike (Lanius collurio), marsh warbler (Acrocephalus palustris) and large winter congregations of geese, ducks and mute swans. Cultural landmarks line the banks, among them a wooden Orthodox church of St Alexander Nevsky at Szyszowo, the 19th-century manor complex at Nowickowicze|pl, the 1913 Romanov commemorative tower at Kamieniec and several historic roadside chapels and mills.

== Water quality and ecosystem services ==
The Leśna Prawa River flows for roughly 33 km in Poland and a further 30 km in Belarus as a right-bank tributary of the Bug River through the Białowieża Forest. Its shallow, narrow channel—typically 0.5–1.5 m deep and 0.5–6 m wide—and limited discharge (around 0.5 cubic metres per second) are subject to inputs of treated municipal wastewater and agricultural runoff. These factors inhibit mixing and have led to persistently low water quality.

Analyses of water samples from six sites in 2012 showed elevated concentrations of biogenic compounds—ammonia nitrogen, nitrate nitrogen and total phosphorus—and depleted levels of dissolved oxygen. Under the EU Water Framework Directive, such physicochemical parameters fall below the threshold for good ecological status, preventing the river from serving as a source of drinking water abstraction or supporting healthy fish populations. Moreover, unpleasant odour and reduced clarity have diminished its aesthetic and recreational appeal, despite the presence of regional cycling and walking routes and a narrow-gauge railway that runs along its valley.

== See also ==
- Dąb Car
