= Kamyanyuki =

Agrotown in Brest Region, Belarus

Kamyanyuki Камянюкі (Belarusian)
- Agrotown
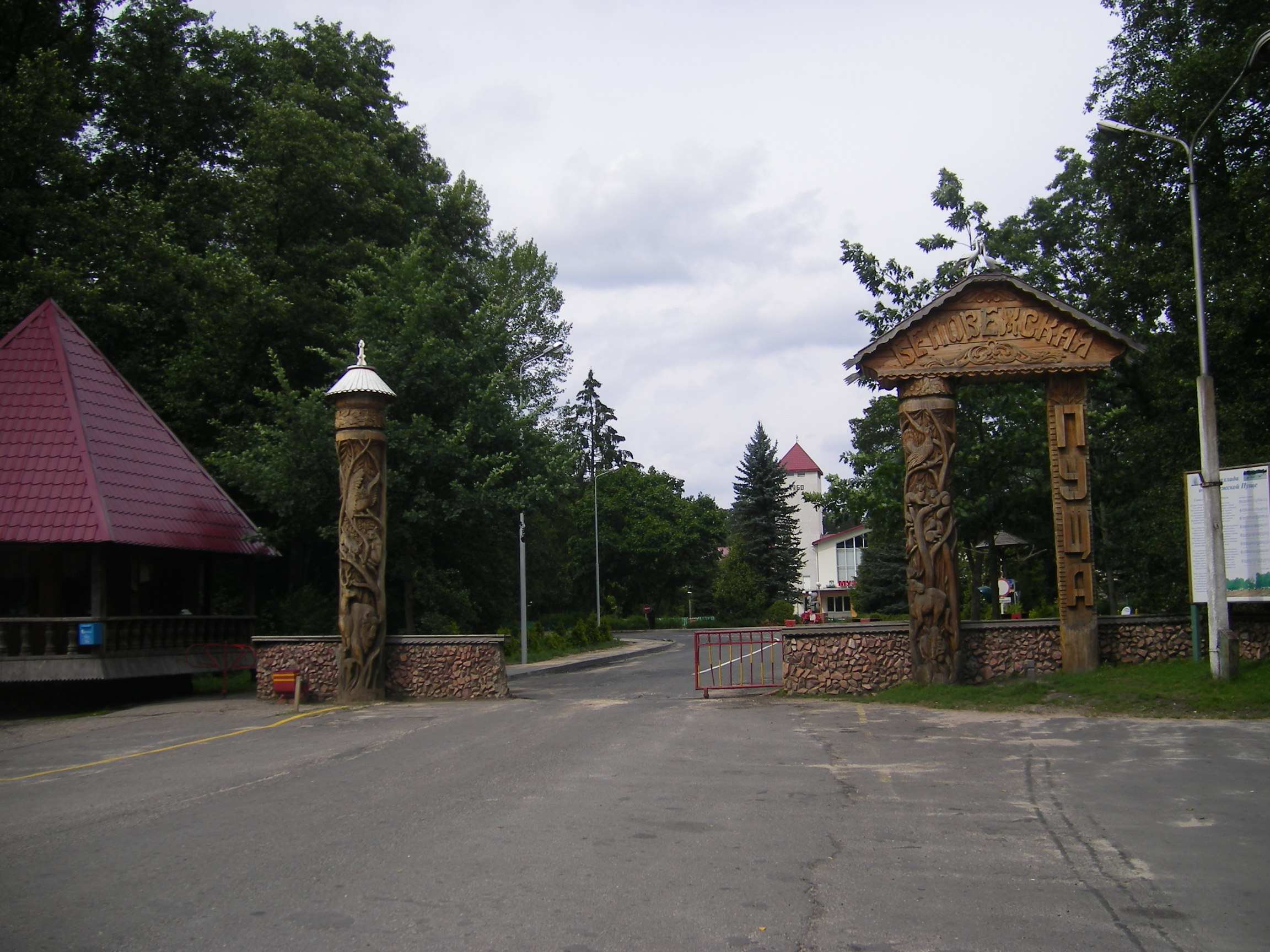
- Entry of the Nature Museum and ZOO in Kamyanyuki

- Location within Belarus
- Coordinates: 52°33′39″N 23°47′57″E
- Country: Belarus
- Region: Brest Region
- District: Kamyenyets District
- Population (2009): 1,119
- Time zone: UTC+3
- Area code: +375 1631

Kamyanyuki (Belarusian: Камянюкі, romanized: Kamianiuki), also known as Kamyenyuki (Каменюкі / Kamieniuki), is an agrotown in Kamyenyets District, Brest Region, Belarus. It serves as the administrative center of Kamyanyuki selsoviet.

It is located in Belovezhskaya Pushcha National Park (the Belarusian part of the Białowieża Forest), 21 kilometres (13 mi) north from Kamyenyets, 60 kilometres (37 mi) from Brest and 47 kilometres (29 mi) from the Zhabinka railway station, on the Leśna Prawa river.

== History ==
From 1921 to 1939, it belonged to the Gmina Białowieża. According to the 1921 Polish census, 138 people lived in the village, all of them Orthodox. At the same time, 13 residents declared Polish nationality, 108 declared Belarusian nationality, and 17 declared other nationalities. There were 22 residential buildings in the village.

== Attractions ==
There is a Belarusian residence of Ded Moroz near Kamyanyuki. The total area of Ded Moroz's "property" (Touristic object "Residence of Belarusian Ded Moroz") is 15 hectares. Besides the manor of Ded Moros, it includes the house of Snegurochka, museum of Ded Moroz, "Treasury", as well as objects related to various fairy tales.

There is a wooden Russian Orthodox Church of St. George, inaugurated in 2009.
