= Lyevaya Lyasnaya =

Location
- Country: Belarus

Physical characteristics
- Source
  - location: Mylnisk
- Mouth
  - location: Lyasnaya near Kamyanyets
  - coordinates: 52.4400°N 23.9087°E
- Length: 50 km (31 mi)
- Basin size: 750 km^{2} (290 sq mi)

Basin features
- Progression: Lyasnaya→ Bug→ Narew→ Vistula→ Baltic Sea

The Lyevaya Lyasnaya (Belarusian: Левая Лясная) is a river in western Belarus. At its confluence with the Pravaya Lyasnaya near Kamyanyets, the Lyasnaya is formed. The Lyasnaya is a right-bank tributary of the Bug River northwest of Brest. The average discharge at the mouth of 3.6 m^{3}. The average slope of water surface 0.5 ‰.

The Lyevaya Lyasnaya flows through Pruzhany Raion and Kamenets Raion areas of Brest Voblast of Belarus.

The river flows through: Mylnisk, Kamyanyets, Vuglyany.

Tributaries: Leśna Prawa, Wishnia.

== See also ==
- Leśna Prawa
