= Lesnoy (surname) =

Lesnoy or Lesnoi (Russian: Лесной, "Forest" (adjective)) is a Russian masculine surname. Its feminine counterpart is Lesnaya.

It may refer to:

- Aleksandr Lesnoy (born 1988), Russian shot putter
- Sergey Paramonov (entomologist) (1894–1967), Ukrainian-Australian entomologist who used the pseudonym Sergey Lesnoy
- Vladyslava Lesnaya (born 1996), Ukrainian badminton player
