= Lyasny =

Lyasny (Belarusian: Лясны, romanized: Liasny) or Lesnoy (Russian: Лесной) may refer to the following places in Belarus:

- Lyasny, Minsk Region
- Lyasny (Brest District)
- Lyasny (Stolin District)
- Lyasny (Orsha District)

== See also ==
- Lyasnaya
