= Pyerarova =

Pyerarova Перарова (Belarusian)
- Khutor
- Location within Belarus
- Coordinates: 52°38′44″N 23°55′38″E
- Country: Belarus
- Region: Brest Region
- District: Pruzhany District
- Population (2010): 29
- Time zone: UTC+3 (MSK)

Pyerarova (Belarusian: Перарова, romanized: Pierarova; Russian: Перерово, romanized: Pererovo) is a rural locality (a khutor) in Pruzhany District, Brest Region, Belarus. It is part of Sharashova selsoviet.

== History ==
During the period of the Russian Empire, Pyerarova was part of Belovezhskaya-Alexandrovskaya Volost of Pruzhansky Uyezd of Grodno Governorate. At the beginning of the 20th century, the settlement included 15 inhabitants. From 1921 to 1939, it was a part of Poland. In September 1939, following the Soviet invasion of Poland, the village and surrounding territories were incorporated into the Byelorussian Soviet Socialist Republic, from January 15, 1940, in Sharashovsky, from December 17, 1956, in the Pruzhany District of the Brest Region.

In 1970, the settlement had 16 inhabitants. By 1999, the number increased to 34. In 2005, it consisted of 6 inhabitants and 2 yards. In 2010, it had 29 inhabitants. On May 29, 2015, the Sharashevsky village council, which included the farm, was transformed into a village council.
