= Lyasnaya =

Lyasnaya may refer to:

- Lyasnaya, Brest Region, agrotown in Belarus
- Lyasnaya, Mogilev Region, agrotown in Belarus
- Lyasnaya River, Belarus, right tributary of Western Bug
- Lyevaya Lyasnaya ("left Lyasnaya") river, Belarus
- Pravaya Lyasnaya ("right Lyasnaya") river, Belarus

== See also ==
- Lyasny
- Lesnaya (disambiguation)
