= Rebecca Frankel =

American author

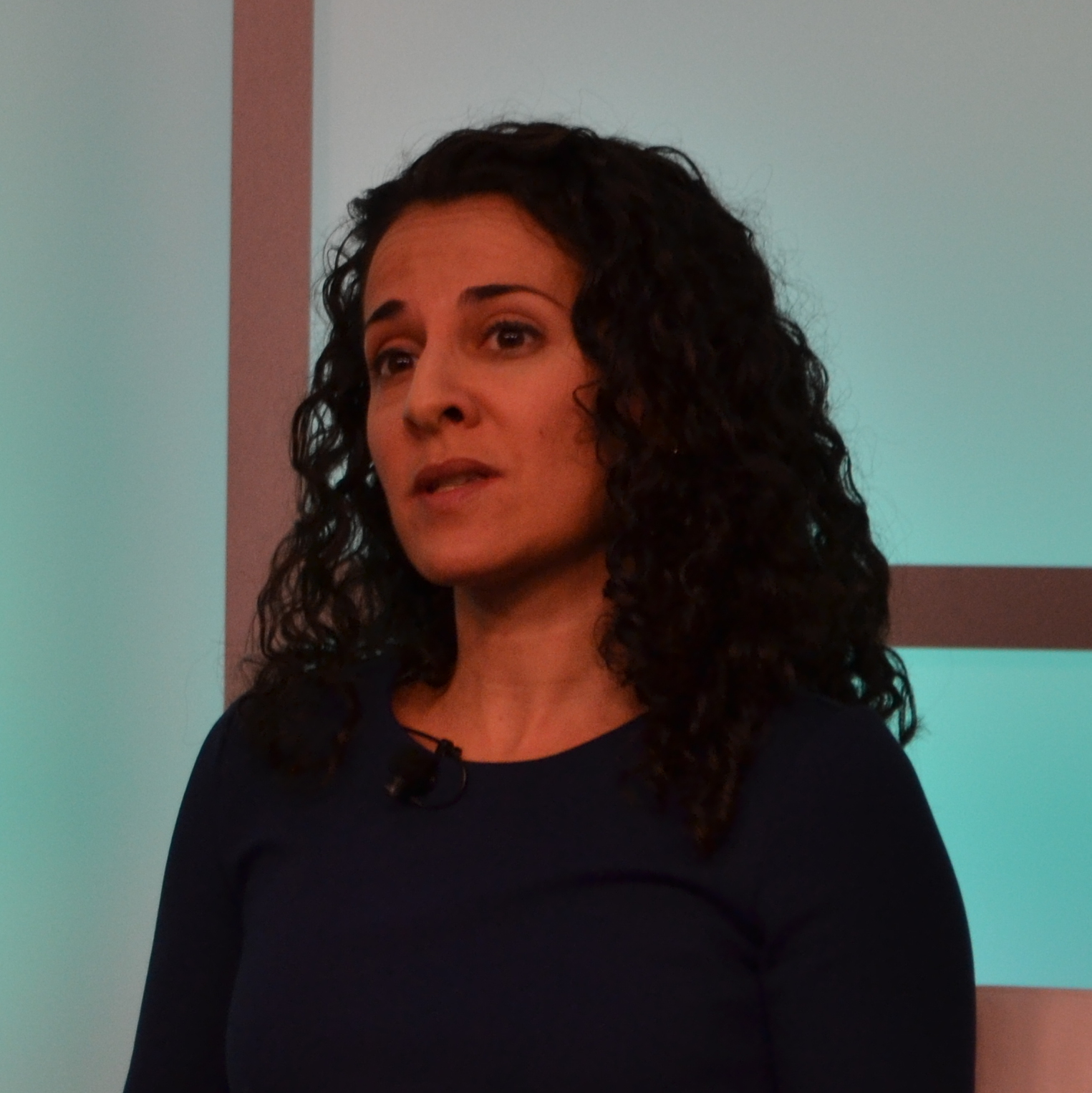
Frankel at an event for War Dogs, 2014

Rebecca Frankel is an American author. She is the former executive editor of Foreign Policy.

== Books ==
- Into the Forest: A Holocaust Story of Survival, Triumph, and Love (St. Martin's Press, 2021)
- War Dogs: Tales of Canine Heroism, History, and Love (St. Martin's Press, 2014)
