= Lesnaya, Vladimir Oblast =

Lesnaya Лесная
- Village
- Location within Vladimir Oblast Location within Russia
- Coordinates: 55°43′N 40°33′E
- Country: Russia
- Region: Vladimir Oblast
- District: Gus-Khrustalny District
- Time zone: UTC+3:00

Lesnaya (Russian: Лесная) is a rural locality (a village) in Posyolok Anopino, Gus-Khrustalny District, Vladimir Oblast, Russia. The population was 15 as of 2010.

== Geography ==
Lesnaya is located 18 km north of Gus-Khrustalny (the district's administrative centre) by road. Panfilovo is the nearest rural locality.
