= Bug (river) =

Major Central European river

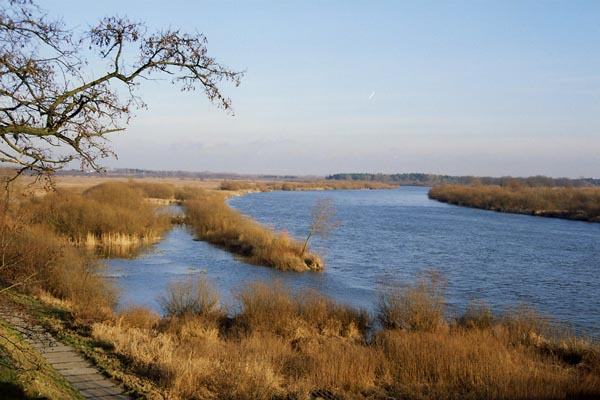
- Bug River in the vicinity of Wyszków, Poland

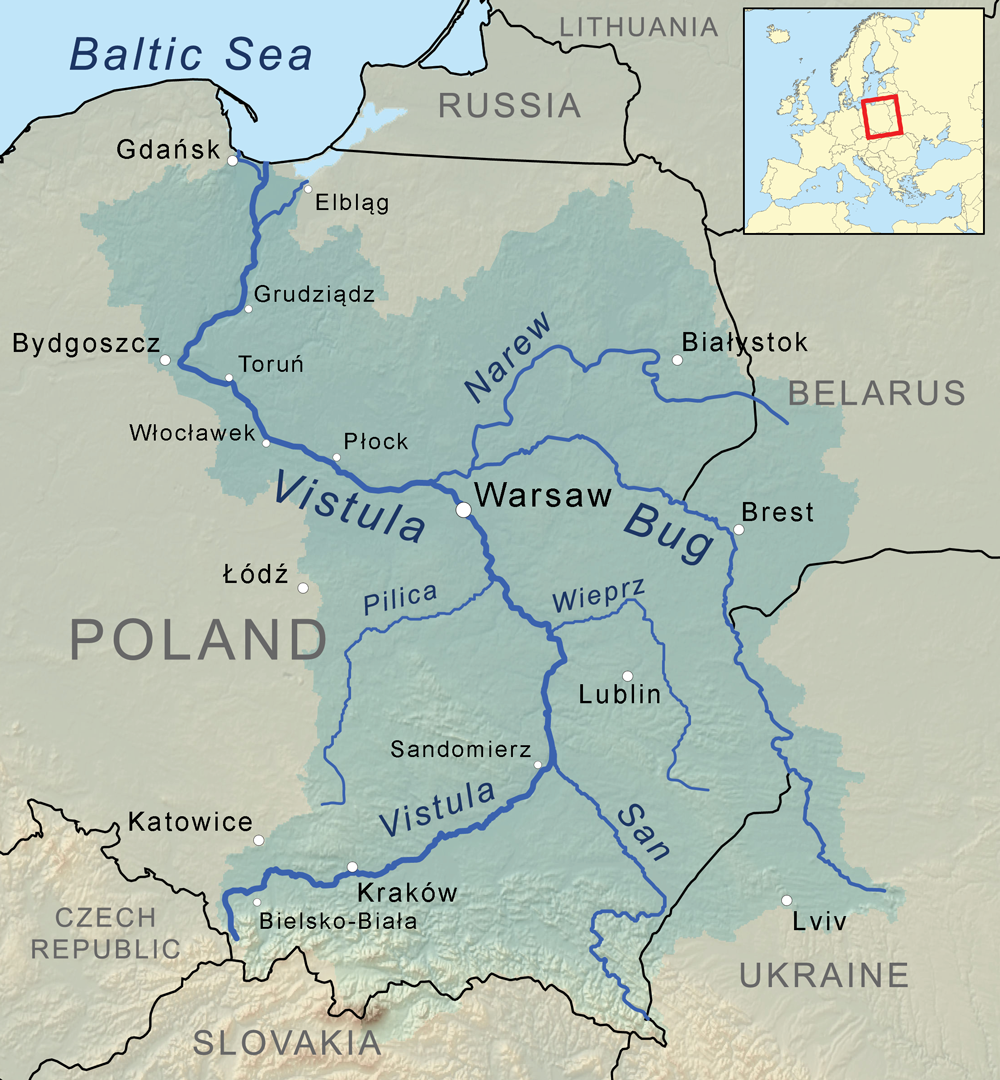
- Bug River
- Native name: Bug (Polish); Західний Буг (Ukrainian); Заходні Буг (Belarusian); Западный Буг (Russian)

Location
- Country: Poland, Belarus, Ukraine
- Voivodeship Region Oblast: Podlaskie, Mazovian, Lublin, Brest, Lviv
- Cities: Sheptytskyi, Sokal, Włodawa, Brest, Drohiczyn, Wyszków, Serock

Physical characteristics
- Source
  - location: near Verkhobuzh, Lviv Oblast, Ukraine
  - coordinates: 49.8715°N 25.0960°E
  - elevation: 310 m (1,020 ft)
- Mouth: Narew
  - location: near Serock, Poland
  - coordinates: 52.50814°N 21.08408°E
  - elevation: 75 m (246 ft)
- Length: 774 km (481 mi)
- Basin size: 38,712 km^{2} (14,947 sq mi)
- Discharge
  - location: Serock
  - average: 1 m^{3}/s (35 cu ft/s)
- Discharge
  - location: Narew
  - average: 155 m^{3}/s (5,500 cu ft/s)

Basin features
- Progression: Narew→ Vistula→ Baltic Sea

The Bug or Western Bug (Note: Polish: Bug [buk], Ukrainian: Західний Буг, Zakhidnyi Buh, Belarusian: Захо́дні Буг, Zakhodni Buh; Russian: Западный Буг, Zapadnyy Bug) is a major river in East Europe that flows through Belarus (border), Poland, and Ukraine, with a total length of 774 kilometres (481 mi). A tributary of the Narew, the Bug forms part of the border between Belarus and Poland for 178 kilometres (111 mi) and part of the border between Ukraine and Poland for 185 kilometres (115 mi).

The Bug is connected with the Dnieper by the Dnieper–Bug Canal. Out of its 38,712 square kilometres (14,947 mi^{2}) drainage basin, half is in Poland, just over a quarter in Belarus, and slightly under a quarter in Ukraine.

== History ==
According to Zbigniew Gołąb, the Slavic hydronym Bug as *bugъ/*buga derives from the Proto-Indo-European verbal root *bheug- (with cognates in old Proto-Germanic *bheugh- etc. with the meaning 'bend, turn, move away'), with the hypothetical original meaning 'pertaining to a (river) bend', and derivatives in Russian búga 'low banks of a river overgrown with bushes', Polish bugaj 'bushes or woods in a river valley or on a steep river bank', and Latvian bauga 'marshy place by a river'.

Traditionally (e.g., by the drafters of the Curzon Line), the Bug River has been considered the ethnographic border between the East and West as well as the border between Orthodox (Ukrainians, Belarusians) and Catholic (Poles) peoples, with Podlachia being a historical borderland where ethnic elements of those nations intermerged.

The Bug was part of the frontier between the territories occupied by Austria, Russia, and Prussia after the Third Partition of Poland in 1795, the southern half of the eastern border of the Duchy of Warsaw and Lithuanian Provisional Governing Commission (1809–1815), Congress Poland and Russia proper (1815–1867), of the Vistula Land and Russia proper (1867–1913), and of the Regency Kingdom of Poland and BPR (1917–1918). The Bug also formed part of the dividing line between German Wehrmacht and Soviet Red Army zones specified in a clause of the German–Soviet Frontier Treaty of 28 September 1939 following the September 1939 invasion of Poland in the Second World War.

== Geographic characteristics ==
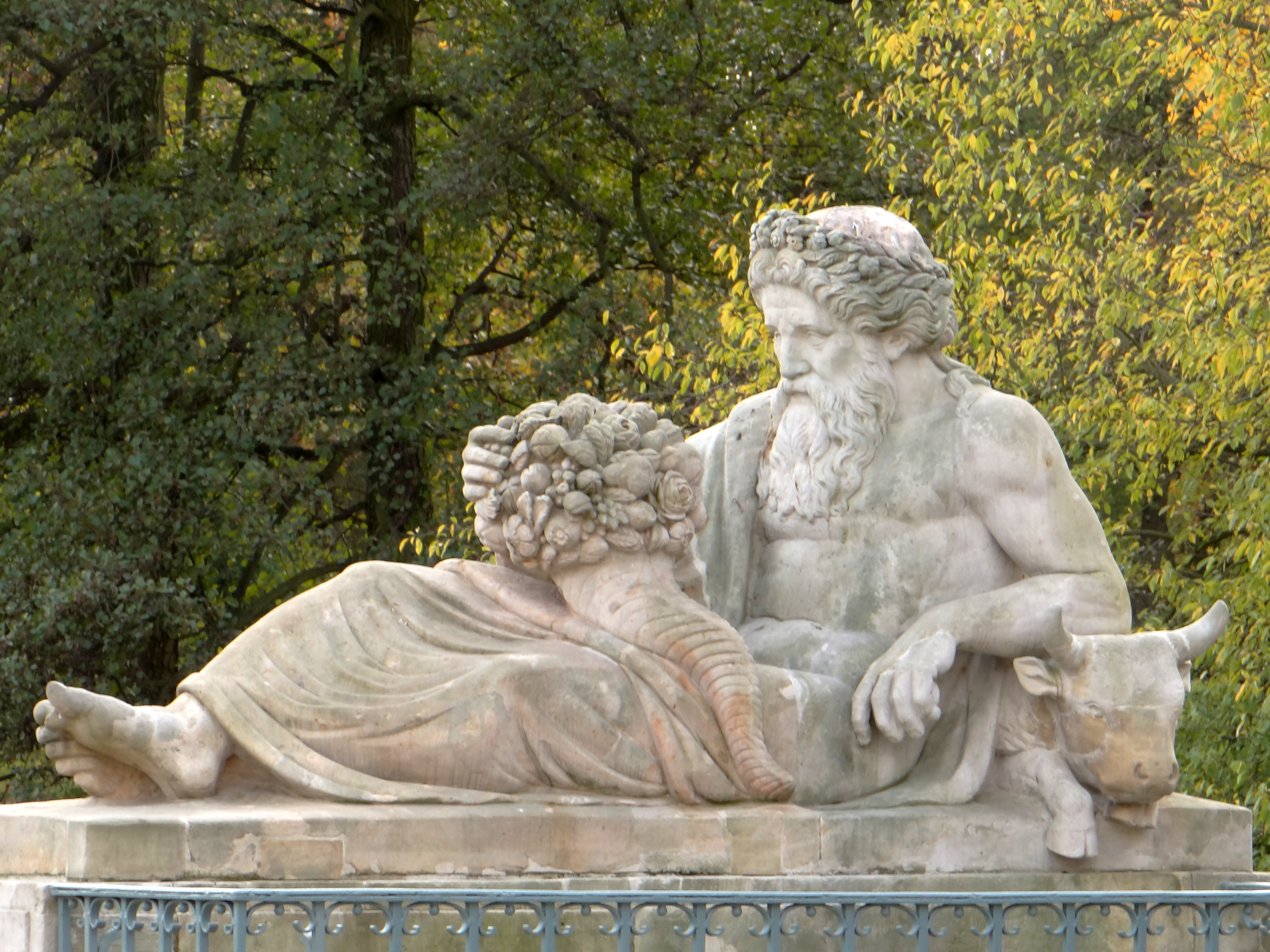
Allegory of the Bug River, a statue on the terrace of the Łazienki Palace in Royal Baths Park, Warsaw, Poland

The Bug is a left tributary of the Narew. It flows from the Lviv Oblast in the west of Ukraine northwards into the Volyn Oblast, before passing along the Ukraine-Polish and Polish-Belarusian border and into Poland, where it follows part of the border between the Masovian and Podlaskie Voivodeships. It joins the Narew at Serock, a few kilometers upstream of the artificial Zegrze Lake, which was constructed in 1963 with a hydroelectric complex.

This part of the Narew between the confluence and the Vistula is sometimes referred to as Bugo-Narew but on December 27, 1962, the Prime Minister of Poland's act abolished the name "Bugo-Narew", soon after Zegrze Lake was completed.

On the Bug, a few kilometers from the Vysokaye in Kamenets District of the Brest Region, is the westernmost point of Belarus. It is also connected with the Dnieper via the Mukhavets, a right-bank tributary, by the Dnieper-Bug Canal.

== Basin ==
The total basin area of the Bug is 38,712 square kilometres (14,947 mi^{2}) of which half, 19,239 square kilometres (7,428 mi^{2}) or, 50%, is in Poland. Somewhat more than a quarter, 11,400 square kilometres (4,400 mi^{2}) or 29%, is in Belarus, and a bit under a quarter, 8,700 square kilometres (3,400 mi^{2}) or 22% lies in Ukraine.

The climate of the Bug basin is temperate.

The basin experiences annual high-water levels during spring flooding due to thawing snow, after which a low flow period starts and lasts until October or mid-November. Occasional summer floods often occur in the headlands, where mountains influence favorable flash-flood conditions. In Autumn the water level increases are inconsiderable; in some years they do not happen at all. During the winter the river can have temporary ice-outs that sometimes provoke ice jams, causing an increase of the level up to 2 metres (6.6 ft). The resultant water levels are changeable due to the instability of ice cover.

== Flooding ==
Significant floods during the last 60 years in Belarus were registered in 1958, 1962, 1967, 1971 and 1974. The largest spring flood was observed in 1979, when the maximum water discharge was 19.1 cubic metres per second on 24 March 1979, at the village of Chersk; 166 cubic metres per second near the village of Tyukhinichi (Lyasnaya river) on 31 March 1979; and 269 cubic metres per second near Brest on 1 April 1979. A similar spring flood occurred in 1999 when the spring run-off in March–May exceeded the average annual value by almost half again (48%).

The last time the Bug flooded in Poland and Ukraine was in 2010 and the last time it flooded in Belarus was in 1999.

== Tributaries ==
Left bank
- Poltva
- Bukowa
- Huczwa
- Uherka
- Włodawka
- Krzna
- Toczna
- Liwiec
- Kałamanka

Right bank

- Solokiya
- Luha
- Mukhavets
- Lyasnaya
  - Leśna Prawa
  - Lyevaya Lyasnaya
- Nurzec
- Brok
- Warenzhanka

== Photo gallery ==
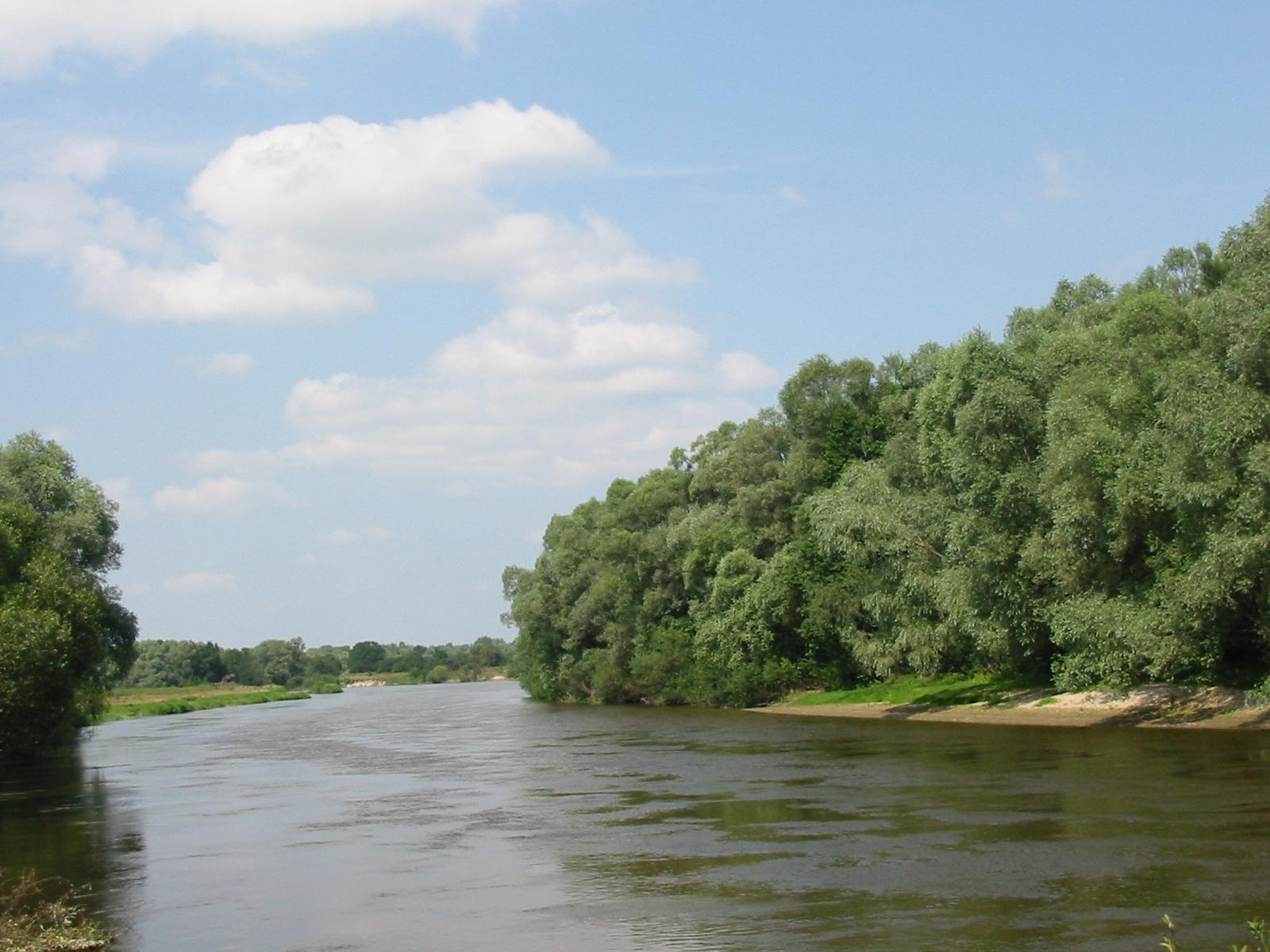
Bug River in the vicinity of Włodawa

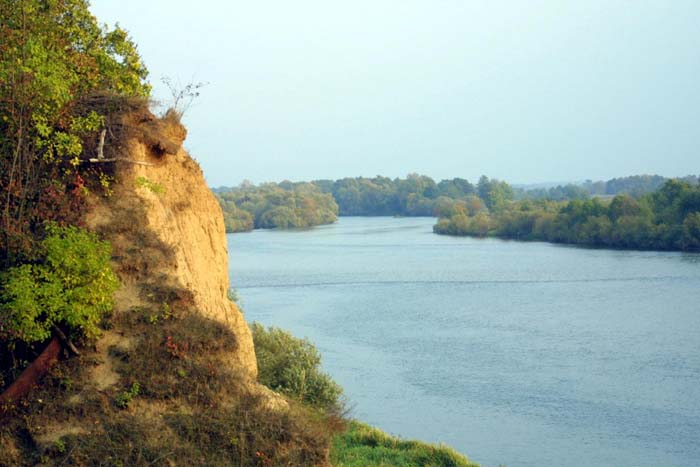
Bug River in the vicinity of Nur

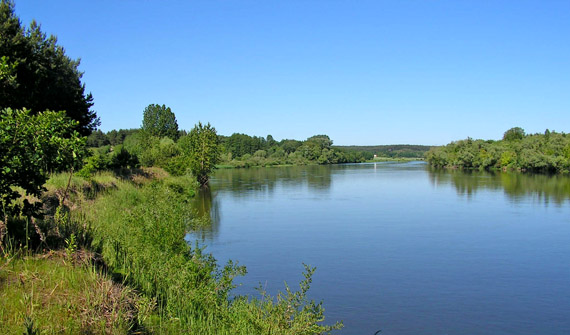
Bug River in the vicinity of Drohiczyn

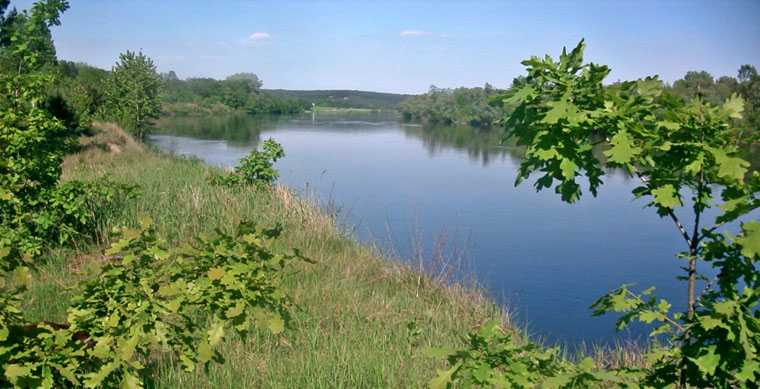
Bug River landscape near Nadbużański

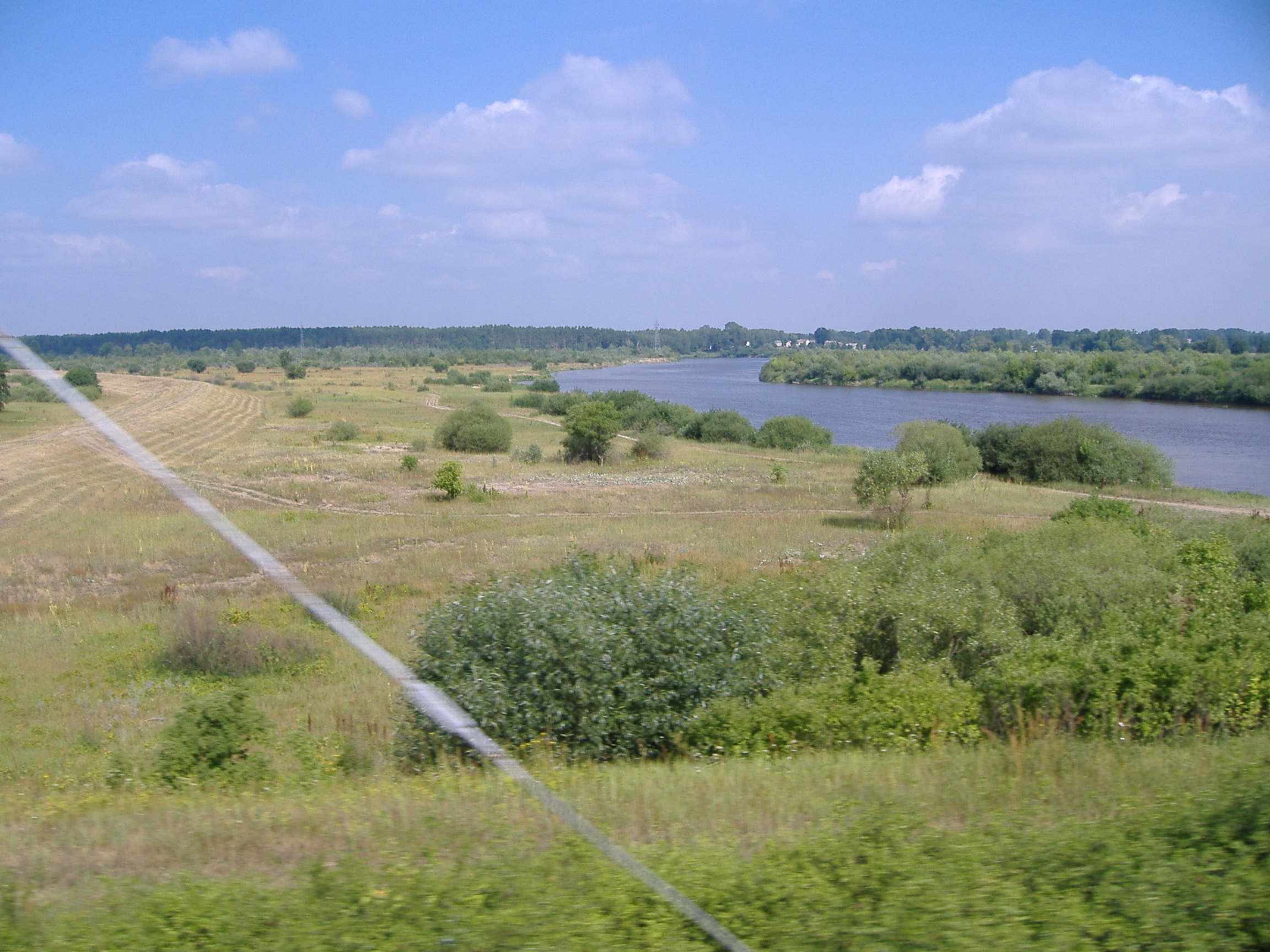
Bug River in the vicinity of Małkinia Górna

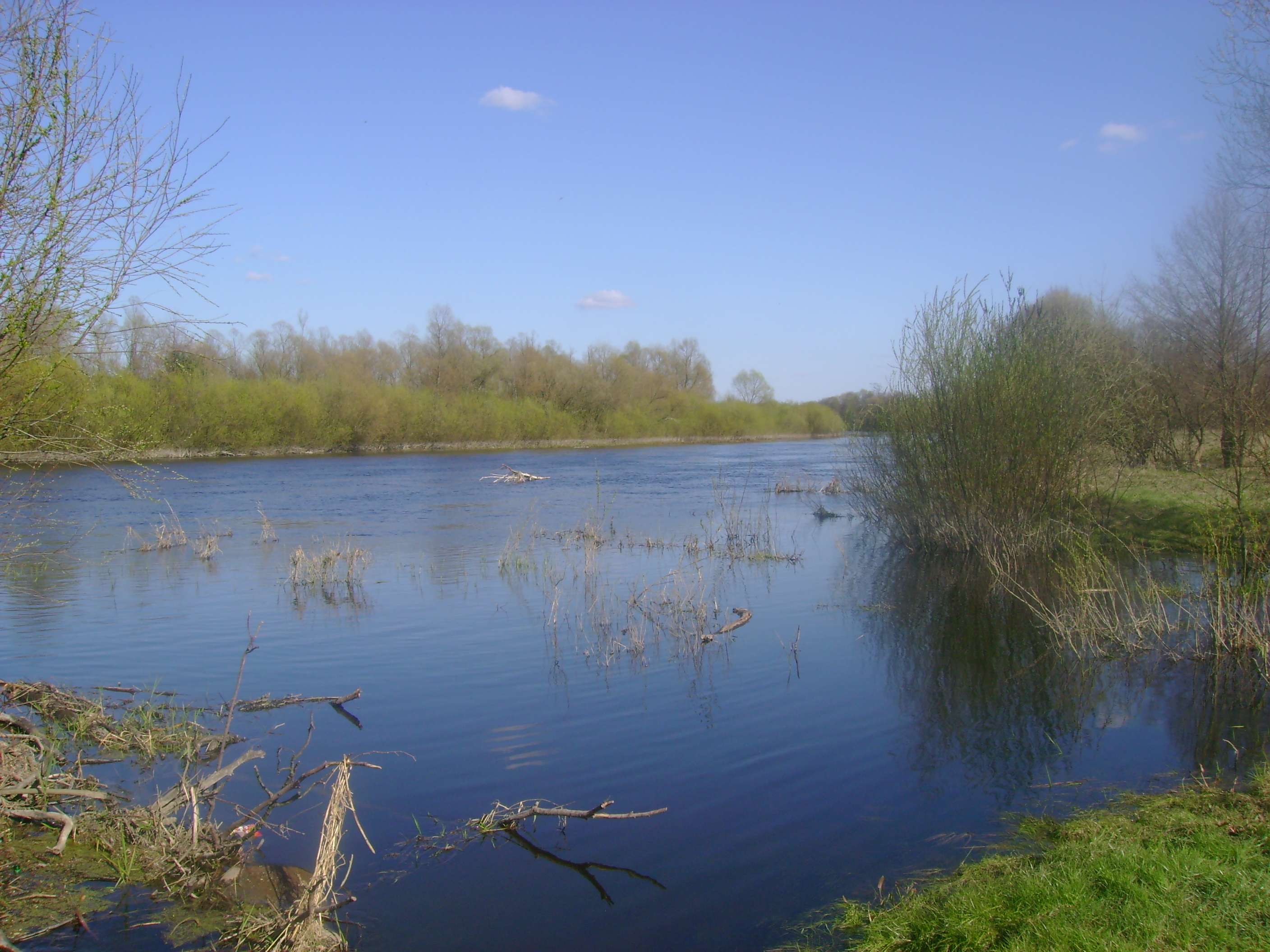
Bug River in the vicinity of Serpelice

== See also ==
- Bug Landscape Park – Protected area in Poland
- Geography of Belarus
- Geography of Poland
- Geography of Ukraine
- Rivers of Belarus
- List of rivers of Poland
- Rivers of Ukraine
- Southern Bug – River in Ukraine
