= Commonwealth of Independent States =

Eurasian intergovernmental organisation

Commonwealth of Independent States (in other state languages): Armenian: Համագործակցություն Անկախ պետություններ Hamagortsakts’ut’yun Ankakh petut’yunner; Azerbaijani: Müstəqil Dövlətlər Birliyi (MDB); Belarusian: Садружнасць Незалежных Дзяржаў (СНД) Sadružnasć Niezaliežnych Dziaržaŭ; Kazakh: Тәуелсіз Мемлекеттер Достастығы (ТМД) Täuelsız Memleketter Dostastyğy; Kyrgyz: Көз карандысыз Мамлекеттер Шериктештиги (КМШ) Köz karandısız Mamleketter Şerikteştigi; Romanian: Comunitatea Statelor Independente (CSI); Russian: Содружество Независимых Государств (СНГ) Sodruzhestvo Nezavisimykh Gosudarstv; Tajik: Иттиходи Давлатҳои Мустақил Ittixodi Davlathoi Mustaqil (ИДМ); Uzbek: Мустақил Давлатлар Ҳамдўстлиги (МДХ) Mustaqil Davlatlar Hamdoʻstligi
- Flag Emblem

- Member states Associate state
- Administrative seats: Minsk; Moscow
- Largest city: Moscow
- Working language: Russian
- Type: Intergovernmental
- Membership: 9 member states: Armenia; Azerbaijan; Belarus; Kazakhstan; Kyrgyzstan; Moldova (Note: Moldova is withdrawing from the CIS, effective 8 April 2027.); Russia; Tajikistan; Uzbekistan; 1 associate state: Turkmenistan

Leaders
  - General Secretary: Sergey Lebedev
- Legislature: Interparliamentary Assembly

Establishment
  - Belovezha Accords: 8 December 1991
  - Alma-Ata Protocol: 21 December 1991
  - Charter adopted: 22 January 1993
  - Free Trade Area: 20 September 2012

Area
  - Total: 20,368,759 km^{2} (7,864,422 sq mi)

Population
  - 2025 estimate: ▲251,764,976
  - Density: 12.36/km^{2} (32.0/sq mi)
- GDP (PPP): 2026 estimate
  - Total: ▲$10.07 trillion
  - Per capita: ▲$40,357
- GDP (nominal): 2026 estimate
  - Total: ▲$3.52 trillion
  - Per capita: ▲$14,096
- HDI (2023): 0.806 very high
- Currency: No common currency (Note: Soviet ruble (руб) used from 1991 to 1994.) Member states: Armenian dram (֏); Azerbaijani manat (₼); Belarusian ruble (Rbl); Kazakhstani tenge (₸); Kyrgyzstani som (с); Moldovan leu (L); Russian ruble (₽); Tajikistani somoni (SM); Uzbekistani soum (soʻm); Associate state: Turkmenistani manat (m)
- Time zone: UTC+2 to +12
- Internet TLD: .ru, .by, .am, .kz, .kg, .az, .md, .tj, .uz, .su
- Website eccis.org e-cis.info

The Commonwealth of Independent States (CIS) (Note: Russian: Содружество Независимых Государств, СНГ, romanised: Sodruzhestvo Nezavisimykh Gosudarstv, SNG) is a regional intergovernmental organisation of states in Eurasia. It was formed following the dissolution of the Soviet Union in 1991. It covers an area of 20,368,759 km^{2} (7,864,422 sq mi) and has an estimated population of 246,200,194. The CIS encourages cooperation in economic, political, and military affairs and has certain powers related to the coordination of trade, finance, lawmaking, and security, including the prevention of cross-border crime.

As the USSR disintegrated, Belarus, Russia, and Ukraine signed the Belovezha Accords on 8 December 1991, declaring that the Union had effectively ceased to exist and proclaiming the CIS in its place. On 21 December, these three former Soviet republics and eight additional ones signed the Alma-Ata Protocol, which established the founding declarations and principles of the CIS. Georgia joined the CIS in 1993 but withdrew its membership in 2008 following a war with Russia. Ukraine formally ended its participation in CIS statutory bodies in 2018, although it had stopped participating in the organisation following the 2014 Russian annexation of Crimea. Following Russia's 2022 invasion of Ukraine, Moldova started to withdraw from the CIS institutional framework, culminating in its denunciation of the CIS treaty, protocol, and charter on 8 April 2026.

Eight of the nine CIS member states participate in the CIS Free Trade Area. Three organisations originated from the CIS, namely the Collective Security Treaty Organization, the Eurasian Economic Union (alongside subdivisions, the Eurasian Customs Union and the Eurasian Economic Space); and the Union State. While the first and the second are military and economic alliances, the third aims to reach a supranational union of Russia and Belarus with a common government and currency.

== History and structure ==
=== Background ===
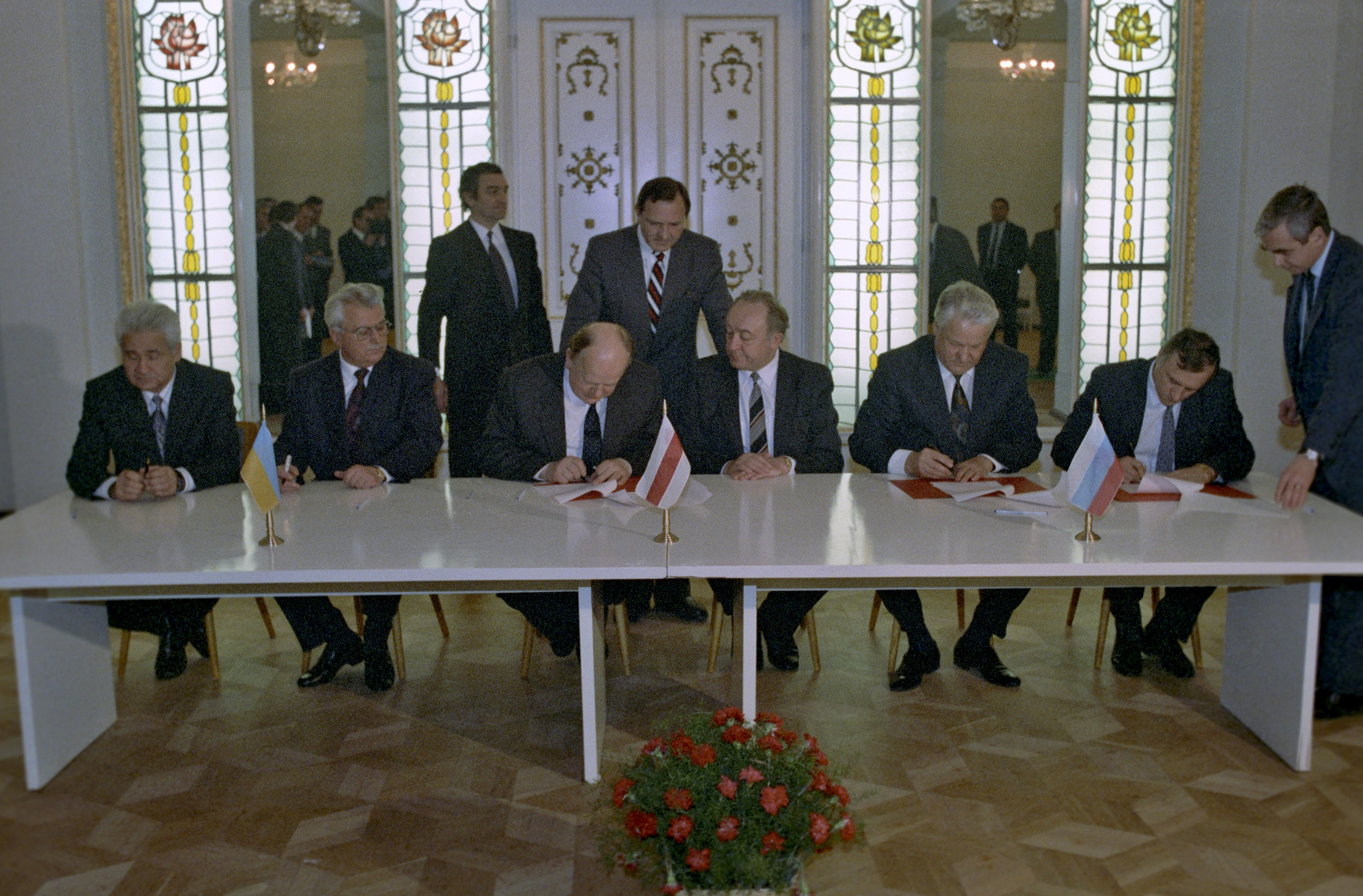
Signing of the Belovezha Accords, 8 December 1991

In March 1991, amidst Perestroika and a rising political crisis in the country, Mikhail Gorbachev, the president of the Soviet Union, proposed a federation by holding a referendum to preserve the Union as a union of sovereign republics. The new treaty signing never happened as the Communist Party hardliners staged a coup attempt in Moscow in 19 August that year.

=== Founding ===
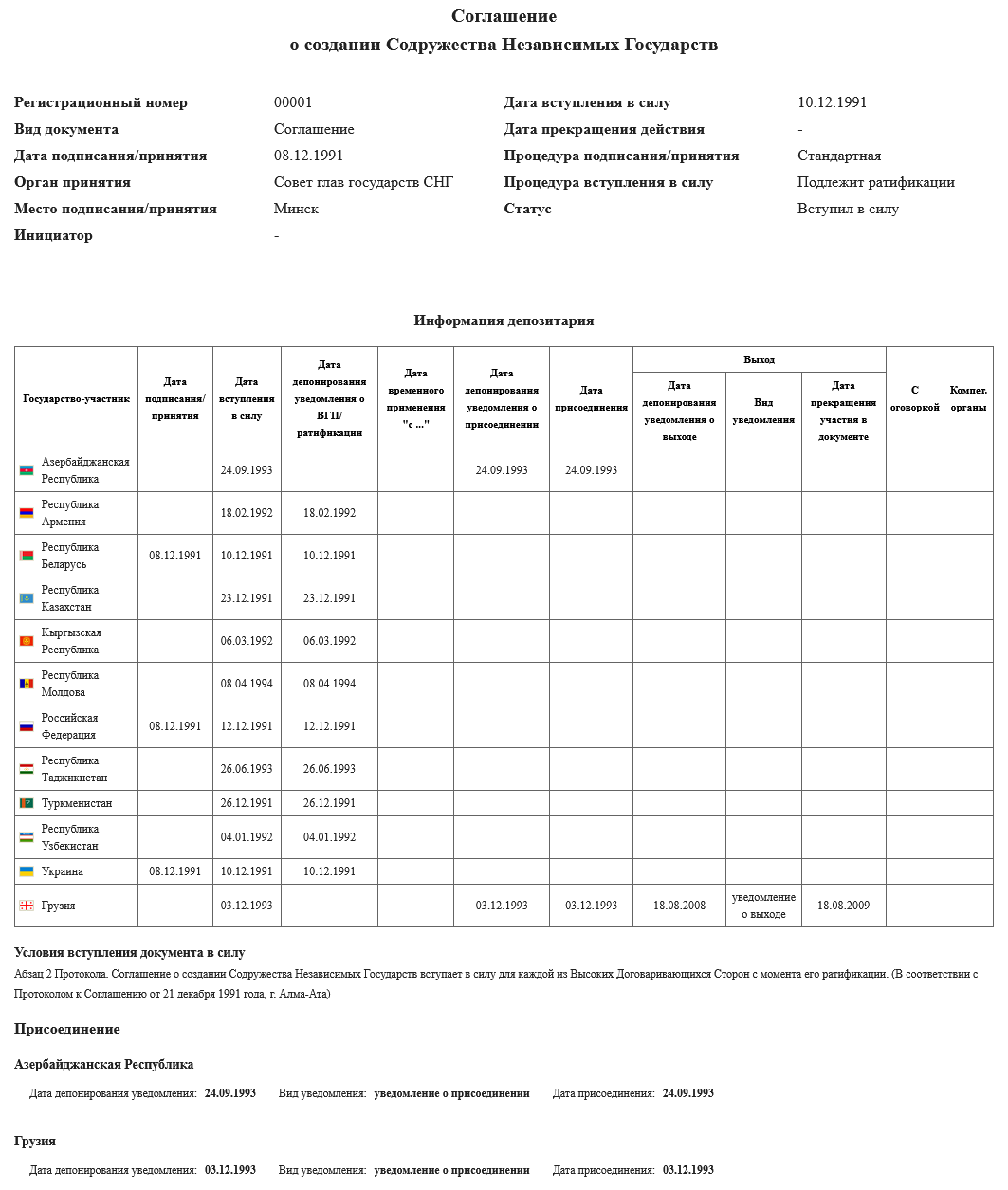
The Agreement on the Creation of the Commonwealth of Independent States, dated 8 December 1991. The information from the depository of the international agreement is published on the Unified Register of Legal Acts and Other Documents of the Commonwealth of Independent States (under the executive committee of the Commonwealth of Independent States) as of 2024.

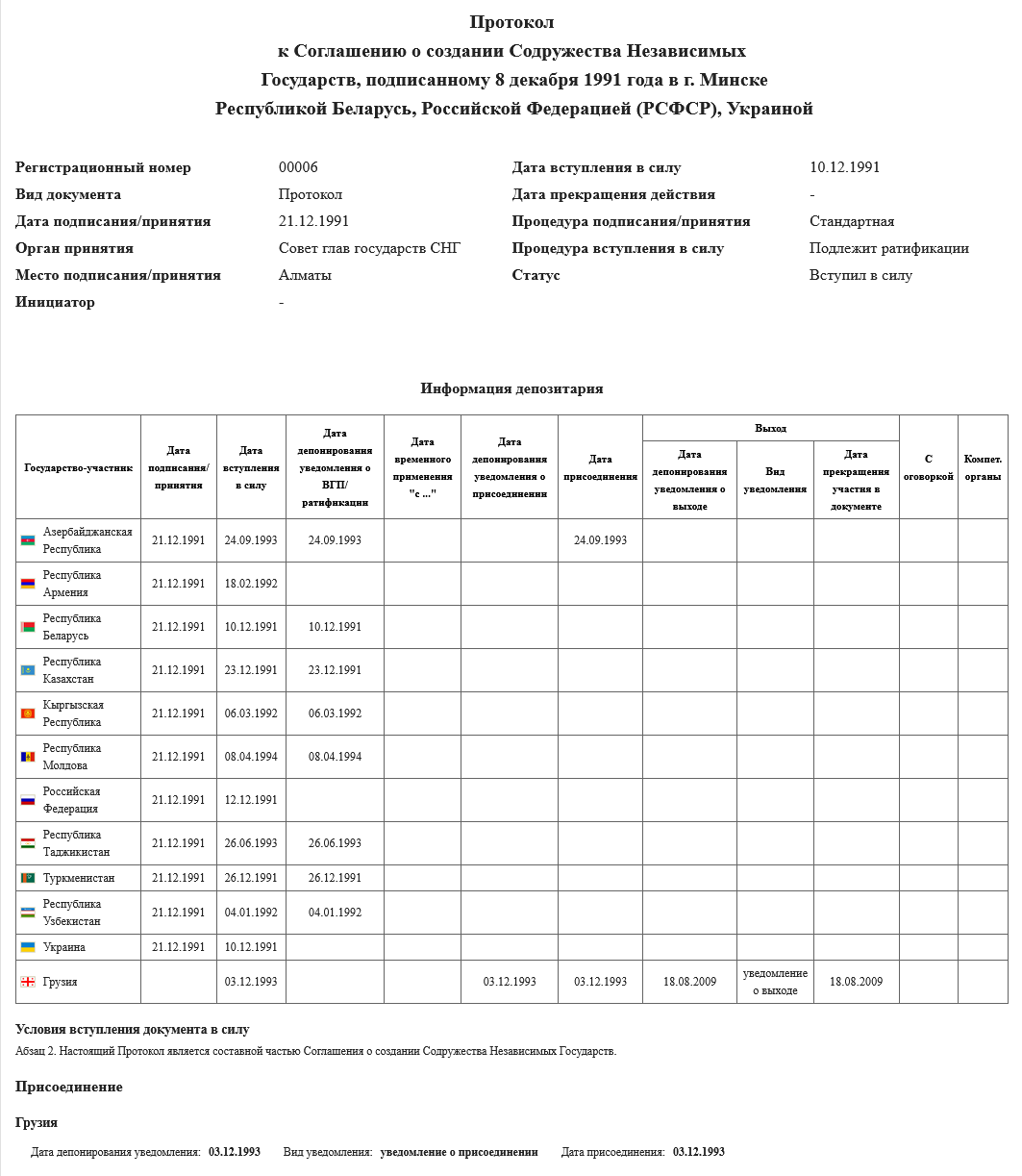
The Protocol to the Agreement on the Creation of the Commonwealth of Independent States, dated 21 December 1991. The information from the depository of the international agreement is published on the Unified Register of Legal Acts and Other Documents of the Commonwealth of Independent States (under the executive committee of the Commonwealth of Independent States) as of 2024.

After the collapse of the August coup, many republics of the USSR declared their independence, fearing another coup. A week after the Ukrainian independence referendum was held, which kept the chances of the Soviet Union staying together low, the Commonwealth of Independent States was founded in its place on 8 December 1991 by the Republic of Belarus, the Russian SFSR, and Ukraine, when the leaders of the three republics met at the Belovezhskaya Pushcha Natural Reserve, about 50 km (31 mi) north of Brest in Belarus, and signed the "Agreement Establishing the Commonwealth of Independent States", known as the Belovezha Accords. (Note: Russian: Беловежские соглашения, romanised: Belovezhskiye soglasheniya)

The CIS announced that the new organisation would be open to all republics of the former Soviet Union and to other nations sharing the same goals. The CIS charter stated that all the members were sovereign and independent nations and thereby effectively abolished the Soviet Union. On 21 December 1991, the leaders of eight additional former Soviet Republics (Armenia, Azerbaijan, Kazakhstan, Kyrgyzstan, Moldova, Turkmenistan, Tajikistan, and Uzbekistan) signed the Alma-Ata Protocol which can either be interpreted as expanding the CIS to these states or the proper foundation or foundation date of the CIS, thus bringing the number of participating countries to 11. Georgia joined two years later, in December 1993. At this point, 12 of the 15 former Soviet Republics participated in the CIS, the three non-participants being the Baltic states of Estonia, Latvia, and Lithuania. The CIS and the Soviet Union also legally co-existed briefly with each other until 26 December 1991, when the Soviet of the Republics formally dissolved the Soviet Union. This was followed by Ivan Korotchenya becoming Executive Secretary of the CIS on the same day.

After the end of the dissolution process of the Soviet Union, Russia and the Central Asian republics were weakened economically and faced declines in GDP. Post-Soviet states underwent economic reforms and privatisation. The process of Eurasian integration began immediately after the breakup of the Soviet Union to salvage economic ties with post-Soviet republics.

=== CIS Charter ===
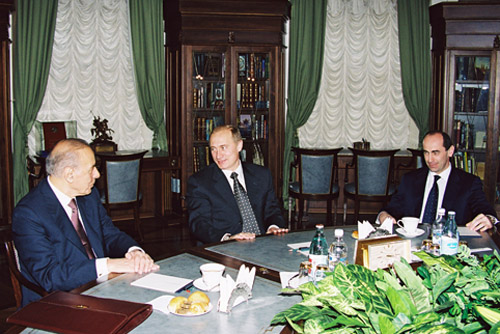
The 20–22 June 2000 CIS Summit

On 22 January 1993, the Charter (Statutes) of the CIS was signed, setting up the different institutions of the CIS, their functions, and the rules and statutes of the CIS. The Charter also defined that all countries that have ratified the Agreement on the Establishment of the CIS and its relevant (Alma-Ata) Protocol would be considered to be founding states of the CIS, with only those countries ratifying the Charter being considered to be member states of the CIS (art. 7). Other states can participate as associate members or observers if accepted as such by a decision of the Council of Heads of State to the CIS (art. 8).

All the founding states, apart from Ukraine and Turkmenistan, ratified the Charter of the CIS and became member states of it. Nevertheless, Ukraine and Turkmenistan kept participating in the CIS, without being member states of it. Turkmenistan became an associate member of the CIS in August 2005. Georgia left the CIS altogether in 2009 and Ukraine stopped participating in 2018.

=== General secretary ===
The work of CIS is coordinated by the general secretary.

General secretaries
Name	Term
(Belarus) Ivan Korotchenya	14 May 1993 – 29 April 1998
(Russia) Boris Berezovsky	29 April 1998 – 4 March 1999
(Belarus) Ivan Korotchenya	4 March 1999 – 2 April 1999
(Russia) Yury Yarov	2 April 1999 – 14 July 2004
(Russia) Vladimir Rushailo	14 July 2004 – 5 October 2007
(Russia) Sergei Lebedev	5 October 2007 – present

=== Interparliamentary Assembly ===
The CIS Interparliamentary Assembly was established on 27 March 1992 in Kazakhstan. On 26 May 1995, the CIS leaders signed the Convention on the Interparliamentary Assembly of Member Nations of the Commonwealth of Independent States eventually ratified by nine parliaments; the only CIS member not signing was Georgia. Under the terms of the convention, the InterParliamentary Assembly (IPA) was invested with international legitimacy.

It is housed in the Tauride Palace in St Petersburg and acts as the consultative parliamentary wing of the CIS, created to discuss problems of parliamentary cooperation, review draft documents of common interest, and pass model laws to the national legislatures in the CIS (as well as recommendations) for their use in the preparation of new laws and amendments to existing legislation. More than 130 documents have been adopted that ensure the convergence of laws in the CIS at the level of national legislation. The Assembly is actively involved in the development of integration processes in the CIS and also sends observers to the national elections. The Assembly held its 32nd Plenary meeting in Saint Petersburg on 14 May 2009.

=== Further developments ===
Between 2003 and 2005, three CIS member states experienced a change of government in a series of colour revolutions: Eduard Shevardnadze was overthrown in Georgia; Viktor Yushchenko was elected in Ukraine; and Askar Akayev was toppled in Kyrgyzstan.

In February 2006, Georgia withdrew from the Council of Defense Ministers, with the statement that "Georgia has taken a course to join NATO and it cannot be part of two military structures simultaneously", but it remained a full member of the CIS until August 2009, one year after officially withdrawing in the immediate aftermath of the Russo-Georgian War.

In March 2007, Igor Ivanov, the secretary of the Russian Security Council, expressed his doubts concerning the usefulness of the CIS, emphasising that the Eurasian Economic Community was becoming a more competent organisation to unify the largest countries of the CIS. Following the withdrawal of Georgia, the presidents of Uzbekistan, Tajikistan, and Turkmenistan skipped the October 2009 meeting of the CIS, each having their own issues and disagreements with the Russian Federation.

In May 2009, Armenia, Azerbaijan, Belarus, Georgia, Moldova, and Ukraine joined the Eastern Partnership (EaP), a project that was initiated by the European Union (EU). The EaP framework governs the EU's relationship with the post-Soviet states of Armenia, Azerbaijan, Belarus, Georgia, Moldova, and Ukraine.

== Membership ==
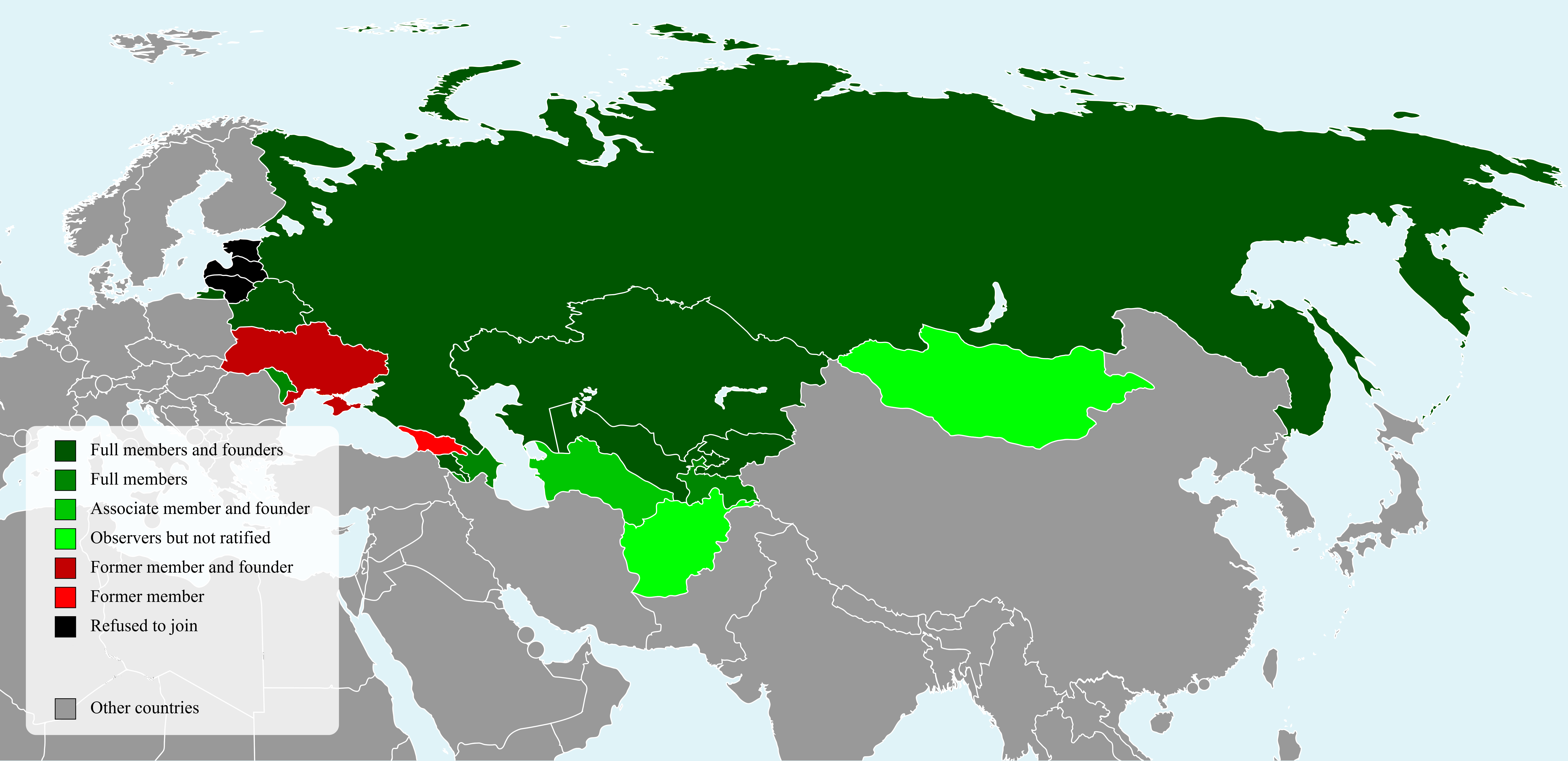

There are nine full member states of the Commonwealth of Independent States.

The Creation Agreement remained the main constituent document of the CIS until January 1993, when the CIS Charter (Russian: Устав, romanised: Ustav) was adopted. The charter formalised the concept of membership: a member country is defined as a country that ratifies the CIS Charter (sec. 2, art. 7). Additional members can join with the consent of all current members. Parties that ratified the Creation Agreement before the adoption of the Charter are considered to be "Founding states", but not members.

=== Member states ===
Country	Signed	Agreement ratified	Charter ratified	Notes
Armenia	21 December 1991	18 February 1992	16 March 1994	Founding state. Signatory of the Alma-Ata Protocol
Azerbaijan	21 December 1991	24 September 1993	14 December 1993	Signatory of the Alma-Ata Protocol.
Belarus	8 December 1991	10 December 1991	18 January 1994	Founding state. Signatory of both the Belovezha Accords and the Alma-Ata Protocol.
Kazakhstan	21 December 1991	23 December 1991	20 April 1994	Founding state. Signatory of the Alma-Ata Protocol.
Kyrgyzstan	21 December 1991	6 March 1992	12 April 1994	Founding state. Signatory of the Alma-Ata Protocol.
Moldova	21 December 1991	8 April 1994	27 June 1994	Signatory of the Alma-Ata Protocol, in process of withdrawing. Active participation in CIS meetings ceased in November 2022, the CIS treaty, its protocol and charter were denounced in April 2026 and withdrawal from the organization will be effective on 8 April 2027.
Russia	8 December 1991	12 December 1991	20 July 1993	Founding state. Signatory of both the Belovezha Accords and the Alma-Ata Protocol.
Tajikistan	21 December 1991	26 June 1993	14 August 1993	Signatory of the Alma-Ata Protocol.
Uzbekistan	21 December 1991	4 January 1992	9 February 1994	Founding state. Signatory of the Alma-Ata Protocol.

==== Moldova ====
In light of Russia's continued occupation of breakaway regions within Moldova, Georgia, and Ukraine as well as its violation of the Istanbul Agreement, legislative initiatives to denounce the agreement on the creation of CIS were tabled in Moldova's parliament on 25 March 2014, though they were not approved. A similar bill was proposed in January 2018.

On 14 June 2022, Moldovan Minister of Foreign Affairs Nicu Popescu said the Moldovan government was considering the prospect of leaving the CIS, although at the end of May President Maia Sandu had said the country would not leave for the time being. An August 2021 poll conducted in Moldova (prior to the start of Russia's invasion of Ukraine) found that 48.1% of respondents supported Moldova's withdrawal from the CIS.

On 30 November 2022, Popescu stated that Moldova would suspend its participation in CIS meetings, and on 23 February 2023 stated that Moldova had started withdrawing from multiple treaties that the country had signed with the CIS, as his country aimed to join the European Union. On 15 May 2023, the President of the Parliament of Moldova, Igor Grosu, stated the country would withdraw from the agreement establishing the CIS Interparliamentary Assembly; he argued that being in the CIS "did not protect the Republic of Moldova from energy blackmail in the middle of winter, from threats and official statements hostile to the independence and sovereignty of the Republic of Moldova".

As part of the process of severing connections with the CIS, in July 2023 Moldova passed a law denouncing the agreement on Moldova's membership in the Inter-Parliamentary Assembly of the CIS countries. 70 agreements were denounced by October 2023, from the total of around 282 signed by Moldova.

In December 2023, Moldova announced its intention to withdraw from the CIS entirely by the end of 2024. It was later stated that Moldova would pull out of everything except for economic, social protection, and healthcare agreements.

A 22–27 May 2024 poll showed that 40.5% of Moldovans were in favour of leaving the CIS and 35.5% were against, with 41.9% in favour and 32% against in a 16–28 April 2025 poll. 53.3% supported leaving the CIS and 32% opposed it in a 14–24 May 2026 poll.

In 2025, Moldova stated that it would continue to participate in the CIS bodies related to economic, social protection, and healthcare agreements.

On 11 March 2026, as part of the procedure for withdrawing from the organisation, the Government of Moldova approved the denunciation of the Agreement on the creation of the CIS, the Alma-Ata Protocol, and the CIS Charter. On 2 April 2026, the Parliament of Moldova voted in favour (60 out of 101 deputies) of a bill denouncing the three treaties in the final reading, having voted in favour of the bill in the first reading on 20 March with 59 votes. The laws were promugated by President Maia Sandu on 8 April, being published in the Official Gazette of Moldova. At the time, Moldova had denounced around 70 agreements with the CIS. To officially finalize its withdrawal, Moldova formally notified the CIS Executive Committee on 8 April of the country's decision to withdraw from the organization's founding treaties, after which Moldova will cease to be a CIS member following a period of 12 months, on 8 April 2027.

=== Associate member ===
A country can become an associate member under the CIS Charter (sec. 2, art. 8) if approved by the Council of Heads of States. Participation of associate members and of the observers in the work of the Commonwealth organs shall be governed by their rules of procedures.

Country	Signed	Agreement ratified	Charter ratified	Associate from	Notes
Turkmenistan	21 December 1991	26 December 1991	Not ratified	August 2005	Founding state. Signatory of the Alma-Ata Protocol. Has never been a full member.

Two states, Ukraine and Turkmenistan ratified the CIS Creation Agreement before the adoption of the CIS Charter in January 1993, making them "founding states of the CIS", but did not ratify the Charter itself that would make them full members. These states, while not being formal members of the CIS, were allowed to participate in CIS. They were also allowed to participate in various CIS initiatives, e.g. the Free Trade Area, which were, however, formulated mostly as independent multilateral agreements, and not as internal CIS agreements.

Turkmenistan has not ratified the Charter and therefore is not formally a member of the CIS. Nevertheless, it has consistently participated in the CIS as if it were a member state.

Turkmenistan changed its CIS standing to associate member as of 26 August 2005. The cited reason was to be consistent with its 1995-proclaimed, UN-recognised, international neutrality status, but experts have cited the country no longer needing Russia to provide natural gas access, as well as the country's declining faith in the confederation's ability to maintain internal stability in light of the Colour Revolutions.

=== Founding state ===
Ukraine established CIS along with Russia and Belarus, by ratifying the Belovezha Accords and the Alma-Ata Protocol in 1991, making it a Founding State of the CIS. However, Ukraine never ratified the CIS Charter, so never became a member state.

Ukraine did not apply to become an Associate member, nor was it granted by the Council of Heads of States, accordingly it remained a founding state.

Nevertheless, Ukraine continued participating in CIS, even though it is not a member. It became an associate member of the CIS Economic Union in 1994, and signed the Commonwealth of Independent States Free Trade Area in 2011.

Country	Signed	Agreement ratified	Charter ratified	Notes
Ukraine	8 December 1991	10 December 1991	Not ratified	Founding state, by ratifying the Belovezha Accords; Did not ratify the CIS Charter, so never became a full member state; Largely ceased to participate from 2014 onwards; Withdrew its representatives in May 2018; Denounced various CIS treaties as of 2024; Has not formally withdrawn from the Belovezha Accords and the Alma-Ata Protocol, thus it continues to be recognised as a founding state

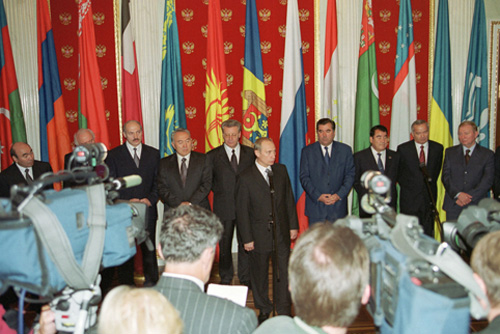
Representatives of Ukraine, Russia, Belarus, Kazakhstan, and other states at the 20–22 June 2000 CIS Summit in Moscow

Following the start of the Russo-Ukrainian war in February 2014, relations between Ukraine and Russia deteriorated, leading Ukraine to consider ending its participation in the CIS. As Ukraine never ratified the Charter, it could cease its informal participation in the CIS. However, to fully terminate its relationship with the CIS, it would need to legally withdraw from the Creation Agreement, as Georgia did previously. On 14 March 2014, a bill was introduced to Ukraine's parliament to denounce their ratification of the CIS Creation Agreement, but it was never approved. Following the 2014 parliamentary election, a new bill to denounce the CIS founding agreement was introduced. In September 2015, the Ukrainian Ministry of Foreign Affairs confirmed Ukraine would continue participating in the CIS "on a selective basis." Since that month, Ukraine has had no representatives in the CIS Executive Committee building.

In April 2018, Ukrainian President Petro Poroshenko indicated that Ukraine would formally stop participating in the CIS. On 19 May 2018, Poroshenko signed a decree formally ending Ukraine's participation in CIS statutory bodies.

As of 1 June 2018, the CIS secretariat stated that it had not received a formal notice from Ukraine of its withdrawal from the CIS, a process that would take one year to complete, following notice being given. The CIS secretariat stated that it will continue inviting Ukraine to participate. Ukraine has stated that it intends to review its participation in all CIS agreements and only continue in those that are in its interests. On 3 May 2023, Ukraine formally withdrew from the 1992 agreement that set up the CIS Interparliamentary Assembly. In 2023 and 2024 Ukraine also withdrew from several agreements, including:

1. Commonwealth of Independent States (CIS) agreement on cooperation in the provision of safety of hazardous industrial facilities (2001)
2. CIS agreement on cooperation in evacuating nationals from third countries in emergencies (1996)
3. Agreement between the State Parties of the Commonwealth of Independent States on social and legal guarantees of the military personnel, persons discharged from military service, and members of their families (1992)
4. Agreement on the Establishment of the Council of Commanders of the Border Troops (1992)
5. Agreement on the Creation of the Interstate System of Documentary Encrypted Communications of the Commonwealth of Independent States

On 26 March 2026, Foreign Minister Andrii Sybiha announced that the government decided to withdraw from another 116 CIS treaties.

=== Former member states ===
Country	Signed	Agreement ratified	Charter ratified	Withdrawn	Effective	Notes
Georgia	3 December 1993	3 December 1993	19 April 1994	18 August 2008	18 August 2009	Withdrew as a result of the Russo-Georgian War of 2008.

==== Georgia ====
Following the overthrow of Eduard Shevardnadze in Georgia, Georgia officially withdrew from the Council of Defense Ministers in February 2006, stating that "Georgia has taken a course to join NATO and it cannot be part of two military structures simultaneously". However, it remained a full member of the CIS.

In the aftermath of the Russo-Georgian War in 2008, President Saakashvili announced during a public speech in the capital, Tbilisi, that Georgia would leave the CIS and the Georgian Parliament voted unanimously on 14 August 2008 to withdraw from the regional organisation. On 18 August 2008, the Ministry of Foreign Affairs of Georgia sent a note to the CIS Executive Committee notifying it of the aforesaid resolutions of the Parliament of Georgia, and Georgia's withdrawal from CIS Creation Agreement and Charter. In accordance with the CIS Charter (sec. 1, art. 9), Georgia's withdrawal came into effect 12 months later, on 18 August 2009.

== Politics ==
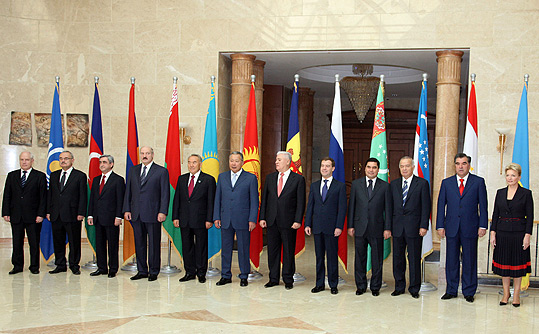
Meeting of CIS leaders in Bishkek, 2008

=== Human rights ===
Since its inception, one of the primary goals of the CIS has been to provide a forum for discussing issues related to the social and economic development of the newly independent states. To achieve this goal, member states have agreed to promote and protect human rights. Initially, efforts to achieve this goal consisted merely of statements of goodwill, but on 26 May 1995, the CIS adopted a Commonwealth of Independent States Convention on Human Rights and Fundamental Freedoms.

In 22 January, 1993, two years before the 1995 human rights treaty, Article 33 of the Charter of the CIS created a Human Rights Commission with its seat in Minsk, Belarus. This was confirmed by the decision of the Council of Heads of States of the CIS in 1993. In 1995, the CIS adopted a human rights treaty that includes civil and political as well as social and economic human rights. This treaty entered into force in 1998. The CIS treaty is modeled on the European Convention on Human Rights, but lacks the strong implementation mechanisms of the latter. Furthermore, in the CIS treaty, the Human Rights Commission has a very vaguely defined authority. The Statute of the Human Rights Commission, however, also adopted by the CIS Member States as a decision, gives the commission the right to receive inter-state as well as individual communications.

CIS members, especially in Central Asia, continue to have among the world's poorest human rights records. Many activists point to examples such as the 2005 Andijan massacre in Uzbekistan to show that there has been almost no improvement in human rights since the collapse of the Soviet Union in Central Asia. The consolidation of power by President Vladimir Putin has resulted in a steady decline in the modest progress of previous years in Russia. In turn, this has led to little to no scrutiny by Russia when it comes to the situation of human rights in other CIS member states. The Commonwealth of Independent States continues to face serious challenges in meeting even basic international standards.

=== Military ===
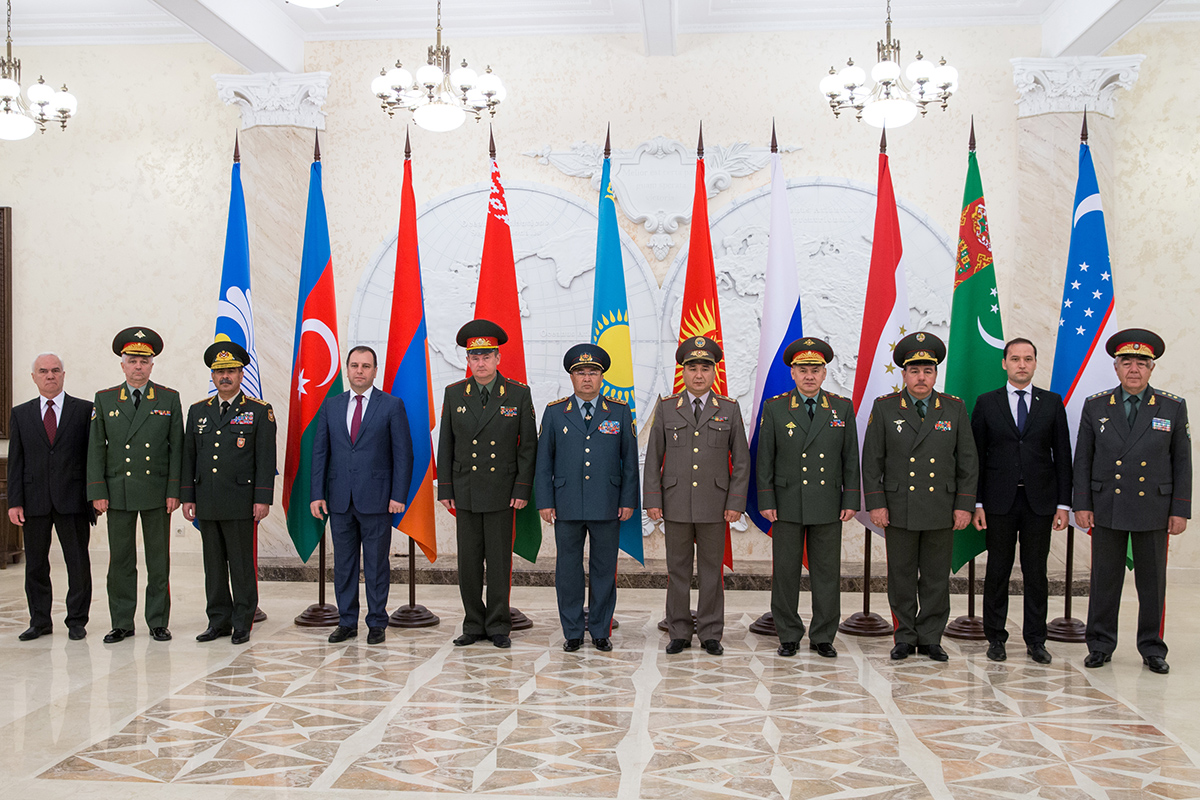
The members of the Council of Ministers of Defense meeting in Moscow in 2017

The CIS Charter establishes the Council of Ministers of Defence, which is vested with the task of coordinating military cooperation of the CIS member states that wish to participate.

In May 1992, six post-Soviet states belonging to the CIS signed the Collective Security Treaty (also referred to as the Tashkent Pact or Tashkent Treaty). Three other post-Soviet states signed in 1993 and the treaty took effect in 1994 and lasted 5 years. When the treaty was subsequently renewed, three countries withdrew, leaving Armenia, Belarus, Kazakhstan, Kyrgyzstan, Russia, and Tajikistan as members.

In December 1993, the CIS Armed Forces Headquarters was abolished. Instead, "the CIS Council of Defence Ministers created a CIS Military Cooperation Coordination Headquarters (MCCH) in Moscow, with 50 percent of the funding provided by Russia." General Viktor Samsonov was appointed as Chief of Staff. The headquarters has now moved to 101000, Москва (Moscow), Сверчков переулок, 3/2.

An important manifestation of integration processes in the area of military and defence collaboration of the CIS member states is the creation, in 1995, of the joint CIS Air Defense System. Over the years, the military personnel of the joint CIS Air Defense System grew twofold along the western, European border of the CIS, and by 1.5 times on its southern borders.

In 2002, the six member states agreed to create the Collective Security Treaty Organisation (CSTO) as a military alliance.

In October 6, 2007, CSTO members agreed to create a CSTO peacekeeping force.

One of the CST's original objectives was to resolve conflicts between CIS members, however military conflicts such as Russia's open assistance and support to the two secessionist areas in Georgia, Russia seizing Crimea and supporting secessionist areas in Ukraine, Russia stationing troops in a secessionist area in Moldova, the conflict between Armenia and Azerbaijan, and Kyrgyzstan and Tajikistan border issues have demonstrated how ineffective the CST and later the CSTO, is in this role.

== Economy ==
Corruption and bureaucracy are serious problems for trade in CIS countries.

Kazakhstan's President Nursultan Nazarbayev proposed that CIS members take up a digitisation agenda to modernise CIS economies.

Economic data

Country	Population (2021)	GDP (USD million)			GDP growth (2012)	GDP per capita				Human Development Index (2019)
Country	Population (2021)	2007	2012	2022	GDP growth (2012)	2007	2012	2020	2022	Human Development Index (2019)
Armenia	2,790,974	9,204	10,551	13,679	2.1%	2,996	3,500	4,268	4,888	0.776
Azerbaijan	10,312,992	33,049	71,043	76,123	3.8%	3,829	7,500	4,214	4,665	0.756
Belarus	9,578,167	45,275	65,685	78,276	4.3%	4,656	6,940	6,411	6,830	0.823
Kazakhstan	19,196,465	104,849	196,642	210,896	5.2%	6,805	11,700	9,122	10,240	0.825
Kyrgyzstan	6,527,743	3,802	6,197	7,543	0.8%	711	1,100	1,174	1,265	0.697
Moldova	3,061,506	4,401	7,589	8,947	4.4%	1,200	2,100	4,551	4,850	0.750
Russia	145,102,755	1,294,381	2,022,000	2,103,400	3.4%	9,119	14,240	10,127	10,890	0.824
Tajikistan	9,750,064	3,695	7,263	8,456	2.1%	526	960	859	915	0.668
Uzbekistan	34,081,449	22,355	63,622	70,452	4.1%	831	2,137	1,686	1,820	0.720

=== Standards and rules ===
GOST standards were originally developed by the government of the Soviet Union as part of its national standardisation strategy. After the disintegration of the USSR, the GOST standards acquired a new status of the regional standards. They are now administered by the Euro-Asian Council for Standardization, Metrology, and Certification (EASC), a standards organisation chartered by the Commonwealth of Independent States.

=== Supranational integration initiatives, trade, and economic cooperation within CIS ===
On 24 September 1993, an Agreement on the Economic Union was signed by the heads of a number of CIS states. Its aim was the forming of conditions of stable development of economies of Contracting Parties to benefit from increases in living standards of their population. This led to other specific agreements.

The terms of the CIS FTA agreements allow member states to enter into the FTA agreements with other countries, as well as to join/create custom unions. Like other Commonwealth of Independent States agreements, this agreement does not regulate relations with third countries and allows differentiated integration (aka à la carte and multi-speed Europe).

==== 1994 Framework for Bilateral Free Trade Agreements and Freedom of Transit ====
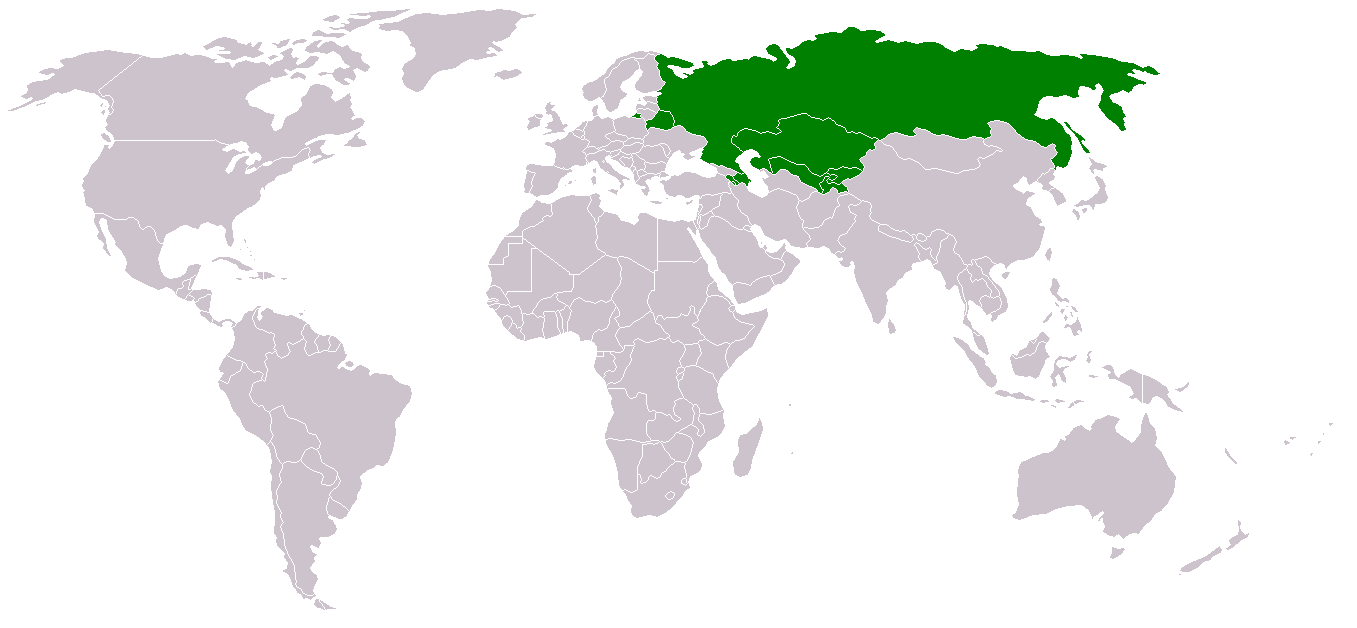
1994 agreement signatories

On 15 April 1994, at a meeting of the Commonwealth of Independent States (CIS) Council of Heads of State in Moscow, the presidents of 12 countries, namely Armenia, Azerbaijan, Belarus, Georgia, Kazakhstan, Kyrgyzstan, Moldova, Russia, Tajikistan, Turkmenistan, Uzbekistan, and Ukraine signed an Agreement on the Establishment of a Free Trade Area (Соглашение о создании зоны свободной торговли). The Agreement entered into force on 30 December 1994 for those countries that had completed ratification. As of 2023, the Agreement is fully in force for Armenia, Azerbaijan, Belarus, Georgia, Kazakhstan, Kyrgyzstan, Moldova, Tajikistan, Uzbekistan and Ukraine, while Russia and Turkmenistan have notified the application of the Agreement on a provisional basis. According to the executive committee of the Commonwealth of Independent States, no one has ceased participation in the Agreement, made reservations or suspended the application.

Bilateral FTAs concluded on the basis of CIS 1994 as a framework agreement. According to the analytical material of the executive committee of the Commonwealth of Independent States, the 1994 version has not yet provided for multilateral free trade, but the conclusion of many bilateral agreements. Under the 1994 version, the free trade regime enters into force when conditions are met, but, for example, the freedom of transit enters into force immediately between participants. According to the text, transit transportation should not be subject to unreasonable delays or restrictions, and the conditions of transit, including tariffs for transportation by any mode of transport and the provision of services, should not be worse than for domestic shippers, recipients, and owners of goods, as well as no worse than the conditions for any third country.

==== 1999 Protocol introducing a multilateral free trade among ten countries ====
On 2 April 1999, in Moscow, the presidents of 11 countries, namely Armenia, Azerbaijan, Belarus, Georgia, Kazakhstan, Kyrgyzstan, Moldova, Russia, Tajikistan, Uzbekistan and Ukraine signed a Protocol on Amendments and Additions to the Agreement on the Establishment of a Free Trade Area of 15 April 1994 (Протокол о внесении изменений и дополнений в Соглашение о создании зоны свободной торговли от 15 апреля 1994 года). Turkmenistan did not participate. The Protocol entered into force on 24 November 1999 for those countries that had completed ratification. As of 2023, the Protocol has entered into force for all countries, namely Armenia, Azerbaijan, Belarus, Georgia, Kazakhstan, Kyrgyzstan, Moldova, Tajikistan, Uzbekistan, and Ukraine, except Russia, which remains a signatory but has not notified entry into force or provisional application. According to the executive committee of the Commonwealth of Independent States, no one has ceased participation in the Protocol or suspended the application, while one reservation was made by Azerbaijan on non-application in relation to Armenia and two specific opinions were expressed by Georgia and Ukraine.

According to the analytical material of the executive committee of the Commonwealth of Independent States, the 1999 Protocol replaced the existing bilateral free trade regime with a multilateral regime, eliminated all fees, as well as taxes and levies with equivalent effect, and quantitative restrictions on the import and export of goods in mutual trade of the FTA participating states, established a procedure for dispute resolution, etc. The 1999 version refers to the principles of the World Trade Organisation, envisages cooperation in economic policy, payments, customs cooperation, taxes, science, provides for a ratchet effect prohibiting the imposition of new tariffs and restrictions, provides for treatment no worse than that of any third country, and provides for the transit of goods on the basis of the principle of freedom of transit without discrimination.

The 2011 CIS FTA Treaty envisages that the 1994 agreement and the 1999 protocol no longer apply among its eight participants (Russia, Ukraine, Belarus, Kazakhstan, Kyrgyzstan, Tajikistan, Armenia, and Moldova), however, among the rest of the countries, they continue to be applied.

International Trade Centre says the 1994 Agreement on the Establishment of a Free Trade Area signed by 12 CIS countries still continues to be used by Azerbaijan and Georgia in trade with other CIS countries except with Russia and Turkmenistan. Reportedly it is also used bilaterally between Uzbekistan and Tajikistan pending Tajikistan's ratification of Uzbekistan's accession to the 2011 CIS Free Trade Area Treaty.

==== 2011 multilateral Free Trade Area Treaty among 9 countries ====
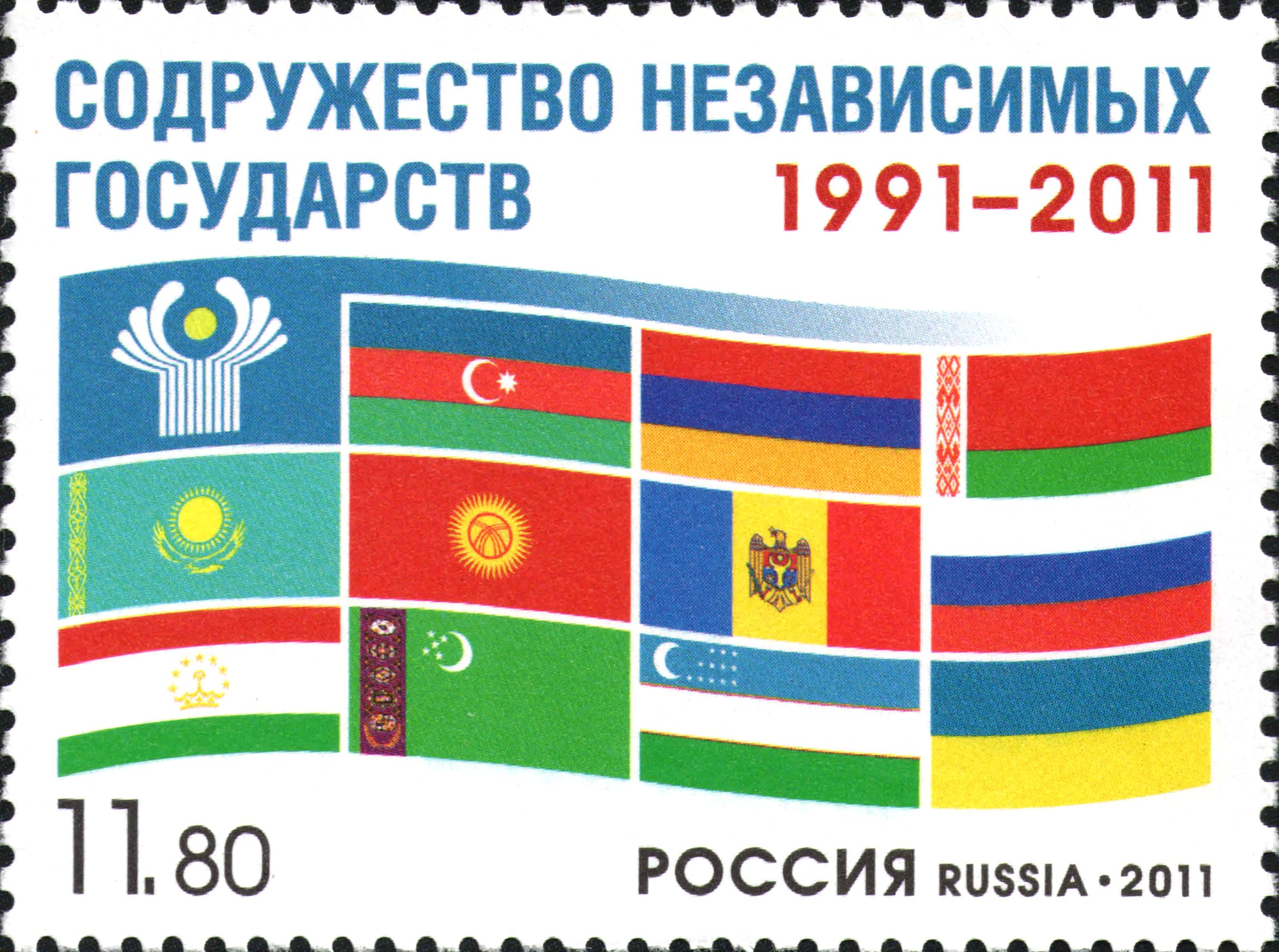
Stamp of 1991–2011, the Commonwealth of Independent States

2011 treaty signatories and parties

In 15 July, 2009, a new agreement was begun to create an FTA, the CIS Free Trade Agreement (CISFTA). In October 2011, the new free trade agreement was signed by eight of the eleven CIS prime ministers; Armenia, Belarus, Kazakhstan, Kyrgyzstan, Moldova, Russia, Tajikistan, and Ukraine at a meeting in St. Petersburg. Initially, the treaty was only ratified by Russia, Belarus, and Ukraine, However, by the end of 2012, Kazakhstan, Armenia, and Moldova had also completed ratification. In December 2013, Uzbekistan, signed and then ratified the treaty, while the remaining two signatories, Kyrgyzstan and Tajikistan later both ratified the treaty in January 2014 and December 2015 respectively. Azerbaijan is the only full CIS member state not to participate in the free trade area.

The free trade agreement eliminates export and import duties on several goods but also contains a number of exemptions that will ultimately be phased out. An agreement was also signed on the basic principles of currency regulation and currency controls in the CIS at the same October 2011 meeting.

==== 2023 Agreement on Free Trade in Services among 7 countries ====
In Sochi on 8 June 2023, Armenia, Belarus, Kazakhstan, Kyrgyzstan, Russia, Tajikistan, and Uzbekistan signed an Agreement on Free Trade in Services, Establishment, Operations, and Investment.

== Social development of the CIS countries ==
Statistics show that, as of 2011, the CIS countries as a whole represent a zone of social disadvantage. It should be borne in mind that the subjective level of poverty, determined on the basis of sociological surveys, often turns out to be significantly higher than the official indicator: for example, the subjective level of poverty in Ukraine is 42%, and the official level is 28%; in Russia, the difference is even greater — 42% and 13%, respectively.

At the end of December 2015, unemployment benefits were received by 1% of registered unemployed in Kyrgyzstan and Tajikistan, 5% in Azerbaijan, 8% in Moldova, 45% in Belarus, 81% in Ukraine and 85% in Russia. Its average amount was 262.3 manats ($201) in Azerbaijan, 216,424 white rubles ($12) in Belarus, 1,255.8 lei ($63) in Moldova, 306.9 somoni ($46) in Tajikistan (November 2015), and 1,444 hryvnia ($60) in Ukraine. The minimum unemployment benefit in Russia is set at 850 rubles (in December, $12), and the maximum is 4,900 rubles ($70). In a number of countries in the region, the allowance has not changed for many years with an increase in the cost of living.

The average monthly salary in dollars in 2015 was $142 in Tajikistan, $193 in Ukraine, $206 in Kyrgyzstan, $245 in Moldova, $386 in Armenia, $413 in Belarus, $445 in Georgia (Q4 2015), $452 in Azerbaijan, $560 in Russia and $565 in Kazakhstan. It still remains low, insufficient to ensure a full-fledged human life, and is actually completely "eaten up." In a number of countries, the majority of the population spends more than half of their salary on food (56% of the population in Kazakhstan, 61% in Russia, 72% in Belarus, 76% in Azerbaijan and Ukraine). With a low salary level, delays in its payment are increasing.:

== Other activities ==
=== Election monitoring ===
The CIS-Election Monitoring Organisation (Russian: Миссия наблюдателей от СНГ на выборах) is an election monitoring body that was formed in October 2002, following a Commonwealth of Independent States heads of states meeting which adopted the Convention on the Standards of Democratic Elections, Electoral Rights, and Freedoms in the Member States of the Commonwealth of Independent States. The CIS-EMO has been sending election observers to member countries of the CIS since this time.

CIS election monitoring has been characterised by scholars as low-quality, as the CIS tends to validate elections that are obviously flawed.

Controversies

The election monitoring body has approved many elections which have been heavily criticised by independent observers.

- The democratic nature of the final round of the 2004 Ukrainian presidential election which followed the Orange Revolution and brought into power the former opposition, was questioned by the CIS while the Organization for Security and Co-operation in Europe (OSCE) found no significant problems. This was the first time that the CIS observation teams challenged the validity of an election, saying that it should be considered illegitimate. On 15 March 2005, the Ukrainian Independent Information Agency quoted Dmytro Svystkov (a spokesman of the Ukrainian Foreign Ministry) that Ukraine had suspended its participation in the CIS election monitoring organisation.
- The CIS praised the Uzbekistan parliamentary elections, 2005 as "legitimate, free and transparent" while the OSCE had referred to the Uzbek elections as having fallen "significantly short of OSCE commitments and other international standards for democratic elections".
- Moldovan authorities refused to invite CIS observers in the 2005 Moldovan parliamentary elections, an action Russia criticised. Many dozens of such observers from Belarus and Russia were stopped from reaching Moldova.
- CIS observers monitored the Tajikistan parliamentary elections, in 2005 and in the end declared them "legal, free and transparent." The same elections were pronounced by the OSCE to have failed international standards for democratic elections.
- Soon after CIS observers hailed the Kyrgyz parliamentary elections of 2005 as "well-organized, free, and fair", as large-scale and often violent demonstrations broke out throughout the country protesting what the opposition called a rigged parliamentary election. In contrast, the OSCE reported that the elections fell short of international standards in many areas.
- International observers of the Interparliamentary Assembly stated the 2010 local elections in Ukraine were organised well. While the Council of Europe uncovered a number of problems in relation to a new electorate law approved just prior to the elections and the Obama administration criticised the conduct of the elections, saying they "did not meet standards for openness and fairness".

=== Russian language status ===
Russia has urged that the Russian language receive official status in all of the CIS member states. So far Russian is an official language in only four states: Russia, Belarus, Kazakhstan, and Kyrgyzstan. Russian is also considered an official language in the region of Transnistria and the autonomous region of Gagauzia in Moldova. After the Ukrainian 2010 election, President Yanukovych stated "Ukraine will continue to promote the Ukrainian language as its only state language."

=== Sports events ===
At the time of the Soviet Union's dissolution in December 1991, its sports teams had been invited to or qualified for various 1992 sports events. A joint CIS team took its place in some of these. The "Unified Team" competed in the 1992 Winter Olympics and 1992 Summer Olympics, and a CIS association football team competed in UEFA Euro 1992. A CIS bandy team played some friendlies in January 1992 and made its last appearance at the 1992 Russian Government Cup, where it also played against the new Russia national bandy team. The Soviet Union bandy championship for 1991–1992 was rebranded as a CIS championship, this lasted just one year before it became Russian bandy.

In 2017, a festival for national sports and games, known as the Festival of National Sports and Games of the Commonwealth of Independent States (Russian: Фестиваль национальных видов спорта и игр государств — участников Содружества Независимых Государств) was held in Ulyanovsk. The main sports were sambo, tug of war, mas-wrestling, gorodki, belt wrestling, lapta, bandy, kettlebell lifting, chess and archery. A few demonstration sports were also a part of the programme.

In 2021 the first CIS games took place in Kazan with 9 nations and 2,000 athletes. The second games took place in 2023 in Belarus.

=== Cultural events ===
The CIS has also been a relevant forum to support cultural relations between former Soviet republics. In 2006, the Council of the Heads of Governments of the CIS launched the Intergovernmental Foundation for Educational, Scientific, and Cultural Cooperation (IFESCCO). IFESSCO has substantially relied on Russia's financial support since its creation and supported several multilateral cultural events, including the ‘CIS Capital of Culture’ initiative. In 2017, the Armenian city of Goris was declared the CIS Cultural Capital of the year, in 2022 it was Karakol in Kyrgyzstan.

== Demographics ==
The combined population of all member states is 246,200,194 as of 2024.

Largest cities or towns in Commonwealth of Independent States Russia, Uzbekistan, Azerbaijan, Kazakhstan, Belarus, Tajikistan, Kyrgyzstan
Rank		Member state	Pop.	Rank		Member state	Pop.
1	Moscow	Russia	13,149,803	11	Kazan	Russia	1,318,604
2	Saint Petersburg	Russia	5,597,763	12	Shymkent	Kazakhstan	1,246,661
3	Tashkent	Uzbekistan	3,075,232	13	Krasnoyarsk	Russia	1,205,473
4	Baku	Azerbaijan	2,300,500	14	Nizhny Novgorod	Russia	1,204,985
5	Almaty	Kazakhstan	2,275,541	15	Chelyabinsk	Russia	1,177,058
6	Minsk	Belarus	1,992,862	16	Ufa	Russia	1,163,304
7	Novosibirsk	Russia	1,633,851	17	Samara	Russia	1,158,952
8	Dushanbe	Tajikistan	1,564,700	18	Bishkek	Kyrgyzstan	1,145,044
9	Yekaterinburg	Russia	1,536,183	19	Rostov-on-Don	Russia	1,140,487
10	Astana	Kazakhstan	1,502,102	20	Krasnodar	Russia	1,138,654

== Life expectancy ==
Life expectancy at birth in the countries of CIS in 2021, according to the World Bank Group are listed below:

Countries	2021				Historical data									COVID-19 impact	
Countries	All	Male	Female	Sex gap	2000	2000 →2014	2014	2014 →2019	2019	2019 →2020	2020	2020 →2021	2021	2019 →2021	2014 →2021
Belarus	72.37	67.30	77.70	10.40	68.91	4.06	72.97	1.26	74.23	−1.77	72.46	−0.09	72.37	−1.86	−0.60
Armenia	72.04	66.55	77.35	10.80	70.62	3.43	74.06	1.38	75.44	−3.27	72.17	−0.13	72.04	−3.40	−2.02
Kyrgyzstan	71.90	67.90	76.10	8.20	68.56	1.84	70.40	1.20	71.60	0.20	71.80	0.10	71.90	0.30	1.50
Tajikistan	71.59	69.57	73.73	4.17	63.26	5.81	69.07	1.80	70.87	−2.87	67.99	3.60	71.59	0.73	2.52
Uzbekistan	70.86	68.33	73.39	5.06	65.72	4.51	70.23	1.11	71.34	−1.01	70.33	0.53	70.86	−0.48	0.63
Kazakhstan	70.23	66.33	74.03	7.70	65.45	5.99	71.44	1.74	73.18	−1.81	71.37	−1.14	70.23	−2.95	−1.21
Azerbaijan	69.37	65.65	73.29	7.64	64.89	6.22	71.12	1.99	73.10	−6.23	66.87	2.50	69.37	−3.74	−1.75
Russia	69.36	64.21	74.77	10.56	65.48	5.26	70.74	2.34	73.08	−1.75	71.34	−1.98	69.36	−3.72	−1.38
Turkmenistan	69.26	65.86	72.66	6.80	65.03	3.59	68.61	0.39	69.00	−0.31	68.69	0.58	69.26	0.26	0.65
Moldova	68.85	64.44	73.55	9.10	66.42	2.61	69.03	1.90	70.94	−0.77	70.17	−1.32	68.85	−2.09	−0.19

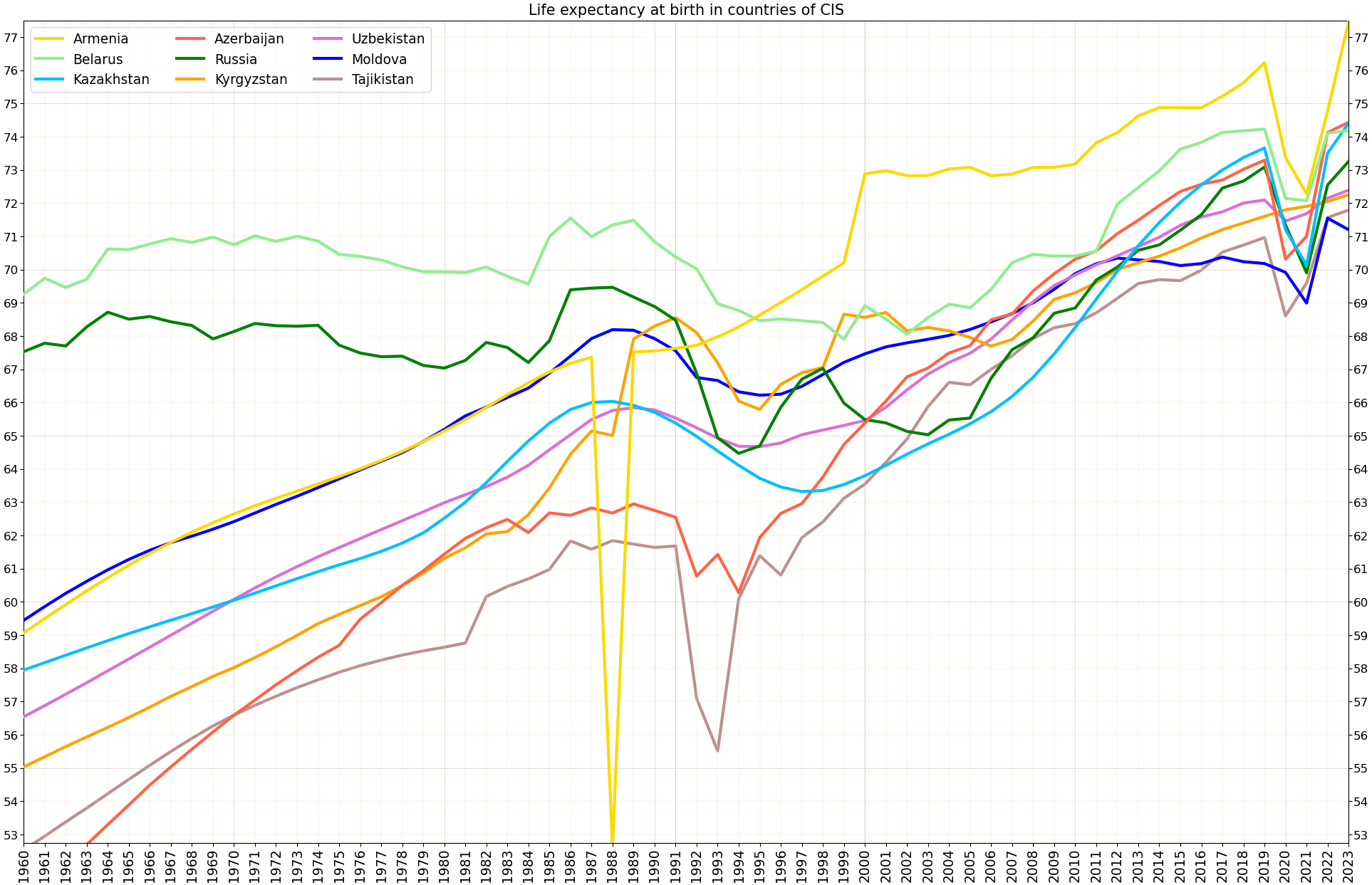
Life expectancy at birth in countries of CIS since 1960

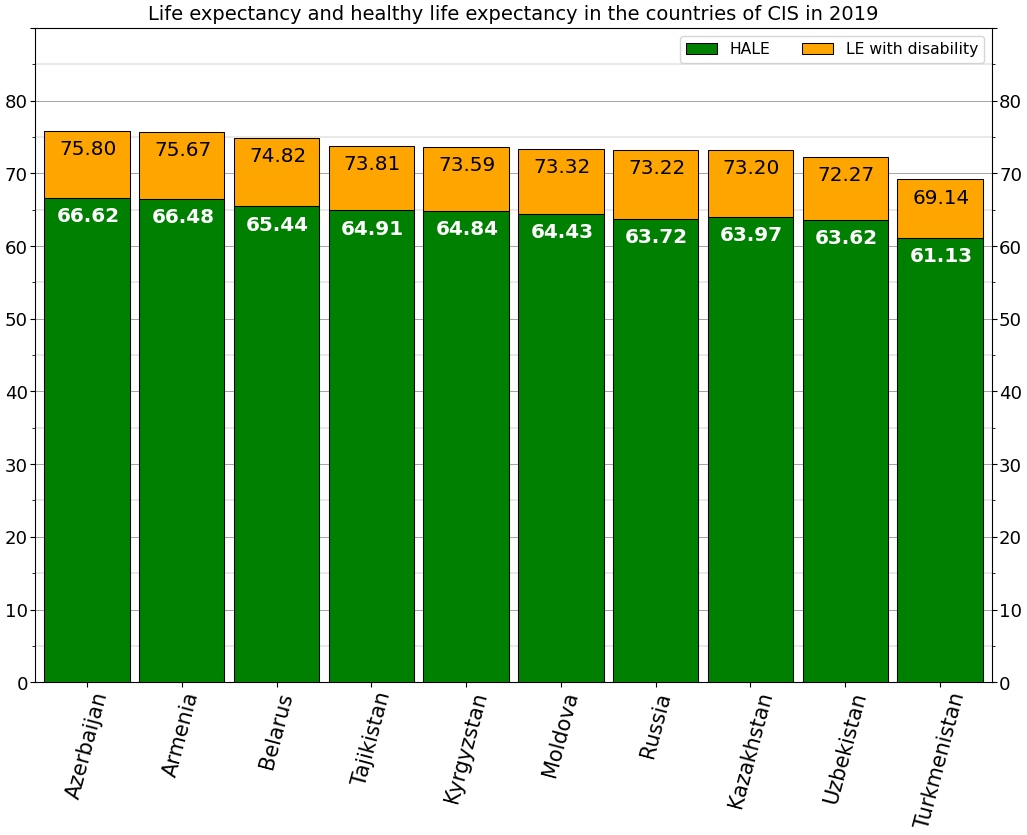
Life expectancy and healthy life expectancy in countries of CIS in 2019

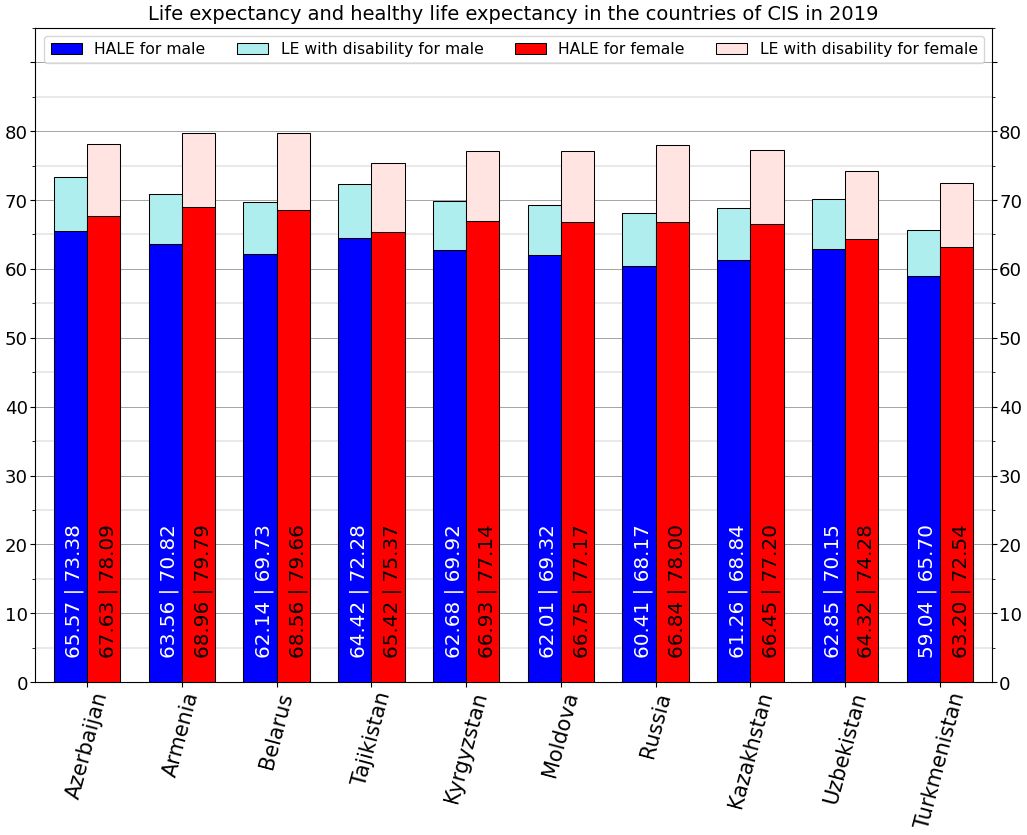
Elaboration by gender

== Post-Soviet organisations and initiatives outside CIS framework ==
A clickable Euler diagram showing the relationships among various supranational organisations in the territory of the former Soviet Union

=== EurAsEc and EAEU ===
==== Common Economic Space ====
After a discussion about the creation of a common economic space between the Commonwealth of Independent States (CIS) countries of Russia, Ukraine, Belarus, and Kazakhstan, agreement in principle about the creation of this space was announced after a meeting in the Moscow suburb of Novo-Ogarevo on 23 February 2003. The Common Economic Space would involve a supranational commission on trade and tariffs that would be based in Kyiv, would initially be headed by a representative of Kazakhstan, and would not be subordinate to the governments of the four nations. The ultimate goal would be a regional organisation that would be open for other countries to join as well, and could eventually lead even to a single currency.

On 22 May 2003, the Verkhovna Rada (the Ukrainian Parliament) voted 266 votes in favour and 51 against the joint economic space. However, most believe that Viktor Yushchenko's victory in the Ukrainian presidential election of 2004 was a significant blow against the project: Yushchenko had shown renewed interest in Ukrainian membership in the European Union and such membership would be incompatible with the envisioned common economic space. Yushchenko's successor Viktor Yanukovych stated on 27 April 2010: "Ukraine's entry into the Customs Union of Russia, Belarus and Kazakhstan is not possible today, since the economic principles and the laws of the WTO do not allow it, we develop our policy following WTO principles". Ukraine has been a WTO member since 2008.

A Customs Union of Belarus, Kazakhstan and Russia was thus created in 2010, A single market had been envisioned for 2012, but instead the customs union was renamed as the Eurasian Customs Union and expanded to include Armenia and Kyrgyzstan in 2015.

=== Organisation of Central Asian Cooperation ===
Kazakhstan, Kyrgyzstan, Tajikistan, Turkmenistan and Uzbekistan formed the Central Asian Commonwealth (CAC) in 1991. The organisation continued in 1994 as the Central Asian Economic Union (CAEU), in which Tajikistan and Turkmenistan did not participate. In 1998 it became the Central Asian Economic Cooperation (CAEC), which marked the return of Tajikistan. On 28 February 2002, it was renamed to its current name. Russia joined on 28 May 2004. On 7 October 2005, it was decided between the member states that Uzbekistan will join the Eurasian Economic Community and that the organisations will merge. The organisations joined on 25 January 2006. It is not clear what will happen to the status of current CACO observers that are not observers to EurAsEC (Georgia and Turkey).

=== Community for Democracy and Rights of Nations ===
The post-Soviet disputed states of Abkhazia, South Ossetia, and Transnistria are all members of the Community for Democracy and Rights of Nations which aims to forge closer integration among the members.

=== GUAM Organization for Democracy and Economic Development ===
The GUAM Organization for Democracy and Economic Development is a regional organisation of four post-Soviet states: Georgia, Ukraine, Azerbaijan, and Moldova.

== Assessments and criticism ==
Abulfaz Elchibey, the 2nd president of Azerbaijan, called the CIS a "big collective farm" that Russia uses to "preserve the old empire":

A serious mistake was made during the construction of such an entity as the CIS. Perhaps it could have stood if it had been conceived as a Commonwealth of Nations of Independent States — I emphasize the word "independent", in which the rights of each State: Armenia, Georgia and Azerbaijana — would be protected. Abkhazians in Abkhazia is using Russian troops to oust the Georgian population. Is this a Commonwealth of Nations? Russia uses the CIS, trying to preserve the old empire in a new form and inventing various mechanisms for this. The CIS leaders have not made at least one serious attempt to resolve the Armenian-Azerbaijani conflict or any other conflicts within the territory of post-Soviet zone. I once called the CIS a big collective farm without rights. Such a collective farm will inevitably fall apart, and this, in fact, has already happened.

Russian diplomat A. Denisov does not believe that the CIS is being used by Russia to realise imperial ambitions, to restore the USSR:

As for the "imperial ambitions", the restoration of the USSR. The CIS is an organisation that builds its work on the basis of consensus. Any participating State has the right to veto any decision. In practice, the principle of the so-called "moving geometry" is being implemented, when states decide which projects they should participate in and which not. Moreover, even the non-recognition of the legal personality of the CIS by one of the states does not prevent its participation in areas of cooperation beneficial to it in the Commonwealth format. I have already mentioned Georgia. Against this background, what imperial ambitions of Russia can we even talk about? It's just ridiculous.

Mikhail Krotov, a Russian scientist, government and international civil servant, who headed the Council of the CIS Interparliamentary Assembly in 1992–2012, writes that the liquidation of the USSR and the independence of Belarus, Russia and Ukraine through the signing of the Belovezha Accords on 8 December 1991, and then other Soviet republics, according to the Alma Ata Declaration on 21 December 1991, were "They are directly linked to the creation of the Commonwealth of Independent States as an interstate association forming a common socio-economic space., a common military-strategic space under a joint command, conducting a coordinated foreign policy and protecting the ethnic, cultural, linguistic, etc. rights of national minorities." Krotov emphasises that in order to meet Ukraine halfway, the CIS founding document significantly reduced the level of integration, limited its scope and excluded supranational functions of the Commonwealth bodies, but "Ukraine did not sign even such a weakened version of the CIS Charter," which, according to the author, "grossly violated the terms of its withdrawal from the USSR.". In this regard, Krotov agrees with Russian President Vladimir Putin's conclusion that "Ukraine did not legally gain independence.".

American geopolitician Zbigniew Brzezinski believed that "it was Ukraine's actions... that prevented the CIS from becoming just a new name for a more federal USSR."

== Coins ==
- The Central Bank of the Russian Federation has minted several commemorative coins dedicated to the Commonwealth of Independent States.
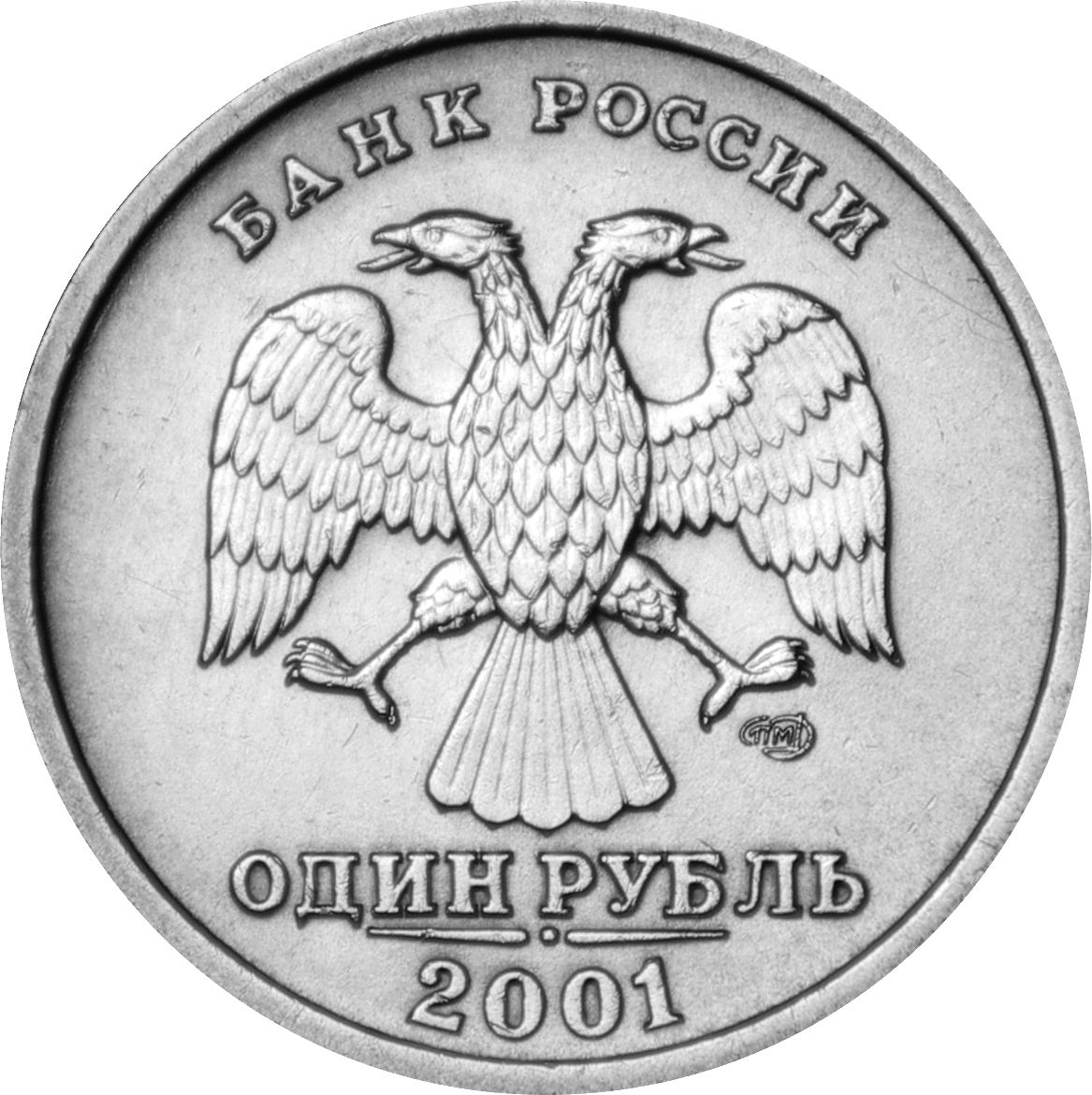
Obverse of the 1-ruble 2001 copper-nickel alloy coin

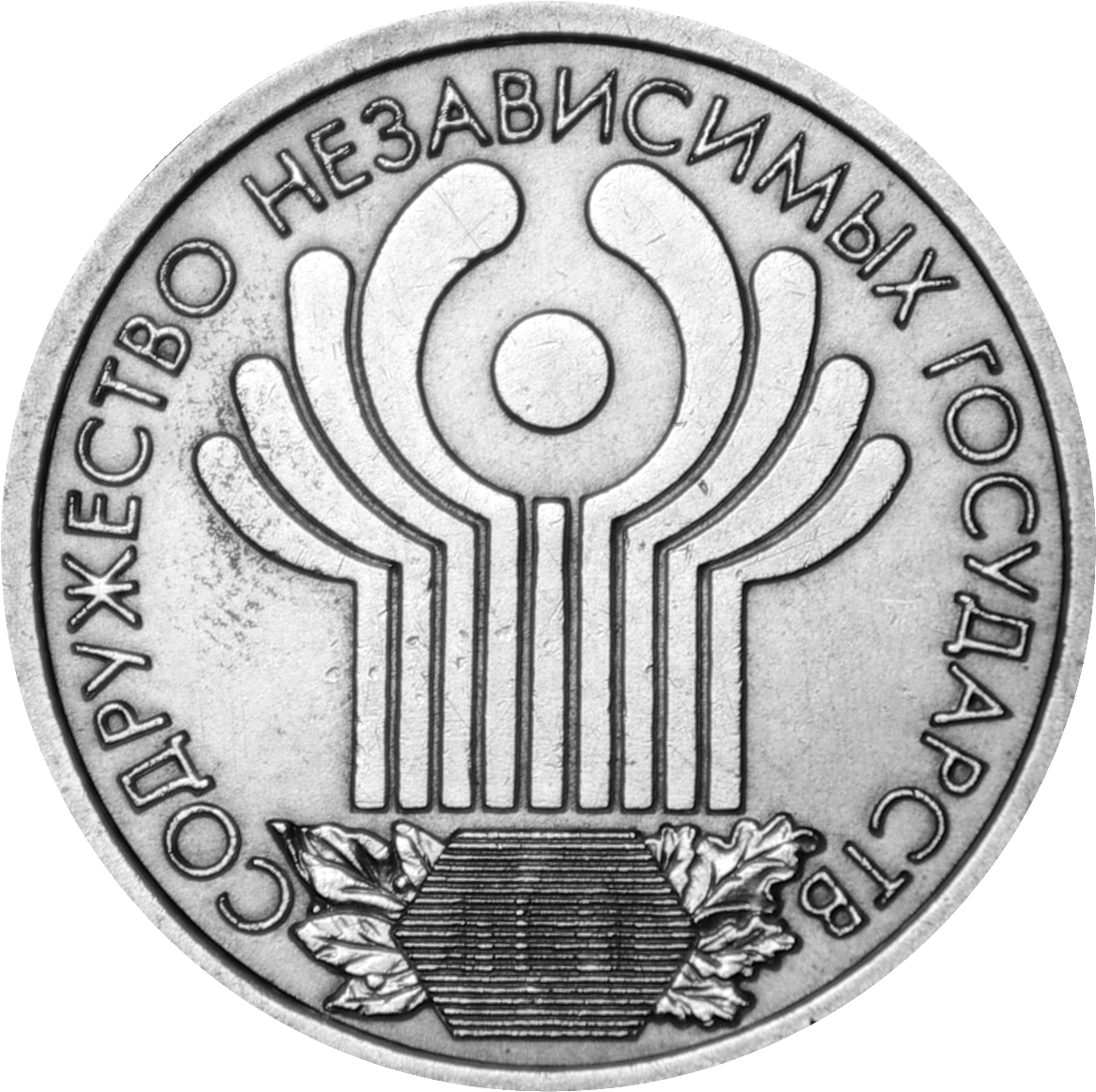
Reverse of a 1-ruble coin

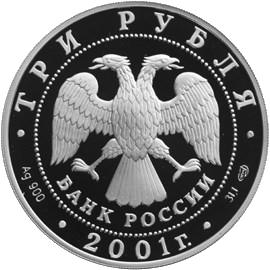
Obverse of the 3-ruble 2001 silver coin of 900

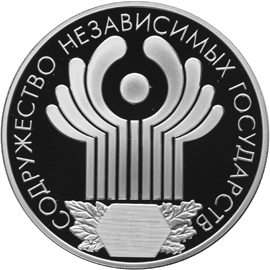
Reverse of a 3-ruble coin

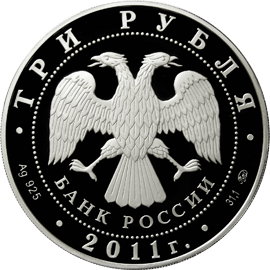
Obverse of the 3-ruble coin of 2011 made of 925 sterling silver

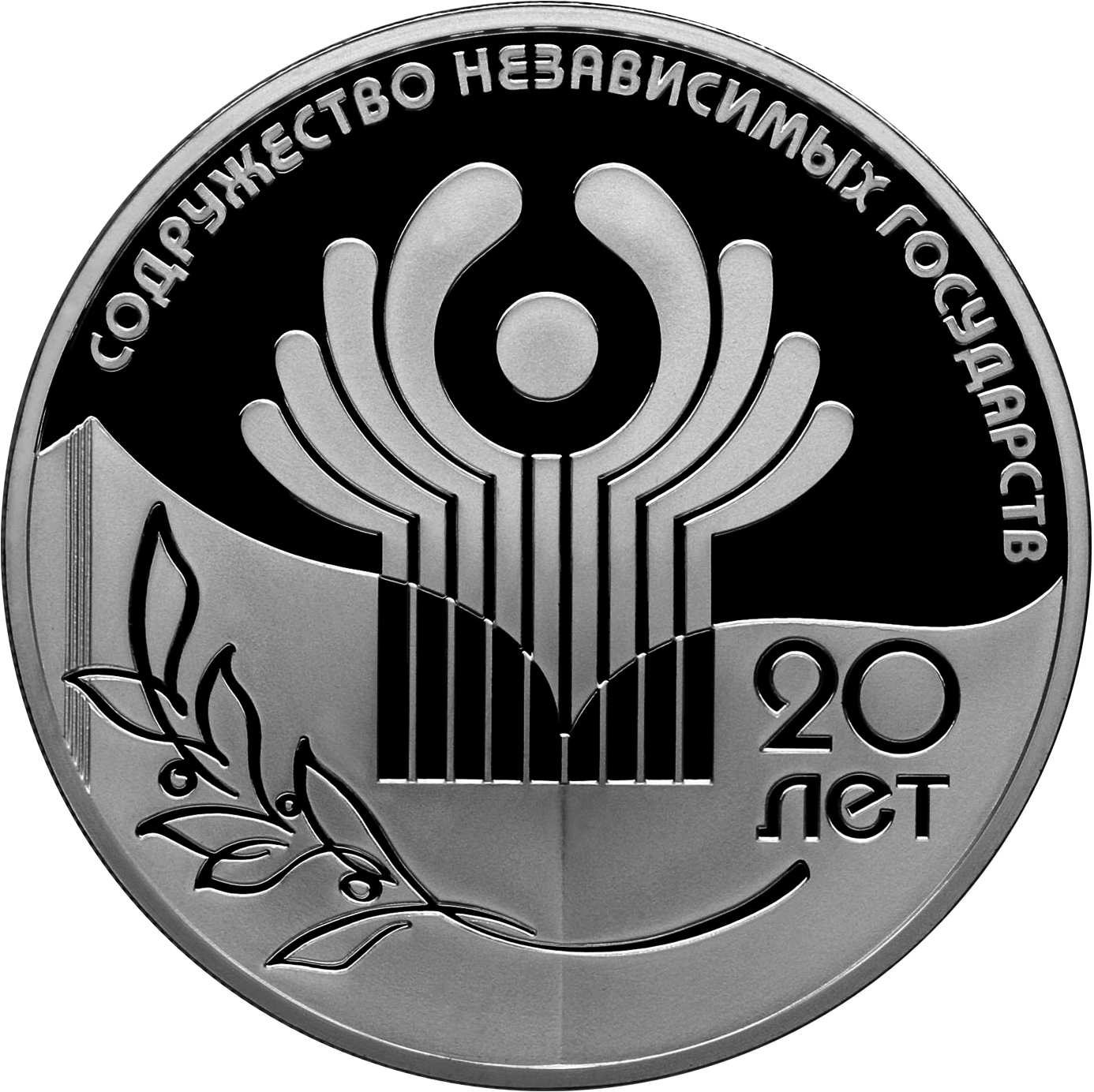
Reverse of a 3-ruble coin
- In 2006, the National Bank of the Republic of Belarus issued commemorative coins "Commonwealth of Independent States. 15 years" in denominations of 1 (copper-nickel) and 20 (silver, 925) white rubles.

== See also ==
- Bibliography of Vladimir Putin
- Bibliography of Russian history (1991–present)
- Collective Security Treaty Organization (CSTO)
- Eurasianism
- Russian world
- Comecon
- Community for Democracy and Rights of Nations
- Dissolution of the Soviet Union
- Eastern Bloc
- Eurasian Economic Union
- Lublin Triangle
- Post-Soviet states
- Unified Team
