= General Secretary of the Commonwealth of Independent States =

Head of the Commonwealth Secretariat

- Генеральный секретарь Содружества Независимых Государств (Russian)
- Flag of the CIS

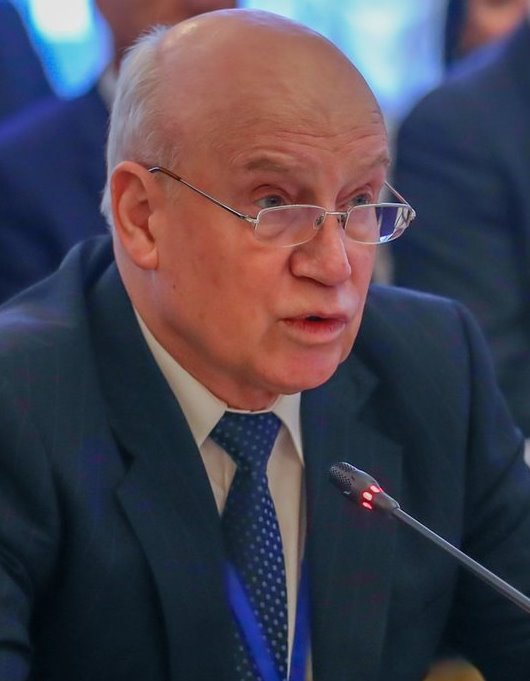
- Incumbent; Sergey Lebedev since 5 October 2007
- Executive Secretariat
- Style: His Excellency
- Member of: Council of Heads of State of the CIS
- Seat: 17 Kirov Street, Minsk, Belarus
- Term length: Three years
- Precursor: Leader of the Soviet Union; President of the Soviet Union
- Formation: 14 May 1994
- First holder: Ivan Korotchenya
- Deputy: First deputy general secretary

The General Secretary of the Commonwealth of Independent States (Russian: Генеральный секретарь Содружества Независимых Государств, romanized: General'nyy sekretar' Sodruzhestva Nezavisimykh Gosudarstv; formerly known as the Executive Secretary) is the head of the CIS Executive Committee, the central body which has served the CIS since its establishment in 1991. The headquarters of the secretary-general, as with the committee, is in Minsk, Belarus.

== History ==
The position was created in 1994, replacing the President of the Soviet Union.

In late 2022, it was announced that the position's formal title will be changed. By the decision of the Council of Heads of State on 1 January 2023, the formal title of Chairman of the Executive Committee – CIS Executive Secretary was changed to CIS General Secretary.

== Executive committee ==
The general secretary leads the executive committee (Russian: Исполнительном комитете), and all Secretariat staff are answerable to them. He is supported by four deputy general secretaries:

- Leonid Anfimov (First Deputy)
- Dauren Abaev
- Ilkhom Nematov
- Denis Trefilov

It is the single permanent executive, administrative and coordinating body of the CIS The CIS Executive Committee organizes its work in close cooperation with the Council of Permanent Plenipotentiary Representatives among other bodies of the CIS. On 2 April 1999, the Council of Heads of State decided to reorganize the CIS Executive Secretariat, the apparatus of the Interstate Economic Committee, and other departments into a single permanent executive body: the CIS Executive Committee Independent States, the legal successor of the CIS Executive Secretariat. The council on 21 June 2000, approved the Regulations on the executive committee.

== List of secretaries-general ==
No.	Portrait	Name (born–died)	Term of office			Country	Ref.
No.	Portrait	Name (born–died)	Took office	Left office	Time in office	Country	Ref.
1		Ivan Korotchenya (born 1948)	14 May 1993	29 April 1998	4 years, 350 days	Belarus	
2		Boris Berezovsky (1946–2013)	29 April 1998	4 March 1999	309 days	Russia	
(1)		Ivan Korotchenya (born 1948)	4 March 1999	2 April 1999	29 days	Belarus	
3		Yury Yarov (born 1942)	2 April 1999	14 July 2004	5 years, 103 days	Russia	
4		Vladimir Rushailo (born 1953)	14 July 2004	5 October 2007	3 years, 83 days	Russia	
5		Sergei Lebedev (born–1936)	5 October 2007	Incumbent	18 years, 337 days	Russia	

== See also ==
- Secretary General of the CSTO
- Commonwealth Secretary-General
