= Emblem of the Commonwealth of Independent States =

Multinational emblem

Emblem (Seal) of the Commonwealth of Independent States
- Armiger: Commonwealth of Independent States
- Adopted: 1996

The emblem of the Commonwealth of Independent States (Russian: Эмблема Содружества Независимых Государств) depicts a yellow sun on a dark blue field, with eight bending poles and one upright pole in the center holding the sun. The dark blue field is encased in a circular white outline, which is itself fringed with a thin blue outline.

== Description ==
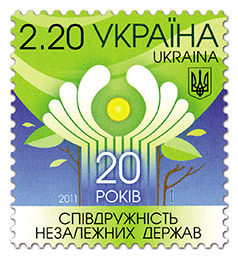
2011 stamp of Ukraine

The design (which reflects that of the flag of the Commonwealth) symbolizes the desire for equal partnership, unity, peace and stability.

== See also ==
- Flag of the Commonwealth of Independent States
- Branding national myths and symbols
