= Flag of the Commonwealth of Independent States =

Multinational flag

Commonwealth of Independent States
- Proportion: 1:2
- Adopted: 19 January 1996; 30 years ago

The flag of the Commonwealth of Independent States (Russian: Флаг Содружества Независимых Государств) (Note: Azerbaijani: Müstəqil Dövlətlər Birliyinin bayrağı Armenian: Անկախ Պետությունների Համագործակցության դրոշ (romanised: Ankakh Petut’yunneri Hamagortsakts’ut’yan drosh) Tajik: Парчами Иттиҳоди Давлатҳои Мустақил Kazakh: Тәуелсіз Мемлекеттер Достастығы Туы / Täuelsız Memleketter Dostastyğy Tuy Romanian: Steagul Comunității Statelor Independente Belarusian: Сцяг Садружнасці Незалежных Дзяржаў (romanised: Sciah Sadružnasci Niezaliežnych Dziaržaŭ) Kyrgyz: Көз карандысыз Мамлекеттер Шериктештигинин туусу (romanised: Köz qarandısız Mamleketter Şerikteştiginin tuusu) Uzbek: Mustaqil Davlatlar Hamdo'stligi bayrog'i) was adopted in 1996 and depicts a yellow sun on a dark blue field, with one straight and eight bending poles holding the sun. The design symbolizes the desire for equal partnership, unity, peace and stability.

The 8 bending poles represent the 8 states which signed the 1991 treaty forming the CIS.

== Former flag ==
Before the flag was adopted, a provisional flag just showing the text "C.I.S." on a white background was used, such as at sporting events where a Commonwealth team replaced the USSR after the Soviets had qualified but weren't able to attend before it was dissolved.

Former flag of the CIS

== See also ==
- Emblem of the Commonwealth of Independent States
- Flag of the Soviet Union
