= .tj =

Internet country code top-level domain for Tajikistan

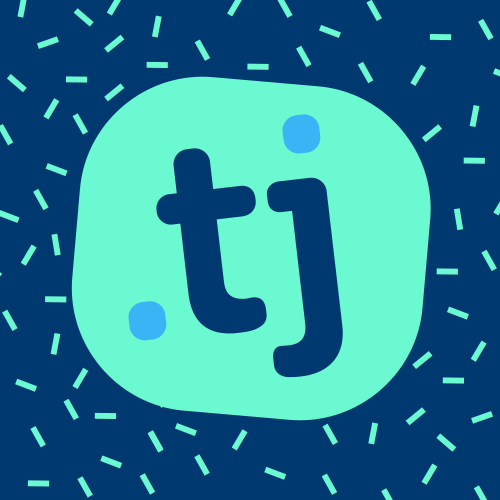
- Introduced: 11 December 1997
- TLD type: Country code top-level domain
- Status: Active
- Registry: Information Technology Center
- Sponsor: Information Technology Center
- Intended use: Entities connected with Tajikistan
- Actual use: Gets some use in Tajikistan
- Registration restrictions: None; however, residents of Tajikistan have priority in disputes
- Structure: Registrations are made directly at the second level, or at the third level beneath second-level names
- Documents: Policy
- Dispute policies: UDRP
- Registry website: nic.tj

.tj is the Internet country code top-level domain (ccTLD) for Tajikistan. Registrations are processed via accredited registrars.

== Second-level domains ==
The following second-level domains are available for third-level domain name registration:

- biz.tj, intended for commercial entities
- co.tj, intended for commercial entities
- com.tj, intended for commercial entities
- edu.tj, reserved for educational institutions
- go.tj, reserved for websites of the Government of Tajikistan and government departments/institutions
- gov.tj, reserved for websites of the Government of Tajikistan and government departments/institutions
- info.tj, intended for informational websites
- mil.tj, reserved for the Armed Forces of the Republic of Tajikistan
- name.tj, intended for individuals and Tajik nationals
- net.tj, intended for network providers/operators and organizations implementing projects related to the development of the Internet
- nic.tj, reserved for the Network Information Center and support for the ccTLD
- org.tj, intended for nonprofit organizations
- web.tj, general public domain
