= Ivan Korotchenya =

Belarusian politician

- Іван Каратчэня (Belarusian); Иван Коротченя (Russian)

CIS Executive Secretary
- In office 4 March 1999 – 2 April 1999
- Preceded by: Boris Berezovsky
- Succeeded by: Yury Yarov

CIS Executive Secretary
- In office 14 May 1993 – 29 April 1998
- Succeeded by: Boris Berezovsky

Member of the House of Representatives
- In office 1996–2000

Personal details
- Born: 13 October 1948 (age 78) Tal, Minsk Region, Byelorussian SSR, Soviet Union

Ivan Mikhailovich Korotchenya (Belarusian: Іван Міхайлавіч Каратчэня; Russian: Иван Михайлович Коротченя; born 13 August 1948) is a Belarusian politician who had served as the General Secretary of the Commonwealth of Independent States from 1993 to 1998, and again in 1999.

He is also a scientist-economist, Doctor of Economics, and Professor. He is an academician of the International Academy of Organizational and Management since 1994, the International Academy of Information, Information Processes and Technology since 1995, and the International Academy of Sciences Higher School since 1997.

== Biography ==
Ivan Korotchenya was born in Tal, Minsk Region on 13 August 1948.

He graduated from the Agricultural College in 1967.

From 1969 to 1975, he worked as the chief agronomist, deputy chairman of the collective farm named after the Belarusian military district of the Lubansky district.

From 1975 to 1976, after his graduation from the Faculty of Agriculture of the Belarusian Agricultural Academy that year, he was the Head of the Lubansky Rhoderstarti.

In 1986, he worked as the head of the department of agriculture, and was the first deputy chairman of the Uzda district executive committee. From 1986 to 1990, he was the first secretary of the Vileika City Committee of the Communist Party.

He was a member of the Supreme Council of Belarus from 1990 to 1992, and was a member of the Presidium, chairman of the commission on publicity, media and human rights.

In January 1992, by a decision of the Council of the Heads of State of the CIS, Korothenya was appointed coordinator of the working group of the Council of Heads of State and the Council of Heads of Government of the CIS.

On 15 March 1992, Korotchenya was seen at the gathering of thieves' authorities in the Minsk restaurant, according to the Ministry of Internal Affairs of Belarus and the Kommersant newspaper, the restaurant on this day was rented by representatives of the criminal world completely and the random person could not get to the event of “thieves in law” in any way.

On 14 May 1993, Korotchenya became the CIS General Sectary. He did a lot to create the structures of the working bodies of the new political education at that time, at the Commonwealth of Independent States.

He is a candidate of Economic Sciences as of 1994, with the topic of the dissertation: "Formation and conditions for the development of the integration economic union of the CIS member states".

In 1996, he was reelected as a member of the Supreme Council. That same year, he was transferred House of Representatives (Belarus), and was the Doctor of Economics in 1996, with the topic of dissertation: "Strategy and prospects for the formation of the CIS Economic Union".

On 29 April 1998, he had been the First Deputy Executive Secretary of the CIS, until 4 March 1999, he we became the CIS General Secretary, on the second term. His Russian counterpart, Yury Yarov, was his successor on 2 April.

After leaving the Belarusian parliament in 2000, he went on teaching in Moscow, and is the author of more than 40 scientific papers.

In January 2007, Korothenya, having already left a big policy, unexpectedly reminded himself of an exclusive interview with Interfax, in which he criticized Russian President Vladimir Putin's position on the problems of fuel and energy partnerships with Belarus, assigned the Kremlin responsibility for the trade and economic conflict between Russia and Belarusia, and characterized the course of the official authority of Russia as erroneous and destructive. Some sources claim to Ivan Karatchenya's likely contacts with the world of crime.

== Family ==
He is married, and has two children.
